= List of Czech films of the 1940s =

A List of Czech films of the 1940s.

== Films by year ==
=== 1940 ===
Title	Director	Cast	Genre	Notes
Arthur and Leontine	Miroslav Josef Krňanský	Jiří Dohnal, Lída Baarová	Comedy	
Babička (Grandmother)	František Čáp	Terezie Brzková, Karel Třešňák, Světla Svozilová, Nataša Tánská, Jan Krchňavý, Gustav Nezval	romantic drama	production: Slaviafilm
Baron Prášil	Martin Frič	Vlasta Burian, Oldřich Nový, Zorka Janů, Meda Valentová, Čeňek Šlégl	comedy	production: Slaviafilm
Dívka v modrém	Otakar Vávra	Oldřich Nový, Lída Baarová, Nataša Gollová	comedy	production: Lucernafilm
Dva týdny štěstí	Vladimír Slavínský	Adina Mandlová, Raoul Schránil, Rudolf Deyl, Jaroslav Marvan	comedy	production: Slaviafilm
Katakomby (The Catacombs)	Martin Frič	29. movie of Vlasta Burian, Jaroslav Marvan, Antonín Novotný, Adina Mandlová, Čeněk Šlégl, Nataša Gollová, Raoul Schránil, Theodor Pištěk	comedy	production: UFA
Konečně sami (Finally Alone)	Miroslav Cikán	Nataša Gollová, Miroslav Homola, Růžena Nasková, Jaroslav Marvan, Jindřich Plachta	comedy	production: Nationalfilm
Ladies in Waiting	Vladimír Borský	Zorka Janů, Anna Letenská	Romantic comedy	
Maskovaná milenka (The Masked Lover)	Otakar Vávra	Lída Baarová, Gustav Nezval, Ladislav Pešek, Jiří Steimar, Jiřina Šejbalová	romantic drama	production: Elektafilm
Muzikantská Liduška	Martin Frič	Jiřina Štěpničková, Gustav Nezval, Gustav Hilmar, Jaroslav Marvan, Vilém Pfeiffer, Eman Fiala, Ella Nollová	romantic drama	production: UFA
Okénko do nebe	Zdeněk Gina Hašler	Ladislav Pešek, Jiří Dohnal, Nataša Gollová	comedy	production: Stella
Pacientka Dr. Hegla	Otakar Vávra	Adina Mandlová, Otomar Korbelář, Světla Svozilová, Zorka Janů	drama	production: Slaviafilm
Pelikán má alibi	Miroslav Cikán			
Pohádka máje	Otakar Vávra	Svatopluk Beneš, Nataša Gollová, Theodor Pištěk	romantic drama	production: Elektafilm
Přítelkyně pana ministra	Vladimír Slavínský	Adina Mandlová, Oldřich Nový, Franta Paul, Jaroslav Marvan	comedy	production: Bromfilm
Pro kamaráda (For a Friend)	Miroslav Cikán			
Stestí pro dva (Happiness for Two)	Miroslav Cikán			

=== 1941 ===
Title	Director	Cast	Genre	Notes
The Blue Star Hotel	Martin Frič	Nataša Gollová, Oldřich Nový, Adina Mandlová, Theodor Pištěk	Comedy	production: Lucernafilm
From the Czech Mills	Miroslav Cikán	Theodor Pištěk, Jindřich Plachta	Comedy	
In the Still of the Night	Zdeněk Gina Hašler	Lída Baarová, Karel Höger	Drama	
Přednosta stanice	Jan Sviták	31. movie of Vlasta Burian, Zita Kabátová, Jaroslav Marvan, Čeněk Šlégl	comedy	production: Bromfilm
Provdám svou ženu	Miroslav Cikán	32. movie of Vlasta Burian, Jaroslav Marvan, Světla Svozilová, Věra Ferbasová, Čeněk Šlégl, Miloš Nedbal, Raoul Schránil, Zita Kabátová	comedy	production: Slaviafilm
Rukavička	Jan A. Holman	Nataša Gollová, Otomar Korbelář, Vlasta Fabiánová	comedy	
Noční motýl (Nocturnal Butterfly)	František Čáp	Hana Vítová, Adina Mandlová, Svatopluk Beneš, Gustav Nezval, Rudolf Hrušínský	drama	production: Lucernafilm
Těžký život dobrodruha	Martin Frič	Otomar Korbelář, Ladislav Pešek, Adina Mandlová, Jaroslav Marvan	comedy	production: Bromfilm The plot of this film is quite same as The Magnificent One with Jean-Paul Belmondo 32 years later
Roztomilý člověk	Martin Frič	Oldřich Nový, Nataša Gollová	comedy	production: Nationalfilm
Jan Cimbura	Otakar Vávra	Jiřina Štěpničková, Gustav Nezval, Vilém Pfeiffer, Jaroslav Průcha, Vladimír Šmeral	drama	production: Lucernafilm

=== 1942 ===
Title	Director	Cast	Genre	Notes
Gabriela	Miroslav Josef Krňanský	Marie Glázrová, Karel Höger	Drama	
The Great Dam	Jan Alfréd Holman	František Vnouček, Adina Mandlová	Drama	
Karel and I	Miroslav Cikán			
Valentin the Good	Martin Frič	Oldřich Nový, Hana Vítová	Comedy	
Ryba na suchu	Vladimír Slavínský	33. movie of Vlasta Burian, Zita Kabátová, Věra Ferbasová, Raoul Schránil	comedy	production: Lucernafilm
Velká přehrada	Jan A. Holman	Nataša Gollová, Vítězslav Vejražka, Adina Mandlová	criminal drama	
Zlaté dno	Vladimír Slavínský	34. movie of Vlasta Burian, Marie Štrosová, Vítězslav Vejražka, Jaroslav Marvan, Václav Trégl	comedy	production: Lucernafilm
Okouzlená	Otakar Vávra	Václav Vydra, Leopolda Dostálová, Nataša Gollová, Adina Mandlová	drama	production: Lucernafilm

=== 1943 ===
Title	Director	Cast	Genre	Notes
Čtrnáctý u stolu				
The Dancer	František Čáp	Marie Glázrová, Jiřina Štěpničková, Růžena Nasková	Drama	
Bláhový sen	Jan A. Holman	Nataša Gollová, Jaroslav Marvan, Zdeňka Baldová, Vítězslav Vejražka, Adina Mandlová	drama	production: Nationalfilm

=== 1944 ===
Title	Director	Cast	Genre	Notes
Das schwarze Schaf	Miroslav Cikán			
Děvčica z Beskyd	František Čáp	Jaroslav Vojta, Jiřina Štěpničková, Terezie Brzková, Otomar Korbelář, František Kreuzmann, Gustav Nezval	romantic drama	production: Nationalfilm
Glück unterwegs	Miroslav Cikán			
Neviděli jste Bobíka?				
Paklíc	Miroslav Cikán			
Počestné paní pardubické	Martin Frič	František Smolík, Jiřina Štěpničková, Terezie Brzková, Eman Fiala, Jindřich Plachta, Gustav Nezval	romantic drama	production: Nationalfilm
U peti veverek	Miroslav Cikán			
Veselá bída	Miroslav Cikán			

=== 1945 ===
Title	Director	Cast	Genre	Notes
Řeka čaruje				
Saturday	Václav Wasserman	Hana Vítová, Adina Mandlová	Drama	

=== 1946 ===
Title	Director	Cast	Genre	Notes
The Adventurous Bachelor	Otakar Vávra	Zdeněk Štěpánek, Vlasta Matulová, Otomar Korbelář	Comedy	Entered into the 1946 Cannes Film Festival
The Avalanche	Miroslav Cikán	Otomar Korbelář, Marie Glázrová, Helena Bušová	Drama	
A Big Case	Václav Kubásek, Josef Mach	Jaroslav Průcha, Vítězslav Boček, Helena Busová	War comedy	
The Heroes Are Silent	Miroslav Cikán	Ladislav Boháč, Zdeněk Dítě, Jarmila Smejkalová	War drama	
Just Getting Started	Vladimír Slavínský	Jaroslav Marvan, Jindrich Plachta, Meda Valentová	Comedy	
Men Without Wings	František Čáp	Gustav Nezval, Jiřina Petrovická, Ladislav H. Struna, Eduard Linkers, Jaroslav Seník, Marie Nademlejnská	Drama	Won the Palme d'Or at the 1946 Cannes Film Festival
Thunder in the Hills	Václav Kubásek, Josef Mach	Jaroslav Průcha, Marie Vásová, Miroslav Homola	War	

=== 1947 ===
Title	Director	Cast	Genre	Notes
Alena	Miroslav Cikán			
Don't You Know of an Unoccupied Flat?	Bořivoj Zeman	Josef Pehr, Božena Obrová, Eduard Dubský	Comedy	
The Last of the Mohicans	Vladimír Slavínský	Jaroslav Marvan, Meda Valentová, Sona Cervená	Comedy	
Nobody Knows Anything	Josef Mach	Jaroslav Marvan, František Filipovský, Jana Dítětová	War comedy	
Parohy		Oldřich Nový	comedy	
Siréna				

=== 1948 ===
Title	Director	Cast	Genre	Notes
Hostinec U kamenného stolu				
Matous the Cobbler	Miroslav Cikán			
Old Ironside	Václav Kubásek	Jaroslav Marvan, Otomar Krejča, Lubomír Lipský	Comedy drama	
White Darkness	František Čáp	Július Pántik, Mária Prechovská, Boris Andreyev	War drama	

=== 1949 ===
Title	Director	Cast	Genre	Notes
A Dead Man Among the Living	Bořivoj Zeman	Karel Höger, Eduard Dubský	Thriller	
Distant Journey	Alfréd Radok	Blanka Waleská, Otomar Krejča	War drama	
The Emperor's Nightingale	Jiří Trnka	animated, English language - Boris Karloff - Narrator		
Případ Z-8	Miroslav Cikán			
Pytlákova schovanka	Martin Frič	Oldřich Nový, Hana Vítová, Theodor Pištěk	parody	
