= U nás v Kocourkově =

1934 Czechoslovak drama film

- Directed by: Miroslav Cikán
- Written by: Miroslav Cikán, Jaroslav Mottl and Karel Poláček
- Screenplay by: Václav Wasserman
- Starring: Jan Werich, Jindřich Plachta, and Václav Trégl
- Cinematography: Jaroslav Blažek
- Edited by: Antonín Zelenka
- Music by: Jaroslav Ježek, Julius Kalas
- Production company: Lloydfilm
- Release date: 1934
- Running time: 87 minutes
- Country: Czechoslovakia

U nás v Kocourkově (Note: Kocourkov is a fictional Czech town of fools.) is a 1934 Czechoslovak comedy film, directed by Miroslav Cikán. It stars Jan Werich, Jindřich Plachta, and Václav Trégl. It was one of several films the director made with Werich, and features him as a convict. The idea for the film was suggested by Karel Poláček, with the mistaken identity comic situation borrowed from Gogol's The Government Inspector.

== Plot sketch ==
Kaplan, a convict, manages to escape from the prison. When arriving to Kocourkov, he is mistaken for a returning "young Jalovec", who left the town long time ago and became famous. The citizens elect him for a mayor...

== Cast ==
- Jan Werich as Ferdinand Kaplan - Convict no. 1313
- Jindřich Plachta as Jalovec - poacher
- Václav Trégl as Ludvík Espandr - Barber
- Zdeňka Baldová as Nykysová - widow
- Ladislav Pešek as Dr. Nykys
- Jaroslav Vojta as Mayor Adam
- Hermína Vojtová as the Mayor's wife
- Marie Tauberová as Blazenka
- Svetla Svozilová as Lily - circus performer
- Jaroslav Marvan as Director of prison
- Stanislav Neumann as Prisoner in solitary confinement
- Jaroslav Průcha as Detective
- Jan Richter as Detective
