= Plachta =

Plachta (feminine: Plachtová) is a Czech surname. Notable people with the surname include:

- Jindřich Plachta (1899–1951), Czech actor
- Matthias Plachta (born 1991), German ice hockey player
