= Svět kde se žebrá =

- Directed by: Miroslav Cikán
- Starring: Hugo Haas, Marie Glázrová, and Ladislav Boháč.
- Production company: Moldavia Film
- Release date: 1938
- Running time: 78 minutes
- Country: Czechoslovakia

Svět kde se žebrá is a 1938 Czechoslovak comedy film, directed by Miroslav Cikán. It stars Hugo Haas, Marie Glázrová, and Ladislav Boháč.
