= Das schwarze Schaf =

Das schwarze Schaf may refer to:

- The Black Sheep (1960 film), a German krimi mystery film
- Das schwarze Schaf (1944 film), a German/Czechoslovak film
