= Turbina (disambiguation) =

Turbina is a 1941 Czech drama film. The name means "turbine" in several Slavic languages as well as in Albanian. It may also refer to:

== Association football ==
- FK Turbina Jablanica, a football club in Bosnia and Herzegovina
- FC Turbina Naberezhnye Chelny, Russian football club
- FK Turbina Vreoci, a Serbian football club
- KF Turbina Cërrik, Albanian football club

== Other ==
- Turbina, Calamba, part of Calamba City in the Philippines
- Fiat Turbina, a 1954 concept car
- Turbina corymbosa, a species of morning glory plant native to Latin America
- Nika Turbina (1974–2002), Ukrainian poet

== See also ==
- Turbinia, British steam-turbine powered ship
