= Na Svatém Kopečku =

- Directed by: Miroslav Cikán
- Screenplay by: Václav Wasserman, Karel Melísek, Jaroslav Mottl
- Based on: The operetta Na Svatém Kopečku by Jiří Balda and Rudolf Nížkovský
- Starring: Jaroslav Vojta, Marie Grossová, and Jiřina Steimarová
- Cinematography: Jaroslav Blažek
- Music by: Antonín Vlastislav Vipler
- Production company: Lepka
- Release date: 1934
- Running time: 87 minutes
- Country: Czechoslovakia

Na Svatém Kopečku is a 1934 Czechoslovak musical comedy film, directed by Miroslav Cikán. It stars Jaroslav Vojta, Marie Grossová, and Jiřina Steimarová.

== Cast ==
- Jaroslav Vojta as Holeček, farmer
- Marie Grossová as Mája Malínská
- Jiřina Steimarová as Heda
- Valentin Šindler as Matej Krópal from Brochovany
- Rudolf Lampa
- Světla Svozilová as Běta
- Ladislav Pešek
- Jindřich Plachta as Jakub
- Zdeňka Baldová as Králová
- Václav Trégl as Portýr
- Jaroslav Bráška
- Josef Kotalík
- Bohumil Mottl
