= V pokušení =

- Directed by: Miroslav Cikán
- Starring: Jiří Dohnal, Ladislav Boháč, Marie Glázrová
- Release date: 1939
- Running time: 77 minute
- Country: Czechoslovakia

V pokušení is a 1939 Czechoslovak romance film, directed by Miroslav Cikán. It stars Jiří Dohnal, Ladislav Boháč and Marie Glázrová.

== Cast ==
- Jirí Dohnal as Ing. Jan Svoboda
- Ladislav Bohác as Pavel, brother of Jan
- Marie Glázrová as Eva Skálová
- Vlasta Hrubá as Inka
- Jaroslav Marvan as Kolár, továrník
- Natasa Gollová as Kolár's daughter
- Vilém Pfeiffer as KArel Kubát
- Helena Busová as Marta
