= The House in the Suburbs =

1933 film by Miroslav Cikán

- Directed by: Miroslav Cikán
- Screenplay by: Miroslav Cikán, Hugo Haas
- Based on: A book by Karel Poláček
- Produced by: Josef Hasler
- Starring: Antonie Nedošinská, Hugo Haas, and Hana Vítová
- Cinematography: Ferdinand Pečenka, Jan Stallich and Václav Vích
- Edited by: Antonín Zelenka
- Music by: Julius Kalas
- Production company: Lepka
- Release date: 20 October 1933
- Running time: 89 minutes
- Country: Czechoslovakia
- Language: Czech

Dum na predmesti (The House in the Suburbs) is a 1933 Czechoslovak comedy film, directed by Miroslav Cikán. It stars Antonie Nedošinská, Hugo Haas, and Hana Vítová. It is based on a book by Karel Poláček.

== Plot ==
The film is about the bitter struggles of the tenants of a suburban house who face increased rent.

== Cast ==
- Antonie Nedošinská as Anna Faktorová the landlady
- Hugo Haas as Zajícek
- Hana Vítová as Vera the pianist
- Jindřich Plachta as Jan Mejstrík, shopkeeper
- Jaroslav Vojta as Václav Supita, shoemaker
