= Finally Alone =

- Directed by: Miroslav Cikán
- Starring: Růžena Nasková, Nataša Gollová, Miroslav Homola.
- Production company: Nationalfilm
- Release date: 1940
- Countries: Bohemia and Moravia

Finally Alone (Konečně sami) is a 1940 comedy film from German-occupied Czechoslovakia, directed by Miroslav Cikán. It stars Růžena Nasková, Nataša Gollová, Miroslav Homola.

== Cast ==
- Růžena Nasková as Marta Hábová
- Nataša Gollová as Marta Dvořáková
- Miroslav Homola as Dr. Petr Dvořák
- Jaroslav Marvan as lawyer Karel Lehovec
- Jindřich Plachta as Vinca Mácek
- Stanislav Neumann as Ferda Kalabiš
- Theodor Pištěk as Constable
- Marie Norrová as Maid
