= Gabriela Preissová =

Czech writer and playwright

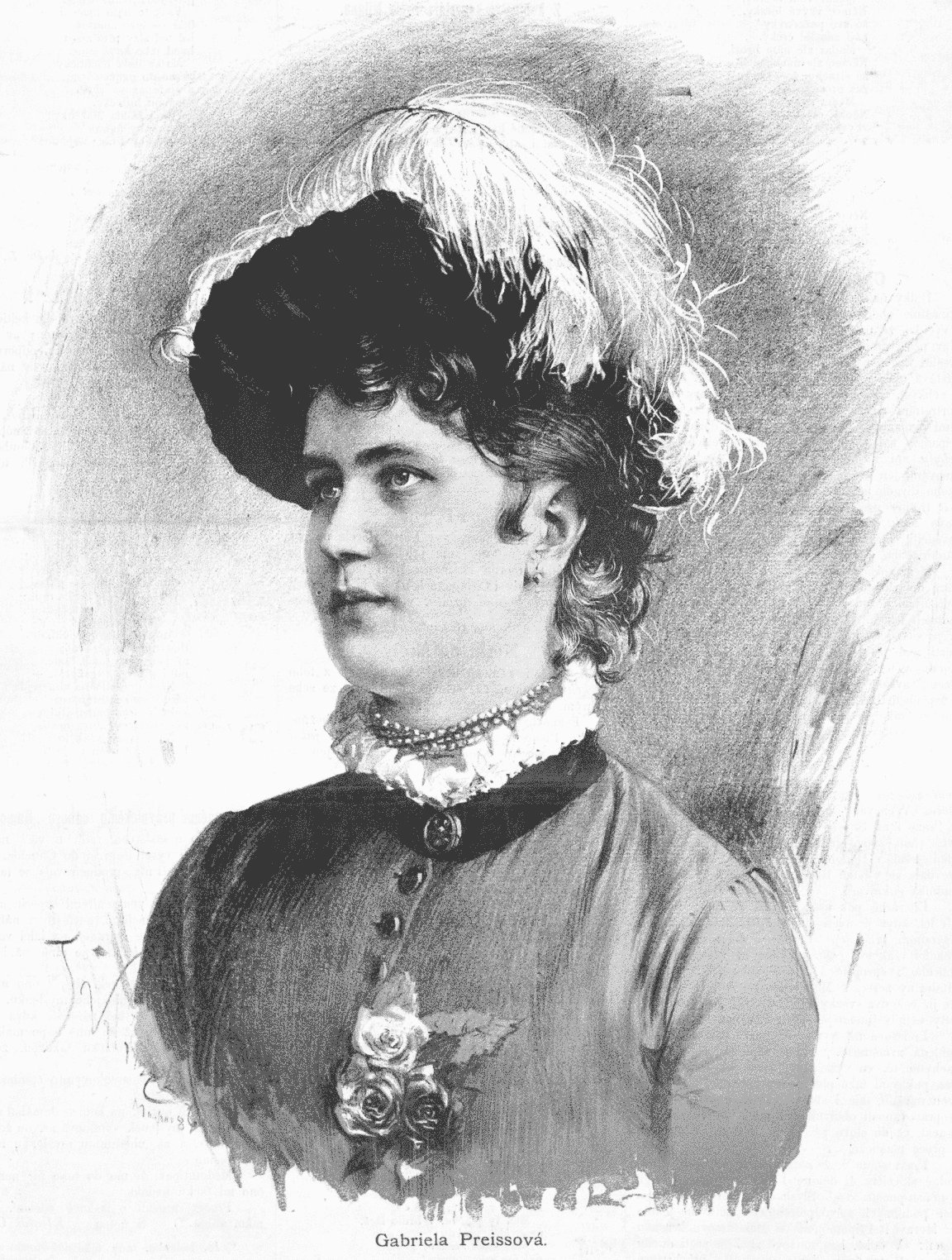
Gabriela Preissová (Jan Vilímek 1886)

Gabriela Preissová, née Gabriela Sekerová, sometimes used pen name Matylda Dumontová (23 March 1862 in Kutná Hora – 27 March 1946 in Prague), was a Czech writer and playwright. Her play Její pastorkyňa was the basis for the opera Jenůfa by Leoš Janáček, as well as a film by Miroslav Cikán. His earlier opera The Beginning of a Romance was also based on one of her stories.

Preissová mostly wrote stories full of optimism and the joy of life idealising village life. Her stories first appeared in the early 1890s. The more significant appeared in a three-volume collection. Her books, written in the 1920s, were about the tragic rural life of the Carinthian Slavs, usually with a strong woman as a heroine. These dramas didn't achieve the artistic spontaneity of her early work. Themes of her stories were mostly the affairs of young lovers and the obstacles to their consummation. Some tales were set to music, such as Eva by Josef Bohuslav Foerster and Jenůfa, an opera by Janáček.

"Jenufa" was published in a 1999 collection of plays: Eastern Promise: Seven Plays from Central and Eastern Europe.
