= From the Czech Mills =

From the Czech Mills may refer to:

- From the Czech Mills (1925 film), directed by Svatopluk Innemann
- From the Czech Mills (1941 film), directed by Miroslav Cikán
