= A Woman as Good as Her Word =

- Directed by: Jaroslav Mach
- Written by: Jiří Karásek; Jaroslav Mach; Oldřich Nový; Alice Valentová
- Starring: Jiřina Steimarová
- Cinematography: Václav Hunka
- Edited by: Jiřina Lukešová
- Music by: Julius Kalas
- Release date: 29 May 1953
- Running time: 88 minutes
- Country: Czechoslovakia
- Language: Czech

A Woman as Good as Her Word (Czech: Slovo dělá ženu) is a 1953 Czechoslovak comedy film directed by Jaroslav Mach and starring Jiřina Steimarová. The film was heavily influenced by Socialist realism, which was promoted by the Communist Party in the 1950s.

== Cast ==
- Jiřina Steimarová as Jarmila
- Rudolf Deyl as Jonás
- Miloš Forman as Young Worker
- Nelly Gaierová as Jakubcová
- Antonín Holzinger as Kalous
- Alena Kreuzmannová as Bozenka
- Vladimír Leraus as Reditel
- Oldřich Nový as Ludvík Zach
- František Paul as Jakubec
- Jaromír Spal as Jirka Zach
- Tatána Vavrincová as inzenýrka Marie Vanková

== Bibliography ==
- Alfred Krautz. International Directory of Cinematographers Set and Costume Designers in Film: Czechoslovakia. Saur, 1991.
