= Eighteen Years Old =

Eighteen Years Old (Osmnáctiletá)
- Directed by: Miroslav Cikán
- Starring: Hana Vítová, Bolek Prchal, and Ladislav Boháč.
- Production company: Nationalfilm
- Release date: 1939
- Country: Czechoslovakia

Eighteen Years Old (Osmnáctiletá) is a 1939 Czechoslovak drama film, directed by Miroslav Cikán. It stars Hana Vítová, Bolek Prchal, and Ladislav Boháč.
