= For a Friend (film) =

- Directed by: Miroslav Cikán
- Starring: Theodor Pistek, Ladislav Boháč, Jaroslav Vojta.
- Production company: Nationalfilm
- Release date: 1940
- Country: Czechoslovakia

For a Friend (Pro kamaráda) is a 1940 Czechoslovak drama film, directed by Miroslav Cikán. It stars Theodor Pistek, Ladislav Boháč, and Jaroslav Vojta.

== Cast ==
- Hana Vítová as Marie Topinková
- Jan Pivec as Pesek, Václav
- Ladislav Bohác as Jan Dlabal
- Jaroslav Vojta as Antonín Topinka
- Eman Fiala as Dusek
