= Filosofská historie =

1937 film

- Directed by: Otakar Vávra
- Written by: Alois Jirásek; Otakar Vávra
- Starring: Ladislav Boháč
- Release date: 1937
- Running time: 88 minutes
- Country: Czechoslovakia
- Language: Czech

Filosofská historie is a 1937 Czechoslovak drama film directed by Otakar Vávra.

== Cast ==
- Ladislav Boháč as Vavrena
- Karla Olicová as Lenka
- Jan Pivec as Frybort
- Elena Hálková as Marinka
- Vladimír Hlavatý as Spina
- Stanislav Neumann as Zelenka
- Helena Friedlová as Miss Elis, landlady
- Ela Poznerová as Lotty Roubínková (as Ella Poznerová)
- Zdenka Grafová as Therese Roubinkova
- Jindřich Plachta as Mayor Roubinek
