= The Princess with the Golden Star =

1959 film

- Directed by: Martin Frič
- Written by: Martin Frič; K. M. Walló
- Based on: Princezna se zlatou hvězdou na čele by Božena Němcová
- Starring: Marie Kyselková; Stanislav Neumann; František Smolík
- Cinematography: Jan Roth
- Edited by: Jan Kohout
- Music by: Bohuslav Sedláček
- Distributed by: Ústřední půjčovna filmů
- Release date: 18 December 1959
- Running time: 78 minutes
- Country: Czechoslovakia
- Language: Czech

The Princess with the Golden Star (Czech: Princezna se zlatou hvězdou) is a 1959 Czech fairy tale fantasy film written and directed by Martin Frič.

== Plot ==
A beautiful princess Lada was born with a golden star on her forehead. Her father the king Hostivít wants her to marry an evil and wealthy king Kazisvět VI, but Lada refuses. The princess dresses up in a fur coat made of mouse fur and runs away.

== Cast ==
- Marie Kyselková as Princess Lada
- František Smolík as King Hostivít
- Martin Růžek as King Kazisvět VI
- Stanislav Neumann as Chef
- Theodor Pištěk as Counsellor
- Josef Vinklář as Cook Janek
- Josef Zíma as Prince Radovan
- Jarmila Kurandová as Nanny
