= Happiness for Two =

- Directed by: Miroslav Cikán
- Starring: Jarmila Ksírová, Jindra Hermanová, Stanislav Neumann.
- Production company: Lucernafilm
- Release date: 1940
- Running time: 79 minute
- Country: Czechoslovakia

Happiness for Two (Stestí pro dva) is a 1940 Czechoslovak musical film, directed by Miroslav Cikán. It stars Jarmila Ksírová, Jindra Hermanová, Stanislav Neumann.
