= The Last Man (1934 film) =

1934 film

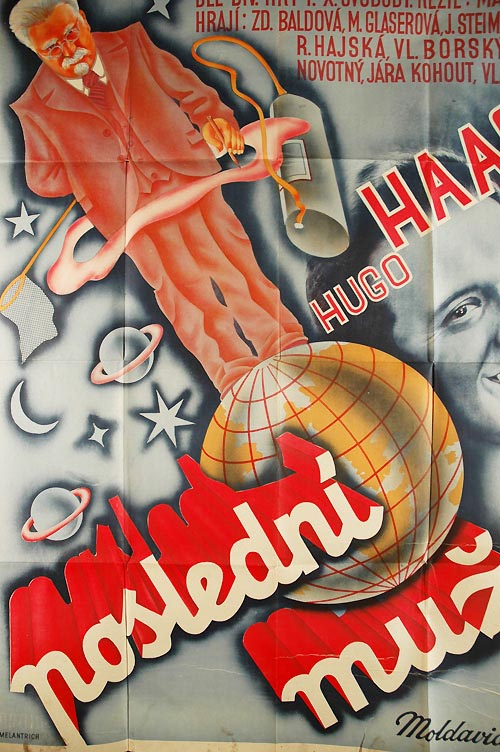
- Directed by: Martin Frič
- Written by: Václav Wasserman
- Based on: The Last Man by F.X. Svoboda
- Starring: Hugo Haas; Zdeňka Baldová; Marie Glázrová
- Cinematography: Jaroslav Blazek
- Edited by: Jan Kohout
- Music by: Karel Hasler
- Production company: Moldavia Film
- Release date: 1934
- Running time: 87 minutes
- Country: Czechoslovakia
- Language: Czech

The Last Man (Czech: Poslední muž) is a 1934 Czechoslovak comedy film directed by Martin Frič and starring Hugo Haas, Zdeňka Baldová and Marie Glázrová. It was shot at the Barrandov Studios in Prague. It was based on a play of the same title by F.X. Svoboda and was later remade as the 1947 film The Last of the Mohicans.

== Synopsis ==
Professor Alois Kohout dominates his family, oblivious to the feelings of his wife, son and daughter. He ultimately meets his match in the young man who has fallen in love with his daughter.

== Cast ==
- Hugo Haas as Professor Alois Kohout
- Zdeňka Baldová as Mrs. Kohoutová
- Marie Glázrová as Zdenka, daughter
- Antonín Novotný as Jaroslav, son
- Vladimír Borský as Dr. Jirí Becvár
- Jiřina Steimarová as Tonca Vacková
- Darja Hajská as Baruska, cooky
- Jára Kohout as Frantík
- Václav Trégl as Rejsek, janitor
- Bohdan Lachman as Director the school
- Milada Gampeová as Liduska Pivodová
- Josef Kotalík as Station master
- Emanuel Hríbal as Sadar
- Josef Mach as Student
- Alois Dvorský as Teacher

== Bibliography ==
- Goble, Alan. The Complete Index to Literary Sources in Film. Walter de Gruyter, 1999.
- Liehm, Antonín J. Closely Watched Films: The Czechoslovak Experience. International Arts and Sciences Press, 1974.
- Wohl, Eugen & Păcurar, Elena. Language of the Revolution: The Discourse of Anti-Communist Movements in the "Eastern Bloc" Countries: Case Studies. Springer Nature, 2023.
