= A Warning (film) =

A Warning (Výstraha)
- Directed by: Miroslav Cikán
- Written by: Marie Majerová
- Starring: Jiří Dohnal, Josef Mixa, and Vladimír Petruška.
- Production company: Filmové studio Barrandov
- Release date: 1953
- Running time: 99 minutes
- Country: Czechoslovakia

A Warning (Výstraha) is a 1953 Czechoslovak drama film, directed by Miroslav Cikán. It stars Jiří Dohnal, Josef Mixa, and Vladimír Petruška.

== Cast ==
- Jirí Dohnal as Klement Gottwald
- Josef Mixa as Trnka
- Vladimír Petruska as Zbuch
- Zdenek Kryzánek as Vanek
- Vladimír Smeral as Hanka
