= Na růžích ustláno =

- Directed by: Miroslav Cikán
- Written by: Miroslav Cikán; Jaroslav Mottl; Bohumír Polachs
- Screenplay by: Václav Wasserman
- Starring: Antonie Nedošinská; Lída Baarová; Marie Tauberová
- Cinematography: Jaroslav Blažek
- Music by: Milos Smatek; Jaromír Weinberger
- Production company: Lloydfilm
- Release date: 1935
- Running time: 96 minutes
- Country: Czechoslovakia
- Language: Czech

Na růžích ustláno is a 1935 Czechoslovak film, directed by Miroslav Cikán. It stars Antonie Nedošinská, Lída Baarová, and Marie Tauberová.

== Cast ==
- Antonie Nedošinská as Haugwitzová
- Lída Baarová as Mariana
- Marie Tauberová as Klárka
- Jindřich Plachta as Haugwitz
- Jirí Plachý as Garden
- Ladislav Pešek as Kuropkin
- Eduard Šlégl as Ladman
- Jaroslav Marvan as Hubácek, reditel hotelu
- Stanislav Neumann as Kominík
- Darja Hajská as Gineta
- Milada Smolíková as Osetrovatelka
- Marie Kučerová as Kucharka
- Ladislav Hemmer as Hejsek
