= Pavel Šporcl =

Czech violinist

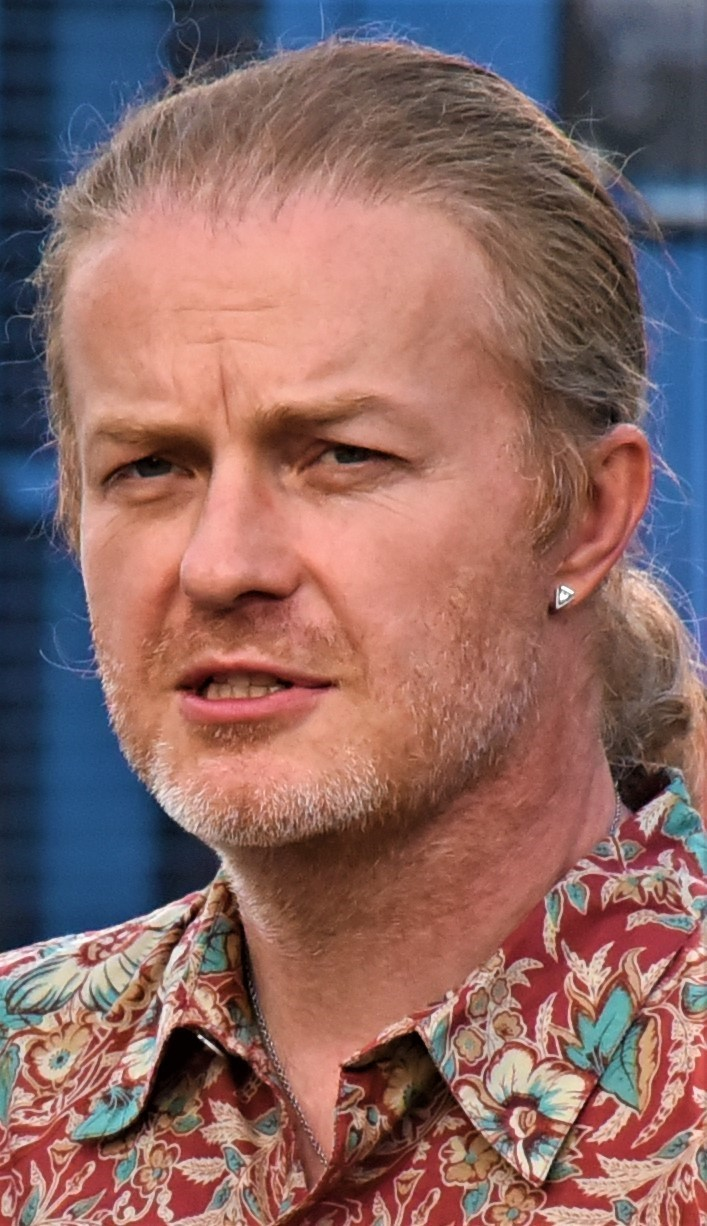
- Pavel Šporcl in 2020
- Born: 25 April 1973 (age 52); České Budějovice, Czechoslovakia
- Occupation: Violinist
- Spouse: Barbora Kodetová (2015–present)
- Children: Lily Marie, Violetta, Sophia

Pavel Šporcl (born 25 April 1973) is a Czech violinist.

He was a notable pupil of Václav Snítil. Studied also with Itzhak Perlman, Dorothy Delay and Eduard Schmieder. He combines a talent for classical music with a rather unorthodox presence, with a characteristic headscarf.

Šporcl is married to actress Barbora Kodetová. They have three daughters: Lily Marie (born 15 February 2001), Violetta (born 26 July 2007) and Sophia (born 24 August 2009).
