= Lidé na kře =

1937 film

- Swedish theatrical release poster
- Directed by: Martin Frič
- Written by: Václav Wasserman
- Based on: Lidé na kře by Vilém Werner
- Starring: František Smolík; Zdeňka Baldová
- Cinematography: Ferdinand Pečenka
- Edited by: Jan Kohout
- Music by: Julius Kalaš
- Production company: Ufa
- Distributed by: Ufa
- Release date: 5 February 1937
- Running time: 88 minutes
- Country: Czechoslovakia
- Language: Czech

Lidé na kře (English: People on the Iceberg) is a 1937 Czech drama film directed by Martin Frič. The film was nominated for Best Foreign Film at the 5th Venice International Film Festival. František Smolík won the Award for the Best Czechoslovak actor in 1937.

== Cast ==
- František Smolík as Professor Václav Junek
- Zdeňka Baldová as Anna Junková, Professor's wife
- Ladislav Boháč as Zdeněk Junek
- Lída Baarová as Dr. Pavla Junková
- Hana Vítová as Hanka Junková
- Ladislav Pešek as Jirka Junek
- Růžena Šlemrová as Aunt Máli
- Ella Nollová as Maid Barča
- Bedřich Veverka as Dr. Vladimír Řípa
- Jiří Dohnal as Soccer player Franta Cikán
- Ladislav Hemmer as Film director Frank Pavelka
- Marie Glázrová as Marta, Zdeněk's girlfriend
- Jaroslav Marvan as Minister Bedřich Peterka
- Zvonimir Rogoz as Film businessman Bruckman
