= Kdybych byl tátou =

- Directed by: Miroslav Cikán
- Starring: Jindřich Plachta, Hana Vítová, and Bohunka Nosková.
- Production company: Nationalfilm
- Release date: 1939
- Running time: 85 minutes
- Country: Czechoslovakia

Kdybych byl tátou is a 1939 Czechoslovak comedy film, directed by Miroslav Cikán. It stars Jindřich Plachta, Hana Vítová, and Bohunka Nosková.
