= Fourteen at the Table =

1943 Czechoslovak film

- Directed by: Oldřich Nový; Antonín Zelenka
- Written by: Josef Mach; Ossi Oswalda
- Starring: Karel Höger; Ludvík Veverka; Helena Friedlová
- Cinematography: Ferdinand Pečenka
- Music by: Julius Kalaš
- Production company: Lucernafilm
- Release date: 1943
- Running time: 85 minutes
- Country: Czechoslovakia
- Language: Czech

Fourteen at the Table (Czech: Čtrnáctý u stolu) is a 1943 Czechoslovak crime comedy film directed by Oldřich Nový and Antonín Zelenka, starring Karel Höger, Ludvík Veverka and Helena Friedlová.

It was made in German-occupied Protectorate of Bohemia and Moravia. The screenplay was based on a story by the retired German silent film actress Ossi Oswalda. The film's sets were designed by the art director Jan Zázvorka.

== Plot ==
Thirteen guests meet at the home of Mayor Bartoš. They are disturbed by the number, so they hope and wait for another guest to appear. A fourteenth guest does arrive, with the coincidental surname of Čtrnáctý ("Fourteenth"). The young man, Pavel Čtrnáctý, is attracted to the mayor's daughter, Ema. He could not resist and kisses her. The girl suddenly becomes the subject of gossip.

== Cast ==
- Karel Höger as Pavel Čtrnáctý
- Ludvík Veverka as Bartos
- Helena Friedlová as Bartosová
- Dagmar Frýbortová as Ema
- Vladimír Majer as Dr. Viktorin
- Karel Dostal as Bersecký
- Růžena Šlemrová as Bersecká
- Libuše Zemková as Lydie
- Raoul Schránil as Alexy
- Jiřina Petrovická as Bibi
- Ella Nollová as Hedvika, grandmother
- Zvonimir Rogoz as Linhart
- František Filipovský as Kilián

== Bibliography ==
- Bock, Hans-Michael & Bergfelder, Tim. The Concise CineGraph. Encyclopedia of German Cinema. Berghahn Books, 2009.
