= Lost in the Suburbs =

- Directed by: Martin Frič
- Starring: Karel Höger
- Cinematography: Karl Degl
- Edited by: Jan Kohout
- Release date: 1948
- Running time: 92 minutes
- Country: Czechoslovakia
- Language: Czech

Lost in the Suburbs (Czech: Návrat domů, alternative English title: Homecoming) is a 1948 Czechoslovak drama film starring Karel Höger about soldiers returning from World War II. Based on the story written by Leopold Lahola the movie was directed by Martin Frič. Though some critics are ranking this movie among Top 10 of Frič's fruitfull filmography, at the time of its release the film met mostly negative reviews and even today is still ignored by publishers as well as by public. Probably due to the depressive nature of the movie's story.

== Plot ==
The story begins on 16 May 1945. The war is over, citizens of Prague cheer the Czechoslovak soldiers returning from Eastern front. As soon as the military parade is over, they see that the return to the peaceful life is no way easy. And for the first lieutenant Kliment Mareš (Karel Höger), the only native of Prague in his unit, there is no reason to celebrate the peace because as he step by step finds out all his pre-war life is ruined: his mother and sister were executed by Nazis and their flat is inhabited by strangers, his friends from the club either died or emigrated, and his former girlfriend already married another man.

When Mareš realizes that the men and women from his unit are the only family left, he gratefully welcomes the new orders and leaves Prague - to recapture the Sudetenland.

== Cast ==
- Karel Höger
- Běla Jurdová
- Josef Pehr
- František Smolík
- Terezie Brzková
- Zdenka Procházková
- Zdeněk Štěpánek
- Milada Smolíková
- Libuše Zemková
- Ladislav Kulhánek
- Ella Nollová
- Ota Motyčka
