= Její pastorkyně =

- Directed by: Miroslav Cikán
- Starring: Marie Ptáková, Leopolda Dostalová, and Jiří Dohnal.
- Production company: Lloydfilm
- Release date: 1938
- Country: Czechoslovakia

Její pastorkyně is a 1938 Czechoslovak film directed by Miroslav Cikán. It stars Marie Ptáková, Leopolda Dostalová, and Jiří Dohnal, and is based on a play by Gabriela Preissová.
