= Jiří Kodet =

Czech actor

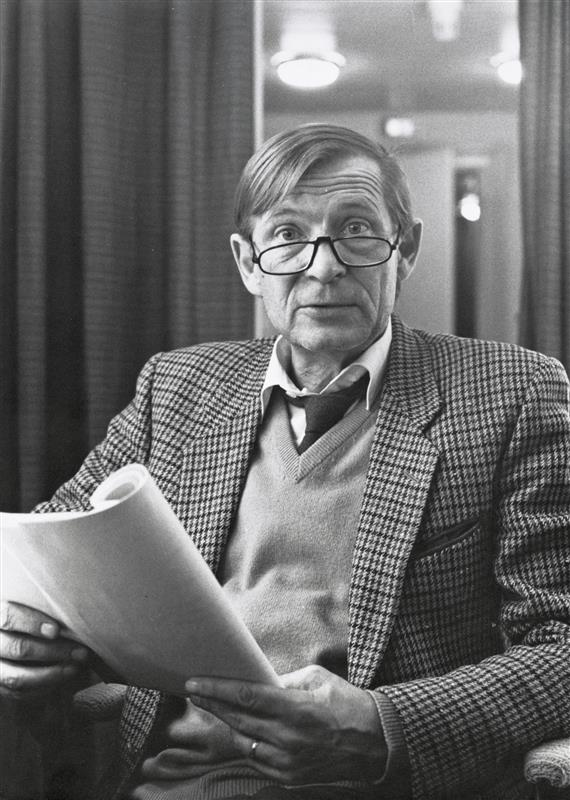
- Born: 6 December 1937; Prague, Czechoslovakia
- Died: 25 June 2005 (aged 67); Prague, Czech Republic
- Occupation(s): Actor, Television series
- Years active: 1951–2003
- Spouse(s): Soňa Kodetová (1969–2005); Renata Cihelková
- Children: Barbora Kodetová; Ian Kodet; Karolína Kodetová
- Relatives: Vendelín Budil (great-grandfather); Emanuel Kodet (grandfather); Jiří Steimar (grandfather); Anna Steimarová (grandmother); Jiřina Steimarová (mother); Jan Kodet (father); Kristian Kodet (brother); Evelyna Steimarová (sister); Anna Polívková (niece)

Jiří Kodet (6 December 1937 – 25 June 2005) was a Czech actor. He appeared in more than ninety films between 1951 and 2003. His mother Jiřina Steimarová and his daughter Barbora Kodetová are also actresses.

== Selected filmography ==
Film
Year	Title	Role	Notes
1999	Divided We Fall		
1999	Cosy Dens		
1982	How the World Is Losing Poets		
1981	Waiter, Scarper!		
1977	The Apple Game		
1975	The Day That Shook the World		
1973	Lovers in the Year One		
1972	Morgiana		
1967	Hotel for Strangers		
1964	Atentát		

TV
Year	Title	Role	Notes
1979	Arabela		
