= The Beginning of a Novel =

Opera by Leoš Janáček

- Opera by Leoš Janáček
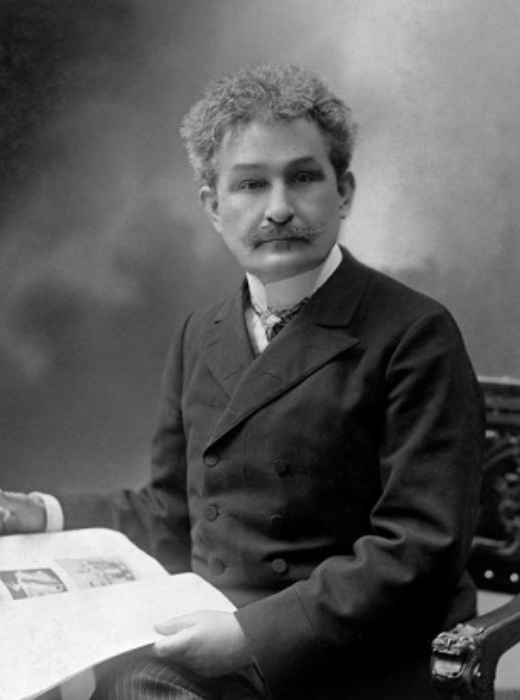
- Janáček in 1904
- Native title: Počátek Románu
- Librettist: Jaroslav Tichý
- Language: Czech
- Based on: short story by Gabriela Preissová
- Premiere: 2 October 1894; National Theatre, Brno

The Beginning of a Novel (Počátek Románu) is an opera by Leoš Janáček to a Czech libretto by Jaroslav Tichý after a short story by Gabriela Preissová, itself suggested by a painting by Jaroslav Věšín. Composed in 1891, it was first produced on 2 October 1894 in Brno.

Although not a successful work, it is significant because it marks the beginning of Janáček's association with Gabriela Preissová, who also wrote the story on which Jenůfa, his first great opera, was based. Originally planned as a singspiel with spoken dialogue, The Beginning of a Novel is unusual among Janáček's stage works in being a "numbers opera" rather than composed with continuous music.

== Synopsis ==
Poluška, a pretty village girl, flirts with Baron Adolf despite her engagement to Tonek, a boy of her own class. Tonek is downcast. The gamekeeper catches Adolf and Poluška courting and tells Poluška's parents. Her father disapproves, but her mother is excited and arranges a meeting with Baron Adolf's father. This does not go well, and Poluška returns chastened to the faithful Tonek, while the Baron finds happiness with a Countess. The characters reflect on the folly of mésalliance.
