= Případ Z-8 =

- Directed by: Miroslav Cikán
- Starring: Josef Bek, Milica Kolofiková, and Jiřina Petrovická.
- Production company: Ceskoslovenský Státní Film
- Release date: 1948
- Running time: 88 minute
- Country: Czechoslovakia

Případ Z-8 is a 1948 Czechoslovak drama film, directed by Miroslav Cikán. It stars Josef Bek, Milica Kolofiková, and Jiřina Petrovická.
