= U pěti veverek =

- Directed by: Miroslav Cikán
- Starring: Jaromíra Pacová, Jindřich Plachta, and Růžena Nasková.
- Production company: Lucernafilm
- Release date: 1944
- Running time: 79 minutes
- Country: Czechoslovakia

U pěti veverek is a 1944 Czechoslovak comedy film, directed by Miroslav Cikán. It stars Jaromíra Pacová, Jindřich Plachta, and Růžena Nasková.

== Cast ==
- Jaromíra Pacová
- Jindřich Plachta
- Růžena Nasková
- Jana Romanová
- Eva Klenová
- Jan Pivec
- Ladislav Pešek
- Jaroslav Průcha
