= Václav Snítil =

Czech musician

Václav Snítil (1 March 1928, in Hradec Králové, Czech Republic – 19 July 2015, in Prague) was a Czech violinist and music educator.

He first studied with his teacher being Czech violinist Jaroslav Kocián for 8 years from 1942 to 1950, and composition under famed Czech composer Vítězslav Novák for 3 years between 1946 and 1949. In 1953, he graduated from the Academy of Performing Arts in Prague. He briefly worked as a concert master in the Army Opera and Drama Orchestra of the National Theatro in Prague.

As a soloist, he started with works by Robert Schumann, KA Hartmann (Czech premieres), and other major works for violins. He regularly performed in the Prague Spring International Music Festival. His repertoire includes a number of works by contemporary composers (Krejčí, Sommer, Srnka, Kalabis, and Bárta), some of which was credited. He toured extensively thanks to the music scene in Czechoslovakia in places such as Japan.

He also did Chamber music. He was a member of multiple groups: the Vlach Quartet (1957-1970), the Smetana Trio, and from 1975-1988 he was the artistic director and first violinist of the Czech Nonet. In the late 1950s until 1969, he was a member of the famous Chamber music ensemble Ars Rediviva.

From 1964 until his death, he was a professor at the very university he graduated from. His most notable pupils include Václav Hudeček and Pavel Šporcl.

== Bibliography ==
- Czechoslovak musical vocabulary individuals and institutions / II (Prague 1963)
- Jan Kozák et al .: Czechoslovak musical artists and chamber ensembles (SHV, Prague 1964)
- Czechoslovak biographical dictionary of the 20th century (Academia, Prague 1992)
- Jos. Tomeš et al .: Czech biographical dictionary of the 20th Century / II (Paseka, Prague 1999)
