= Turbina =

1941 Czech historical drama film

Turbine
- Theatrical release poster
- Directed by: Otakar Vávra
- Written by: Otakar Vávra
- Based on: Turbina by Karel Matěj Čapek-Chod
- Starring: František Smolík; Lída Baarová; Vlasta Matulová
- Cinematography: Václav Hanuš
- Edited by: Antonín Zelenka
- Music by: Jiří Srnka
- Production company: Slaviafilm
- Distributed by: Slaviafilm
- Release date: 17 October 1941
- Running time: 96 minutes
- Country: Czechoslovakia
- Language: Czech

Turbine (Czech: Turbina) is a 1941 Czech historical drama film directed by Otakar Vávra and starring František Smolík, Lída Baarová and Vlasta Matulová. It is based on a novel by Karel Matěj Čapek-Chod.

== Synopsis ==
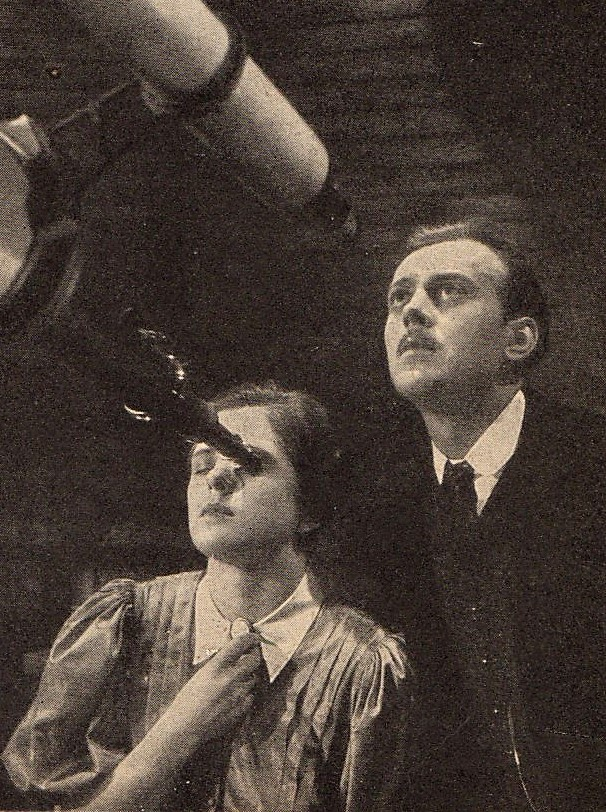
Vlasta Matulová (left) and Karel Höger in Turbina

The film takes place in the 19th century, when the family of Imperial councilman is experiencing a transition from traditional social values to the new social order, which it does not understand, but must face up to.

== Production ==
It was shot at the Hostivař Studios in Prague.

== Cast ==
- František Smolík as Mills owner Imperial councilman Ullík
- Lída Baarová as Tynda, Ullík's daughter
- Vlasta Matulová as Marie, Ullík's daughter
- Rudolf Hrušínský as Bonďa, Ullík's son
- Eduard Kohout as Artuš Fabian, Ullík's brother-in-law
- Marie Glázrová as Žofka, Fabian's lover
- Jaroslav Vojta as Night Guard Nezmara
- Vítězslav Vejražka as Václav, Nezmara's son
- Karel Höger as Dr. Arnošt Zouplna
- Jindřich Plachta as Arnošt's father
