= The Minister's Girlfriends =

1940 film by Vladimír Slavínský

The Minister's Girlfriend
- Directed by: Vladimír Slavínský
- Written by: Vladimír Slavínský
- Starring: Adina Mandlová; František Paul
- Cinematography: Ferdinand Pečenka
- Edited by: Jan Kohout
- Music by: Josef Dobeš; Jiří Mihule
- Production company: Brom
- Distributed by: Brom
- Release date: 22 March 1940
- Running time: 94 minutes
- Country: Czechoslovakia
- Language: Czech

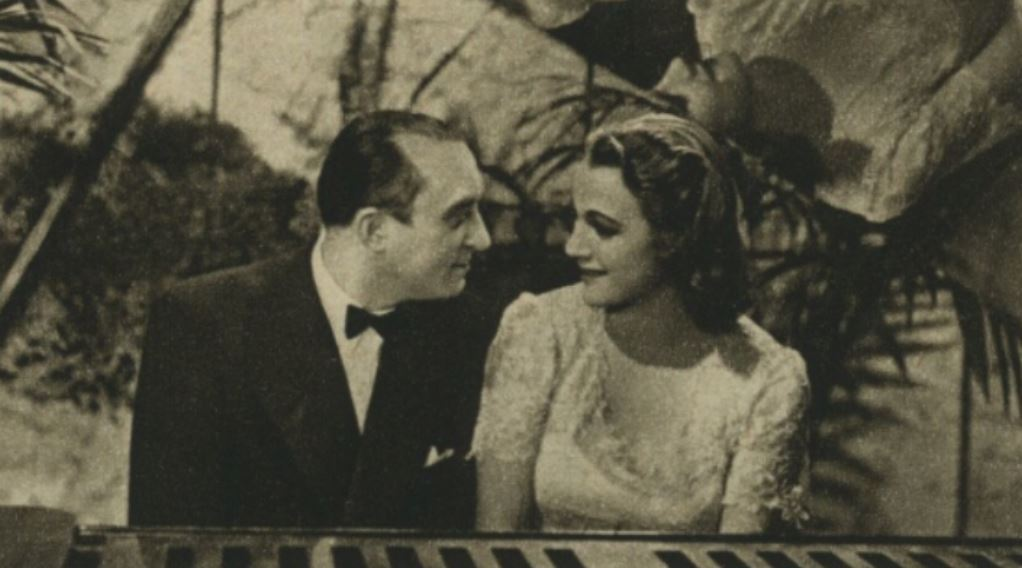
Oldřich Nový and Adina Mandlová in the film The Minister's Girlfriend

The Minister's Girlfriend (Czech: Přítelkyně pana ministra) is a Czech comedy film directed by Vladimír Slavínský.

== Cast ==
- Adina Mandlová as Julinka Svobodová
- František Paul as František Hrubý, owner of an import company
- Zdeňka Baldová as Marie Hrubá
- Oldřich Nový as Jan Hrubý
- František Kreuzmann as Head clerk Hrubý's company
- Jaroslav Marvan as Minister of Commerce Jaroslav Horák
- Světla Svozilová as Seamstress Pokorná
- Bedřich Veverka as Mirek Lukeš
- Raoul Schránil as Karel Hájek
- Václav Vydra as Italian supplier R. Rossi-Rosůlek
