= Paklíč =

- Directed by: Miroslav Cikán
- Starring: Oldřich Nový, Jiřina Steimarová, and Jaroslav Marvan.
- Production company: Nationalfilm
- Release date: 1944
- Running time: 96 minute
- Country: Czechoslovakia

Paklíč is a 1944 Czechoslovak criminal comedy film, directed by Miroslav Cikán. It stars Oldřich Nový, Jiřina Steimarová, Josef Kemr and Jaroslav Marvan.
