= Zdenka Procházková =

Czech actress (1926–2021)

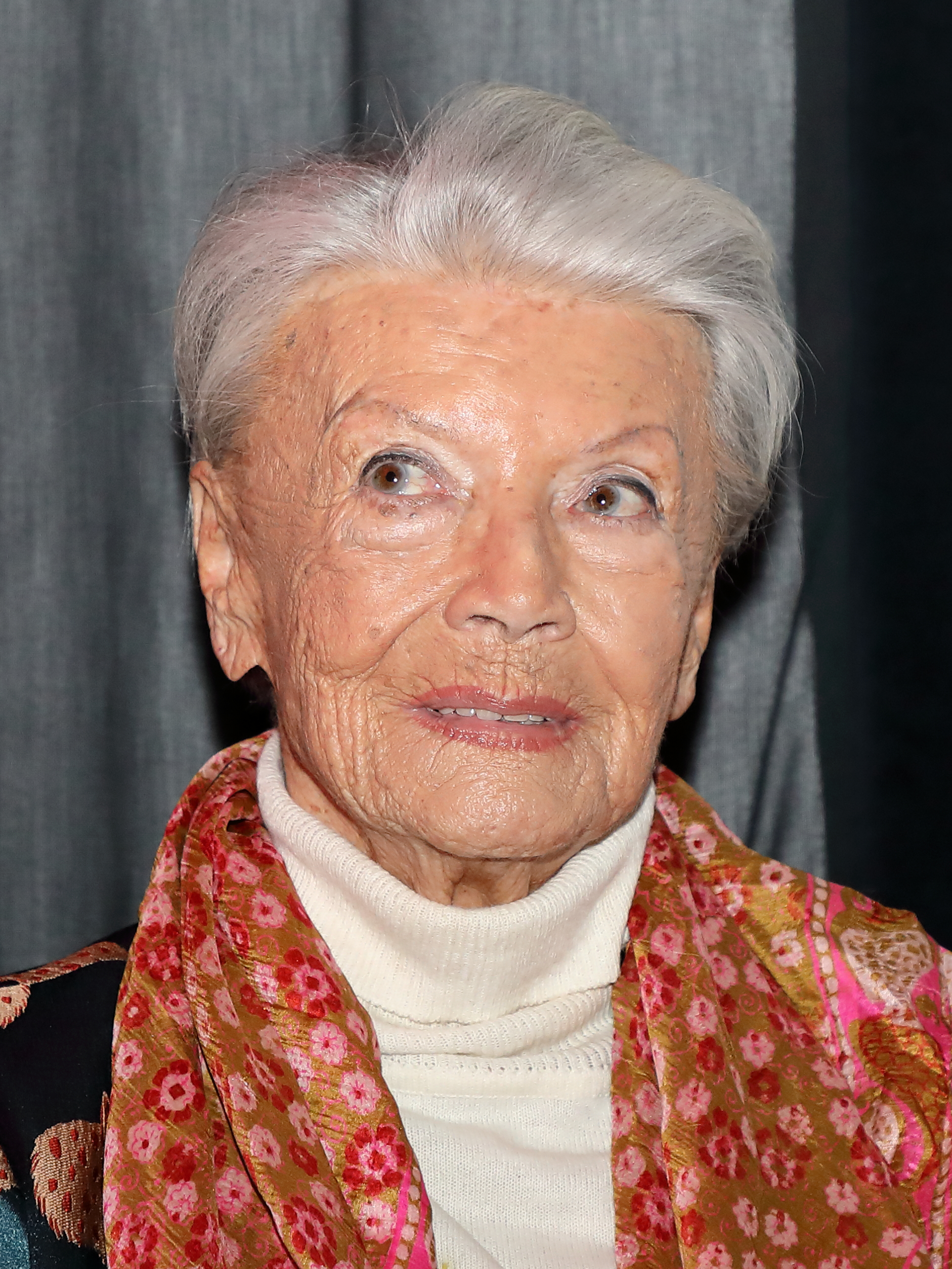
- Procházková in 2019
- Born: 4 April 1926; Prague, Czechoslovakia
- Died: 25 August 2021 (aged 95)
- Occupation: Actress
- Years active: 1946–2021
- Spouse(s): Karel Höger; Erich Hartmann

Zdenka Procházková (4 April 1926 – 25 August 2021) was a Czech actress.

== Life ==
Procházková was married to Karel Höger, who she starred with in the 1949 film A Dead Man Among the Living. They later divorced. She died on 25 August 2021, aged 95. She was buried at Vyšehrad Cemetery in Prague.

== Selected filmography ==
- Lost in the Suburbs (1948)
- A Dead Man Among the Living (1949)
- Distant Journey (1949)
- Steam Above a Pot (1950)
- May Events (1951)
- The Fifth Horseman Is Fear (1965)
- Hospital at the End of the City (television, 1977)
- Upír z Feratu (1982)
- Návštěvníci (television, 1983)
- Ulice (television, 2005)
- The Devil's Mistress (2016)
