= Barbora Kodetová =

Czech actress

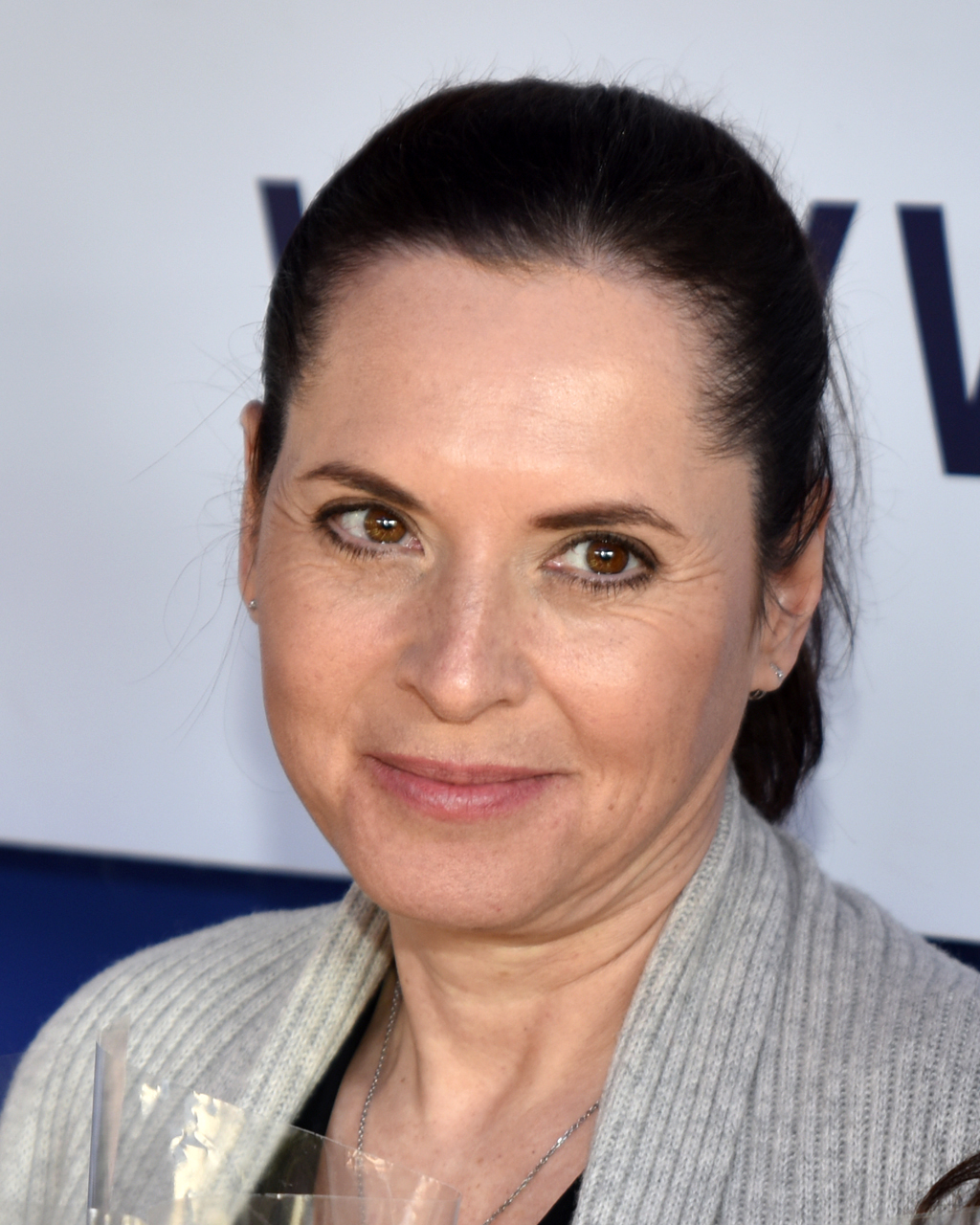
- Kodetová in 2022
- Born: 6 September 1970 (age 56); Prague, Czechoslovakia
- Occupation: Actress
- Years active: 1987–present
- Spouse: Pavel Šporcl (2015–present)
- Children: Lily Marie, Violeta, Sophie
- Relatives: Vendelín Budil (great-great-grandfather); Emanuel Kodet (great-grandfather); Jiří Steimar (great-grandfather); Anna Steimarová (great-grandmother); Jiřina Steimarová (grandmother); Jan Kodet (grandfather); Jiří Kodet (father); Soňa Kodetová (mother); Kristian Kodet (uncle); Evelyna Steimarová (aunt); Ian Kodet (brother); Anna Polívková (cousin); Vendula Prager-Rytířová (cousin)

Barbora Kodetová (born 6 September 1970) is a Czech actress perhaps best known internationally for her portrayal of Paul Atreides' concubine Chani in the 2000 television miniseries Frank Herbert's Dune and its 2003 sequel, Frank Herbert's Children of Dune.

She is the daughter of Czech actor Jiří Kodet, granddaughter of Czech actress Jiřina Steimarová and comes from a large family of actors. She is the cousin of actress Anna Polívková. Barbora is married to violinist Pavel Šporcl since 1 May 2015. She has three daughters - Lily Marie (born 15 February 2001), Violeta (born 26 July 2007) and Sophia (born 24 August 2009).

== Filmography ==
- Fantaghirò 2 (1992) TV series .... Catherine
- Fantaghirò 3 (1993) TV series .... Catherine
- Učitel tance (1995) .... Lydie
- Rivers of Babylon (1998) .... Lenka
- Der Starkare (1999) .... Nora
- "Případy detektivní kanceláře Ostrozrak" (2000) TV series .... Julie
- Dune (2000) .... Chani
- Children of Dune (2003) .... Chani
- The Prince & Me (2004) .... English Teacher's Assistant
- Redakce (2004) .... editor-in-chief Alice Poláková (2004–2005)
- Tristan & Isolde (2006) .... Lady Marke
- Peklo s princeznou (2009) .... Nanny Bětuše
- A Son's War (2010) .... Františka Wiener
