= Rozina, the Love Child =

1945 Czechoslovak drama film

- Directed by: Otakar Vávra
- Screenplay by: Otakar Vávra
- Story by: Václav Řezáč
- Based on: Rozina sebranec by Zikmund Winter
- Produced by: Karel Šilhánek
- Starring: Marie Glázrová; Zdeněk Štěpánek
- Cinematography: Jan Roth
- Edited by: Antonín Zelenka
- Music by: Jiří Srnka
- Production companies: Lucernafilm; Státní výroba filmů
- Distributed by: Státní půjčovna filmů
- Release date: 14 December 1945
- Running time: 94 minutes
- Country: Czechoslovakia
- Language: Czech

Rozina, the Love Child (Czech: Rozina sebranec) is a 1945 Czechoslovak drama film directed by Otakar Vávra. The film starred Marie Glázrová.

== Cast ==
- Marie Glázrová as Rozina
- Zdeněk Štěpánek as Prior Antonín
- Ladislav Boháč as Craftsman Nikolo
- František Kreuzmann as Guildmaster Giovanni Karf
- Jan Pivec as Craftsman Potměbílý
- Gustav Hilmar as Blacksmith Jan Turek
- Saša Rašilov as Brother Bartolo
- Antonín Solc as Father Bonifác
- Lola Skrbková as Cook Afra
- Zdeňka Baldová as Marriage broker Straková
- Marie Vášová as Maid Manda Váňová
