= Humoreska =

1939 film

- Directed by: Otakar Vávra
- Written by: Karel Matěj Čapek-Chod; Otakar Vávra
- Starring: Rudolf Hrušínský
- Release date: 1939
- Running time: 86 minutes
- Country: Czechoslovakia
- Language: Czech

Humoreska is a 1939 Czechoslovak drama film directed by Otakar Vávra.

== Cast ==
- Rudolf Hrušínský as Young Josef Hupka
- Vladimír Salač as Teenage Hynek
- Jaroslav Průcha as Middle-aged Josef Hupka
- Ladislav Boháč as Adult Hynek
