= Auntie's Fantasies =

1941 film

- Directed by: Martin Frič
- Written by: Martin Frič
- Starring: Růžena Nasková
- Cinematography: Ferdinand Pecenka
- Edited by: Jan Kohout
- Release date: 1941
- Running time: 78 minutes
- Country: Czechoslovakia
- Language: Czech

Auntie's Fantasies (Czech: Tetička) is a 1941 Czech comedy film written and directed by Martin Frič.

== Cast ==
- Růžena Nasková as Berta, aunt
- Ferenc Futurista as Hynek
- František Smolík as MUDr. Jelínek
- Theodor Pištěk as Eduard Svagrovský
- Jaroslav Marvan as Arnost Dusbaba, prokurista
- Růžena Šlemrová as Marenka Dusbabová
- Jiří Dohnal as Jindrich Dusbaba
- Miloš Nedbal as Cenek Felix
- Zdeňka Baldová as Felixová
- Lída Chválová as Slávka Felixová
