= Lola Skrbková =

Czech actress

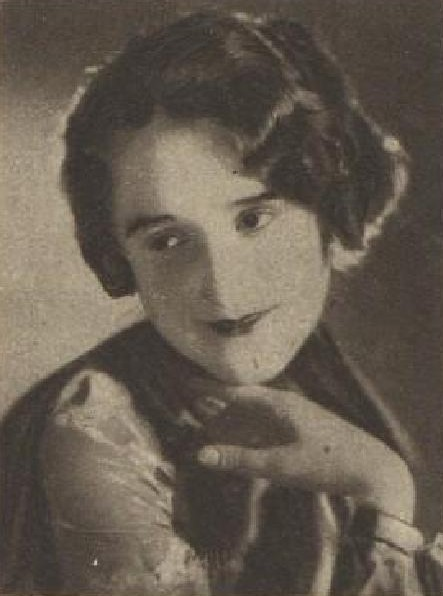
- Born: Aloisie Skrbková; 16 February 1902; Čáslav, Austria-Hungary
- Died: 28 September 1978 (aged 76); Brno, Czechoslovakia (now Czech Republic)
- Occupation: Actress
- Years active: 1937–1971

Lola Skrbková, real name Aloisie Skrbková (16 February 1902 – 28 September 1978) was a Czech actress. She starred in the 1969/1970 film Witchhammer under director Otakar Vávra. She also worked on several films with the influential Devětsil artist Emil František Burian, who directed her in his 1939 adaptation of a Božena Benešová novel, Věra Lukášová.

== Selected filmography ==
- Rozina, the Love Child (1945)
