= Na konci města =

- Directed by: Miroslav Cikán
- Starring: Miloš Nedbal, Gustav Heverle, and Vlasta Vlasáková.
- Edited by: Antonín Zelenka
- Production company: Studio Umeleckých Filmu Praha
- Release date: 1955
- Running time: 97 minutes
- Country: Czechoslovakia

Na konci města is a 1955 Czechoslovak drama film, directed by Miroslav Cikán. It stars Miloš Nedbal, Gustav Heverle, and Vlasta Vlasáková.
