= May Events =

- Directed by: Václav Berdych; Martin Frič
- Written by: Josef Neuberg; František Vlček
- Starring: Jaroslav Marvan
- Cinematography: Rudolf Milič
- Edited by: Jan Kohout
- Release date: 1 June 1951
- Running time: 88 minutes
- Country: Czechoslovakia
- Language: Czech

May Events (Czech: Bylo to v máji) is a Czech comedy film directed by Václav Berdych and Martin Frič. It was released in 1951.

== Cast ==
- Jaroslav Marvan as Jan Šebesta, heating engineer
- Ella Nollová as Růžena Šebestová
- Jana Dítětová as Lída Šebestová, saleswoman
- Miloš Vavruška as Josef Brejcha, striker
- Otto Motyčka as Václav Hrabě, shoemaker
- Milada Smolíková as Eliska Hrabetová
- Milan Balašov as Jirka Šebesta, apprentice
- Milada Kemlinková as Věrka Šebestová
- Bohuš Hradil as Ing. Votruba
- Theodor Pištěk as Burger, master
- Mirko Čech as Šimek
- Antonín Holzinger as Doubek, welder
- Eman Fiala as Koula, gunner
- Rudolf Lampa as Skála, editor
- Karel Houska as Štorkán, millwright
- Josef Chvalina as Franta Kadlec
- Fanda Mrázek as Baďura
- Ladislav Kulhánek as Válek
- Zdenka Procházková as Nováková, the saleswoman
- Alena Kadeřábková as salesgirl Libichová
- Radim Nikodém as Bonbon
- Jindra Hermanová as Mrs. in the shop
- Alois Dvorský as old man in the parade
- Vladimír Dvorský as role unspecified
- František Miroslav Doubrava as Soukup
- Ferdinand Jarkovský as Technopol gatekeeper
- Dagmar Hyková as daughter of the Hraběta family
- Hynek Němec as Jedlička, a worker
- Jaroslav Heyduk as Gustav Režný
- Josef Najman as worker Novotný
- Stanislav Lužický as role unspecified
- Vladimír Klemens as plumber
- Karel Friml as role unspecified
