= The Heroes Are Silent =

1946 Czechoslovak war drama film

- Hrdinové mlčí
- Directed by: Miroslav Cikán
- Written by: Vladimír Tůma
- Produced by: Zdeněk Reimann
- Starring: Ladislav Boháč; Zdeněk Dítě; František Filipovský.
- Cinematography: Václav Hanuš
- Edited by: Antonín Zelenka
- Music by: Miloš Smatek
- Production companies: Československá filmová společnost Nationalfilm
- Release date: 4 October 1946
- Running time: 70 minutes
- Country: Czechoslovakia

The Heroes Are Silent (Czech: Hrdinové mlčí) is a 1946 Czechoslovak war drama film directed by Miroslav Cikán and starring Ladislav Boháč, Zdeněk Dítě and František Filipovský. The film's sets were designed by the art director Štěpán Kopecký. It was one of a large number of films portraying Czech wartime resistance made in the years after the conflict had ended.

== Synopsis ==
After his brother is killed by the German occupiers, a publisher joins the Czech resistance and destroys a railway bridge in a bid to rescue hostages from execution.

== Cast ==
- Ladislav Boháč as Vojtéch Tomek
- Zdeněk Dítě as Jan Tomek
- František Filipovský as Vilém Kolta
- Josef Pařízek as Vítek Dolina
- Jarmila Smejkalová as Eva Matoušková
- Sylva Langová as Marta Vondrová
- Marie Blažková as Anna Frýbová
- Jindřich Plachta as teacher Josef Frýba
- Vítězslav Vejražka as Kurt Seppke
- Bohuš Hradil as Peitsch
- František Vnouček as Franz Wessely
- Josef Kotapiš as Tonda, soldier at a train station
- Eman Fiala as a boastful soldier
- Vladimír Hlavatý as a fighter with a ribbon
- Vladimír Šmeral as a partisan disguised as a gendarme
- Bedřich Vrbský as lawyer Ladislav Kovář
- Zdeněk Řehoř as a railway clerk

== Bibliography ==
- Karl, Lars & Skopal, Pavel. Cinema in Service of the State: Perspectives on Film Culture in the GDR and Czechoslovakia, 1945–1960. Berghahn Books, 2015.
- Wohl, Eugen & Păcurar, Elena. Language of the Revolution: The Discourse of Anti-Communist Movements in the "Eastern Bloc" Countries: Case Studies. Springer Nature, 2023.
