= Božena Obrová =

Slovak film actress

- Born: 10 April 1927; Trenčianska Teplá, Czechoslovakia
- Died: 27 December 1975 (aged 48); Prague, Czechoslovakia
- Occupation: Actress
- Years active: 1947–1972 (film & TV)

Božena Obrová (10 April 1927 – 27 December 1975) was a Slovak actress. She played the female lead in several Czechoslovak films, including Katka (1950).

== Selected filmography ==
- Don't You Know of an Unoccupied Flat? (1947)
- Katka (1950)
- Únos (1953)
- Music from Mars (1955)
- Focus, Please! (1956)
- Florián (1961)
- Vánice (1962)
- Tchýně (1963)

== Bibliography ==
- Manvell, Roger. The Cinema, 1951. Penguin Books, 1951. p. 210.
- Sylvestrová, Marta. Český filmový plakát 20. století. Moravská galerie v Brně, 2004. p. 242.
