= In the Still of the Night (film) =

- Directed by: Zdeněk Gina Hašler
- Written by: Vítězslav Nezval; Jan Červenka
- Produced by: Oldřich Papež
- Starring: Lída Baarová; Lilly Hodáčová; Karel Höger
- Cinematography: Ferdinand Pečenka
- Edited by: Jan Kohout
- Music by: Miloš Smatek; Jiří Traxler
- Production company: Lucernafilm
- Distributed by: Lucernafilm
- Release date: 17 January 1941
- Running time: 89 minutes
- Country: Czechoslovakia
- Language: Czech

In the Still of the Night (Czech: Za tichých noci) is a 1941 Czech drama film directed by Zdeněk Gina Hašler and starring Lída Baarová, Lilly Hodáčová and Karel Höger.

It was made during the German occupation of Czechoslovakia. The film's sets were designed by the art director Ferdinand Fiala. It was distributed in Germany by Tobis Film.

== Cast ==
- Lída Baarová as Jana Radimská
- Lilly Hodáčová as Marianne Singer
- Karel Höger as Záviš Herold
- Karel Hašler as Karel Hašler
- Rudolf Deyl as Der Hofrat
- Antonie Nedošinská as Frau/Paní Bilian
- Růžena Šlemrová as Frau/Paní Rajská
- Světla Svozilová as Rosa
- Marie Blažková as Anna Trunečková
- Karel Veverka as Bohdan Kaminsky
- Raoul Schránil as Peter Rajský
- Vladimír Řepa as Pfarrer
- František Kreuzmann as Baron
- František V. Kučera as Senior Clerk

== Bibliography ==
- Bock, Hans-Michael & Bergfelder, Tim. The Concise CineGraph. Encyclopedia of German Cinema. Berghahn Books, 2009.
