= Marie Glázrová =

Czech film actress

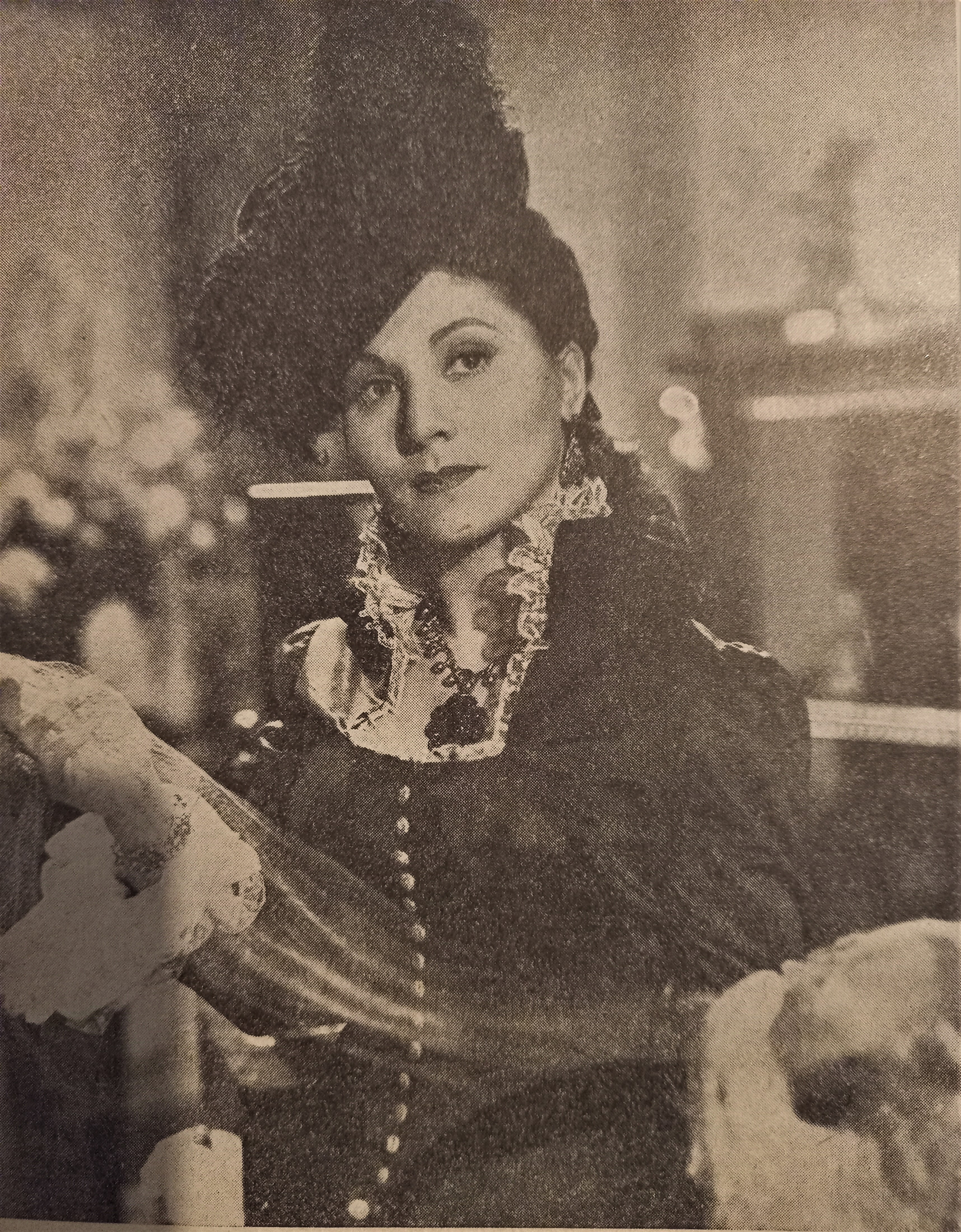
- Glázrová in 1943
- Born: 11 July 1911; Horní Suchá, Austria-Hungary
- Died: 19 February 2000 (aged 88); Prague, Czech Republic
- Occupation: Actress
- Years active: 1934–1985 (film)

Marie Glázrová (11 July 1911 – 19 February 2000) was a Czech film and stage actress. Born in Moravia when it was still part of Austria-Hungary, she studied acting at the Prague Conservatory. She appeared frequently at the National Theatre and after her screen debut in The Last Man (1934), acted regularly in films. She was married to the opera singer Eduard Haken.

== Selected filmography ==
- The Last Man (1934)
- Lidé na kře (1937)
- Svět kde se žebrá (1938)
- V pokušení (1939)
- Pelikán má alibi (1940)
- Turbina (1941)
- Nocturnal Butterfly (1941)
- Gabriela (1942)
- Okouzlená (1942)
- The Girl from Beskydy Mountains (1944)
- Rozina, the Love Child (1945)
- The Avalanche (1946)

== Bibliography ==
- Bartošek, Luboš. Náš film: kapitoly z dějin, 1896-1945. Mladá fronta, 1985. p. 233.
- Jiras, Pavel. Barrandov: Zlatý věk. Gallery, 2003. p. 369.
- Mabary, Judith A. Contextualizing Melodrama in the Czech Lands: In Concert and on Stage. Routledge, 2020.
