= Matouš the Cobbler =

Matouš the Cobbler (O ševci Matoušovi)
- Directed by: Miroslav Cikán
- Starring: Ladislav Pešek, Vladimír Řepa, and Jaroslav Průcha.
- Production company: Ceskoslovenská Filmová Spolecnost
- Release date: 1948
- Running time: 96 minutes
- Country: Czechoslovakia

Matouš the Cobbler (Czech: O ševci Matoušovi) is a 1948 Czechoslovak drama film, directed by Miroslav Cikán. It stars Ladislav Pešek, Vladimír Řepa, Jaroslav Průcha, and Josef Kemr.

== Cast ==
- Ladislav Pesek
- Vladimír Repa
- Jaroslav Prucha
- Dagmar Sedlácková
- Marie Nademlejnská
