= Don't You Know of an Unoccupied Flat? =

1947 film

- Directed by: Borivoj Zeman
- Written by: Ján Kadár; Borivoj Zeman
- Produced by: Otakar Sedlacek
- Starring: Josef Pehr; Bozena Obrová; Eduard Dubský
- Cinematography: Petr Rovný
- Edited by: Josef Dobrichovský
- Music by: Jan Kaláb; Oldrich Letfus; Jirí Sust
- Production company: Ceskoslovenská Filmová Spolecnost
- Distributed by: Státní Pujcovna Filmu
- Release date: 14 November 1947
- Running time: 89 minutes
- Country: Czechoslovakia
- Language: Czech

Don't You Know of an Unoccupied Flat? (Czech: Nevíte o bytě?) is a 1947 Czech comedy film directed by Borivoj Zeman and starring Josef Pehr, Bozena Obrová and Eduard Dubský. It was shot at the Barrandov Studios in Prague and on location around the Vrsovice area of the city. The film's sets were designed by the art director Miroslav Pelc.

== Synopsis ==
During the postwar housing shortage, a young Czech actor and a Slovak woman are brought together when they are forced to share an apartment together.

== Cast ==
- Josef Pehr as Josef
- Božena Obrová as Elena
- Eduard Dubský as Kuèera
- Nelly Gaierová as Rybová
- Jindřich Plachta as Dédécek
- Jan Pivec as Vejvoda
- Josef Krikava as Simunek
- Libuše Bokrová as Bytná
- Josef Kemr as Bytový optimista
- Emil Bolek as Stábní rotmistr
- Mirko Čech as Clen orchestru
- Antonín Holzinger as Prúvodcí tramvaje
- Jana Hrdlicková as Verjdova dcera
- Vlasta Jelínková as Majitelka bytu s andélem
- Miloš Kopecký as Komisar
- Ota Motyčka as Výrobce slavíkú
- Rudolf Princ as Úrednic Sulc
- Jana Romanová as Majka
- Zdeněk Savrda as Hostinský
- Václav Trégl as Referent
- Milada Wildova as Pracovnice bytovélho úradu
- Lumír Brož as Trumpetista
- Mirko Erben as Zadatel
- Hans Hofer as Muz v tramvaji
- Emanuel Hříbal as Úrednik
- Jiří Jirmal as Kytarista
- Arnošt Kavka as Pianista
- Karel Sidla as Basista
- Alois Zelenka as Prekupník

== Bibliography ==
- Černík, Jan. Český technický scénář 1945–1962. Palacký University Olomouc, 2021.
- Wohl, Eugen & Păcurar, Elena. Language of the Revolution: The Discourse of Anti-Communist Movements in the "Eastern Bloc" Countries: Case Studies. Springer Nature, 2023.
