= Glück unterwegs =

- Directed by: Miroslav Cikán
- Starring: O.W. Fischer, Max Gülstorff, and Kurt Hoffmann-Leydorff.
- Production company: Prag-Film
- Release date: 1944
- Running time: 88 minutes
- Countries: Germany; Czechoslovakia
- Language: German

Glück unterwegs is a 1944 Germany-Czechoslovak musical comedy film, directed by Miroslav Cikán. It stars O.W. Fischer, Max Gülstorff, and Kurt Hoffmann-Leydorff.

== Cast ==
- Max Gülstorff
- O.W. Fischer as Kapellmeister Florian
- Paul Kemp as Dramaturg Gustav
- Zita Kabátován as Dorle
