= Jaroslav Mach =

Czech sport shooter

Personal information
- Born: 4 May 1887

Sport
- Sport: Sports shooting

Jaroslav Mach (4 May 1887 – ?) was a Czech sport shooter. He competed at the 1924 Summer Olympics and the 1936 Summer Olympics.
