= Zlaté dno =

1942 film

Zlaté dno is a Czech comedy film. It was released in 1942.
