= Pelikán má alibi =

- Directed by: Miroslav Cikán
- Starring: Miroslav Homola, Marie Glázrová, Jaroslav Marvan.
- Production company: Nationalfilm
- Release date: 1940
- Running time: 78 minutes
- Country: Czechoslovakia

Pelikán má alibi is a 1940 Czechoslovak criminal comedy film, directed by Miroslav Cikán. It stars Miroslav Homola, Marie Glázrová, and Jaroslav Marvan.

== Cast ==
- Miroslav Homola as Pelikán
- Marie Glázrová as Jarmila
- Jaroslav Marvan as Moudrý
- Jindrich Plachta as Mácek
- Stanislav Neumann as Kalabis
