= Karel and I =

Karel and I (Karel a já)
- Directed by: Miroslav Cikán
- Starring: Jiří Dohnal, Jana Dítětová, Jaroslav Marvan.
- Production company: Nationalfilm
- Release date: 1942
- Running time: 87 minutes
- Country: Czechoslovakia
- Language: Czech

Karel and I (Karel a já) is a 1942 Czechoslovak comedy film, directed by Miroslav Cikán. It stars Jiří Dohnal, Jana Dítětová, Jaroslav Marvan.

== Cast ==
- Hana Vítová
- Rùzena Nasková
- Jana Dítetová
- Jirí Dohnal
