= Jiřina Steimarová =

Czech actress

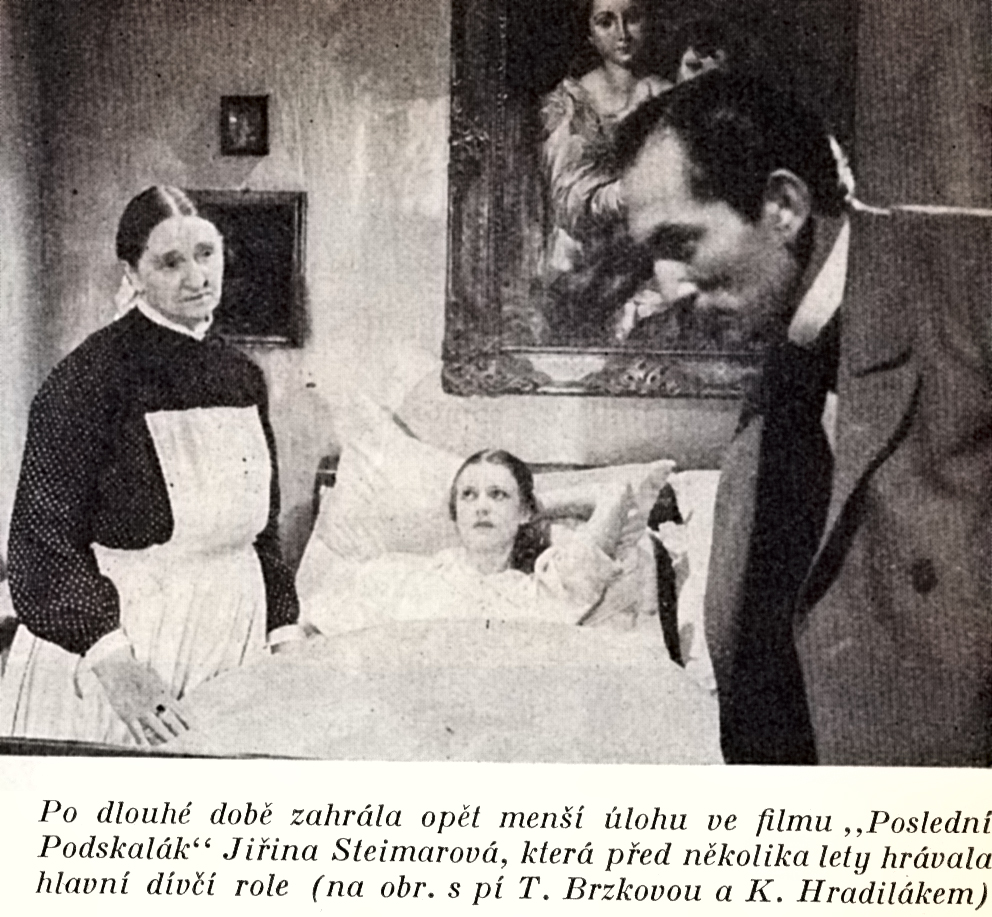
- Jiřina Steimarová (middle) in the film Poslední Podskalák (1940)
- Born: 24 January 1916; Prague, Bohemia, Austria-Hungary
- Died: 7 October 2007 (aged 91); Prague, Czech Republic
- Occupation: Actress
- Years active: 1926–2003
- Spouse(s): Jaroslav Juhan; Jan Kodet
- Children: Julie Juhanová; Jiří Kodet; Evelyna Steimarová
- Relatives: Vendelín Budil (grandfather); Jiří Steimar (father); Anna Steimarová (mother); Miloš Steimar (brother); Barbora Kodetová (granddaughter); Anna Polívková (granddaughter); Vendula Prager-Rytířová (granddaughter)

Jiřina Steimarová (24 January 1916 – 7 October 2007) was a Czech film and television actress.

== Life ==
Jiřina Steimarová was born in Prague, Bohemia, Austria-Hungary on 24 January 1916. Her maternal grandfather was legendary theatre actor and director Vendelín Budil. Both of her parents were actors as well. She made her screen debut in the 1933 film Ecstasy. She appeared in nearly 40 films and TV shows during her career. Steimarová was a cast member of the National Theatre since 1933. She was married to sculptor Jan Kodet and later to racing driver Jaroslav Juhan. After Juhan emigrated to South America, she was fired from the National Theatre. Her children were actors Evelýna Steimarová and actor Jiří Kodet. Her granddaughters are Barbora Kodetová and Anna Polívková.

Jiřina Steimarová died on 7 October 2007, aged 91.

== Selected filmography ==
- Ecstasy (1933)
- The Last Man (1934)
- Na Svatém Kopečku (1934)
- The Masked Lover (1940)
- Irca's Romance (1936)
- A Woman as Good as Her Word (1953)
- Dog's Heads (1955)
- The Good Soldier Schweik (1956)
- September Nights (1957)
- I Dutifully Report (1958)
