= Veselá bída =

- Directed by: Miroslav Cikán
- Starring: Jarmila Ksírová, František Kreuzmann, and Hana Vítová.
- Production company: Lucernafilm
- Release date: 1939
- Country: Czechoslovakia
- Language: Czech

Veselá bída is a 1944 Czechoslovak musical comedy film, directed by Miroslav Cikán. It stars Jarmila Ksírová, František Kreuzmann, and Hana Vítová.
