= Gabriela (1942 film) =

- Directed by: Miroslav Josef Krnanský
- Written by: Miroslav Josef Krnanský; Vladimír Neff
- Starring: Marie Glázrová; Karel Höger; Vladimír Leraus
- Cinematography: Václav Hanus
- Edited by: Marie Bourová
- Music by: Jaroslav Křička; Milos Smatek
- Production company: Nationalfilm
- Distributed by: Nationalfilm
- Release date: 13 February 1942
- Running time: 80 minutes
- Country: Czechoslovakia
- Language: Czech

Gabriela is a 1942 Czech drama film directed by Miroslav Josef Krnanský and starring Marie Glázrová, Karel Höger and Vladimír Leraus.

It was made in Prague during the German occupation of Czechoslovakia. The film's sets were designed by the art director Alois Mecera.

== Cast ==
- Marie Glázrová as Gabriela Tuzarová
- Karel Höger as Petr Tuzar
- Vladimír Leraus as Stepán Tuzar
- Zdeňka Baldová as Zofka
- Jirí Steimar as Michal
- Marie Rosulková as Irena Seborová
- Jindřich Plachta as Kudrna
- Vladimír Salač as Jindrísek
- Theodor as Palous
- Josef Gruss as Carda
- František Filipovský as Frantisek Kalista
- Ada Dohnal as Auditor
- Bohus Záhorský as Auditor
- F. X. Mlejnek as Postman
- Alois Dvorský as Machine-man
- Karel Kolár as Matousek
- Karel Máj as Marek
- Frantisek Lasek as Coffee House Guest
- Milos Subrt as Coffee House Guest
- Slávka Rosenbergová as Coffee House Guest
- Emanuel Kovarík as Pilferer
- Antonín Jirsa as Porter
- Vladimír Stros as Receptionist
- Frantisek Paul as Watchman
- Svetla Svozilová as Annoying Woman
- Ada Karlovský as Party Guest
- Bohumil Langer as Party Guest
- Jaroslav Hladík as Party Guest
- Josef Dvorský as Party Guest
- Jirina Hladikova as Party Guest
- Hugo Huska as Party Guest
- Ema Kubalova as Party Guest
- Milena Velísková as Concert Listener

== Bibliography ==
- Bohuslav Hoffmann. Vladimír Neff. Československý spisovatel, 1982.
