= Provdám svou ženu =

1941 Czechoslovak comedy film

- Directed by: Miroslav Cikán
- Written by: Jindřich Hořejší; Julius Lébl
- Starring: Vlasta Burian; Svetla Svozilová; Jaroslav Marvan
- Production company: Slaviafilm
- Release date: 1941
- Country: Czechoslovakia

Provdám svou ženu is a 1941 Czechoslovak comedy film directed by Miroslav Cikán. It stars Vlasta Burian, Světla Svozilová, and Jaroslav Marvan.
