= Raoul Schránil =

Czech actor

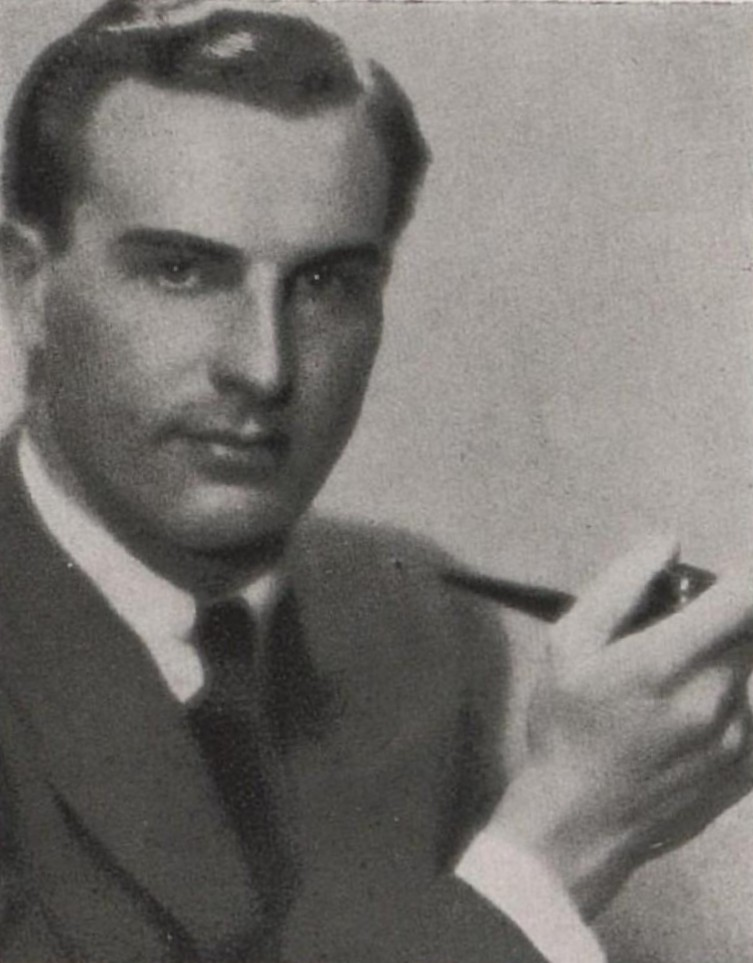
- Born: 24 March 1910; Most, Bohemia, Austria-Hungary
- Died: 20 September 1998 (aged 88); Prague, Czech Republic
- Occupation: Actor
- Years active: 1919–1941
- Spouses: Růžena Havelková (m. 1939–1955): Věra Lišková
- Children: Xandra Schránilová

Raoul Marian Kristian Schránil (24 March 1910 – 20 September 1998) was a Czech film actor.

== Life ==
Schránil was born in Most on 24 March 1910. His father Rudolf Schránil was a government secretary at the Ministry of Agriculture. His mother Alexandra Poláková was an opera singer. Shortly after his birth, he moved to Vienna with his parents. During the World War I he was sent to live with his grandmother in Chotětov. After the war his family moved to Prague. Through his well-connected family, he met many prominent people, such as people such as the opera singer Emmy Destinn. During his teens Schránil was expelled from high school in Prague and was sent to study in Germany and later in Dijon, France. At Dijon lyceum he first performed at a cabaret. He was fluent in Czech, French, German and English. After the recommendation from his cousin, a well-known film director Karl Anton, he was hired in Vlasta Burian's theatre in 1935.

His first role was in the film Milan Rastislav Štefánik, where he played a French officer. In the 1930s and 1940s he was often cast as a romantic lead. During the German occupation he started his own cinema in Chotětov, which he patriotically named Vlast (lit."Homeland"). Schránil was a member of the Czechoslovak resistance and he help two escaped British POWs to hide until the end of the war. After the communist coup in 1948 he was put on the blacklist because of his bourgeois origin and was only able to perform with a small touring theatre company. In the 1950s was arrested, due to a suspicion that he wants to emigrate. He spent one year in custody before he was released. He had to work as a labourer until he was able to find work in a cabaret and provincial theatres. In the 1970s he was offered to be part of the ensemble of the National Theatre. However he wasn't approved by the political leadership. He was only able to work in the National theatre as a tour organizer and a translator. He died in Prague on 20 September 1998.

His daughter Xandra Schránilová was an actress in Semafor theatre.

== Selected filmography ==
- Vzdušné torpédo 48 (1937)
- Cause for Divorce (1937)
- Battalion (1937)
- The Merry Wives (1938)
- Christian (1939)
- Eva Fools Around (1939)
- The Minister's Girlfriends (1940)
- Poznej svého muže (1940)
- The Catacombs (1940)
- In the Still of the Night (1941)
- A Charming Man (1941)
- Nebe a dudy (1943)
- The Second Shot (1943)
- Fourteen at the Table (1943)
- Silvery Wind (1954)
- How to Drown Dr. Mracek, the Lawyer (1974)
- Love Between the Raindrops (1979)
- Big Beat (1993)
