= Alena (1947 film) =

- Directed by: Miroslav Cikán
- Starring: Miluse Zoubková, Vladimír Repa, and Terezie Brzková.
- Edited by: Antonín Zelenka
- Production company: Ceskomoravska Vyroba Celovecernich Filmu Praha
- Release date: 1947
- Running time: 95 minutes
- Country: Czechoslovakia

Alena is a 1947 Czechoslovak comedy film, directed by Miroslav Cikán. It stars Miluse Zoubková, Vladimír Repa, and Terezie Brzková.
