= Karel Höger =

Czech actor (1909–1977)

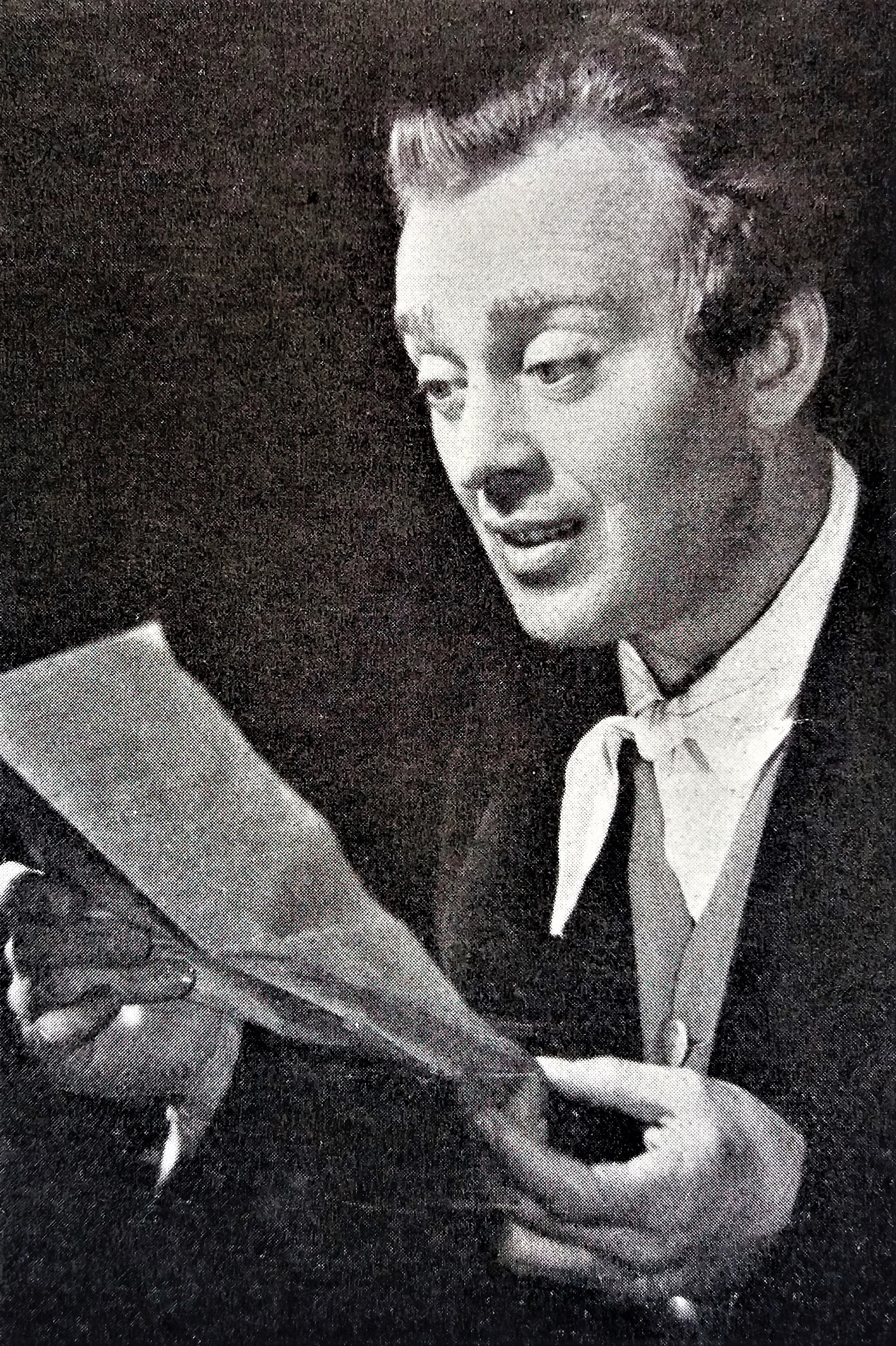
- Höger in 1946
- Born: 17 June 1909; Brno, Moravia, Austria-Hungary
- Died: 4 May 1977 (aged 67); Prague, Czechoslovakia
- Occupation: Actor
- Years active: 1939–1977

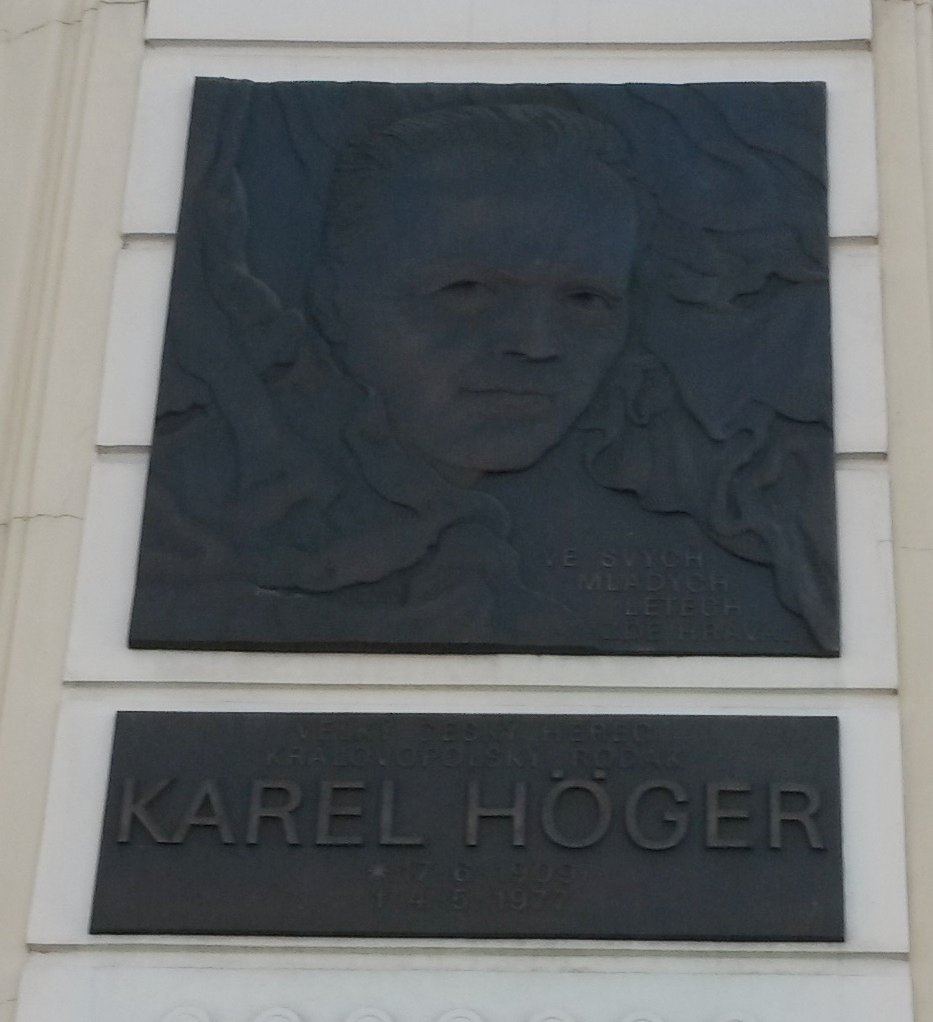
Memorial plaque to actor in Brno

Karel Höger (17 June 1909 – 4 May 1977) was a Czech film actor. He appeared in nearly 100 films between 1939 and 1977.

== Personal life ==
He was married to the actress Zdenka Procházková, who he starred with in the 1949 film A Dead Man Among the Living. They later divorced.

== Selected filmography ==
- In the Still of the Night (1941)
- Enchanted (1942)
- Gabriela (1942)
- Fourteen at the Table (1943)
- The Dancer (1943)
- Lost in the Suburbs (1948)
- Krakatit (1948)
- A Dead Man Among the Living (1949)
- Old Czech Legends (1953)
- Nástup (1953)
- Jan Hus (1954)
- Jan Žižka (1955)
- Vláček Kolejáček (1959)
- The Fabulous Baron Munchausen (1961)
- Lucie (1963)
- I, Justice (1967)
- Noc na Karlštejně (1973)
