= Miroslav Cikán =

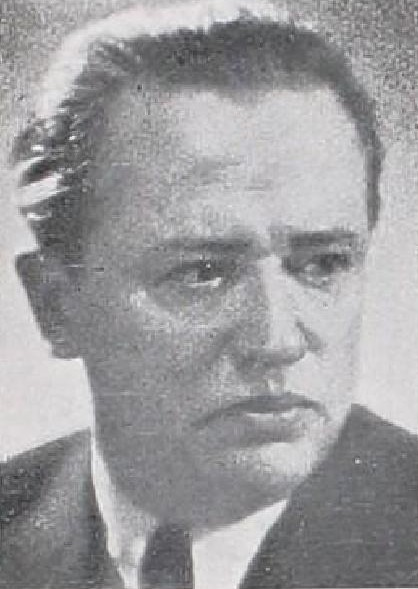
Miroslav Cikán (1896-1962)

Miroslav Cikán (11 February 1896 – 1 February 1962 in Prague) was a Czechoslovak film director. He frequently worked with actors such as Hugo Haas, Jan Werich, and Vlasta Burian.

== Filmography ==
- The Mystery of the Blue Room (1933)
- Dum na predmesti (1933)
- Hrdinný kapitán Korkorán (1934)
- U nás v Kocourkove (1934)
- Na Svatém Kopecku (1934)
- Man in Demand on All Sides (1934)
- Na rùzích ustláno (1935)
- Barbora rádí (1935)
- Král ulice (1935)
- Lojzicka (1936)
- The Comedian's Princess (1936)
- Poslícek lásky (1937)
- Devce za výkladem (1937)
- Vzdusné torpédo 48 (1937)
- Battalion (1937)
- Andula Won (1937)
- Not a Word About Love (1937)
- Její pastorkyne (1938)
- Vandiny trampoty (1938)
- Svet kde se zebrá (1938)
- Forbidden Love (1938)
- Kdybych byl tátou (1939)
- Dobre situovaný pán (1939)
- V pokusení (1939)
- Studujeme za školou (1939)
- Príklady táhnou (1939)
- Eighteen Years Old (1939)
- Finally Alone (1940)
- Happiness for Two (1940)
- Pelikán má alibi (1940)
- For a Friend (1940)
- Provdám svou zenu (1941)
- From the Czech Mills (1941)
- Karel and I (1942)
- U peti veverek (1944)
- Veselá bída (1944)
- Das schwarze Schaf (1944) (as Friedrich Zittau)
- Glück unterwegs (1944) (as Friedrich Zittau)
- Paklíc (1944)
- The Avalanche (1946)
- The Heroes Are Silent (1946)
- Alena (1947)
- Matous the Cobbler (1948)
- Prípad Z-8 (1949)
- Steam Above a Pot (1950)
- The Struggle Will End Tomorrow (1951)
- A Warning (1953)
- Na konci mesta (1955)
- Muž v povětří (1956)
- Jurásek (1957)
- Konec cesty (1960)
