= Jindřich Plachta =

Czech actor (1899–1951)

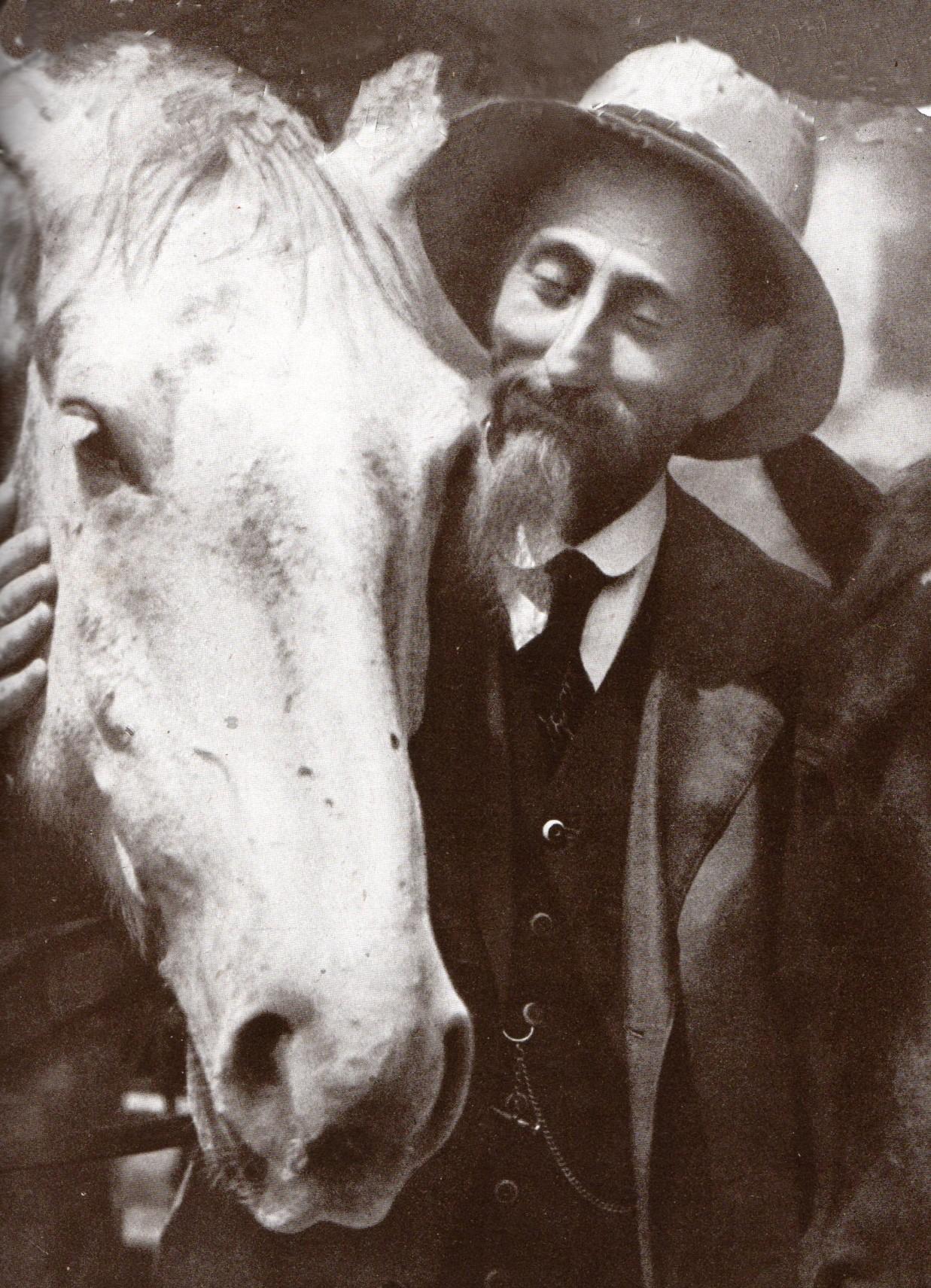
- Jindřich Plachta in 1941
- Born: Jindřich Ferdinand Šolle; 1 July 1899; Plzeň, Bohemia, Austria-Hungary
- Died: 6 November 1951 (aged 52); Prague, Czechoslovakia
- Burial place: Olšany Cemetery, Prague
- Occupation: Actor
- Years active: 1921–1951

Jindřich Plachta (1 July 1899 – 6 November 1951) was a Czech actor and comedian. He appeared in more than 100 films between 1926 and 1951, but he was also an active theatre actor. He was known for his tall, thin figure.

== Life ==
Jindřich Plachta was born Jindřich Ferdinand Šolle on 1 July 1899 in Plzeň. He had two younger siblings. His father was a worker in Škoda Works. Jindřich studied at a business academy in Bakhmut, where his father worked in the 1910s, and at a business academy in Plzeň. His father did not like his son's artistic ambitions, so Jindřich secretly acted in minor roles in a Plzeň theatre. He and his friends then founded an amateur theatre club called Jaro ('spring').

Jindřich had a tall, thin figure and his favorite piece of clothing was a pelerine that fluttered on his body. This is why he earned the nickname Plachta ('sail') from his friends, which became his artistic pseudonym. Due to his frailty, he did not have to enlist in the army after finishing his studies in 1918.

After World War I, Plachta worked as a bank accountant. He was married twice. From his first marriage to Marie Puchernová he had a son Zdeněk and a daughter Alena. However, his wife did not like Plachta's acting career, which led to a divorce. His second wife was Anna Hůlová. Plachta suffered from peptic ulcer disease all his life. He died on 6 November 1951 from liver cancer, aged 52. He is buried at the Olšany Cemetery.

Plachta was a staunch communist and actively supported the building of socialism in Czechoslovakia after World War II. He became one of the artistic icons of the Czechoslovak socialist regime.

== Theatre career ==
When Plachta worked as an accountant in Prague, he performed in Satyr cabaret in the evenings. After the cabaret closed down, he moved to the Červená sedma Theatre, where he worked as a prompter. He was not good at it, but the theatre director saw his acting potential and made him a stand-up comedian. His first appearance was on 31 December 1921. His career was complicated by paralyzing stage fright, but Plachta learned to overcome it and gradually became popular.

Plachta then moved to the Vlasta Burian Theatre, where he played in 1924–1926, 1927–1929 and 1931–1933. In 1929–1930 and 1933–1938, he played at the Osvobozené divadlo theatre. He also played for a short time in several other theatres. Plachta received several offers to play at the National Theatre during his career, but due to his innate modesty and low self-confidence, he was afraid to accept it. However, he played there shortly in 1948–1949. In 1948–1949, he also played at the Estates Theatre (then called Tyl Theatre). His last job (1950–1951) was at the Vinohrady Theatre.

== Film career ==
Both in the theatre and in the film, Plachta often played good-natured, shy, simple, naive and clumsy men, which was his true nature. His roles included recurring professions such as valets, servants, merchants, craftsmen, officials and professors. His first film role was in the silent film Dobrý voják Švejk (1926). He appeared in more than 100 films between 1926 and 1951.

=== Selected filmography ===
- The Lovers of an Old Criminal (1927)
- Father Vojtech (1929)
- Affair at the Grand Hotel (1929)
- Street Acquaintances (1929)
- Imperial and Royal Field Marshal (1930)
- Tonka of the Gallows (1930)
- Such Is Life (1930)
- Business Under Distress (1931)
- Muži v offsidu (1931)
- Anton Spelec, Sharp-Shooter (1932)
- On the Sunny Side (1933)
- The House in the Suburbs (1933)
- Na Svatém Kopečku (1934)
- U nás v Kocourkově (1934)
- Na růžích ustláno (1935)
- The Eleventh Commandment (1935)
- Jánošík (1935)
- Raging Barbora (1935)
- Camel Through the Eye of a Needle (1936)
- Three Men in the Snow (1936)
- Filosofská historie (1937)
- Poslíček lásky (1937)
- Cesta do hlubin študákovy duše (1939)
- Kdybych byl tátou (1939)
- Finally Alone (1940)
- From the Czech Mills (1941)
- Barbora Hlavsová (1942)
- Gabriela (1942)
- The Respectable Ladies of Pardubice (1944)
- Spring Song (1944)
- The Wedding Ring (1944)
- U pěti veverek (1944)
- Řeka čaruje (1945)
- Turbina (1945)
- Pancho se žení (1946)
- Průlom (1946)
- Just Getting Started (1946)
- The Heroes Are Silent (1946)
- Don't You Know of an Unoccupied Flat? (1947)
- Dravci (1948)

== Writing career ==
Plachta also devoted himself to writing short stories, feuilletons and humoresques, but most of them were not successful. After World War II, he wrote the screenplay for the film Pan Novák ("Mr. Novák"), in which he expressed his sympathies for socialism. His only successful work was Pučálkovic Amina (1931), a prose for children about a giraffe who became a family pet.

== Honours ==
Four cities and towns in the Czech Republic have a street named after Jindřich Plachta: Prague (Smíchov), Ostrava, Ústí nad Labem and Františkovy Lázně.

There is a bronze memorial plaque on the house in Perucká Street in Prague-Vinohrady in honour of Plachta. It was created in 1984.
