= Stanislav Neumann =

Czech actor

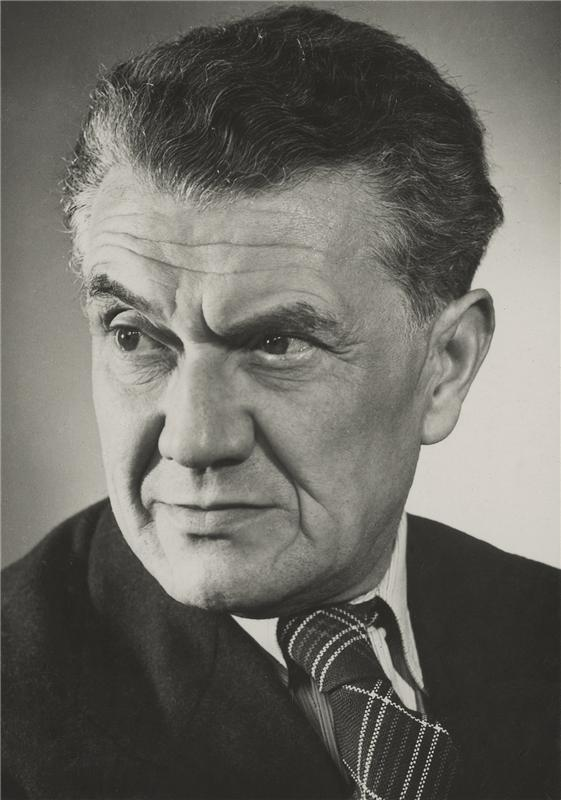
- Stanislav Neumann
- Born: 16 July 1902; Prague, Austria-Hungary
- Died: 19 February 1975 (aged 72); Prague, Czechoslovakia
- Occupation: Actor
- Years active: 1930–1973

Stanislav Neumann (16 July 1902 – 19 February 1975) was a Czech actor. He appeared in more than ninety films from 1930 to 1973.

== Selected filmography ==
Year	Title	Role	Notes
1934	The Little Pet		
1934	U nás v Kocourkově		
1935	Long Live with Dearly Departed		
1935	Na růžích ustláno		
1936	Delightful Story		
1936	Paradise Road		
1937	Lawyer Vera		
1937	Filosofská historie		
1937	Andula Won		
1946	A Big Case		
1947	Nobody Knows Anything		
1948	Old Ironside		
1949	A Dead Man Among the Living		
1952	The Proud Princess		
1956	Against All		
1956	Playing with the Devil		
1959	The Princess with the Golden Star		
