= Das schwarze Schaf (1944 film) =

- Directed by: Miroslav Cikán
- Written by: Harald Bratt; Toni Huppertz
- Starring: Victor Janson, Albert Johannes, and Lotte Koch.
- Production company: Prag-Film
- Release date: 1944
- Countries: Germany; Czechoslovakia
- Language: German

Das schwarze Schaf is a 1944 German/Czechoslovak film, directed by Miroslav Cikán. It stars Victor Janson, Albert Johannes, and Lotte Koch.

== Cast ==
- Victor Janson
- Albert Johannes
- Lotte Koch
- Wilhelm König
- Ernst Legal
