= From the Czech Mills (1941 film) =

1941 Czechoslovak comedy film

- Directed by: Miroslav Cikán
- Starring: Theodor Pištěk; Jindřich Plachta; Svatopluk Beneš
- Production company: Slavia Film
- Release date: 1941
- Country: Czechoslovakia

From the Czech Mills (Z ceských mlýnu) is a 1941 Czechoslovak comedy film directed by Miroslav Cikán. It stars Theodor Pištěk, Jindřich Plachta, and Svatopluk Beneš.
