= Jiřina Petrovická =

Czech actress

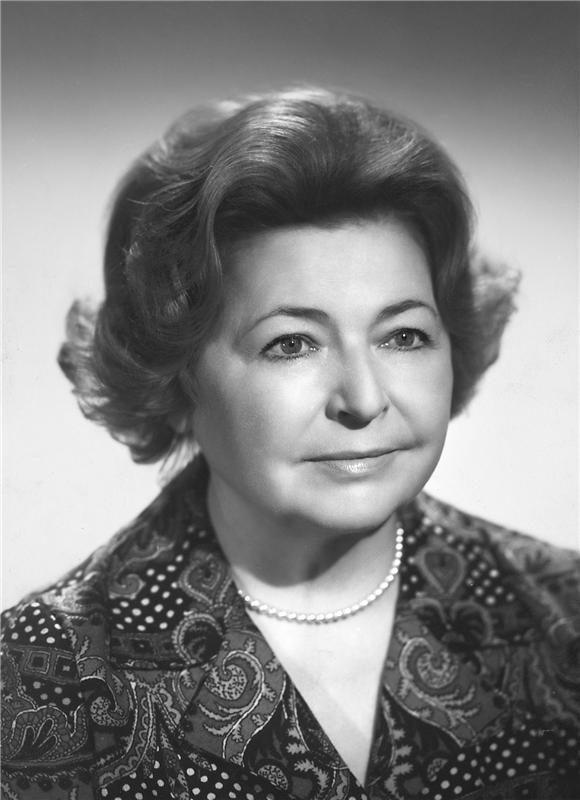
- Born: 30 January 1923; Pardubice, Czechoslovakia
- Died: 10 October 2008 (aged 85); Prague, Czech Republic
- Occupation: Actress
- Years active: 1943–1985

Jiřina Petrovická (30 January 1923 – 10 October 2008) was a Czech film actress. She appeared in 20 films and television shows between 1943 and 1985.

== Selected filmography ==
- Fourteen at the Table (1943)
- Men Without Wings (1946)
- Krakatit (1948)
- Getting on in the World (1948)
- The Secret of Blood (1953)
