= Karel Poláček =

Czech writer, humorist, and journalist (1892–1945)

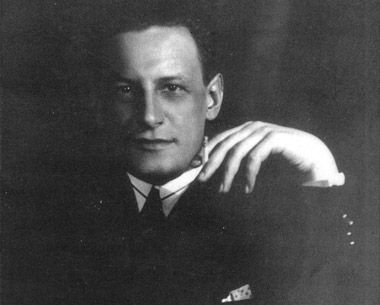
- Poláček before 1925
- Born: 22 March 1892; Rychnov nad Kněžnou, Austria-Hungary
- Died: 21 January 1945 (aged 52); Gliwice, Gau Upper Silesia, Nazi Germany
- Occupations: Writer, humorist
- Writing career
- Language: Czech

Karel Poláček (22 March 1892 – 21 January 1945) was a Czech writer, humorist and journalist of Jewish descent.

== Life ==
Poláček was born in Rychnov nad Kněžnou into the family of a Jewish merchant. He attended the gymnasium there, but did poorly, so he transferred to a secondary school in Prague, from which he graduated in 1912. He then attended the Faculty of Law at Charles University.

He was employed as a legal clerk for a short time. During the First World War he served on the Serbian and Galician fronts. After the war he was employed by the Czechoslovak Committee on Import and Export, but lost his job after he ridiculed the office in one of his short stories called Kolotoč ('The Carousel'); about a family that inherits a carousel but, due to a hyperbureaucratic import/export office, they are not able to sell it abroad.

Josef Čapek offered him support in 1920 and Poláček began contributing to a satirical magazine; Nebojsa ('Dreadnought'). He then started writing short stories, feature stories and columns using the pseudonym Kočkodan (can be translated as 'guenon' or 'marmoset'). Shortly after that, in 1922, the Čapek brothers introduced him to the editor of Lidové noviny (a popular newspaper of that time). The newspaper published his feature stories and popular series called "Soudničky" ('judge stories'; generally humorous stories about the court system). His work was published in this newspaper until the Nazi occupation came and it was forbidden under the Nuremberg Laws.

He then went to work for the Jewish religious community. On 5 July 1943, he was transported to the Theresienstadt concentration camp and then transferred to Auschwitz. He died in the Gleiwitz camp on 21 January 1945.

== Work ==
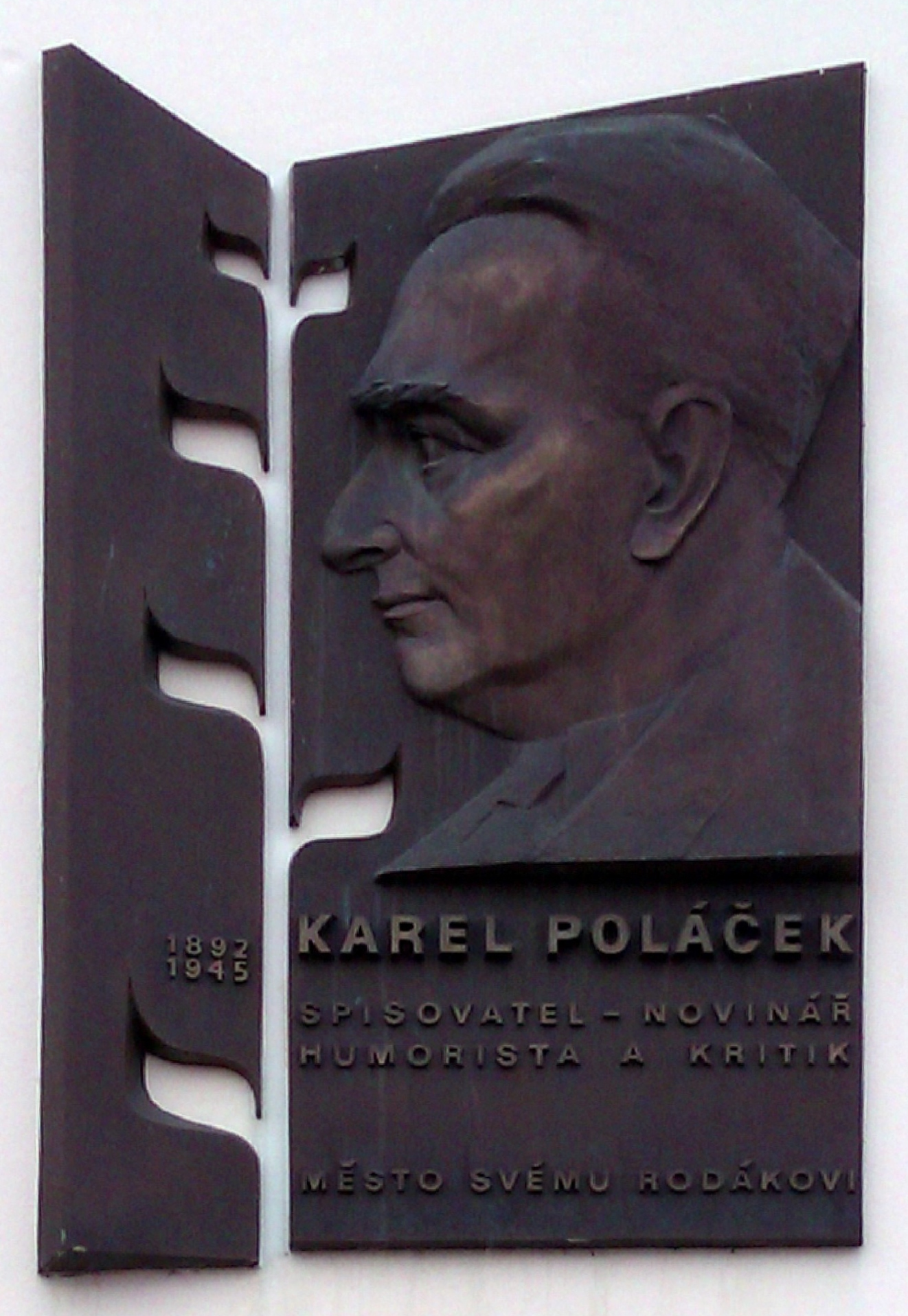
Memorial plaque to Poláček in Rychnov nad Kněžnou

His novels represent the most authentic values of Czech interwar prose. He was close to the humanistic credo of his generation of writers such as Karel Čapek and František Langer. At the same time he reflects in his "humorous" (but only at first sight) novels the deep tragedy of the petty bourgeois, small-town and suburban world in which hypocrisy, mental smallness, narrow-mindness and spiritual poverty wins.

Poláček was able to describe different human types – not only in their variety but also in the art of getting under the mask of their language. At the beginning of his work stand humorous sketches mostly from small-town environments, with caricatured human types, especially from middle-class, often Jewish society.

His first novel was Dům na předměstí (1928, A House in the Suburbs) in which he portrayed the transformation of a "small man" into a dehumanised creature as soon as he is seized with the proprietary instinct to possess. He was widely popular for his humoristic prose such as Muži v offsidu (1931, Men in Offsides, which was made into a movie that year by director Svatopluk Innemann, starring Hugo Haas in the role of Mr. Načeradec) or Michelup a motocykl (1935, Michelup and the Motorcycle).

Much of his work was devoted to a cycle in which he portrayed a small town during the years before World War I. The story is centered around the fate of the tradesman, Štědrý, and his sons. It was supposed to be a pentalogy; the fifth part was written but only fragments survived. The books were published in this order: Okresní město (1936, County Town), Hrdinové táhnou do boje (1936, Heroes go to Battle), Podzemní město (1937, Underground Town) and Vyprodáno (1939, Sold Out).

During the Nazi occupation, in 1941, Poláček's humorous novel Hostinec U kamenného stolu (Tavern with a Stone Table) was published under the name of the painter Vlastimil Rada. It was made into a movie in 1949. After the Second World War, a novel about his childhood in Rychnov nad Kněžnou, Bylo nás pět (lit. 'there were five of us', however translated in English under the title We Were a Handful) was published.
