= Růžena Nasková =

Czechoslovak film actress (1884–1960)

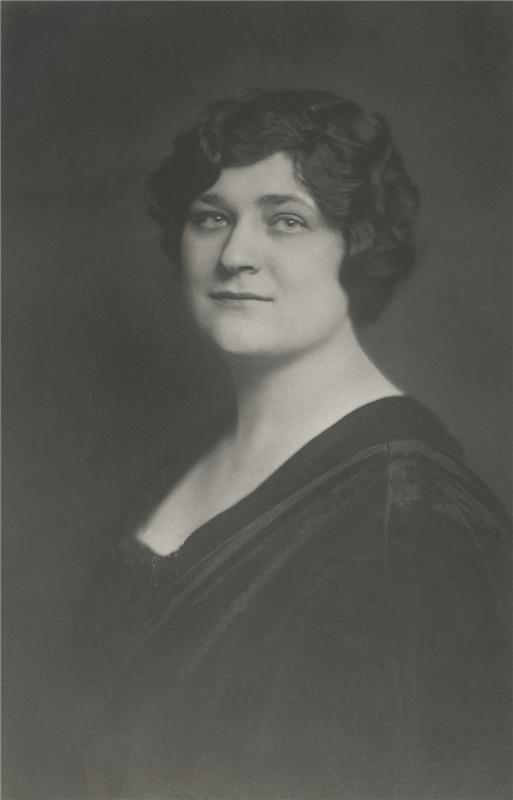
- Born: 28 November 1884; Prague, Bohemia, Austria-Hungary
- Died: 17 June 1960 (aged 75)
- Occupation: Actress
- Years active: 1915–1953

Signature
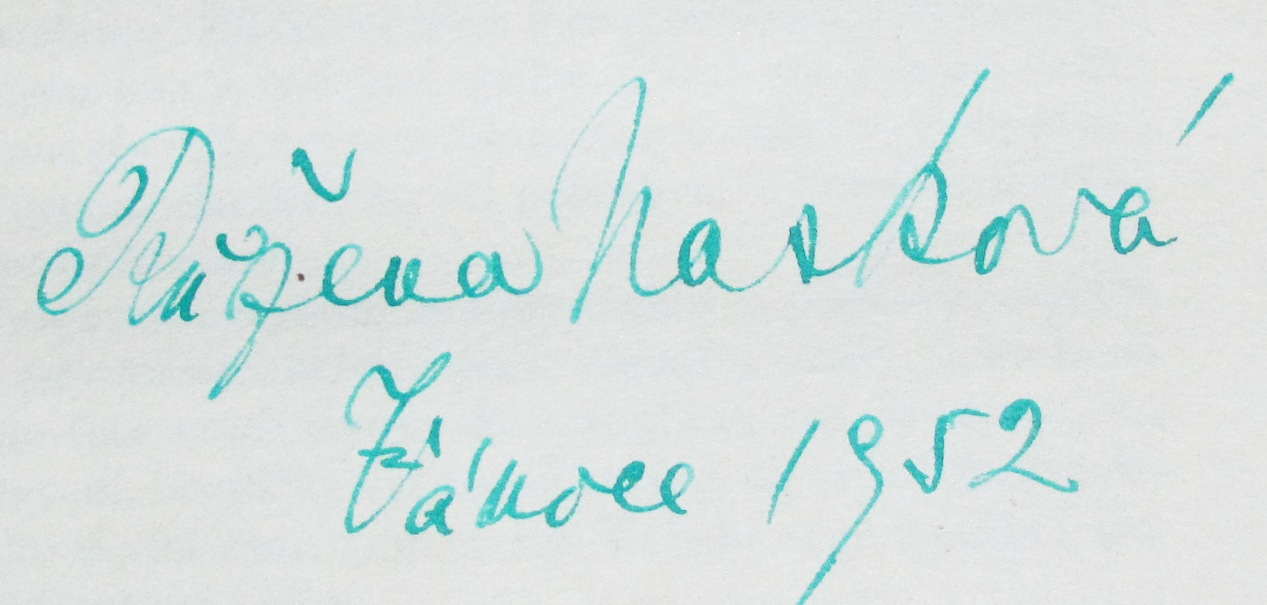

Růžena Nasková (28 November 1884 – 17 June 1960) was a Czechoslovak film actress. She appeared in 15 films between 1915 and 1953.

== Selected filmography ==
- The Magic House (1939)
- Auntie's Fantasies (1941)
- The Dancer (1943)
- Old Czech Legends (1953)
