= Zdeňka Baldová =

Czech actress

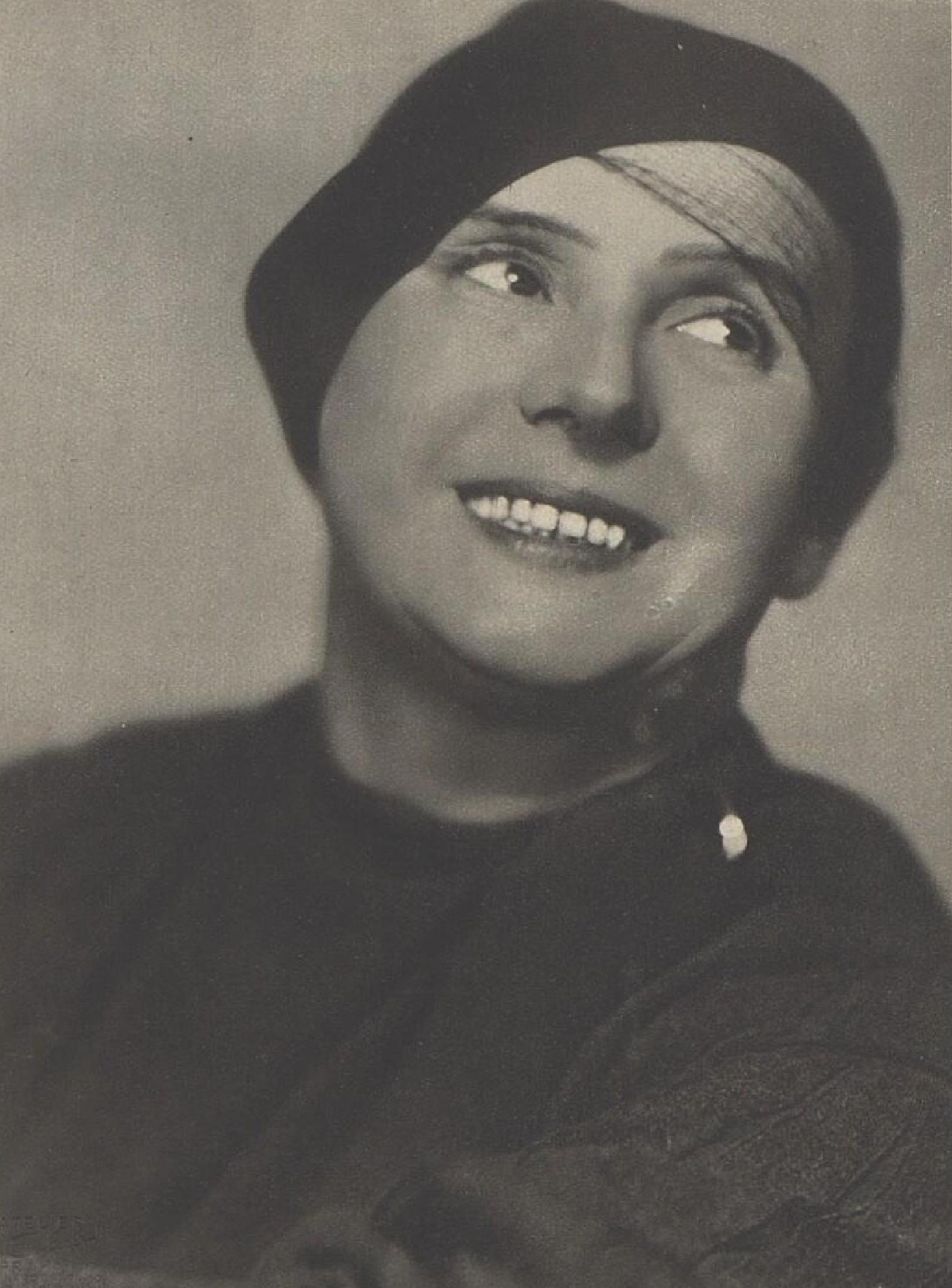
- Baldová in 1933
- Born: 20 February 1885; Česká Třebová, Bohemia, Austria-Hungary
- Died: 26 September 1958 (aged 73); Prague, Czechoslovakia
- Occupation: Actress
- Years active: 1921–1958

Signature
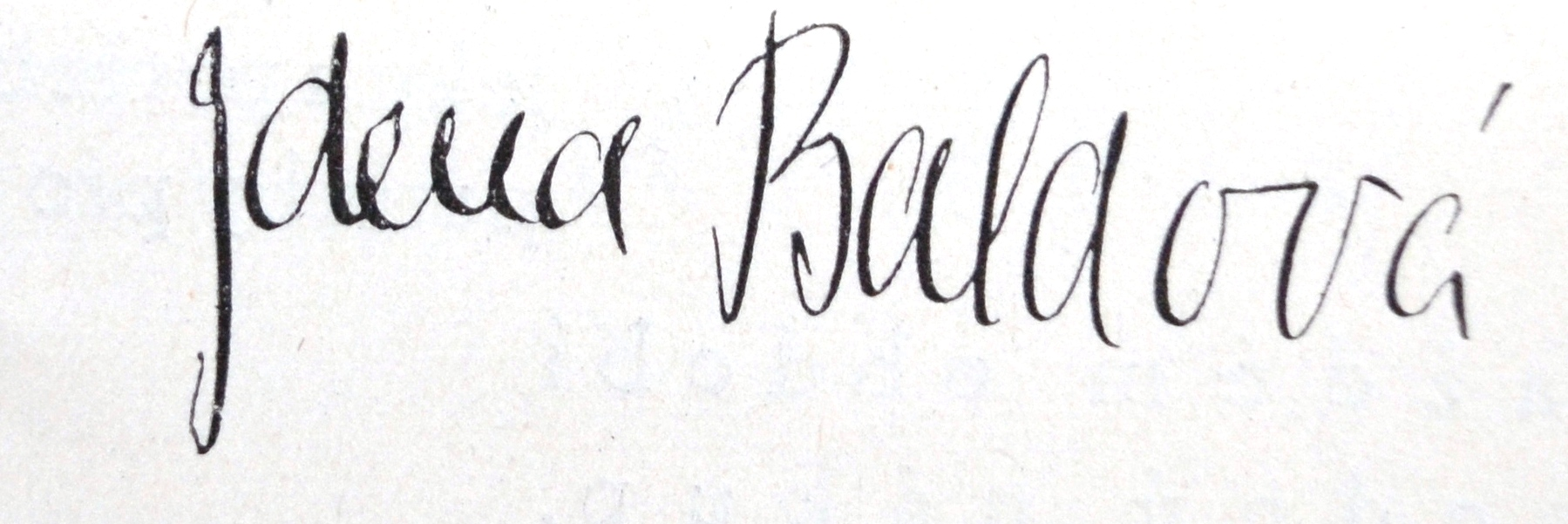

Zdeňka Baldová (born Zdeňka Balašová, married Hilarová; 20 February 1885 – 26 September 1958) was a Czech film actress. She appeared in more than 60 films between 1921 and 1958. Baldová is buried at the Vinohrady Cemetery.

== Selected filmography ==
- The Inspector General (1933)
- The Last Man (1934)
- Three Men in the Snow (1936)
- Morality Above All Else (1937)
- Lidé na kře (1937)
- Jiný vzduch (1939)
- Eva tropí hlouposti (1939)
- Arthur and Leontine (1940)
- Pacientka Dr. Hegla (1940)
- Auntie's Fantasies (1941)
- A Charming Man (1941)
- Valentin the Good (1942)
- Gabriela (1942)
- Rozina, the Love Child (1945)
- The Adventurous Bachelor (1946)
- Sign of the Anchor (1947)
- A Dead Man Among the Living (1949)
- Distant Journey (1949)
- Leave It to Me (1955)
- Focus, Please! (1956)
