= Ladislav Boháč =

Czech actor

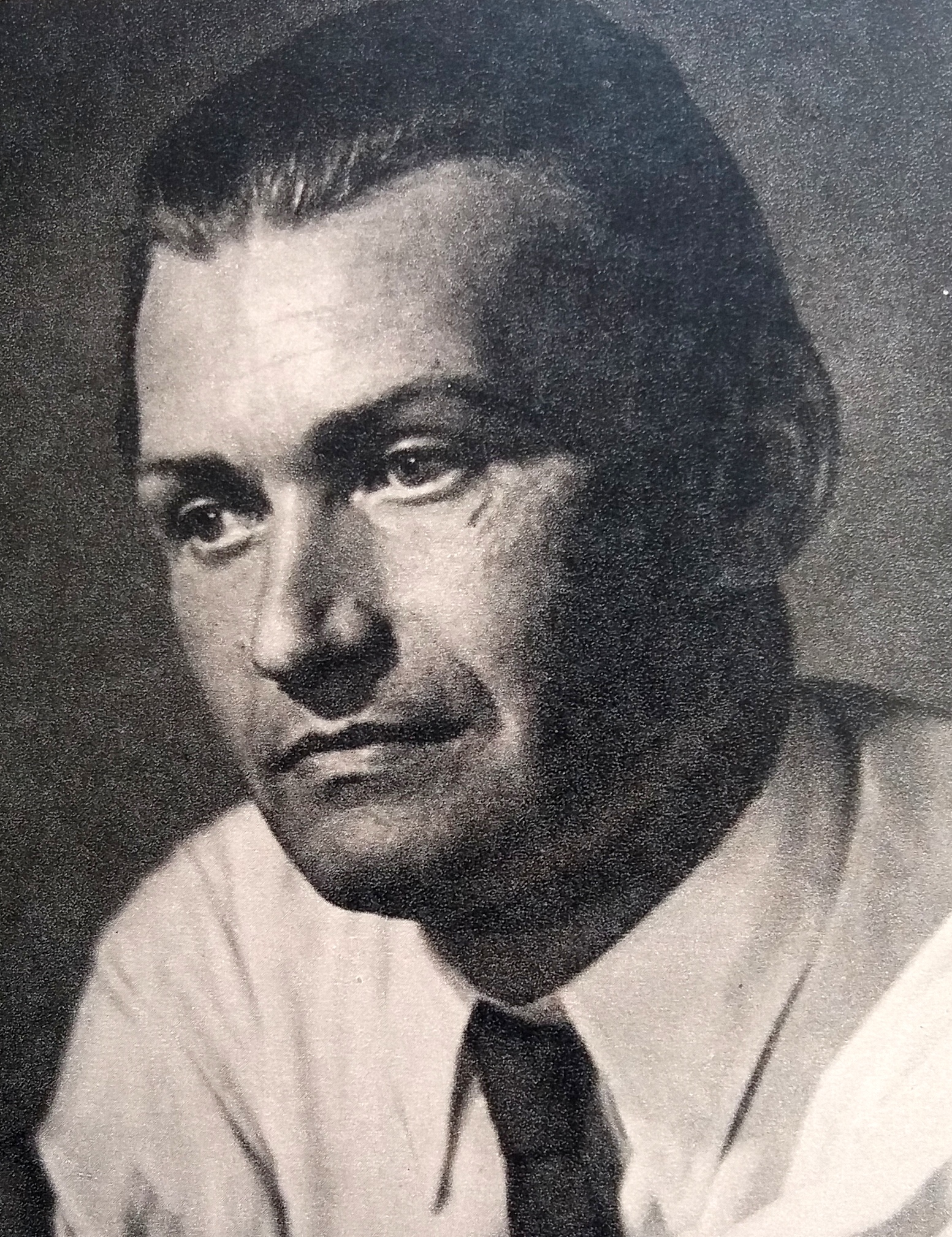
- Boháč in 1944
- Born: 14 April 1907; Uherský Brod, Moravia, Austria-Hungary
- Died: 4 July 1978 (aged 71); Prague, Czechoslovakia
- Occupation: Actor
- Years active: 1933–1977

Ladislav Boháč (14 April 1907 – 4 July 1978) was a Czech film actor and a theatre director. He appeared in more than 45 films between 1933 and 1977.

== Selected filmography ==
- Morality Above All Else (1937)
- Skeleton on Horseback (1937)
- Lidé na kře (1937)
- Virginity (1937)
- Filosofská historie (1937)
- Jiný vzduch (1939)
- Humoreska (1939)
- Second Tour (1940)
- Rozina, the Love Child (1945)
- Saturday (1945)
- The Heroes Are Silent (1946)
- Getting on in the World (1948)
- Temno (1950)
- The Great Opportunity (1950)
