= Jan W. Speerger =

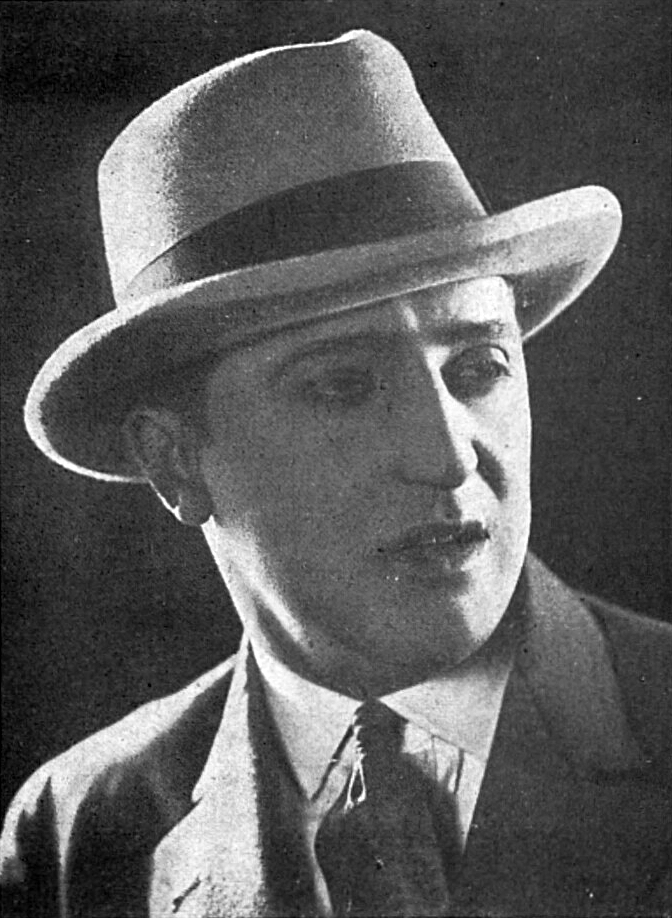
- Born: 29 April 1896; Adamov, Moravia, Austria-Hungary (now Czech Republic)
- Died: 25 June 1950 (aged 54); Prague, Czechoslovakia
- Occupations: Actor, film director
- Years active: 1915–1950

Jan Wenceslaus Speerger (29 April 1896 – 25 June 1950) was a Czech film actor and film director. He appeared in many Czech movies in the first half of the 20th century.

== Life ==
He started as a cinema projectionist and later worked as a technician and assistant director for Wetebfilm. He acted mostly in supporting roles and also directed three films. He was also a stage actor in Vinohrady Theatre, National Theatre and others.

== Selected filmography ==
=== Actor ===
- The Arrival from the Darkness (1921)
- The Cross by the Brook (1921)
- Jánošík (1921)
- White Paradise (1924)
- The Lantern (1925)
- The Eleventh Commandment (1925)
- Never the Twain (1926)
- St. Wenceslas (1929)
- Poor Girl (1929)
- All for Love (1930)
- Imperial and Royal Field Marshal (1930)
- Him and His Sister (1931)
- The Good Soldier Schweik (1931)
- Sister Angelika (1932)
- Anton Spelec, Sharp-Shooter (1932)
- The Undertaker (1932)
- The Ideal Schoolmaster (1932)
- The Inspector General (1933)
- The Heroic Captain Korkorán (1934)
- Jánošík (1935)
- Three Men in the Snow (1936)
- Irca's Romance (1936)
- Virginity (1937)
- Cause for Divorce (1937)
- Tři vejce do skla (1937)
- The Lantern (1938)
- Girl In Blue (1940)
- Baron Prášil (1940)
- Nocturnal Butterfly (1941)
- Valentin the Good (1942)
- I'll Be Right Over (1942)
- Řeka čaruje (1945)
- Rozina, the Love Child (1945)
- Thunder in the Hills (1946)
- Čapek's Tales (1947)
- The Poacher's Foster Daughter or Noble Millionaire (1949)
- Divá Bára (1949)

=== Director ===
- The Tramp's Heart (1922)
- Lost Souls (1926)
- Gypsy Love (1938)
