= The Good Soldier Schweik (1931 film) =

1931 film

- Directed by: Martin Frič
- Written by: Václav Wasserman; Jaroslav Hašek
- Starring: Saša Rašilov
- Cinematography: Jan Stallich
- Edited by: Martin Frič
- Release date: 1931
- Running time: 57 minutes
- Country: Czechoslovakia
- Language: Czech

The Good Soldier Schweik (Czech: Dobrý voják Švejk) is a 1931 Czechoslovak black-and-white comedy film directed by Martin Frič, based on Jaroslav Hašek's novel The Good Soldier Švejk.

== Cast ==
- Saša Rašilov as Josef Svejk
- Oscar Marion as Lieutenant Karel Lukás (as Oskar Marion)
- Jan Richter as Palivec, innkeeper
- Hugo Haas as MUDr. Katz
- Antonie Nedošinská as Mrs. Müllerová, landlady
- Josef Rovenský as MUDr. Grünstein
- Jaroslav Marvan as Plukovník Kraus
- Jarmila Vacková as Irena Krausová
- Alexander Třebovský as Bretschneider, secret agent
- Milka Balek-Brodská as Countess von Botzenheim
- Eduard Šlégl as Chamberlain
- Felix Kühne as Doctor
