= Václav Binovec =

Czech actor, director and scriptwriter

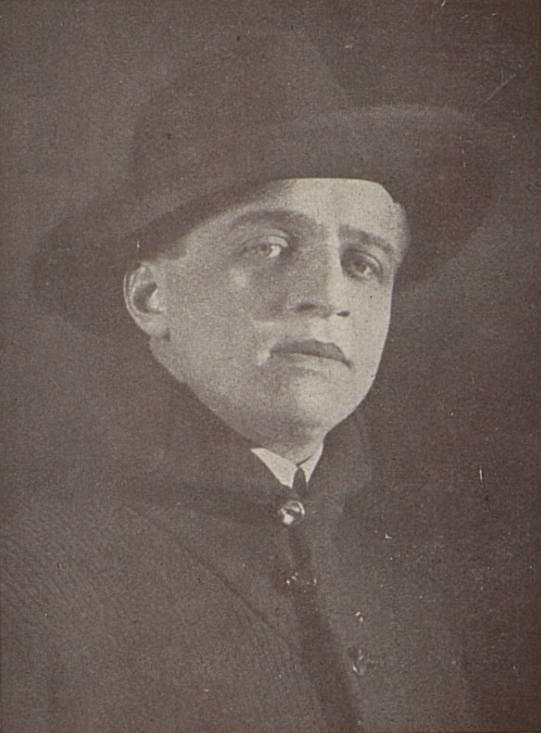
Václav Binovec in the 1920s

Václav Binovec (12 September 1892 – 29 February 1976, in Prague) was a Czech film director, screenwriter, and occasional actor. He was often referred to under the pseudonyms of Willy Bronx or W. Bronx, and also V. Vabin. Binovec set up the film company Wetebfilm in 1918, and began a career as a film director, launching the careers of actors such as Suzanne Marwille, Alois Sedláček and Jan W. Speerger. Among his notable earlier films are Krasavice Káťa (1919), For the Freedom of the Nation (Za svobodu národa) and Plameny života (1920) and Sivooký démon, Černí myslivci and Poslední radost (all 1921).

Subdued by the economic crisis in Czechoslovakia, Binovec commenced film production in Berlin in 1924, where he also launched a film rental business from 1926 until 1931. He was appointed the chairman of the Czechoslovak Film Union from 1933 until 1939, and held various other prominent positions in Czech film organizations. Many of his films of the 1930s were sentimental comedies or melodramas such as Pepina Rejholcová (1932), Žena, která ví, co chce (1934) and Polibek ve sněhu, and many of them were adaptions of literary works, such as František Langer's Jízdní hlídka (The Riding Patrol) (1936), the drama Poručík Alexandr Rjepkin (Lieutenant Alexander Rjepkin) (1937) and Jan Drda's novel Městečko na dlani (The Town on the Palm) (1942).

During World War II, Binovec conspired with the Nazis to arrest Karel Hašler, and after the end of World War II he was imprisoned for three years and stripped of his filmmaking rights. Only in later years did he work at the Czechoslovak Film Institute, before dying in Prague in 1976. Today he is considered to be one of the pioneers of the Czech film industry.

== Early life ==
Binovec was the first born son of a druggist who ran a pharmacy on Na Poříčí Street in Prague. He attended Karlín high school before briefly pursuing a course in pharmacy at Czech university. With a natural affinity for the arts and a talent for languages, Binovec abandoned his studies and travelled extensively, gaining experience of the film industry in Hollywood, Paris, Berlin, Madrid and Moscow in 1911–1912. He fought during World War I but was dismissed on medical grounds as an invalid.

== Career ==
In 1918, Binovec set up the film company Wetebfilm in an office at the studio of the sculptor Štrunc, and launched a career as a silent film director and screenwriter. He is accredited with launching the careers of actors such as Suzanne Marwille, Alois Sedláček and Jan W. Speerger. Many of his earlier films were adaptations of literary works by the likes of Alexander Pushkin with Krasavice Káťa in 1919, and Jakub Arbes with Sivooký démon, Růžena Svobodová with Černí myslivci and Knut Hamsun with Poslední radost, all in 1921. In 1920, Binovec made For the Freedom of the Nation (Za svobodu národa), a romantic war drama starring V. Ch. Vladimírov and Suzanne Marwille, which follows the exploits of a student who is drafted into the Austro-Hungarian army during World War I and switches allegiance to the Russians. Several leading Czech politicians of the period made cameo appearances as themselves in the film, including Karel Kramář. Films such as Plameny života (1920) and Děvče z Podskalí (1922) fared particularly well commercially. Binovec made four appearances as an actor in his silent films, including A vásen vítezí (1918), Sivooký démon (1919), Titimekuv náhrdelník (1920).

The economic crisis in Czechoslovakia curbed his filmmaking opportunities in his native country, forcing him to move to Berlin, where he set up a film school in 1924 and resumed with his production company Wetebfilm. From 1926 until 1931 he also ventured into the film rental business, establishing Lyrafilm. Binovec was the chairman of the Czechoslovak Film Union from 1933 until 1939, the vice-chairman of the Bohemian-Moravian Film Headquarters from 1939 to 1941 and held numerous other film organizational positions. Many of his films of the 1930s were sentimental comedies or melodramas such as Pepina Rejholcová (1932), Žena, která ví, co chce (1934) and Polibek ve sněhu. With the exception of his film adaptations of plays such as František Langer's Jízdní hlídka (The Riding Patrol) (1936), the drama Poručík Alexandr Rjepkin (Lieutenant Alexander Rjepkin) (1937) and Jan Drda's novel Městečko na dlani (The Town on the Palm) (1942), most of the 17 sound films he made were not of high quality. In 1940 he made Madla zpívá Evrope with singer-actress Zdenka Sulanová.

== World War II and later life ==
During World War II, Binovec collaborated with the Nazis, and was implicated with the arrest of Karel Hašler by the Gestapo, who later died in Mauthausen concentration camp. In 1945, Binovec was arrested and tried for war crimes between 1946 and 1948. Though sentenced to three years imprisonment, he was discharged on November 7, 1949 and subsequently worked as a driver under the scrutiny of the StB, living on the edge of poverty. He was forbidden to continue his career making films.

On July 24, 1966, Binovec emigrated to West Germany with his son Viktor, after claiming he was only leaving the country to visit a nephew. He had hoped to find work with Miloš Havel and J. A. Holman and work for Radio Free Europe, but his efforts proved fruitless. He later returned to his native Prague, and found work at the Czechoslovak Film Institute. He died in Prague in February 1976 at the age of 88. Today, Binovec is considered to be one of the pioneers of the Czech film industry.

== Personal life ==
Binovec had an affair with the actress Suzanne Marwille in the 1920s, and she gave birth to a daughter named Marta Fričová. In 1948, his son Viktor was born.

== Filmography ==
- Démon rodu Halkenu (1918)
- Osálená komtesa Zuzana (1918)
- A vásen vítezí (1918)
- Oklamaný hypnotisér Swengali (1919)
- Sivooký démon (1919)
- Bogra (1919)
- Evin hrích (1919)
- Titimekuv náhrdelník (1920)
- Krasavice Kata (1920)
- For the Freedom of the Nation (1920)
- Ircin románek I. (1921)
- Plameny zivota (1921)
- Román boxera (1921)
- Ircin románek II. (1921)
- Cerní myslivci (1921)
- Poslední radost (1922)
- Noc tríkrálová (1922)
- Marwille detektivem (1922)
- Adam a Eva (1922)
- Devce z Podskalí (1922)
- Láska slecny Very (1922)
- Die Gasse der Liebe und der Sünde (1923)
- Madame Golvery (1923)
- The Sun Disciples (1926)
- Irca v hnízdecku (1927)
- Nase jedenáctka (1930)
- Pepina Rejholcová (1932)
- A Woman Who Knows What She Wants (1934)
- Kiss in the Snow (1935)
- Holy Lie (1935)
- Jizdni hlidka (1936)
- Lieutenant Alexander Rjepkin (1937)
- Liza Soars to the Skies (1937)
- Ze vsech jediná (1938)
- Second Youth (1938)
- Jarka a Věra (1938)
- A Foolish Girl (1938)
- The Innocent Girl (1939)
- Lízino stestí (1939)
- Love Song (1940)
- Madla zpívá Evrope (1940)
- Dceruska k pohledáni (1940)
- Městečko na dlani (1942)
- Bludná pout (1945)
