= Battle of Nezbudská Lúčka =

1947 battle

- Part of Operation B (1947)
Date	19 August 1947
Location	Nezbudská Lúčka, Slovakia
Result	Czechoslovak victory

Belligerents
Czechoslovakia	Ukrainian Insurgent Army

Commanders and leaders
(Czechoslovakia) Miloslav Novotný †	Unknown

Strength
4 (later reinforced)	Unknown, but more than Czechoslovaks during initial phase

Casualties and losses
1 killed	Unknown

Battle of Nezbudská Lúčka was a clash in which a group of SNB members defended gamekeeper's lodge near Nezbudská Lúčka against larger forces of UPA. Eventually, reinforcements arrived for the defenders and the UPA retreated.

== Battle ==
In the evening of August 19, 1947, a four-member patrol of SNB members, led by Miloslav Novotný, were sent to guard the gamekeeper's lodge near the village of Nezbudská Lúčka. Late at night, the gamekeeper's lodge was surrounded by a large group of UPA members, whose task was to procure food for their unit. UPA members shouted and shot into the air, demanding that the residents of the lodge voluntarily give them food and guaranteed that they would not harm them. guard. Novotný shouted to the UPA members who were approaching the gamekeeper's lodge in a formation that the lodge was protected by a SNB unit and that if the Bandera men did not immediately leave the area, weapons would be used against them. Subsequently, the UPA members opened concentrated fire on the entire facility, including the use of grenades. The four rangers who had been stationed in the lodge returned their fire and the Bandera men were forced to withdraw from the immediate vicinity of the lodge. However, they continued to systematically surround and shell the lodge. They repeatedly repeated their calls for the defenders to surrender, hand over their weapons and that they would guarantee their lives. Novotný and the other defenders refused any further negotiations and kept the attacking Bandera men at bay by shooting. They assumed that they would hold the defence of the lodge until reinforcements arrived, which also happened after an hour. In this situation, Bandera's men evacuated their positions and managed to escape from the area in the darkness of the night. While defending the gamekeeper's lodge, a guard, Novotný, was killed, who was posthumously promoted to the rank of sergeant major. The remaining defenders used up almost all their ammunition during the battle and if reinforcements had not arrived in time, things would probably have turned out badly for the other defenders.

== See also ==
- Operation B (1945–1947)
- Battle of Partizánska Ľupča
