= Station Master (1941 film) =

Station Master Přednosta stanice
- Directed by: Jan Sviták
- Written by: Václav Wasserman; Nicolas Nancey (play Il est cocu, le chef de gare); André Mouëzy-Éon (play Il est cocu, le chef de gare)
- Starring: Vlasta Burian
- Release date: 1941
- Running time: 88 minutes
- Country: Czechoslovakia
- Language: Czech

Station Master (Original Czech-language title: Přednosta stanice) is a 1941 Czech language film, starring the then star comedian Vlasta Burian. It has a running time of 88 minutes and was directed by Jan Sviták.

== Plot ==
It deals with an unpaying passenger escaping the General Inspector of railroads after sleeping in his special wagon. He is then by circumstances forced to adopt the persona of master of the local railroad station. He then is forced to act at this duty before the General Inspector, committing a number of blunders due to his lack of experience and knowledge of railroad administration.

The plot also involves the absent real railroad master's wife being constantly eyed by the General Inspector, as well as a local landowner.

The movie ends with the real railroad master returning and the General inspector being scorned for his courting of the man's wife by Burian.

== Cast ==
The movie starred Vlasta Burian in the main role, Jaroslav Marvan as the General inspector. The other actors are Čeněk Šlégl, Růžena Šlemrová, Václav Trégl, Theodor Pištěk Sr, Marie Norrová, Darja Hajská, František Černý, Karel Postranecký, J. Hradčanský, Bolek Prchal, Emanuel Kovařík, Ada Dohnal, Lída Borovcová, Zdeněk Martínek, Míla Svoboda, Karel Veverka, Dalibor Pták, Vojta Merten, Alois Dvorský, F. X. Mlejnek, Václav Švec, Antonín Zacpal and Zita Kabátová.
