= Father Vojtech =

Father Vojtech may refer to:

- Father Vojtech (1929 film), a 1929 Czech film directed by Martin Frič
- Father Vojtech (1936 film), a 1936 Czech film also directed by Martin Frič
