= Operation B =

Operation B may refer to

- Battle of Borneo (1941–1942) - Military campaign by Japanese Imperial forces for control of Borneo island
- Operation B (1945–1947) - Czechoslovak military operation aimed against Ukrainian Insurgent Army.
  - Operation B (film) - 1951 film inspired by the operation.
- Operation B (Poland) – 1950 arrest of clergymen
- Operation B (1952–1953) - centrally organized forced resettlement of people inconvenient to Czechoslovak communists from large cities to the countryside, often to ruins in the borderlands, unfit for housing.
- Operation B (1953) - plan for the abolition of all Catholic women's orders and congregations, the mandatory dissolution of religious communities and the transition of nuns to civilian employment prepared by the communist regime in Czechoslovakia in 1953.
