= Saša Rašilov =

Czech actor

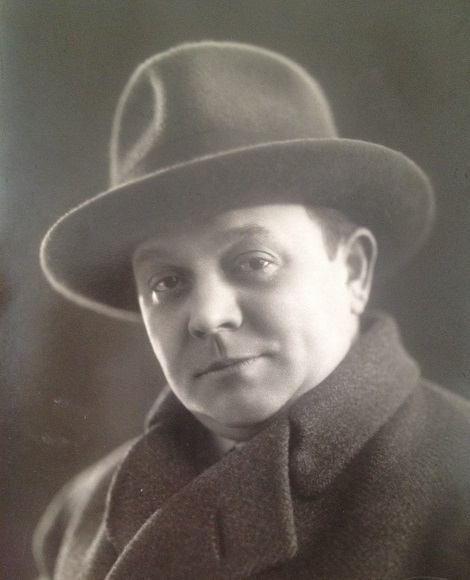
- Rašilov before 1935
- Born: 6 September 1891; Prague, Bohemia, Austria-Hungary
- Died: 4 May 1955 (aged 63); Prague, Czechoslovakia
- Occupation: Actor
- Years active: 1913–1954
- Relatives: Saša Rašilov (grandson)

Saša Rašilov (6 September 1891 – 4 May 1955) was a Czech film actor. He appeared in 30 films between 1913 and 1954.

Rašilov was an actor, comedian, clown and cabaret, grandfather of actor Saša Rašilov Jr. and his brother Vaclav Rašilov, and a longtime member of the drama of the National Theatre in Prague.

== Life and career ==
Saša Rašilov was born in Prague, Bohemia, Austria-Hungary (now the Czech Republic) on 6 September 1891. He came from impoverished aristocratic family. His father, who was the administrator of the noble casinos in Celetná Street, died suddenly in 1901, when Rašilov was ten years old. Only three of twelve siblings of children had survived. The oldest of the sons was a cellist in the orchestra of the German Theatre in Brno, and so Rašilov and her mother moved to Brno. Soon they returned to Prague and lived in Prague's suburb of Zizkov. His mother died in 1909. In 1909 Rašilov trained as a typist and from 1909 to 1914 he worked in Prague.

After his return to Prague, he started performing in various Prague cabarets (Variety Karlin, Rococo, Longenův Boom Cabaret and Stage and Revolutionary Red Seven). In 1920 he was seen by Karel Hugo Hilar in the title role of Molière play The Lord of Prasátkov, adapted by Eduard Bass and directed by Jiří Dréman. Rašilov briefly moved into cabaret Bang, but where were several other prominent comics (Vlasta Burian, Ferenc Futurista, Eman Fiala, Josef Rovenský and Karel Noll) cabaret and a half year after the operation ceased due to scheduling conflicts in the file. But back in 1921 at the behest of the then new head of drama Karel Hugo Hilar, Rašilov came to test and from 1 September 1921, he became a full member of the drama set the National Theatre in Prague, where he worked almost until his death in 1955.

From performing in a cabaret actors took a lot of practical experience, including the ability to improvise and make contact with the audience. He had a remarkable ability to individually transform classical stage roles according to their temperament and outlook, which eventually made him very popular.

Even at the time of the adoption of the National Theatre in antique helped free Emil Berner in Prague and later he became a collector of antiques. After returning from the war he lived in Old Town Iron doors, and later bought a houseboat, where he lived for several years and who kept the anchor Podoli or Žofín opposite the National Theatre. The cruise on the Vltava River took Zbraslav and decided to buy a house here. To get money, began to actively engage the film. In the Czech film industry he began working even before World War I in 1913, in the pioneering days of the Czech silent film.

== Selected filmography ==
- The Last Bohemian (1931)
- Morality Above All Else (1937)
- Andula Won (1937)
- I'll Be Right Over (1942)
- Rozina, the Love Child (1945)
- The Adventurous Bachelor (1946)
