= Guard 13 =

1946 film

- Directed by: Martin Frič
- Written by: Eduard Fiker; Karel Steklý
- Starring: Dana Medřická
- Cinematography: Jan Stallich
- Edited by: Jan Kohout
- Release date: 8 March 1946
- Running time: 95 minutes
- Country: Czechoslovakia
- Language: Czech

Guard 13 (Czech: 13. revír) is a 1946 Czech crime film directed by Martin Frič.

== Cast ==
- Dana Medřická as Frantiska Brabcová aka Fróny
- Jaroslav Marvan as Inspektor Cadek
- Ella Nollová as Matka Klouzanda, hospodská
- Vilém Pfeiffer as MUDr. Karel Chrudimský
- Nora Cífková as Hlavsová, snoubenka Chrudimského
- Miloš Nedbal as Komisar Dr. Barák
- Blanka Waleská as Wang - Liová
- Jaroslav Sára as Wang-li, cínský podomní obchodník
- Ladislav H. Struna as Karta, kasar
- Alois Dvorský as Hlas kartova otce
- Vladimír Repa as Draboch, detektiv
- Otto Rubík as Pobozný, detektiv
- Vladimír Leraus as Docent patologie
- Vladimír Hlavatý as Jindra, císník
- Anna Gabrielová as Prostitute
