= Král komiků =

Czech comedy film

Král komiků is a Czech comedy film starring Vlasta Burian. It was released in 1963.
