= Rudolf Deyl =

Rudolf Deyl may refer to:

- Rudolf Deyl Sr. (1876–1972), Czech actor
- Rudolf Deyl Jr. (1912–1967), Czech actor, his son
