= For the Freedom of the Nation =

1920 film directed by Václav Binovec

- Film poster
- Czech: Za svobodu národa
- Directed by: Václav Binovec
- Written by: Václav Binovec
- Starring: V. Ch. Vladimírov; Suzanne Marwille
- Cinematography: Jindrich Brichta; Otto Heller; Svatopluk Innemann; Alois Jalovec; Václav Münzberger
- Release date: 28 October 1920
- Country: Czechoslovakia
- Language: Silent

For the Freedom of the Nation (Czech: Za svobodu národa) is a 1920 Czechoslovak romantic war drama film directed by Václav Binovec. The film, set during World War I, stars V. Ch. Vladimírov and Suzanne Marwille. Several leading Czech politicians of the period made cameo appearances as themselves in the film, including Karel Kramář. The film premiered on 28 October 1920.

== Plot ==
After the announcement of conscription in 1914, student Jiří Voldán is drafted into the Austro-Hungarian army to fight against Russia. He switches allegiance to the Russians and is wounded in battle. While recovering at a hospital in Kiev he meets the Slovak nurse Maryša, who has fled from the Hungarian authorities, and they fall in love. He recovers and joins the Czechoslovak legions. He fights in Italy and France before being arrested by the Austrians and is sentenced to death, but is freed by friends.

== Cast ==
- V. Ch. Vladimírov as Jirí Voldán
- Suzanne Marwille as Maryša
- Evzen Georgij Jevgenev as 1st Lieutenant Szabo
- Marie Ptáková as Jirí's Mother
- Václav Vydra as von Bühren
- Ladislav H. Struna as Misko
- Jan W. Speerger as Miner / Jan Hus
- Václav Kubásek as Kubík
- Zanka as a Russian commandant
- Alois Tichý as a volunteer
- Václav Zatíranda as a volunteer
- Frantisek Marek as a volunteer
- Jaroslav Svára as a volunteer
- Karel Votruba as a volunteer
- Václav Rapp as a volunteer

== Release and reception ==
The film premiered on October 28, 1920. The author Adolf Branald describes the film as "a patriotic montage about the legionnaires' struggles for freedom", stating that the director was particularly fond of the script and the romance that develops between the characters of Voldán and Maryša. Gian Piero Brunetta cites the film as one of the notable films of the era documenting the Czech experience of World War I, including Rudolf Mesták's Legionář (Legionnaire) (1920), Antonín Vojtěchovský's Jménem jeho Veličenstva (In the Name of His Majesty) (1928), and Svatopluk Innemann's Plukovník Svec (Colonel Svec) (1930). The film was described as being an "authentic" one. One Czech film history book notes a scene in which several prominent historic Czech figures appear before the soldiers on Christmas Day, including Jan Hus and Jan Žižka. Another publication notes a scene in which a Jewish housekeeper from Halič is crucified.
