= Čapek's Tales =

1947 Czechoslovak drama film

- Directed by: Martin Frič
- Written by: (Karel Čapek original book); Martin Frič; František Vlček; Jaroslav Zák
- Starring: Jaroslav Průcha
- Cinematography: Jan Roth
- Edited by: Jan Kohout
- Release date: 19 September 1947
- Running time: 106 minutes
- Country: Czechoslovakia
- Language: Czech

Čapek's Tales (Czech: Čapkovy povídky) is a 1947 Czechoslovak drama film directed by Martin Frič, based on 5 short detective stories by Karel Čapek. It was nominated for the Grand International Award at the Venice Film Festival, 1947.

== Cast ==
- Jaroslav Průcha as Zedník Zaruba
- Jaroslav Marvan as Bartosek, Police Superintendent and narrator
- Lída Chválová as Paní Landová
- František Kovařík as Juraj Cup
- Vladimír Šmeral as Ferdinand Kugler
- František Smolík as Starec, witness
- František Filipovský as Police Agent Pistora
- Paľo Bielik as Police Chief Havelka
- Theodor Pištěk as Karel Hampl
- Antonie Nedošinská as Mary
- Gustav Hilmar as Senate President
