= His Majesty's Adjutant =

1933 film

- Directed by: Martin Frič
- Written by: Hans Burger; Walter Taub; Václav Wasserman
- Starring: Vlasta Burian
- Cinematography: Otto Heller
- Release date: 1933
- Running time: 70 minutes
- Country: Czechoslovakia
- Language: German

His Majesty's Adjutant (German: Der Adjutant seiner Hoheit) is a Czechoslovak comedy film directed by Martin Frič. It was released in 1933.

== Cast ==
- Vlasta Burian - Adjutant Patera
- Gretl Theimer - Pepi Kalasch
- Werner Fuetterer - Prinz Eugen
- Anni Markart - Prinzessin Anna Luise
- Hans Götz - Oberleutnant Kinzel
- Emmy Carpentier - Bardame
- Josef Vaverka
- Else Lord - Chansonière
- Leo Dudek - Fiakerhälter (as Leopold Dudek)
- Otto Ströhlin - Mader
