= Operation B (film) =

1952 film

- Directed by: Josef Mach
- Written by: Eduard Fiker (novel); Martin Fric
- Starring: Antonie Hegerlíková; Vlasta Chramostová; Josef Bek
- Cinematography: Julius Vegricht
- Edited by: Antonín Zelenka
- Music by: Jirí Srnka
- Production company: Ceskoslovenský Státní Film
- Distributed by: Ceskoslovenský Státní Film
- Release date: 22 February 1952
- Running time: 90 minutes
- Country: Czechoslovakia
- Language: Czech

Operation B (Czech: Akce B) is a 1952 Czech war drama film directed by Josef Mach and starring Antonie Hegerlíková, Vlasta Chramostová and Josef Bek. It was shot at the Barrandov Studios in Prague. The film's sets were designed by the art director Miroslav Pelc. It is set during Operation B, a military operation conducted by the Czechoslovak Army against the Ukrainian Insurgent Army in the aftermath of the Second World War.

== Cast ==
- Antonie Hegerlíková as Mária
- Vlasta Chramostová as Ofélie
- Josef Bek as Capt. Synek
- Mirko Čech as Lieutenant
- Josef Chvalina as Fenda
- Rudolf Deyl as Lt. Málek
- Frantisek Holar as Gocen
- Miloslav Holub as Boluk
- Mikulás Huba as Police major
- Stanislav Langer as Monsignore
- Oldrich Lukes as Police warrant officer
- Jaroslav Mares as Juzek
- Dana Medrická as Polana
- Karel Richter as LCpl. Venda
- Jozef Sikuta as Farár
- Bohumil Smutný as Lt. Rychta
- Jirí Sovák as Pvt. Jula
- Antonín Sura as Pvt. Láda
- Martin Tapák as Pvt. Ondra
- Milos Vavruska as Cpl. Tonda

== Bibliography ==
- Černík, Jan. Český technický scénář 1945–1962. Palacký University Olomouc, 2021.
- Wohl, Eugen & Păcurar, Elena. Language of the Revolution: The Discourse of Anti-Communist Movements in the "Eastern Bloc" Countries: Case Studies. Springer Nature, 2023.
