= Warning (1946 film) =

1946 film

- Directed by: Martin Frič; Paľo Bielik
- Written by: Martin Frič
- Starring: Paľo Bielik
- Cinematography: Karol Krska
- Release date: 1946
- Running time: 85 minutes
- Country: Slovakia
- Language: Slovak

Warning (Slovak: Varúj...!) is a 1946 Slovak drama film directed by Martin Frič and Paľo Bielik.

== Cast ==
- Paľo Bielik as Ondrej Muranica
- Július Pántik as Miso
- Andrej Bagar
- Mikulás Huba as Ing. Gregor
- Ondrej Jariabek
- Frantisek Zvarík
