= Experiment (1943 film) =

1943 film

- Directed by: Martin Frič
- Written by: Karel Matěj Čapek-Chod; Karel Steklý
- Produced by: Vaclav Drazl
- Starring: Zdeněk Štěpánek
- Cinematography: Jan Roth
- Edited by: Jan Kohout
- Release date: 3 September 1943
- Running time: 104 minutes
- Country: Czechoslovakia
- Language: Czech

Experiment is a 1943 Czech drama film directed by Martin Frič.

== Storyline ==
A doctor and a painter meet by chance in a mountain hut. Many years ago, they had both witnessed a young girl commit suicide. It is only now that they learn what led to the girl ending her life.

== Cast ==
- Zdeněk Štěpánek as MUDr. Svatopluk Slaba
- Vlasta Matulová as Julka Zachová
- Vítezslav Vejrazka as Slaba's Nephew Jindrich
- Otomar Korbelář as Painter Karel Chodovský
- Ella Nollová as Holovská
- Anna Hlavácková-Vávrová as MUDr. Dunovská
- Marie Blazková as Slaba's Housekeeper
- Vera Hanslíková as Jindrich's lover
- Marie Buresová as Singer
- Olga Augustová as Singing-Mistress
- Vladimír Repa as Guest at the Vernissage
- František Filipovský as Guest at the Vernissage
- Bolek Prchal as Servant in Slaba's sanatorium
