= Pancho se žení =

Pancho se zení
- Directed by: Rudolf Hrušínský; František Salzer
- Written by: Rudolf Hrušínský
- Starring: Rudolf Hrušínský; Vlasta Matulová
- Cinematography: Ferdinand Pečenka
- Music by: Jiří Srnka
- Release date: 27 September 1946
- Running time: 1h 28min
- Country: Czechoslovakia
- Language: Czech

Pancho se žení is a 1946 Czechoslovak film.

== Cast ==
- Rudolf Hrušínský – Pancho
- Vlasta Matulová – Rosita
- Jindřich Plachta – Francisco Fernando Rodriguez, Rosita's father
