= Andrej Bagar =

Slovak actor

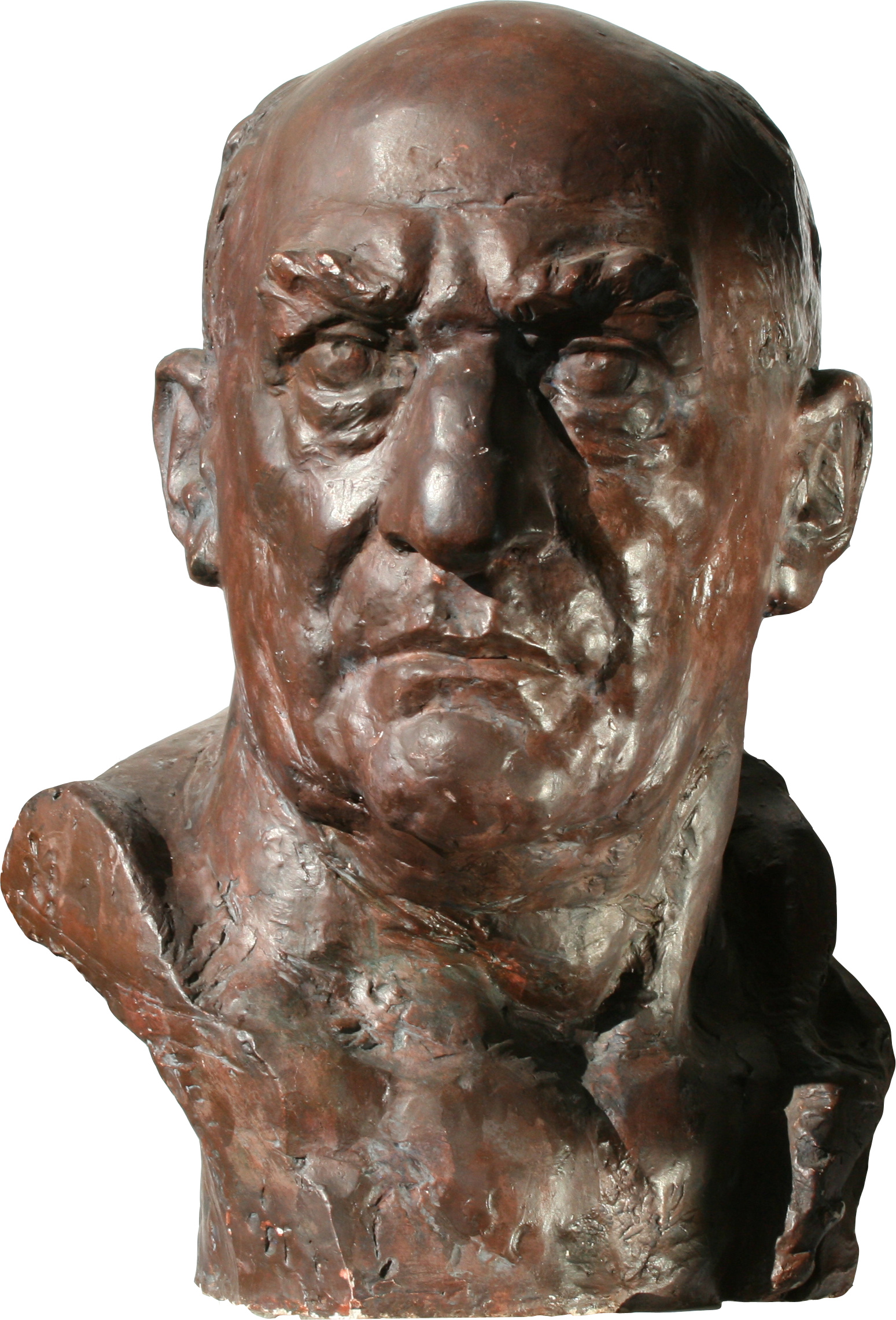
- portrait bust, by Emil Venkov
- Born: 29 October 1900; Trencsénteplic, Austria-Hungary (now Slovak Republic)
- Died: 31 July 1966 (aged 65); Bratislava, Czechoslovakia (now Slovak Republic)
- Occupation: Actor
- Years active: 1935–1965

Andrej Bagar (29 October 1900 – 31 July 1966) was a Slovak film and theatre actor and theatre director. He appeared in 16 films between 1935 and 1965. Nitra's theatre, previously known as Krajové divadlo Nitra, took his name, becoming the Andrej Bagar Theatre in 1979.

== Selected filmography ==
- Jánošík (1935)
- Warning (1946)
- The Struggle Will End Tomorrow (1951)
