= Dana Medřická =

Czechoslovak actress

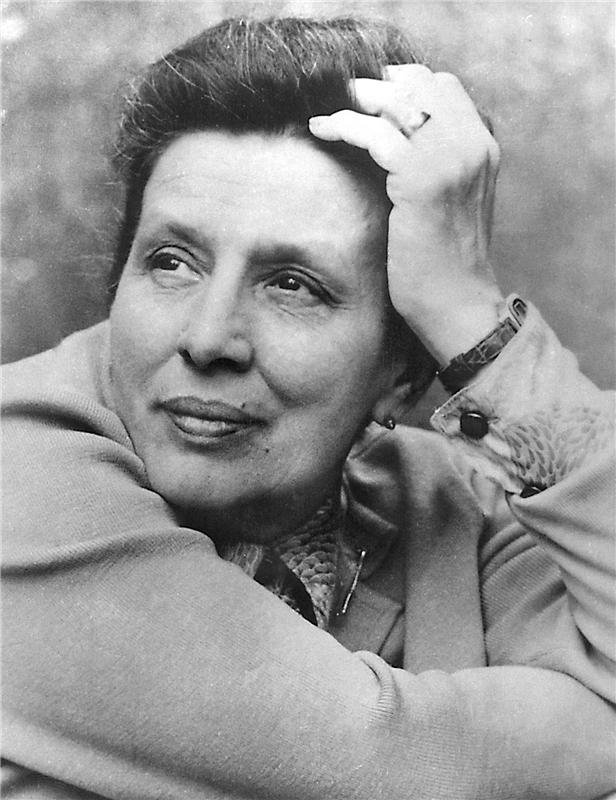
- Born: 11 July 1920; Prague, Czechoslovakia (now Czech Republic)
- Died: 21 January 1983 (aged 62); Prague, Czechoslovakia (now Czech Republic)
- Occupation: Actress
- Years active: 1944-1983

Dana Medřická (11 July 1920 – 21 January 1983) was a Czech film actress. She appeared in more than 60 films between 1944 and 1983.

== Selected filmography ==
- Černí myslivci (1945)
- Guard 13 (1946)
- The Avalanche (1946)
- Getting on in the World (1948)
- White Darkness (1948)
- Operation B (1952)
- Ošklivá slečna český film 1959 (1959)
- Lidé z maringotek (1966)
- Who Wants to Kill Jessie? (1966)
- Day for My Love (1976)
- The Tailor from Ulm (1978)
- Day of the Idiots (1981)
