= Ducháček Will Fix It =

- Directed by: Karel Lamač
- Written by: Rudolf Bernauer (play Konto X); Rudolf Österreicher (play Konto X); Václav Wasserman
- Starring: Vlasta Burian
- Cinematography: Otto Heller
- Edited by: Ervín Drexler
- Release date: 3 June 1938
- Running time: 87 minutes

Duchacek Will Fix It (Czech: Ducháček to zařídí) is a Czech comedy film directed by Karel Lamač. It was released in 1938.

The film is a remake of the German comedy The Office Manager (1931).

== Cast ==
- Vlasta Burian - Jan Damián Ducháček
- Ladislav Hemmer - Dr. Jiří Faukner - advokát
- Adina Mandlová - Julie z Rispaldic
- Milada Gampeová - Alžběta z Rispaldic
- Čeněk Šlégl - Quido Krystofovic - korvetní kapitán
- Karel Máj - Ervín z Rispaldic
- Václav Trégl - Jan Rabas
- Marie Blažková - Brigita Rabasová
- Theodor Pištěk - Ignác Zámoský - bankéř
- Jiřina Sedláčková - Helena Bertrandová
- Jaroslav Marvan - Baron Kurt Bertrand, advokát
- Karel Postranecký - Vilém - komorník
- Karel Němec - Dudek - kastelán
- Ferdinand Jarkovský - Kolomazník - koncipient
- Milka Balek-Brodská - Faukner's Secretary
