= Adamov (České Budějovice District) =

- Municipality
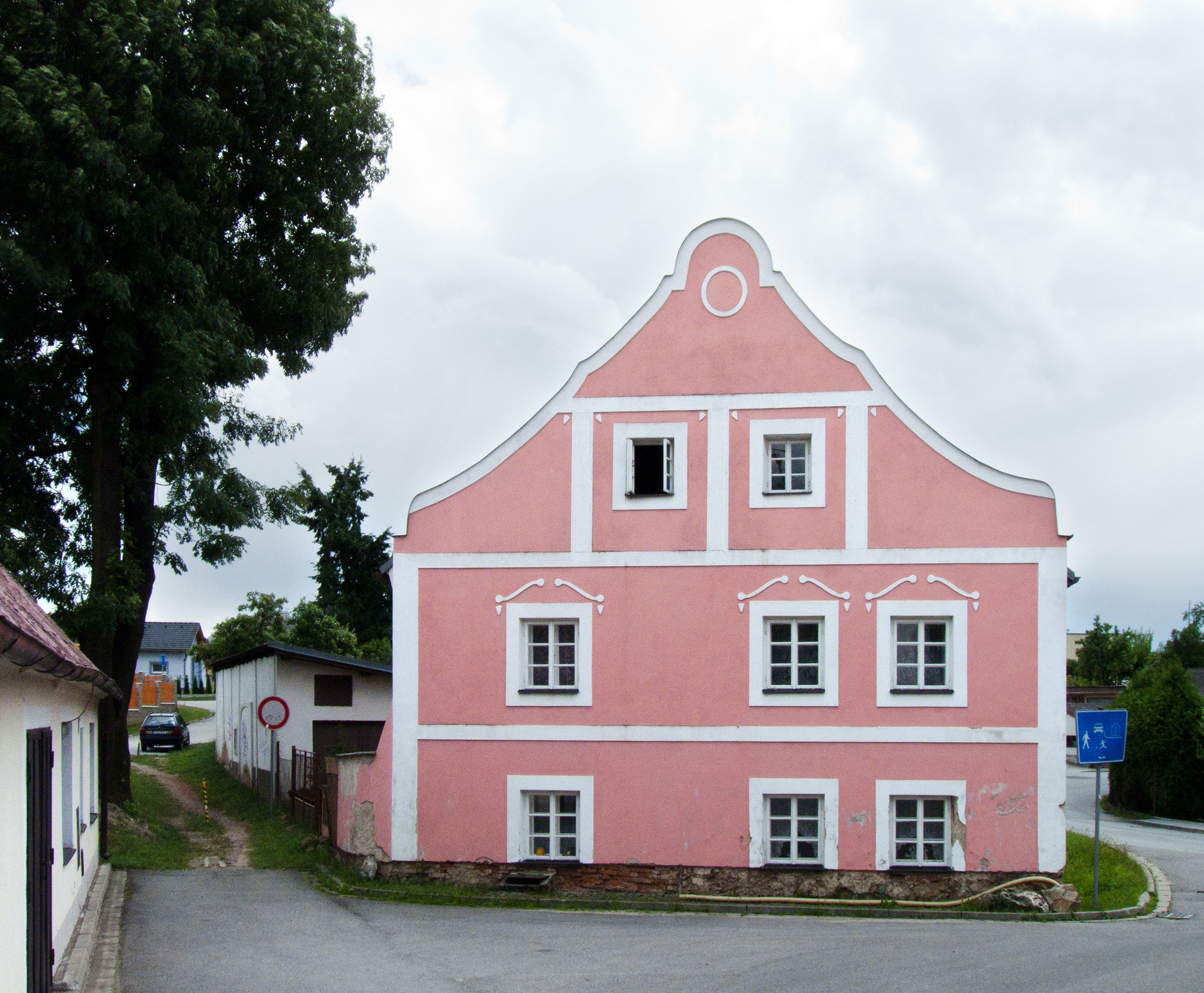
- Former town hall

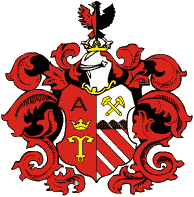
- Flag Coat of arms

- Location in the Czech Republic
- Coordinates: 49°0′2″N 14°32′22″E
- Country: Czech Republic
- Region: South Bohemian
- District: České Budějovice
- Founded: 1550

Area
  - Total: 1.03 km^{2} (0.40 sq mi)
- Elevation: 478 m (1,568 ft)

Population (2026-01-01)
  - Total: 1,025
  - Density: 995/km^{2} (2,580/sq mi)
- Time zone: UTC+1 (CET)
  - Summer (DST): UTC+2 (CEST)
- Postal code: 373 71
- Website: www.adamovcb.eu

Adamov (German: Adamstadt) is a municipality and village in České Budějovice District in the South Bohemian Region of the Czech Republic. It has about 1,000 inhabitants.

== Etymology ==
The initial name of the settlement was Ungnadovské Hory, meaning "Ungnad's mountains". It was named after the nobleman Ondřej Ungnad of Sunek, who owned the estate. The current name Adamov (meaning "Adam's") was given in honour of Adam Ungnad, who arranged for the promotion to mining town.

== Geography ==
Adamov is located about 5 kilometres (3 mi) east of České Budějovice. It is urbanistically fused with Rudolfov in the south and Hůry in the north. The municipality lies in the Třeboň Basin. The highest point is at 579 m (1,900 ft) above sea level.

== History ==
Adamov was initially a mining community, founded in 1547–1550. It was founded within the Hluboká estate, probably in the area of the extinct medieval village of Příhořany, first mentioned in 1378. There were silver and lead ore mines near the settlement. In 1595, the settlement was promoted to mining town by Emperor Rudolf II.

== Demographics ==
Historical population

| Year | Pop. | ±% |
|---|---|---|
| 1869 | 637 | — |
| 1880 | 682 | +7.1% |
| 1890 | 707 | +3.7% |
| 1900 | 650 | −8.1% |
| 1910 | 735 | +13.1% |

| Year | Pop. | ±% |
|---|---|---|
| 1921 | 650 | −11.6% |
| 1930 | 632 | −2.8% |
| 1950 | 437 | −30.9% |
| 1961 | 441 | +0.9% |
| 1970 | 406 | −7.9% |

| Year | Pop. | ±% |
|---|---|---|
| 1980 | 387 | −4.7% |
| 1991 | 489 | +26.4% |
| 2001 | 515 | +5.3% |
| 2011 | 627 | +21.7% |
| 2021 | 997 | +59.0% |

Source: Censuses

== Transport ==
The I/34 road (the section from České Budějovice to Jindřichův Hradec, part of the European route E551 and shortly also part of the European route E49) runs north of the village.

== Sights ==
The main landmark of Adamov is the former town hall. The building dates probably from the 16th century. Today it has a Neoclassical façade.

== Notable people ==
- Jan W. Speerger (1896–1950), actor and film director
