= Sister Angelika =

1932 film

- Directed by: Martin Frič
- Written by: Václav Wasserman
- Starring: Suzanne Marwille
- Cinematography: Karl Degl
- Release date: 1932
- Country: Czechoslovakia
- Language: Czech

Sister Angelika (Czech: Sestra Angelika) is a 1932 Czech drama film directed by Martin Frič.

== Cast ==
- Suzanne Marwille as Karla Richtrová-Sister Angelika, dancer
- Hugo Haas as Pavel Ryant
- Theodor Pistek as Prison's director
- Josef Rovenský
- Marta Trojanová
- Jan W. Speerger
- Josef Klapuch
- Robert Ford
- Frantisek V. Kucera
- Josef Sládek
- Sasa Razov
