= The Undertaker (1932 film) =

1932 film

- Directed by: Karel Lamač
- Written by: Václav Wasserman; Vlasta Burian
- Produced by: Ladislav Kolda
- Starring: Vlasta Burian
- Edited by: Antonín Zelenka
- Release date: 1932
- Running time: 90 minutes
- Country: Czechoslovakia
- Language: Czech

The Undertaker (Czech: Funebrák) is a Czech comedy film directed by Karel Lamač. It was released in 1932.

== Cast ==
- Vlasta Burian - Pleticha
- Josef Rovenský - Boleslav Hnipírdo
- Betty Kysilková - Frantiska Plicová
- Růžena Šlemrová - Anna Plicová
- Jan Sviták - Franz, her beau
- Václav Menger - The Uncle
- Jan Richter - The Railway Inspector
- Martin Frič - The Inspector's Clerk
- Theodor Pištěk - Mr. Klapka
- Viktor Nejedlý - Mr. Lux
- Radola Renský - The Boy
- Milka Balek-Brodská - The Sister-in-law, his mother
- Dalibor Ptak - The Pianist
- Lída Baarová - Miss Rozmarová
