= Jaroslav Blažek =

Czech cinematographer

- Born: 3 August 1896; Prague, Austria-Hungary
- Died: 9 August 1976 (aged 80); Prague, Czechoslovakia
- Occupation: Cinematographer
- Years active: 1919–1943 (film)

Jaroslav Blažek (3 August 1896 – 9 August 1976) was a Czech cinematographer. He worked in the Czech film industry from the silent era to the German occupation. He also shot a 1940 comedy film Then We'll Get a Divorce at the Palatino Studios in Rome.

== Selected filmography ==
- Madame Golvery (1923)
- Battalion (1927)
- The Organist at St. Vitus' Cathedral (1929)
- The Last Man (1934)
- U nás v Kocourkově (1934)
- Na Svatém Kopečku (1934)
- Vzdušné torpédo 48 (1937)
- Hordubalové (1937)
- Then We'll Get a Divorce (1940)
- Second Tour (1940)
- The Hard Life of an Adventurer (1941)

== Bibliography ==
- Cowie, Peter. A Concise History of the Cinema: Before 1940. A. Zwemmer, 1971. p. 156.
