= The Organist at St. Vitus' Cathedral =

1929 film

- Directed by: Martin Frič
- Written by: Martin Frič; Václav Wasserman; Vítezslav Nezval
- Produced by: Vladimír Stránský
- Starring: Karel Hašler
- Cinematography: Jaroslav Blažek
- Distributed by: Lloydfilm
- Release date: 30 August 1929
- Running time: 80 minutes
- Country: Czechoslovakia
- Language: Silent

The Organist at St. Vitus' Cathedral (Czech: Varhaník u sv. Víta) is a 1929 silent Czech drama film directed by Martin Frič.

== Production ==
The movie was shot at Kavalírka film studio. Exterior scenes were shot on location at Prague Castle. Frič was inspired by Billy Bitzer's The Love Flower. In the middle of filming a producer Vladimír Stránský went bankrupt and committed suicide.

== Cast ==
- Karel Hašler as Organist
- Oscar Marion as Ivan, painter (as Oskar Marion)
- Suzanne Marwille as Klára, foster-child
- Ladislav H. Struna as Josef Falk, extortionist
- Otto Zahrádka as Klára's father
- Marie Ptáková as Abbess
- Vladimír Smíchovský as Innkeeper
- Josef Kobík as Fish vendor
- Milka Balek-Brodská as Maiden
- Roza Schlesingerová as Women in the Cathedral
- Václav Wasserman as New organist
