= Andrej Bagar Theatre =

Theatre in Nitra, Slovakia

- Divadlo Andreja Bagara
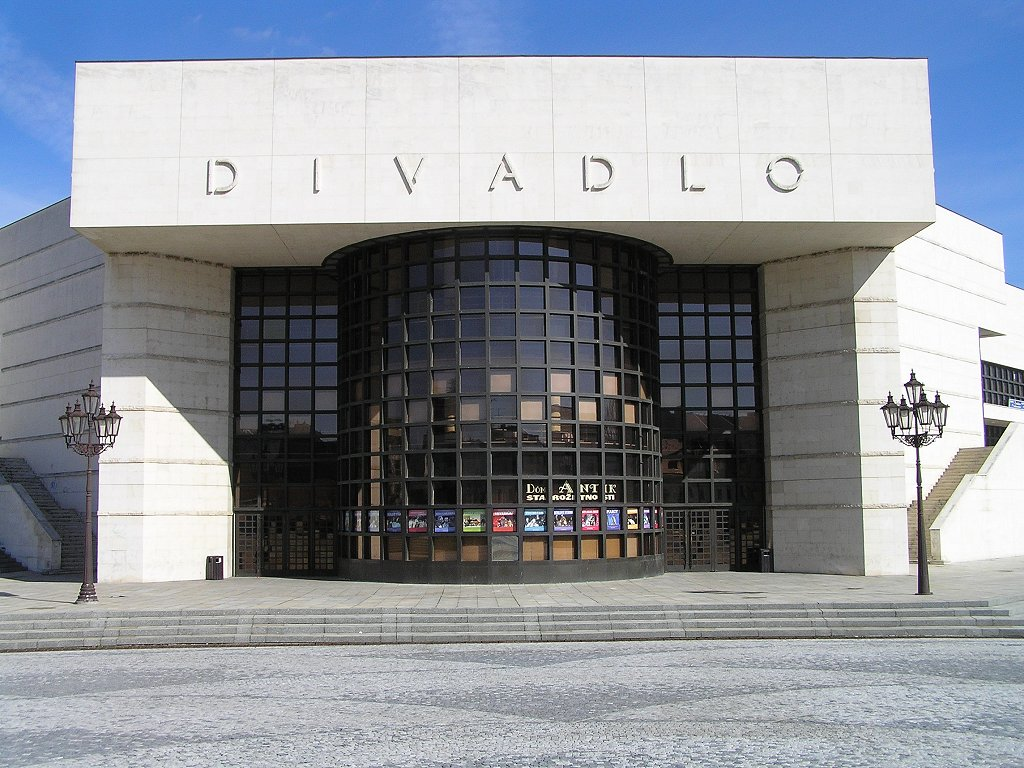
- Interactive map of Andrej Bagar Theatre
- Former names: Nitrianske krajové divadlo Krajové divadlo Nitra
- Address: Svätoplukovo nám. 4
- Location: Nitra
- Coordinates: 48°18′51″N 18°5′20″E
- Type: theatre
- Public transit: Divadlo Andreja Bagara

Construction
- Opened: 1949

Website
- www.dab.sk

The Andrej Bagar Theatre (Slovak: Divadlo Andreja Bagara) is a theatre located in Nitra, Slovakia. It opened in 1949. The theatre was known as Nitrianske krajové divadlo (Nitra Region Theatre) and Krajové divadlo Nitra (Regional Theatre Nitra) before being named after actor Andrej Bagar in 1979. Various productions from the theatre have been recognised in the annual DOSKY Awards. The director of the theatre from 2001 was Ján Greššo, until being succeeded by Jaroslav Dóczy in 2016.
