= Morality Above All Else =

- Directed by: Martin Frič
- Written by: Martin Frič; Hugo Haas; Otakar Vávra
- Starring: Hugo Haas
- Cinematography: Ferdinand Pečenka
- Edited by: Jan Kohout
- Release date: 1937
- Running time: 75 minutes
- Country: Czechoslovakia
- Language: Czech

Morality Above All Else (Czech: Mravnost nade vše) is a Czech comedy film directed by Martin Frič. It was released in 1937.

== Cast ==
- Hugo Haas as Prof. Antonín Karas
- Světla Svozilová as Karolína Karasová
- Adina Mandlová as Eva Karasová
- Ladislav Boháč as MUDr. Jílkovský
- Saša Rašilov as JUDr. Mach
- Věra Ferbasová as Vera Gregorova
- Zdeňka Baldová as Drázná
