= Vlasta Matulová =

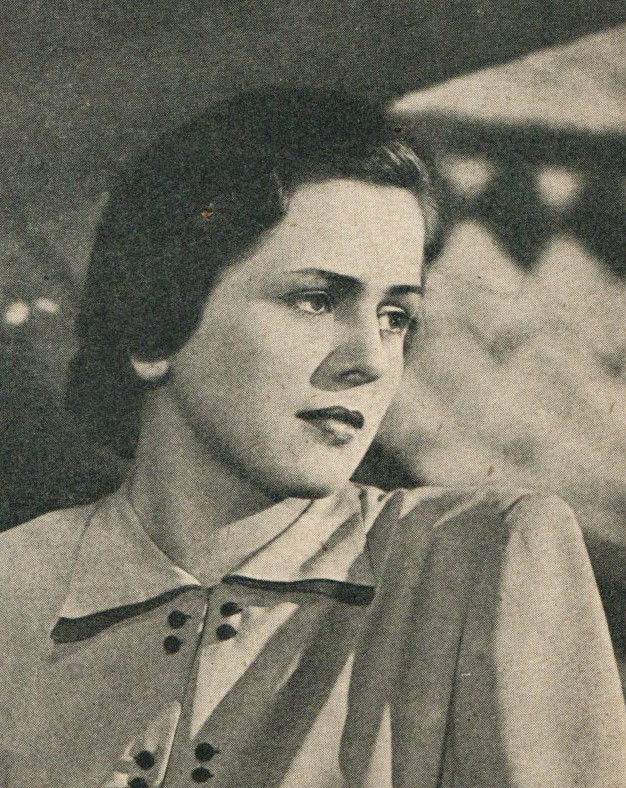
- Vlasta Matulová in 1942
- Born: 31 October 1918; Brno, Czechoslovakia
- Died: 18 April 1989 (aged 70); Prague, Czechoslovakia
- Occupation: Actress
- Years active: 1940–1977

Vlasta Matulová (31 October 1918 – 18 April 1989) was a Czech actress. She appeared in more than twenty films from 1940 to 1977.

== Selected filmography ==
Year	Title	Role	Notes
1940	Ladies in Waiting		
1942	I'll Be Right Over		
1943	Experiment		
1946	The Adventurous Bachelor		
1946	Pancho se žení		
1954	Jan Hus		
1955	Jan Žižka		
1956	Against All		
1964	Hvězda zvaná Pelyněk		
