= The Catacombs (film) =

1940 Czech comedy film directed by Martin Frič

- Directed by: Martin Frič
- Written by: Václav Wasserman; Gustav Davis
- Produced by: Antonín Procházka
- Starring: Vlasta Burian
- Cinematography: Václav Hanus
- Edited by: Jan Kohout
- Production company: UFA
- Distributed by: UFA
- Release date: 23 February 1940
- Running time: 89 minutes
- Countries: Bohemia and Moravia
- Language: Czech

The Catacombs (Czech: Katakomby) is a 1940 Czech comedy film directed by Martin Frič. It was released on 23 February, 1940.

== Cast ==
- Vlasta Burian as Borman, oficiál
- Jaroslav Marvan as Sýkora, prednosta úradu
- Čeněk Šlégl as Krystof, reditel Pozemkového úradu
- Theodor Pištěk as Klásek, prezidiální
- Adina Mandlová as Nasta Borková
- Antonín Novotný as Dr. Marek, úredník
- Raoul Schránil as Ing. Jirí Rudík
- Nataša Gollová as Irena Krystofová
- Růžena Šlemrová as Malvína Klásková
- Miloš Nedbal as Kefurt, vrchní revident
- Bohuš Záhorský as Hlinka, revident
- Kocourkov Teachers, Borman's colleagues singing
