= U pokladny stál... =

1939 Czechoslovak comedy film

- Directed by: Karel Lamač
- Starring: Vlasta Burian; Jaroslav Marvan; Adina Mandlová
- Release date: 1939
- Running time: 99 minutes
- Country: Czechoslovakia
- Language: Czech

U pokladny stál... is a Czechoslovak comedy film. It was released in 1939. The cast included Vlasta Burian, Jaroslav Marvan, Adina Mandlová, Čeněk Šlégl, Marie Blažková, Václav Trégl, Ladislav Hemmer, Karel Postranecký, and František Filipovský.
