= Madame Golvery =

1923 film

- Directed by: Václav Binovec
- Written by: Otakar Storch-Marien
- Starring: Suzanne Marwille
- Cinematography: Jaroslav Blazek; Josef Kokeisl
- Production company: Weteb
- Distributed by: Iris Film
- Release date: 5 October 1923
- Country: Czechoslovakia
- Languages: Silent; Czech intertitles

Madame Golvery is a 1923 Czech silent film directed by Václav Binovec and starring Suzanne Marwille, V. Ch. Vladimírov and Hugo Svoboda.

The film's art direction was by Fritz Kraenke and Bohuslav Šula.

== Cast ==
- Suzanne Marwille as Zina Golveryová
- V. Ch. Vladimírov as Petr Vladimír
- Hugo Svoboda as Zarozin
- J. Rubek as Prince Alexander Teveklov
- A. Palenová as Xenie Martanová
- Paul Rehkopf as Petr Bertram
- Alois Sedlácek
- Else Engel
- Willy Kaiser-Heyl
- Hermann Böttcher

== Bibliography ==
- Jean Mitry. Histoire du cinéma: 1915-1925. Éditions universitaires, 1995.
