= Čestmír Řanda =

Czech actor (1923–1986)

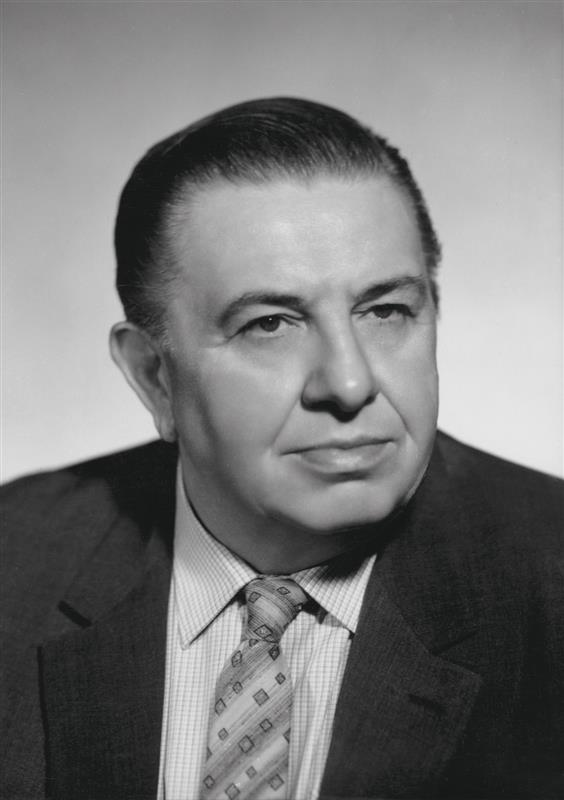
- Born: 5 December 1923; Rokycany, Czechoslovakia
- Died: 31 August 1986 (aged 62); Prague, Czechoslovakia
- Occupation: Actor
- Years active: 1960–1986

Čestmír Řanda (5 December 1923 – 31 August 1986) was a Czech film actor. He appeared in over 65 films and television shows between 1960 and 1986.

== Selected filmography ==
- Bílá spona (1960)
- Hvězda zvaná Pelyněk (1964)
- Lidé z maringotek (1966)
- Přísně tajné premiéry (1967)
- Nejlepší ženská mého života (1968)
- Witchhammer (1970)
- How to Drown Dr. Mracek, the Lawyer (1974)
- Zaklęte rewiry (1975)
- Což takhle dát si špenát (1977)
