= Two Children =

1924 film

- Directed by: Richard Clement Hilber
- Written by: Wilhelm Thiele
- Starring: Alexander Murski; Olga Belajeff; Suzanne Marwille
- Cinematography: Curt Courant
- Production company: Leo-Film
- Distributed by: Leo-Film
- Release date: 13 November 1924
- Country: Germany
- Languages: Silent; German intertitles

Two Children (German: Zwei Kinder) is a 1924 German silent film directed by Richard Clement Hilber and starring Alexander Murski, Olga Belajeff and Suzanne Marwille.

The film's sets were designed by the art director Karl Machus.

== Cast ==
- Alexander Murski as Knut Alsen
- Olga Belajeff as Margarete, Alsens Frau
- Suzanne Marwille as Emilie Thorhild
- Fritz Greiner as Niels, Chorist
- Luise Hohorst as Sophie, die Nachbarin
- Hans Schweikart as Peter Ovestad
- Clementine Plessner
- Rudolf Basil as Dr. Ralph Krüger, Haralds Erzieher
- Loni Nest as Christa Alsen
- Waldemar Potier as Harald

== Bibliography ==
- Bock, Hans-Michael & Bergfelder, Tim. The Concise CineGraph. Encyclopedia of German Cinema. Berghahn Books, 2009.
