= Paľo Bielik =

Slovak actor and film director (1910–1983)

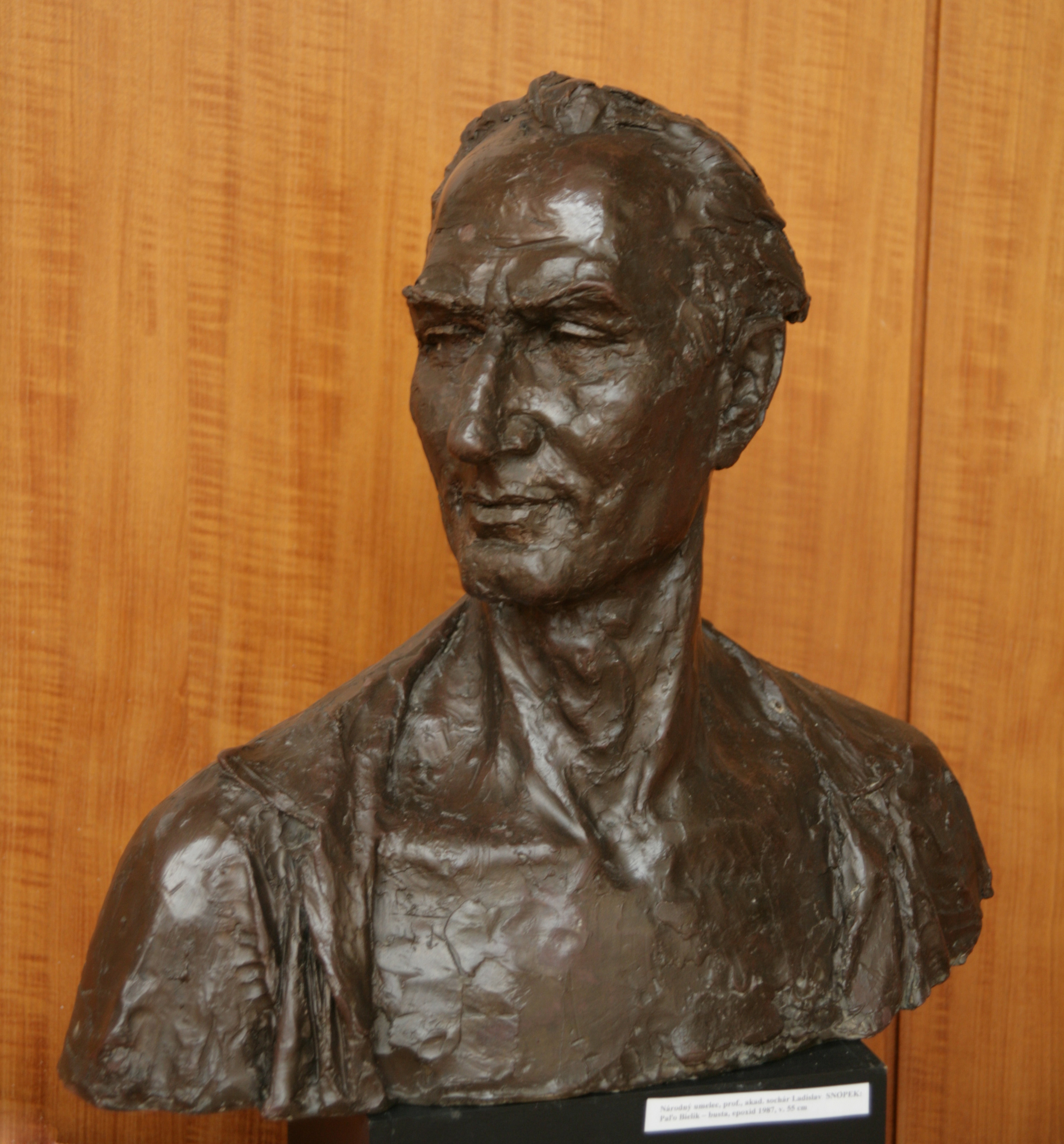
- Bust of Paľo Bielik by Ladislav Snopek
- Born: Ján Bukva; December 11, 1910; Banská Bystrica, Austria-Hungary
- Died: April 23, 1983 (aged 72); Prague, Czechoslovakia
- Occupations: Actor, Screenwriter, Film director
- Spouse: Marta Černická-Bieliková

Paľo Bielik (December 11, 1910 – April 23, 1983), also known as Ján Bukva, was a Slovak film director, screenwriter and actor. He was one of many notable personalities in the beginnings of Slovak cinematography.

== Life ==
He was born in Banská Bystrica, then part of Austria-Hungary. At the start he played amateur theatre in Banská Bystrica. In the role of Jánošík, the eponymous play by Jiří Mahen, Karol Plicka noticed him and recommended him for the title role in the film Jánošík (1935) to Martin Frič. It was the second film of the legendary story about the famous highwayman. The success of the film led Bielik to a professional theatrical career in the Slovak National Theatre (1939–1941). During the war, he began to deal with short films and in 1945 he became a director of feature films. After his debut he starred in several other films of this important director (Hordubalové, Čapkove poviedky). During the filming of the movie directed by Frič, which was the first ever movie produced in Slovakia, Varúj!, Bielik was his co-director and also played one of the main characters. During the war Paľo Bielik began shooting short films, and later devoted himself to the creation of successful full-length films. Along with Karol Krško he filmed a documentary film For Freedom, in which footage of the Slovak National Uprising was used.

Bielik worked with authentic material on his first feature film, Vlčie diery, made in 1948. The Czechoslovak Army and guerrillas assisted him in creating the film. In the film played a team of excellent actors like Ladislav Chudík, Jozef Budský, Francis Dibarbora, Martin Ťapák and many others. To the theme of war, Paľo Bielik returned in the movie Štyridsaťštyri, made in 1957. As an award of this movie he received a special honorable mention and the FIPRESCI Prize at the 11th Karlovy Vary International Film Festival in 1958. In 1959 he made the legendary film Captain Dabač, in the main role with Ladislav Chudík. In the sixties, Paľo Bielik revived Jánošík in the third film version, which is the jewel of Slovak cinematography. The movie was filmed in 1962 and 1963 on the occasion of the 250th anniversary of Jánošík's death. The last movies of Paľo Bielik as a movie director were the dramatic stories of Master Executioner (1966) and Three witnesses (1968). The films of the Slovak actor and director were mostly ballad stories of strong, vibrant characters, who mostly ended fatally.

== Personal life ==
Bielik was married to the theatre and film actress Marta (née Černická). Marta Černická-Bieliková was born on 19 May 1920 in Hodruša. She graduated from the Academy of Performing Arts in Bratislava. She died on 7 February 2002 in Bratislava.

== Awards ==
- 1958 FIPRESCI Prize for film Forty-four (11 IFF Karlovy Vary)
- 1968 title of national artist

== Filmography ==
- 1947 Čapek's Tales (1947)
- 1947 warns ...! (Andrew Muranica)
- 1935 Jánošík (Juraj Jánošík)

Directed by

- 1943 Synthetic fibers
- 1943 The health worker
- 1943 Under the open sky
- 1945 For Freedom
- 1946 Cormorant Island
- 1947 warns ...!
- 1948 Vlčie holes
- 1950 reservoir
- 1952 Lazy are moved
- 1954 Friday the thirteenth
- 1957 Forty-four
- 1959 Captain Dabač
- 1962 - 1963 Jánošík
- 1966 Master Executioner
- 1968 Three witnesses

scenario

- 1966 Master Executioner
- 1963 Jánošík
- 1957 Forty-four
- 1948 Vlčie holes
