= Second Tour (1940 film) =

1940 film

- Directed by: Martin Frič
- Written by: Jan Drda; Karel Baroch; Karel Steklý; Vilém Werner
- Produced by: Jan Sinnreich
- Starring: Zdeněk Štěpánek
- Cinematography: Jaroslav Blazek
- Edited by: Jan Kohout
- Release date: 20 December 1940
- Running time: 80 minutes
- Country: Czechoslovakia
- Language: Czech

Second Tour (Czech: Druhá směna) is a 1940 Czech drama film directed by Martin Frič.

== Cast ==
- Zdeněk Štěpánek as Engr. Jiri Gregor
- Vlasta Fabianová as Marie Gregorova
- Karel Benísko
- Vítezslav Bocek
- Ladislav Boháč as Engr. Petr Lukas
- Karel Cerný as Dr. Vaclavik
- Karel Dostal as Senate Chairman
- Alois Dvorský as Josef Skoula
- Eman Fiala as Obeslo
- Jarmila Holmová as Lawyer's Secretary
- František Kreuzmann as Judge
- Ladislav Kulhánek as Doctor
