= People on Wheels =

1966 film

- Film poster
- Directed by: Martin Frič
- Written by: Eduard Bass; Antonín Máša; Martin Frič
- Produced by: Ladislav Terš
- Starring: Jozef Króner; Jan Tříska; Emília Vášáryová
- Cinematography: Jan Stallich
- Edited by: Jan Kohout
- Music by: Zdeněk Liška
- Distributed by: Ústřední půjčovna filmů
- Release date: 23 December 1966
- Running time: 87 minutes
- Country: Czechoslovakia
- Language: Czech

People on Wheels (Czech: Lidé z maringotek), also translated as Trailer People, is a 1966 Czech drama film directed by Martin Frič.

== Cast ==
- Vlastimil Brodský as Beznohý
- Slávka Budínová as Marie
- Josef Hlinomaz as Congr
- Jozef Króner as Clown
- Dana Medřická as Gruzínka
- Ilja Prachar as Reimann
- Čestmír Řanda as Director
- Jaroslav Rozsíval as Ferdinand
- Martin Růžek as Lotys
- Jiřina Štěpničková as Zanda
- Jan Tříska as Acrobat Vincek
- Emília Vášáryová as Nina
- Josef Vetrovec as Vencl
