= Hordubalové =

- Directed by: Martin Frič
- Written by: Karel Čapek; Karel Hašler
- Produced by: Antonín Vlach
- Starring: Jaroslav Vojta
- Cinematography: Jaroslav Blazek
- Edited by: Zdenek Gina Hasler
- Release date: 1937
- Running time: 95 minutes
- Country: Czechoslovakia
- Language: Czech

Hordubalové is a Czech drama film directed by Martin Frič. It was released in 1937. It was based on the novel Hordubal by Karel Čapek.

== Cast ==
- Jaroslav Vojta - Juraj Hordubal
- Suzanne Marwille - Polana Hordubalová
- Paľo Bielik - Michal Hordubal
- Mirko Eliáš - Stepán Manya
- Vlasta Součková - Maryna Hordubalová
- Eliška Kuchařová - Hafie Hordubalová
- František Kovařík - Míso - Chief shepherd
- Filip Davidik - Filípek
- Gustav Hilmar - Gelnaj
- Vilém Pfeiffer - Karel Biegel
- Vladimír Majer - Gejza Fedeles
- Alois Dvorský - MUDr. Václav Klenka
