= Valentin the Good =

1942 film

- Directed by: Martin Frič
- Written by: Martin Fric; Josef Hlavác; Karel Steklý
- Starring: Lilly Hodácová
- Edited by: Jan Kohout
- Release date: 1942
- Running time: 100 minutes
- Country: Czechoslovakia
- Language: Czech

Valentin the Good (Czech: Valentin Dobrotivý) is a 1942 Czech comedy film directed by Martin Frič.

== Cast ==
- Lilly Hodácová as Julie Kahounová
- Oldřich Nový as Valentin Plavec
- Hana Vítová as Helena Bártová
- Theodor Pištěk as Kudrna, Valentin's uncle
- Mila Spazierova-Hezka as Singer in Sakura
- Zdeňka Baldová as Maruska Kudrnová
- Eman Fiala as Eman Voborník
- Milada Gampeová as Helen's mother
- Ladislav Pešek as Rudolf Brejsovec
- Josef Belský as Manager of Sakura
- Jaroslav Marvan as Bures
- Anna Letenská
