= All for Love (1930 film) =

1930 film

- Directed by: Martin Frič
- Written by: Martin Frič; František Klika
- Starring: Suzanne Marwille; František Klika; Jan W. Speerger
- Cinematography: Roman Miškevyč
- Production company: Terra Film
- Distributed by: Terra Film
- Release date: 23 October 1930
- Running time: 78 minutes
- Country: Czechoslovakia
- Language: Silent

All for Love (Czech: Vše pro lásku) is a 1930 Czech silent comedy film directed by Martin Frič and starring Suzanne Marwille, František Klika and Jan W. Speerger. It was shot at the Barrandov Studios in Prague and on location around Brno.

== Synopsis ==
While coming to visit her family in the countryside near Brno, the wealthy Vera attracts the interest of an engineer despite the fact he is engaged to another woman.

== Cast ==
- Valentin Šindler as Matej Krópal from Brochovany
- Suzanne Marwille as Věra
- František Klika as Douglas Odkolek
- Marie Běhavá as Mother from Douglas
- Jan W. Speerger as Ing. Peters
- Marie Pavlíková as Krópalová
- Olga Zvachová as Olga

== Bibliography ==
- Balski, Grzegorz. Directory of Eastern European Film-makers and Films 1945-1991. Flicks Books, 1992.
