= Bílá spona =

1960 film

- Directed by: Martin Frič
- Written by: Martin Frič
- Starring: Čestmír Řanda
- Cinematography: Jan Roth
- Edited by: Jan Kohout
- Release date: 1960
- Running time: 74 minutes
- Country: Czechoslovakia
- Language: Czech

Bílá spona is a 1960 Czech crime film written and directed by Martin Frič. starring Čestmír Řanda, Jarmila Smejkalová, Jan Pohan.

== Cast ==
- Čestmír Řanda as Capt. Chládek
- Jarmila Smejkalová as Horáková
- Jan Pohan as Lt. Janda
- Milan Holubár as Lt. Burda
- Václav Tomsovský as Pavel
- Ludmila Bednárová as Lída
- Radoslav Brzobohatý as Nekola
- Lubomír Kostelka as Wiesner
- Blazena Kramesová as Vlasta Ziková
- Ilona Kubásková as Bláhová
- Marta Kucerová as Singer
- Pavla Marsálková as Jandová
- Oldřich Nový as Horák
- Nina Popelíková as Táflová
- Josef Príhoda as Cleaning Shop Employee
- Bohumil Svarc as Stejskal
