= Hvězda zvaná Pelyněk =

1964 film

- Directed by: Martin Frič
- Written by: Martin Frič
- Starring: Jiřina Bohdalová
- Cinematography: Jaroslav Tuzar
- Edited by: Jan Kohout
- Release date: 1964
- Running time: 84 minutes
- Country: Czechoslovakia
- Language: Czech

Hvězda zvaná Pelyněk (English: The Star Called Wormwood) is a 1964 Czech drama film written and directed by Martin Frič. It depicts the events of 1918 mutiny of Czech soldiers serving in the Austro-Hungarian army in Rumburk garrison.

== Cast ==
- Jiřina Bohdalová as Tonka
- Radoslav Brzobohatý as Vodička
- Rudolf Deyl as Noha
- Jaroslav Mareš as Werner
- Vlasta Matulová as Hilda
- Míla Myslíková as Emka
- Čestmír Řanda as Klozberg
- Martin Růžek as Koval
- Jiří Sovák as Červenka
- Zdeněk Štěpánek as General
- Jan Tříska as Lojzík
- Josef Větrovec as Pelnar
