= Jánošík (1935 film) =

1935 film

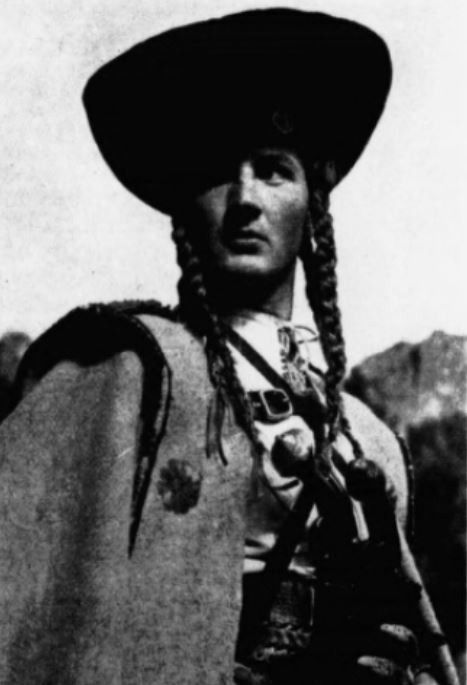
- Paľo Bielik in the title role of Jánoších
- Directed by: Martin Frič
- Written by: Jirí Mahen; Martin Frič
- Produced by: Karel Hašler
- Starring: Paľo Bielik
- Cinematography: Ferdinand Pečenka
- Release date: 1935
- Running time: 73 minutes
- Country: Czechoslovakia
- Language: slovak

Jánošík is a 1935 Czechoslovak drama film directed by Martin Frič.

== Cast ==
- Paľo Bielik as Juraj Jánošík
- Zlata Hajdúková as Anka
- Andrej Bagar as Master Sándor
- Theodor Pištěk as Count Andre Markušovský
- Filip Davidik as Janíčko, shepherd boy
- Kudo Bachlet as A Jánošík "Brigand"
- Mirko Eliás as A Jánošík "Brigand"
- Martin Hollý as A Jánošík "Brigand"
- Jindřich Plachta as A Jánošík "Brigand"
- Jan W. Speerger as A Jánošík "Brigand"
- Ladislav H. Struna as A Jánošík "Brigand"
- Jan Sviták as A Jánošík "Brigand"
- Kudo Uhlar as A Jánošík "Brigand"
- Otto Zahrádka as A Jánošík "Brigand"

== Reception ==
Writing for The Spectator in 1936, Graham Greene gave the film a poor review. Noting that the theme of robbing the rich to give to the poor "should retain its appeal until the Millennium", Greene found that the "romantic rollicking tuneful" beginning jarred sharply with the film's conclusion which sees the robber's "cruel death, hung like butcher meat with a spike in his ribs". As Greene sardonically observes, "Romance and robber tunes and lyrical shots of a long-legged Fairbanks hero don't go with the spike."
