= The Poacher's Foster Daughter or Noble Millionaire =

- Czech poster
- Directed by: Martin Frič
- Written by: Josef Neuberg; Rudolf Jaroš; Milan Noháč; Frantisek Vlček
- Starring: Oldřich Nový; Hana Vítová
- Cinematography: Karl Degl
- Edited by: Jan Kohout
- Music by: Julius Kalaš
- Production company: Československý státní film
- Release date: 1 April 1949
- Running time: 117 minutes
- Country: Czechoslovakia
- Language: Czech

The Poacher's Foster Daughter or Noble Millionaire (Czech: Pytlákova schovanka aneb Šlechetný milionář) is a Czech comedy film directed by Martin Frič. It was released in 1949.

== Cast ==
- Hana Vítová as Elén Hadrbolcová/Young Bětuška Hadrbolcová
- Oldřich Nový as Millionaire René Skalský
- Ella Nollová as Bětuška Hadrbolcová, Elén's mother
- Otomar Korbelář as Poacher Jan Dubský, Elénin stepfather
- Theodor Pištěk as Factory owner Richard Skalský
- Zdeněk Dítě as Violinist Pavel Sedloň
- Bohumil Machník as Valet Bolton
- Vítězslav Vejražka as Malhorn, director of a theatre agency
- Arnold Flögl as Actor Jan Balada, Elén's father
- František Paul as MUDr. Lexa Otok
- Marie Blažková as Anita Nováková
- Eman Fiala as Voice teacher Leonardo Bianchini
- Jan W. Speerger as Burglar Joe Pelíšek
- Jarmila Smejkalová as Klára
- Irena Bernátová as Zuzana Hromasová
