= Liza Soars to the Skies =

Lízin let do nebe
- Directed by: Václav Binovec
- Starring: Josef Kemr
- Release date: 1937
- Running time: 102 minutes
- Country: Czechoslovakia
- Language: Czech

Liza Soars to the Skies (Lízin let do nebe) is a 1937 Czechoslovak film directed by Václav Binovec. The film starred Josef Kemr.
