= Pobočník Jeho Výsosti =

1933 film

- Directed by: Martin Frič
- Written by: Václav Wasserman; Emil Artur Longen
- Starring: Vlasta Burian
- Cinematography: Otto Heller
- Release date: 1933
- Running time: 77 minutes
- Country: Czechoslovakia
- Language: Czech

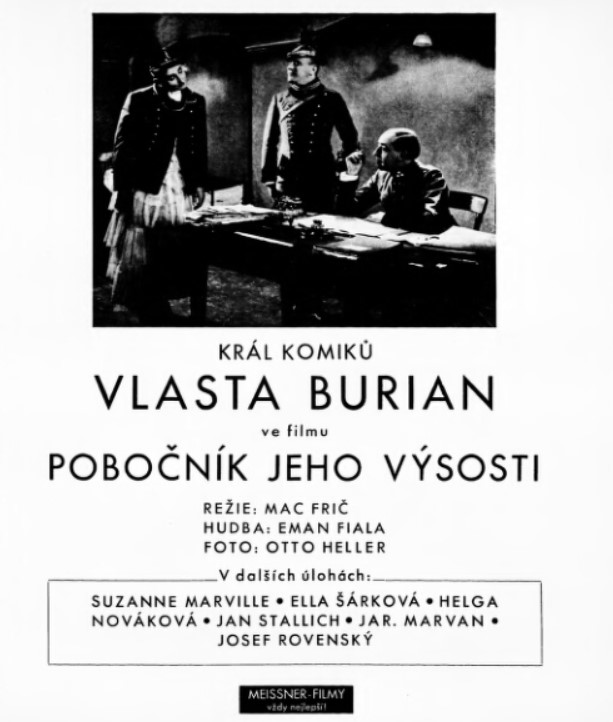
Poster for the film from 1933

Pobočník Jeho Výsosti is a Czech comedy film directed by Martin Frič. It was released in 1933.

== Cast ==
- Vlasta Burian as 2nd Lt. Alois Patera
- Nora Stallich as Princ Evzen
- Suzanne Marwille as Princezna Anna Luisa
- Jaroslav Marvan as Plukovník
- Bedrich Vrbský as Kinzl, podplukovník
- Helga Nováková as Pepina Kalasová
- Ela Sárková as Bardáma
- Alexander Trebovský as Guth, policejní rada
- František Kreuzmann as Paces, sikovatel
- Frantisek Cerný as Kuchar u posádky v Mnuku
- Marie Grossová as Císnice u Maxima
- Ladislav Hemmer as Richard Mádr, rytmistr
