= Anton Spelec, Sharp-Shooter =

1932 film

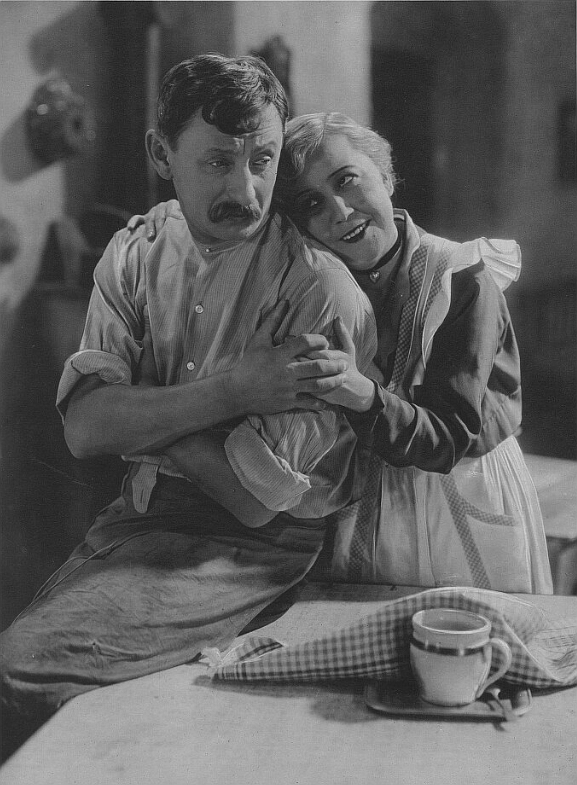
- Vlasta Burian and Růžena Šlemrová in the film
- Directed by: Martin Frič
- Written by: Emil Artur Longen; Josef Neuberg
- Starring: Vlasta Burian
- Cinematography: Otto Heller
- Edited by: Martin Frič
- Release date: 16 December 1932
- Running time: 85 minutes
- Country: Czechoslovakia
- Language: Czech

Anton Spelec, Sharp-Shooter (Czech: Anton Špelec, ostrostřelec) is a Czech comedy film directed by Martin Frič. It was released in 1932.

== Cast ==
- Vlasta Burian - Anton Spelec
- Růžena Šlemrová - Tereza
- Jaroslav Marvan - Kacaba
- Theodor Pištěk - Alois
- Jindřich Plachta - Kukacka
- Jirí Dréman - Chief of Sharpshooters
- Ella Nollová - Aunt Josefína
- Karel Postranecký - Rudolf's Friend
- František Kreuzmann - Vagabond
- Alexander Trebovský - Presiding Judge
- Čeněk Šlégl - Advocate
- Karel Schleichert - Member of Senate
- Viktor Nejedlý - Court Clerk
- Emanuel Hríbal - Court Attendant
- Ferdinand Jarkovský - Cellist
