= Suzanne Marwille =

Czech actress

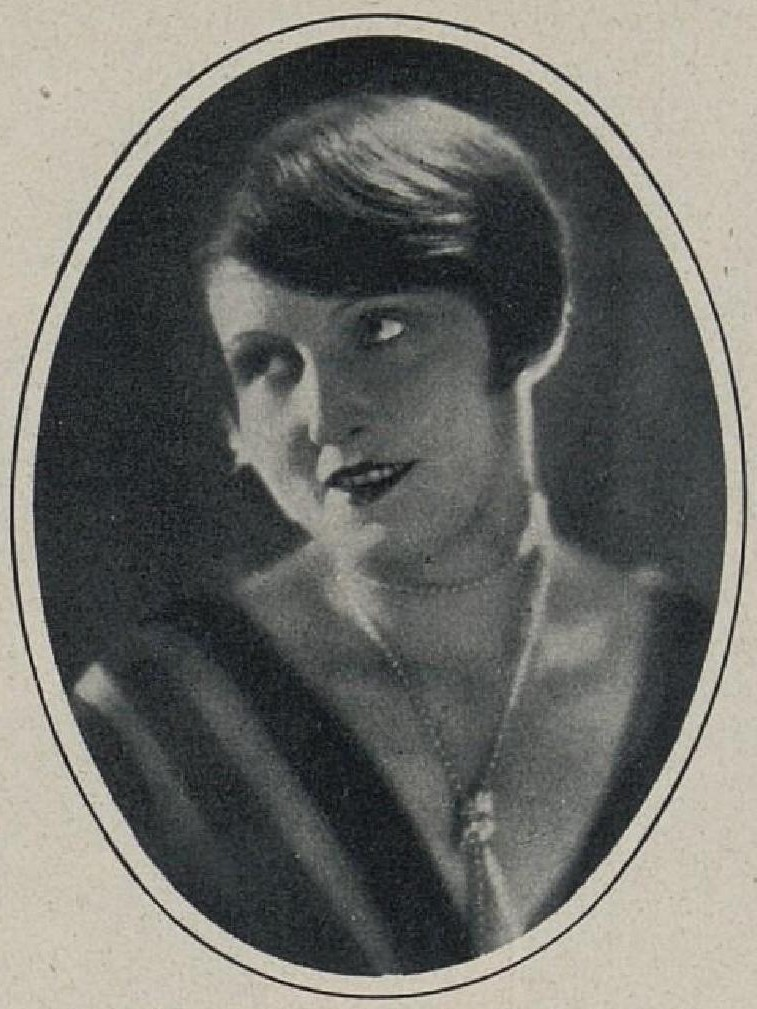
- Suzanne Marwille in 1928.
- Born: Marta Schölerová; 11 July 1895; Prague, Bohemia, Austria-Hungary (now Czech Republic)
- Died: 14 January 1962 (aged 66); Prague, Czechoslovakia (now Czech Republic)
- Occupation: Actress
- Years active: 1918–1938
- Spouse: Martin Frič

Marta Schölerová (better known by her stage name, Suzanne Marwille; 11 July 1895 – 14 January 1962) was a Czech film actress. Marwille was born in Prague. She had four siblings, and was the daughter of Emerich Schöler and his wife Bedřiška Peceltová. By the age of 18, she married Gustav Schullenbauer.

== Selected filmography ==
- Za svobodu národa (1920)
- Madame Golvery (1923)
- The Money Devil (1923)
- Modern Marriages (1924)
- Two Children (1924)
- Father Vojtech (1929)
- The Organist at St. Vitus' Cathedral (1929)
- All for Love (1930)
- Chudá holka (1930)
- Sister Angelika (1932)
- Pobočník Jeho Výsosti (1933)
- Hordubalové (1938)
