= I'll Be Right Over =

1942 Czechoslovak comedy film

- Directed by: Otakar Vávra
- Written by: Saša Rašilov; František Vlček; Otakar Vávra
- Starring: Saša Rašilov
- Release date: 1942
- Running time: 93 minutes
- Country: Czechoslovakia
- Language: Czech

I'll Be Right Over (Czech: Přijdu hned) is a 1942 Czechoslovak comedy film directed by Otakar Vávra.

== Cast ==
- Saša Rašilov as Václav Barvínek - vycpavac zvere
- Vlasta Matulová as Julinka Tichá - florist
- Svatopluk Beneš as Ing. Jirí Hora - chemist
- Theodor Pištěk as Alois Trachta - innkeeper
- Růžena Šlemrová as Miss Demourová - householder
