= Eduard Bass =

Czech prose writer, journalist, singer and actor

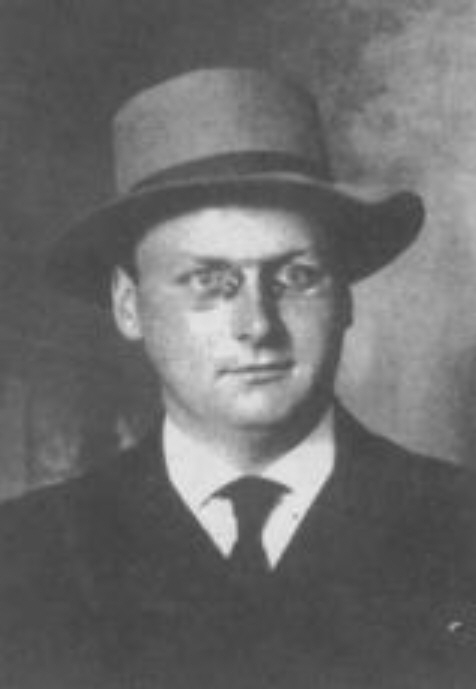
- Eduard Bass in 1930
- Born: Eduard Schmidt; 1 January 1888; Prague, Bohemia, Austria-Hungary
- Died: 2 October 1946 (aged 58); Prague, Czechoslovakia
- Resting place: Vyšehrad Cemetery, Prague
- Occupations: Prose writer, journalist
- Writing career
- Notable works: Klapzubova jedenáctka Cirkus Humberto

Signature
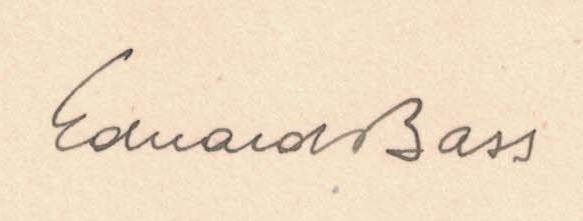

Eduard Bass (born Eduard Schmidt; 1 January 1888 – 2 October 1946) was a Czech prose writer, journalist and singer. He began his career as a cabaret artist, but from 1920 he worked as a journalist and was one of the most respected journalists of his time. During his journalistic career, he also wrote several novels. His most famous works include Klapzubova jedenáctka and Cirkus Humberto.

== Life ==
Eduard Bass was born Eduard Schmidt on 1 January 1888 in the Újezd district of Prague. In 1905, he graduated from the real school in Prague-Old Town and at the same time he apprenticed with his father, who owned a small brush factory. From 1905, he studied chemistry at the Czech Technical University in Prague, but also worked as a sales representative for his father's company. While working, he travelled around Europe, attending cabaret performances, and he aspired to perform in cabaret himself.

In 1910, he began performing in the Prague cabaret U Bílé labutě ('At White Swan'). Because the singer František Leopold Šmíd with a similar surname was the main star there, he took the pseudonym Bass after his sonorous bass voice. In 1913, he moved to the Červená sedma ('Red Seven') cabaret, and later became its director. In 1915, he married actress (and later sculptor) Táňa Kryková and moved into a house on the square Jiráskovo náměstí.

During World War I, due to heart disease, he worked as a typist. In that time, he had the time and freedom to publish in magazines as a journalist. He founded the satirical journals Leták and Šibeničky, where he criticised the situation in Austria-Hungary. From 1920, he became an editor of the newspaper Lidové noviny, but soon he also became a columnist and reporter. His skills made him a reader's favorite and he helped the newspaper's popularity. In 1933–1938, he was the editor-in-chief of Lidové noviny. He then had to leave for political reasons, but continued to contribute to the newspaper as an independent journalist until 1941.

In 1945, Bass returned to his job as editor in Lidové noviny (that time called Svobodné noviny), and served as editor-in-chief from May 1945 to August 1946. Due to the death of his wife in 1945 and other circumstances, he was unable to concentrate on his work and left the newspaper for good. Eduard Bass died of heart disease in Prague on 2 October 1946, at the age of 58. He is buried at the Vyšehrad Cemetery.

== Work ==
Bass's best-known work includes the humorous novel Klapzubova jedenáctka (The Chattertooth Eleven; 1922). It was published in English in 1943 and republished in 2008. It is about an invincible football team of eleven brothers. It was adapted as the film Klapzubova jedenáctka (1938) and TV series Klapzubova jedenáctka (1968).

Other successful novels by Bass are Cirkus Humberto (1941) and Lidé z maringotek (1942). Both are about people working in circuses, the first written as epic saga and the second in the form of short stories. The first was filmed as a TV series (Cirkus Humberto; 1988) and the second as a movie (People on Wheels; 1966).

=== Selected works ===
His literary work include:

- Případ čísla 128 a jiné historky (1921) – short stories
- Klapzubova jedenáctka (The Chattertooth Eleven; 1922)
- Potulky pražského reportéra (1929)
- To Arbes nenapsal, Vrchlický nebásnil (1939)
- Čtení o roce osmačtyřicátém (1940) – non-fiction
- Cirkus Humberto (1941)
- Lidé z maringotek (1942) – short stories

== Honours ==
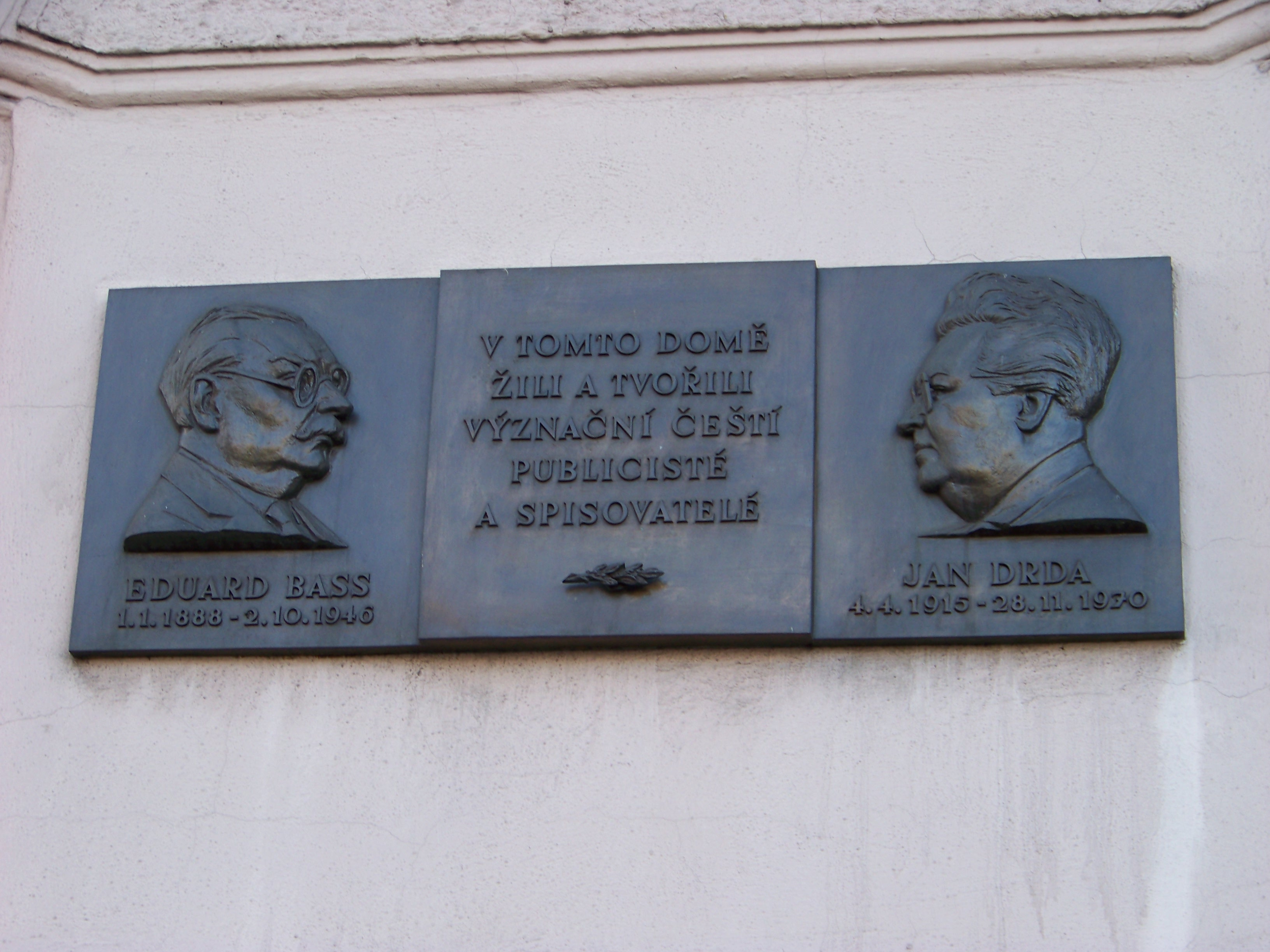
Memorial plaque on Bass's house

On the house on Jiráskovo Square in Prague 2, where Bass lived and where the writer Jan Drda also later lived, there is a memorial plaque dedicated to both writers.

== See also ==
- List of Czech writers
