= Antonie Hegerlíková =

Czech actress

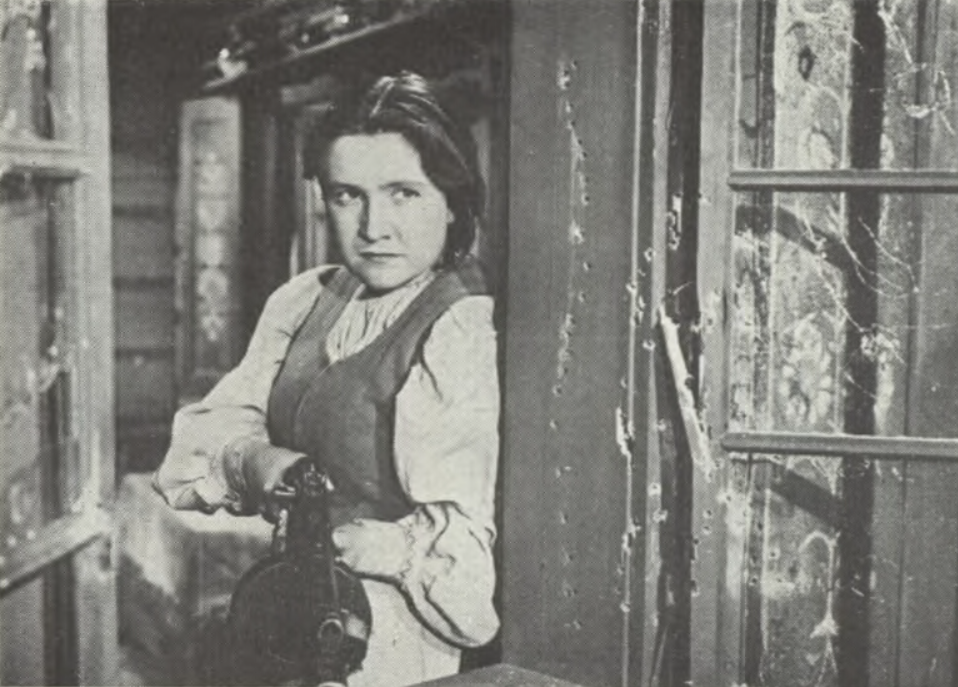
- Hegerlíková in 1951
- Born: 27 November 1923; Bratislava, Czechoslovakia
- Died: 11 December 2012 (aged 89); Prague, Czech Republic
- Occupation: Actress
- Years active: 1943–2009

Antonie Hegerlíková (27 November 1923 – 11 December 2012) was a Czech actress, whose career in film, television and theatre endured for more than seventy years. Radio Prague called Hegerlíková, "one of the last living stars from the golden era of Czech film."

In addition to film, her television roles included the long running Czechoslovak 1970s television series, F. L. Věk, based on the novel of the same name. Her theatre credits included Maryša, Lady Macbeth in Shakespeare's Macbeth, and Nora in Henrik Ibsen's A Doll's House. Hegerlíková was awarded a Thalia Award in 2004 for her contributions to Czech theatre.

Hegerlíková was born in Bratislava, Czechoslovakia, on 27 November 1923. She died in Prague, Czech Republic, on 11 December 2012, at the age of 89.
