= Tři vejce do skla =

- Directed by: Martin Frič
- Written by: Václav Wasserman
- Starring: Vlasta Burian
- Cinematography: Ferdinand Pečenka
- Release date: 24 September 1937
- Running time: 94 minutes
- Country: Czechoslovakia
- Language: Czech

Tři vejce do skla (Three Eggs in a Glass) is a Czech comedy film directed by Martin Frič. It was released in 1937.

== Plot ==
Vincenc Babočka, a meaningless employee of police station, thinks he is a detective with exceptional abilities. Holiday in Karlovy Vary gives him an opportunity to prove to everyone what he is really worth. He is mistakenly considered to be police prosecuted international adventurer Leon Weber. He decides to take advantage of the confusion and tries to find Leon's accomplices that are getting ready to steal diamonds belonging to the Maharaja of Yohir. According to Weber plan, he meets the Maharaja in disguise for Prince Narishkin. Everything is going according to the plan until the real Weber appears...

== Cast ==
- Vlasta Burian as Vincenc Babočka / Leon Weber / Prince Narishkin
- Antonín Novotný (actor) as Van Houden
- Helena Bušová as Sandra, secretary
- Míla Reymonová as Jiřina, Weber's lover
- Bohuš Záhorský as Alois, accomplice of Weber
- Rudolf Kadlec as Yohir, false maharaja
- Karel Dostál as the secretary of the false maharaja
- Jaroslav Marvan as a doctor
- Theodor Pištěk as a police commissioner
- Čeněk Šlégl as a client of Babočka
