= Him and His Sister =

1931 film

- Directed by: Karel Lamač; Martin Frič
- Written by: Václav Wasserman; Bernhard Buchbinder (play)
- Starring: Vlasta Burian
- Cinematography: Otto Heller
- Edited by: Karel Lamač
- Release date: April 1931
- Running time: 92 minutes
- Country: Czechoslovakia
- Language: Czech

Him and His Sister (Czech: On a jeho sestra) is a Czech comedy film directed by Karel Lamač and Martin Frič. It was released in April 1931, and was ninth in the top-ten list of films shown in Prague cinemas that year. The film adapts a play by Bernhard Buchbinder. The film has a German version (Er und seine Schwester) released the same year, by the same director but with a partially different cast.

== Cast ==
- Vlasta Burian as Jarda Brabec, a postman
- Anny Ondra as Anny Brabcová, his sister, Sabina's maid
- Otto Rubík as Bernard
- Olga Augustová as Sabina Veldenová, operetta soubrette
- Jan Sviták as Burda, Sabina's friend
- Theodor Pištěk as postmaster general

== Reception ==
The interpretation of Vlasta Burian and Anny Ondra in the film has been called "brilliant". The film was a commercial success, which, in 2013, Robert Rohál commented: "Lamač actually managed to do the seemingly impossible – to put a male and female clown in front of the camera."
