= Růžena Šlemrová =

Czech actress

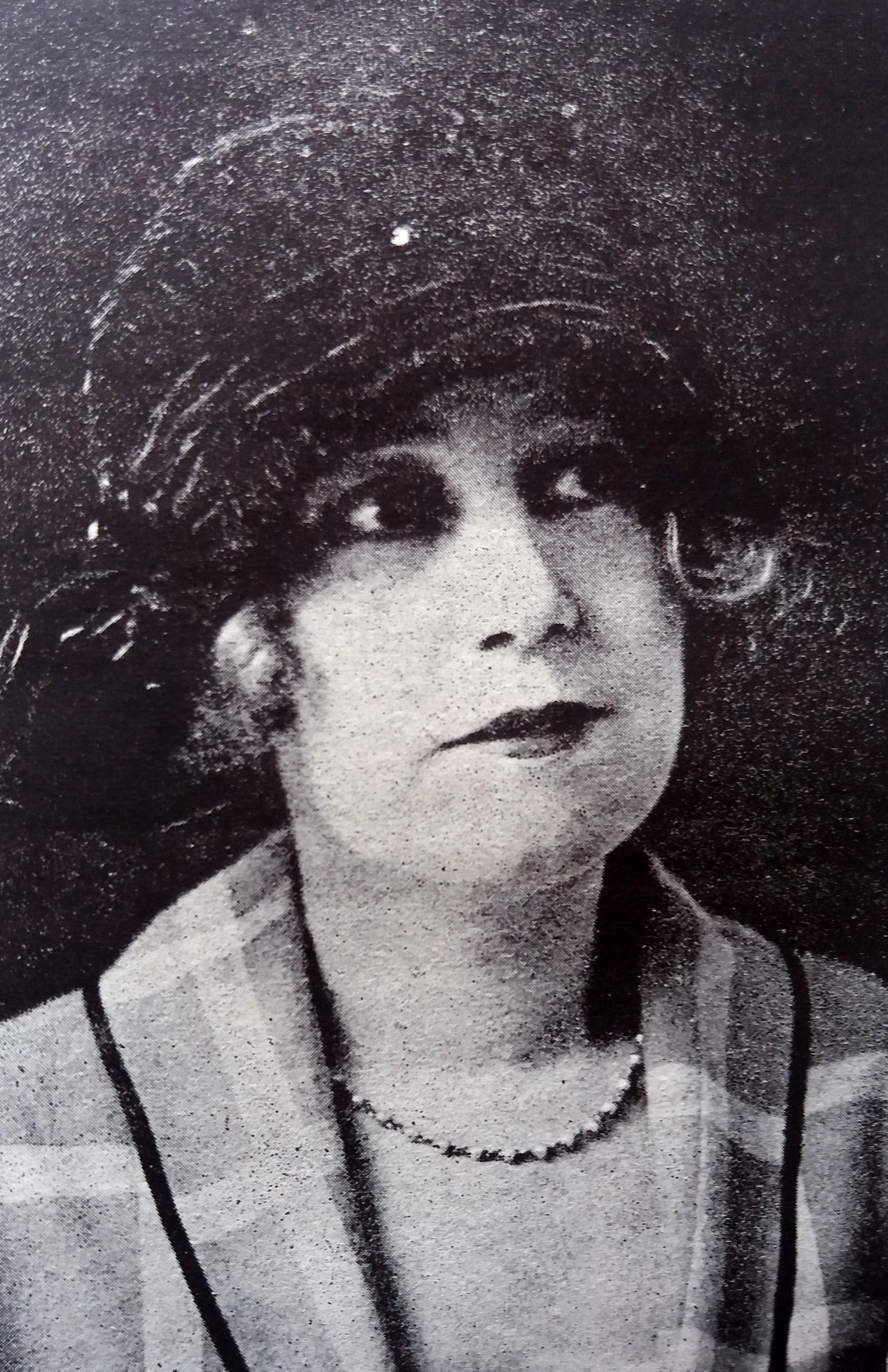
- Šlemrová in 1923
- Born: 10 November 1886; Plzeň, Bohemia, Austria-Hungary
- Died: 24 August 1962 (aged 75); Prague, Czechoslovakia
- Resting place: Vinohrady Cemetery
- Occupation: Actress
- Years active: 1914–1956

Růžena Šlemrová, née Růžena Machová (10 November 1886 – 24 August 1962) was a Czech film actress. She appeared in more than 70 films between 1914 and 1956.

== Selected filmography ==
- Two Mothers (1921)
- Affair at the Grand Hotel (1929)
- Anton Spelec, Sharp-Shooter (1932)
- The Undertaker (1932)
- Camel Through the Eye of a Needle (1936)
- The Seamstress (1936)
- Delightful Story (1936)
- Krok do tmy (1937)
- Andula Won (1937)
- Lidé na kře (1937)
- Lawyer Vera (1937)
- Pacientka Dr. Hegla (1940)
- Dívka v modrém (1940)
- The Catacombs (1940)
- Auntie's Fantasies (1941)
- In the Still of the Night (1941)
- I'll Be Right Over (1942)
- Fourteen at the Table (1943)
- The Wedding Ring (1944)
- Spring Song (1944)
- Saturday (1945)
