= Father Vojtech (1929 film) =

1929 film by Martin Frič

Father Vojtěch
- Directed by: Martin Frič
- Written by: Martin Frič; Jan Klecanda
- Starring: Karel Lamač
- Cinematography: Otto Heller
- Production company: Bratři Deglové
- Distributed by: Degl a spol.
- Release date: 1 March 1929
- Running time: 96 minutes
- Country: Czechoslovakia
- Language: Czech

Father Vojtěch (Czech: Páter Vojtěch) is a 1929 silent Czech romance film directed by Martin Frič. It was Frič's debut film as a director.

== Cast ==
- Josef Rovenský as Dvorecký
- Karel Lamač as Vojtěch
- Ladislav H. Struna as Karel
- Suzanne Marwille as Frantina
- Karel Schleichert as Stárek
- Eman Fiala as Josífek
- Anna Opplová as Josífek's Mother
- Jindřich Plachta as Musician
- Jaroslav Marvan as Josef Knotek
- Eduard Šlégl as Priest
- Karel Němec as Innkeeper
- Jan Richter as Maránek
- Fred Bulín as Young Nobleman
- Josef Kobík as Policeman
- Karel Fiala as Abbot
