= Battle of Partizánska Ľupča =

- Part of the Operation B (1945–1947) and Anti-communist insurgencies in Eastern Europe
Date	5 August 1947
Location	Partizánska Ľupča, Czechoslovakia
Result	Ukrainian victory

Belligerents
Ukrainian Insurgent Army	Czechoslovakia

Commanders and leaders
Volodymyr Shchyhelskyi	Unknown

Strength
17	18

Casualties and losses
None	6 killed 2 wounded 3 captured

The Battle of Partizánska Ľupča took place on 5 August 1947, as a Czechoslovak reconnaissance unit was ambushed by UPA partisans.

== Prelude ==
During one of the clashes between Czechoslovak and UPA forces, near Malužiná, the UPA sotnia of Volodymyr Shchyhelskyi (nom de guerre "Burlak") was forced to retreat and sought refuge around the mountain Magury Lupče. As a result, 18 inexperienced Czechoslovak troops, armed only with rifles and submachine guns, were sent into reconnaissance mission to find Burlak's sotnia. For an unknown reason, more experienced troops weren't sent to this mission, despite being aware of the danger from a more experienced UPA unit.

== Battle ==
Czechoslovak troops arrived in the area where they were meant to find UPA partisans and lure them into an ambush. As Volodymyr Shchyhelskyi himself reported on the battle, he noticed the incoming Czechoslovak troops, 3,050 metres away from the UPA post, whom he believed were followed by stronger forces. UPA commander Volodymyr Shchyhelskyi didn't have time to retreat to the forest, so he ordered his sotnia to take positions and fire at the incoming platoon. The Czechoslovak troops responded passively to the UPA fire and inflicted no casualties. As a result of the battle, 6 Czechoslovak troops were killed and 5 were wounded, 3 of whom were taken prisoner.

== Aftermath ==
Shchyhelskyi looted the Czechoslovak possessions, but spared the captured Czechoslovaks and gave them medical treatment. After this, he asked the Czechoslovak captives, after they're discovered, to send a message to Czechoslovak commanders that this battle was a repayment for Malužiná and stated he will stop being merciful if his unit is attacked again. UPA partisans managed to break further Westward from the Czechoslovak encirclement. The Czechoslovak defeat at Partizánska Ľupča was considered to be the biggest failure of Czechoslovak forces in 1947. Czechoslovak commander Július Nosko now chose to concentrate his efforts on eliminating Burlak's unit. This was accomplished in early September and Shchyhelskyi was captured, sentenced to death in 1949. The names of 6 aspiring Czechoslovak troops that died in battle were erected on the side of Slovak uprising memorials in Ružomberok and Partizánska Ľupča.

== Bibliography ==
- В'ятрович, Володимир (2001). Рейди УПА теренами Чехословаччини (in Ukrainian). Літопис УПА. ISBN 0-920092-57-8.
