= Rudolf Deyl Jr. =

Czech actor (1912–1967)

Rudolf Deyl
- Born: 6 July 1912; Prague, Bohemia, Austria-Hungary
- Died: 21 November 1967 (aged 55); Prague, Czechoslovakia
- Occupation: Actor
- Years active: 1934–1967

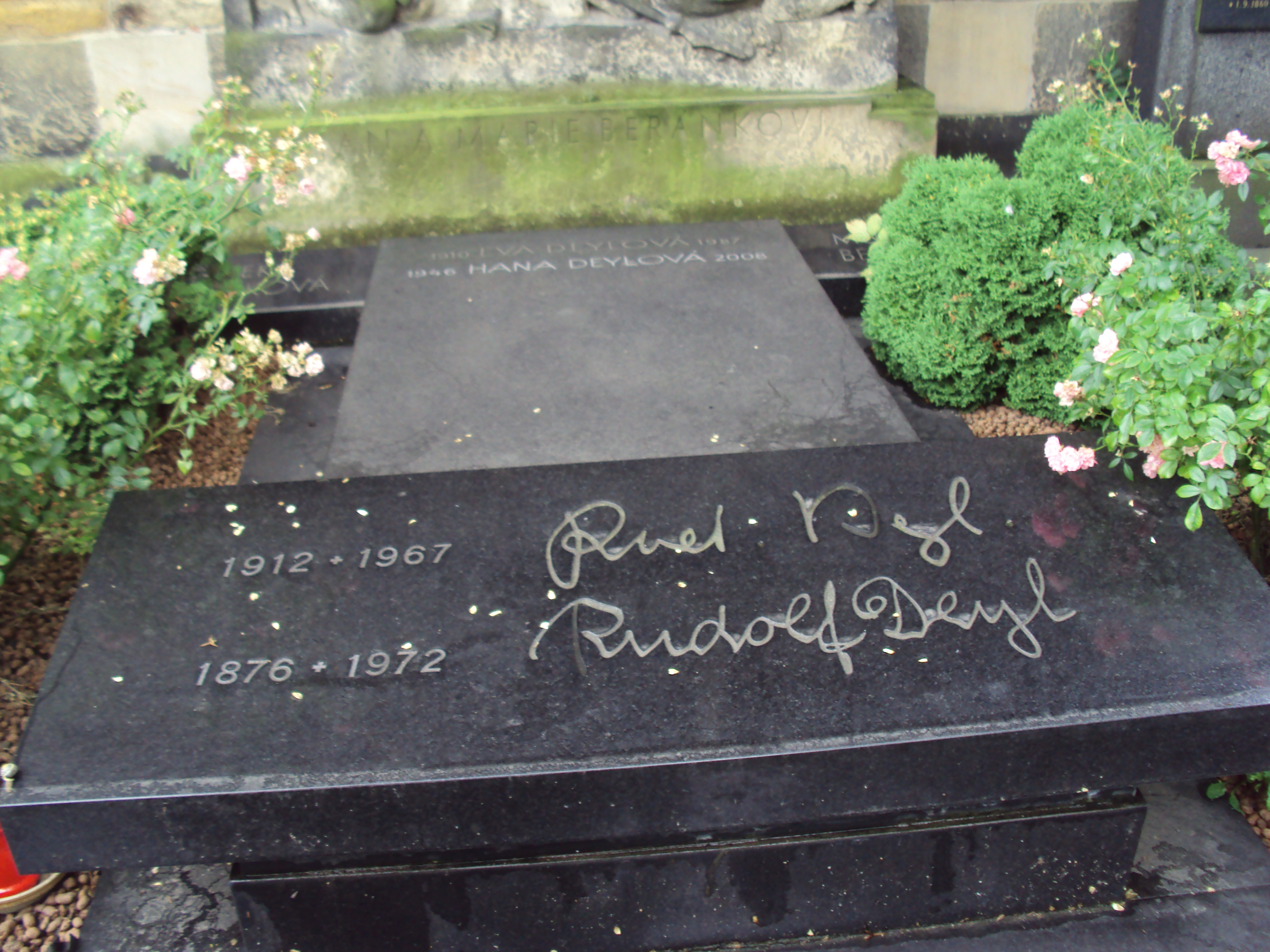
Grave of the Deyl family at the Vyšehrad Cemetery in Prague

Rudolf Deyl (6 July 1912 – 21 November 1967) was a Czech actor. His father Rudolf Deyl Sr. was also an actor.

== Selected filmography ==
Film
Year	Title	Role	Notes
1966	The Phantom of Morrisville	Coroner	
1964	Lemonade Joe	Doug Badman	
1964	Hvězda zvaná Pelyněk	Noha	
1958	Hvězda jede na jih	Alfréd Necásek	
1953	The Secret of Blood	Papik	
