= Václav Wasserman =

Czech actor

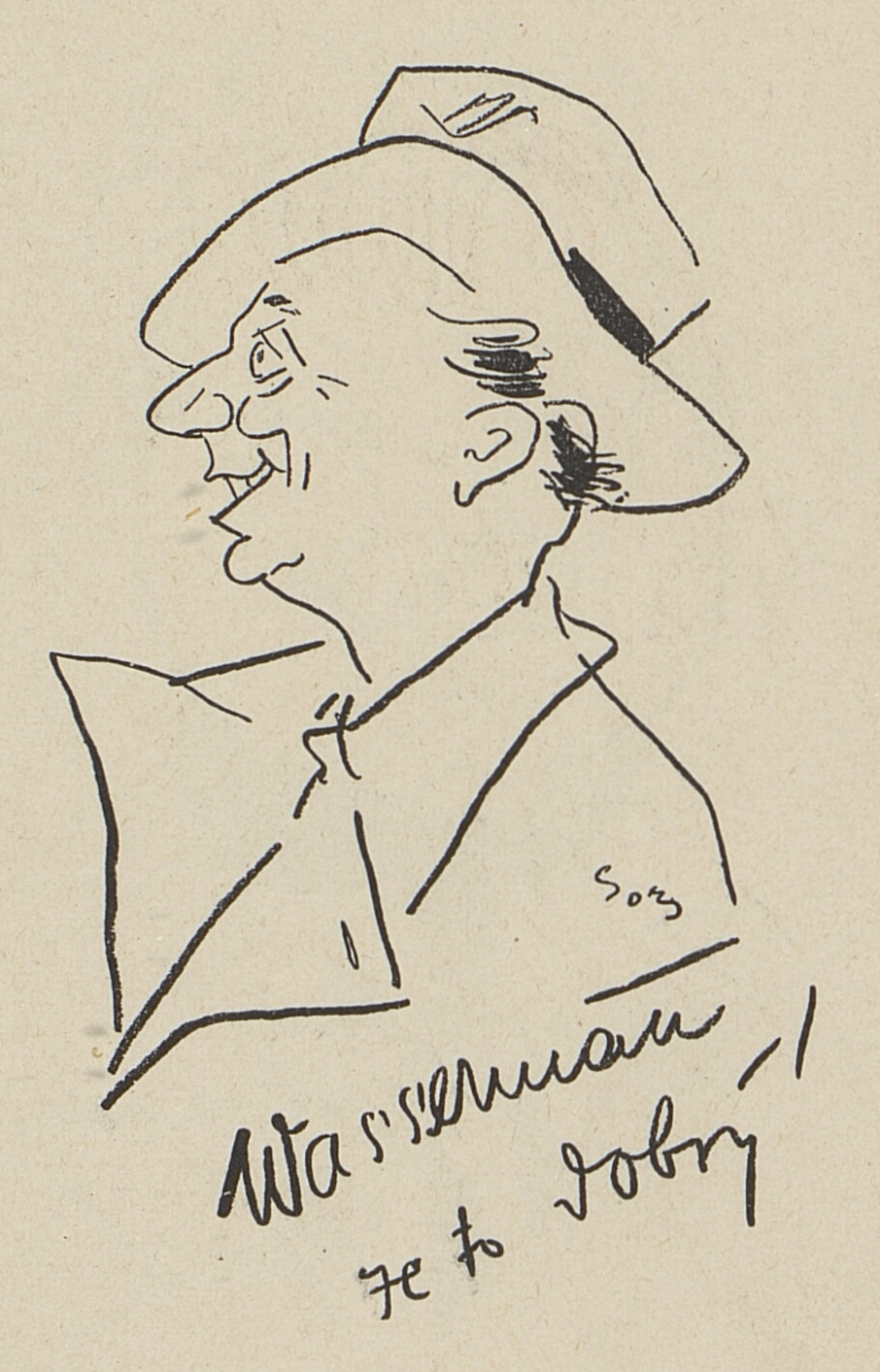
- Caricature of Václav Wassermann by Ivan Sors (1923)
- Born: 19 February 1898; Prague, Bohemia, Austria-Hungary
- Died: 28 January 1967 (aged 68); Prague, Czechoslovakia
- Occupations: Screenwriter; actor; film director
- Years active: 1920–1958

Václav Wasserman (19 February 1898 – 28 January 1967) was a Czech screenwriter, film actor and director. He wrote for 91 films between 1920 and 1958.

== Selected filmography ==
- From the Czech Mills (1925)
- The May Fairy (1926)
- The Organist at St. Vitus' Cathedral (1929)
- Sin of a Beautiful Woman (1929)
- Imperial and Royal Field Marshal (1930)
- Fairground People (1930)
- Him and His Sister (1931)
- Business Under Distress (1931)
- The Last Bohemian (1931)
- Sister Angelika (1932)
- His Majesty's Adjutant (1932)
- The Undertaker (1932)
- Wehe, wenn er losgelassen (1932)
- The Ideal Schoolmaster (1932)
- Public Not Admitted (1933)
- Pobočník Jeho Výsosti (1933)
- The Ruined Shopkeeper (1933)
- Workers, Let's Go (1934)
- The Last Man (1934)
- The Seamstress (1936)
- Father Vojtech (1936)
- Lidé na kře (1937)
- Lawyer Vera (1937)
- Tři vejce do skla (1937)
- A Girl from the Chorus (1937)
- Škola základ života (1938)
- Ducháček Will Fix It (1938)
- Jiný vzduch (1939)
- The Catacombs (1940)
- Baron Prášil (1940)
- The Blue Star Hotel (1941)
- Saturday (1945)
