= Operation B (1947) =

1945–1947 military operation

- Part of the anti-communist insurgencies in Central and Eastern Europe
Date	10 June – 17 November 1947
Location	Czechoslovakia
Result	See § Aftermath

Belligerents
Czechoslovakia	Ukrainian Insurgent Army

Commanders and leaders
Jan Heřman; Július Nosko	Volodymyr Shchyhelskyi (POW); Mykhailo Duda (WIA)

Strength
13,500–15,340 men	400–500

Casualties and losses
39–68 killed (Note: 20 to 49 killed 19 deaths in accidents); 81 wounded 5 missing	61 killed 289 captured (Perhaps exaggerating)
- 50 Czechoslovak civilians killed

The Operation B was a name for Czechoslovak military operation aimed against members of Ukrainian Insurgent Army who entered Czechoslovak territory.

== Prelude ==
UPA was tasked with conducting raids into Czechoslovak territory. In particular, the goal was to analyze internal political situation of Czechoslovakia. UPA leadership believed that "Bolshevization" of Czechoslovakia was proceeding more slowly than in other Eastern states, so it was the best place to spread OUN propaganda. In September 1945, UPA fighters tasked with the raids were given training, in particular "to strengthen political education work in the departments raiding foreign lands". On 8 August 1945, insurgents completed their final preparations for the raid. First members of Ukrainian Insurgent Army entered Czechoslovakia on 13 August 1945, near the towns of Spišská Stará Ves and Medzilaborce. There were reports of other groups attacking and robbing villages near the border with Poland. Czechoslovakia sent more units to the area that pushed the UPA fighters back to Poland. Czechoslovak units were commanded by Colonel Jan Heřman.

Polish army launched an offensive against the Ukrainian Insurgent Army in January 1946. Czechoslovakia reacted by sending more units near borders expecting more UPA members trying to enter Czechoslovakia. Ukrainian Insurgent Army became more active near the Polish border with Slovakia and more units entered Czechoslovak territory there. In April 1946, units led by Colonel Heřman launched an offensive against insurgents pushing them back to Poland. During late 1946, situation in Slovakia became calmer.

== Operation ==
During early 1947, insurgents led some raids to Czechoslovak territory and during summer 1947 launched their largest attack to Czechoslovakia trying to reach western Europe through its territory. Some groups even reached Moravia and South Bohemia. The bloodiest clash occurred on 5 August 1947, near Partizánska Ľupča, which resulted in death of 6 members of Czechoslovak security forces. Czechoslovak units were gradually destroying Ukrainian insurgents, and fights concluded on 17 November 1947, when the last forces of the Ukrainian Insurgent Army were pushed out. Members of OUN raided 33 villages in Czechoslovakia.

== Aftermath ==
Teplice Production Association dated October 3, 1947 No. 70 stated that the movement of UPA units to the territory of the Czechoslovak Republic was definitively halted. After 17 days, the last 82nd order of this unit was issued, declaring its complete disbandment. According to the Czechoslovak Ministry of the Interior, as a result of the operation “Action B”, 59 OUN members were killed, 39 were captured and wounded, 217 people were taken prisoner and 29 people surrendered voluntarily. On the Czechoslovak side, 24 soldiers and state security officers were killed. Only 1/5 of the original composition – 97 people – reached the American occupation zone. However, for a long time (until the autumn of 1949) groups of Ukrainian rebels who had lost contact with the command, or members of the OUN civilian network who came with special tasks to maintain contact, kept arriving in West Germany. In total, according to information from Stepan Bandera, about 300 UPA fighters and members of the OUN civilian network arrived in Germany during the years 1947–1949.

== Popular culture ==
1951 Czechoslovak film Operation B focuses on Czechoslovaks participating in military operations against Ukrainian Insurgent Army.

1975 episode of Thirty Cases of Major Zeman called Ruby Crosses was inspired by Ukrainian Insurgent Army activities in Czechoslovakia.

The 1978 film Shadows of a Hot Summer focuses on a family taken hostage by Ukrainian Insurgent Army.

The 1984 film Pasáček z doliny depicts members of Ukrainian Insurgent Army who entered Czechoslovakia.

== See also ==
- Operation Vistula
- Operation Barium

== Bibliography ==
- В'ятрович, Володимир (2001). Рейди УПА теренами Чехословаччини (in Ukrainian). Літопис УПА. ISBN 0-920092-57-8.
