= Vlasta Burian =

Czech actor (1891–1962)

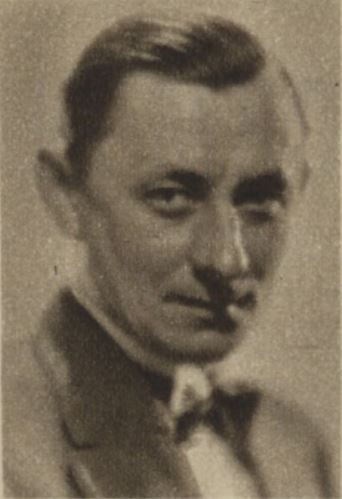
- Vlasta Burian in 1942
- Born: Josef Vlastimil Burian; 9 April 1891; Liberec, Bohemia, Austria-Hungary
- Died: 31 January 1962 (aged 70); Prague, Czechoslovakia
- Occupations: Actor, director, comedian and athlete
- Years active: 1923–1945; 1950–1962
- Spouse: Nina Červenková (1919–1962)
- Partner: Anna Emílie Pírkovová (1911–1912)

Josef Vlastimil Burian, better known as Vlasta Burian, (9 April 1891 – 31 January 1962) was a Czech actor, singer, comedian, footballer and film director. He is among the most famous Czech actors and comedians of the first half of the 20th century. In the Czech Republic, he is nicknamed "King of Comedians".

== Early life ==
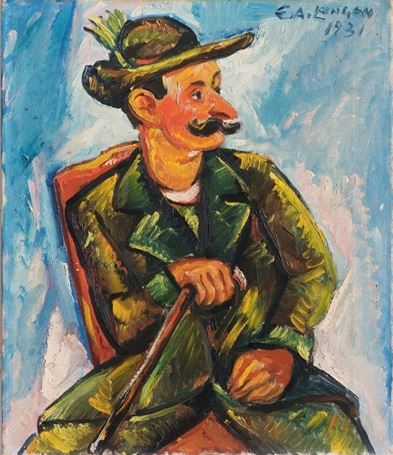
Portrait of Burian by Emil Artur Longen (1931)

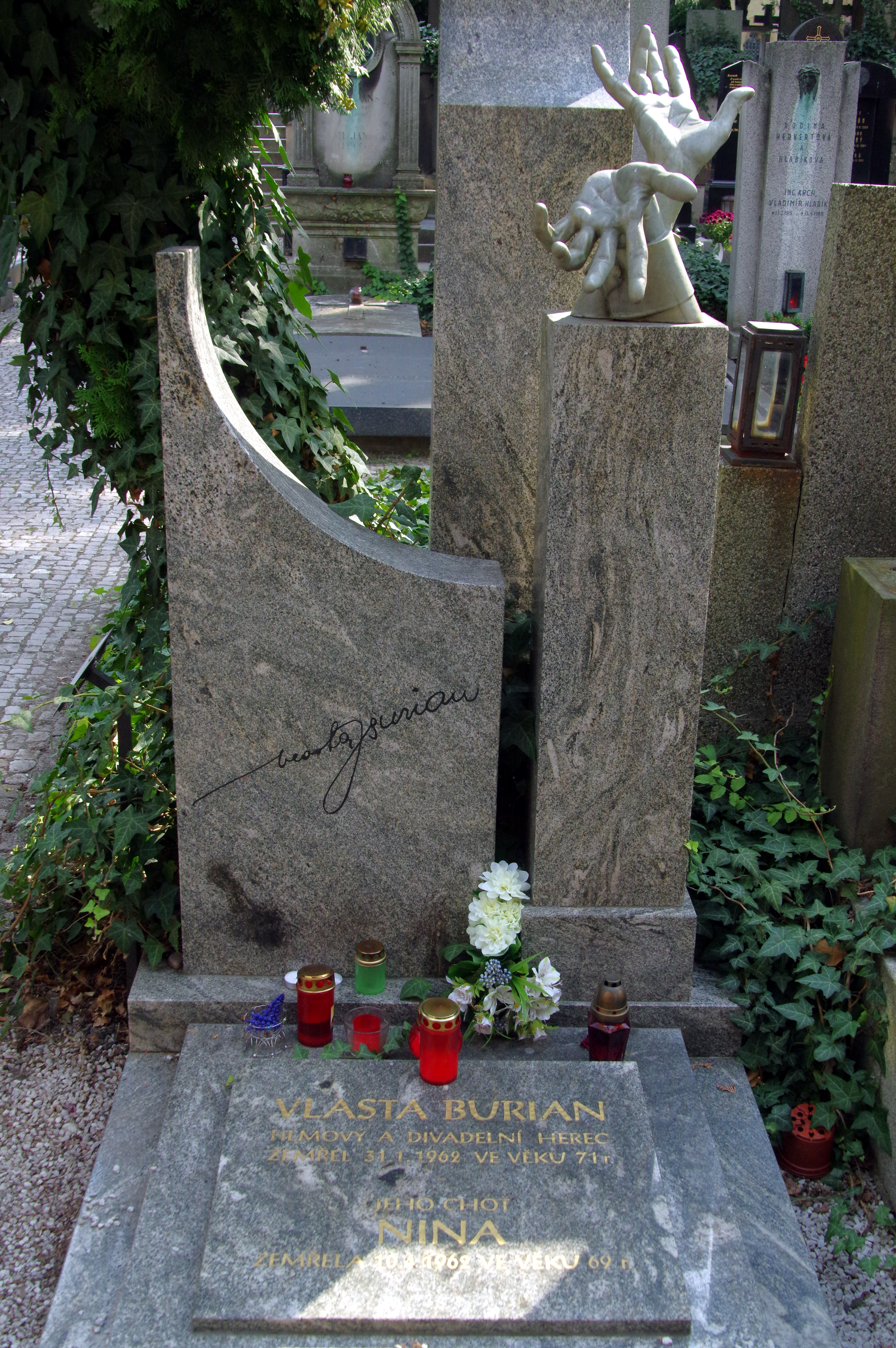
Grave at Vyšehrad Cemetery in Prague

Vlasta Burian was born on 9 April 1891 in Liberec to a tailor, patriot and volunteer Antonín Burian (*1863) and his five years older wife Maria Burianová, née Škaloudová (*1858), who had a daughter Žofia Picková (*1884) from a previous marriage. He spent the first ten years of his life in Liberec. On 5 May 1901, his family moved to the Prague suburb of Žižkov, because his father did not have a suitable environment for patriotic activities in Liberec, where the majority of the population was German.

He got a job as an official collecting food taxes in Prague and regularly took his young son to the National Theatre. Josef Vlastimil later learned business manuals at a business school. As the son of a tailor, from childhood he met people who were interested in the theatre and had the opportunity to hear stories from this environment. He himself sang in the choir as a child and liked opera.

Young Vlasta Burian was also very fond of sports. He excelled especially in football, he was a goalkeeper. He played for Slavoj Žižkov in the 1913–14 season, before playing for Sparta Prague (1914–1917) and then Viktoria Žižkov (1917–18). He also actively participated in competitive cycling and tennis, frequently winning races and tournaments (evidenced by a collection of his trophies). However, his theatrical pursuits eventually took precedence over most of his athletic endeavors.

Initially, his comedic talents were showcased primarily for friends at private gatherings. Over time, these performances transitioned to public settings. While his father initially discouraged such public performances, witnessing his son's act at a pub led him to recognize his son's comedic abilities and no longer posed a barrier to his artistic pursuits.

Burian died on 31 January 1962 in Prague.

=== Personal life ===
Vlasta Burian had a daughter, Emilia Burianová (1912–1996), with dancer Anna Emília Pírková. In 1919, he married Nina Červenková-Burianová. She remained a devoted companion throughout his career, attending every performance and offering unwavering support. Burian reportedly insisted on delaying shows until Nina arrived and even arranged for her to listen to his performances via phone when she was ill. Their daughter, Emilia, gave birth to a son, Vlastimil Kristl, in 1944.

While known for his comedic performances, Burian's private life reportedly contrasted with his public image. Accounts describe him as melancholic, prone to mood swings, and withdrawn. He also struggled with depression, possibly experiencing manic-depressive episodes (now known as bipolar disorder).

Despite his public persona, Burian reportedly led a more introverted life in private. He often retreated to his luxuriously furnished villa in Dejvice, where he maintained a rigorous exercise routine. The villa boasted a large gymnasium, a swimming pool, and a tennis court, reflecting his dedication to fitness. He was known to employ Jaromír Trejbal, considered one of the finest Czech chefs of the time. Burian's active lifestyle extended beyond his home; he regularly cycled in the mornings and organized friendly tennis matches, even outside of Prague, famously playing against two-time world champion Karel Koželuh at Klamovka.

== Career ==
Vlasta Burian was born on 9 April 1891 in Liberec. He is well known in the Czech Republic for his comic roles in many movies before and during World War II. His films are still shown regularly on Czech television, being particularly popular around Christmas time. He ran a popular comic theatre until 1944, when the Nazis closed down all Czech-language theatres.

After the war Burian was charged and convicted of collaboration with the Nazis. He was briefly imprisoned, and then not permitted to return to the stage until 1950. He was officially exonerated of all charges in 1994.

== Selected filmography ==
His frequent movie partner was Jaroslav Marvan. His filmography include:

- Tu ten kámen (1923)
- Falešná kočička aneb Když si žena umíní (1926)
- The Lovers of an Old Criminal (1927)
- Imperial and Royal Field Marshal (1930)
- Business Under Distress (1931)
- Him and His Sister (1931)
- The Undertaker (1932)
- Anton Spelec, Sharp-Shooter (1932)
- Lelíček in the Services of Sherlock Holmes (1932)
- Pobočník Jeho Výsosti (1933)
- The Twelve Chairs (1933)
- The Inspector General (1933)
- The Ruined Shopkeeper (1933)
- The Heroic Captain Korkorán (1934)
- Nezlobte dědečka (1934)
- Hrdina jedné noci (1935)
- Hero for a Night (1935)
- Tři vejce do skla (1937)
- Ducháček Will Fix It (1938)
- U pokladny stál... (1939)
- Ulice zpívá (1939)
- The Catacombs (1940)
- Baron Prášil (1940)
- Station Master (1941)
- Provdám svou ženu (1941)
- Ryba na suchu (1942)
- Zlaté dno (1942)
- The Hen and the Sexton (1951)
- Nejlepší člověk (1954)
- Muž v povětří (1956)
- Focus, Please! (1956)
