= Martin Frič =

Czech film director

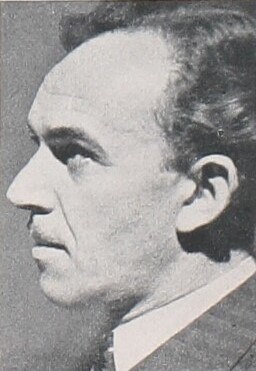
- Martin Frič in 1938
- Born: 29 March 1902; Prague, Bohemia, Austria-Hungary (now Czech Republic)
- Died: 26 August 1968 (aged 66); Prague, Czechoslovakia
- Occupations: Film director, screenwriter
- Years active: 1922-1968
- Spouse: Suzanne Marwille

Martin Frič (29 March 1902 – 26 August 1968) was a Czech film director, screenwriter and actor. He had more than 100 directing credits between 1929 and 1968, including feature films, shorts and documentary films.

== Personal life and death ==
Throughout his life, Frič struggled with alcoholism. On the day of the Warsaw Pact invasion of Czechoslovakia in 1968, he attempted suicide, after battling cancer. He died in the hospital five days later.

== Filmography ==
- Páter Vojtěch (1929)
- The Organist at St. Vitus' Cathedral (1929)
- All for Love (1930)
- Chudá holka (1930)
- On a jeho sestra (1931)
- Dobrý voják Švejk (1931)
- Der Zinker (1931)
- To neznáte Hadimršku (1931)
- Sestra Angelika (1932)
- Wehe, wenn er losgelassen (1932)
- The Ringer (1932)
- Anton Špelec, ostrostřelec (1932)
- Lelíček ve službách Sherlocka Holmese (1932)
- Život je pes (1933)
- S vyloučením veřejnosti (1933)
- Pobočník Jeho Výsosti (1933)
- Kantor Ideál (1933)
- The Inspector General (1933)
- Dvanáct křesel (1933)
- U snědeného krámu (1933)
- The Last Man (1934)
- Mazlíček (1934)
- Der Adjutant Seiner Hoheit (1934)
- Der Doppelbräutigam (1934)
- Hej-Rup! (1934)
- The Eleventh Commandment (1935)
- Jánošík (1935)
- Hero for a Night (1935)
- Ať žije nebožtík (1935)
- Hrdina jedné noci (1935)
- Ulička v ráji (1936)
- Švadlenka (1936)
- Páter Vojtěch (1936)
- Mravnost nade vše (1936)
- Svět patří nám (1937)
- Krok do tmy (1937)
- Lidé na kře (1937)
- Advokátka Věra (1937)
- Tři vejce do skla (1937)
- Hordubalové (1938)
- Škola základ života (1938)
- Muž z neznáma (1939)
- Kristián (1939)
- Jiný vzduch (1939)
- Cesta do hlubin študákovy duše (1939)
- Eva tropí hlouposti (1939)
- Katakomby (1940)
- Muzikantská Liduška (1940)
- Baron Prásil (1940)
- Druhá směna (1940)
- Těžký život dobrodruha (1941)
- Tetička (1941)
- Roztomilý člověk (1941)
- Hotel Modrá hvězda (1941)
- Valentin Dobrotivý (1942)
- Barbora Hlavsová (1943)
- Der zweite Schuß (1943)
- Experiment (1943)
- Počestné paní pardubické (1944)
- Dir zuliebe (1944)
- Prstýnek (1944)
- Černí myslivci (1945)
- 13. revír (1946)
- Varúj...! (1946)
- Čapkovy povídky (1947)
- Návrat domů (1948)
- Polibek ze stadionu (1948)
- Pytlákova schovanka aneb Šlechetný milionář (1949)
- Pětistovka (1949)
- Zocelení (1950)
- Bylo to v máji (1951)
- Past (1951)
- Císařův pekař - Pekařův císař (1952)
- Operation B (1952)
- Tajemství krve (1953)
- Psohlavci (1955)
- Nechte to na mně (1955)
- Zaostřit, prosím! (1956)
- Povodeň (1958)
- Dnes naposled (1958)
- The Princess with the Golden Star (1959)
- Bílá spona (1960)
- Dařbuján a Pandrhola (1960)
- Král Králů (1963)
- Hvězda zvaná Pelyněk (1964)
- Lidé z maringotek (1966)
- Přísně tajné premiéry (1967)
- Nejlepší ženská mého života (1968)
