= Jaroslav Marvan =

Czechoslovak actor

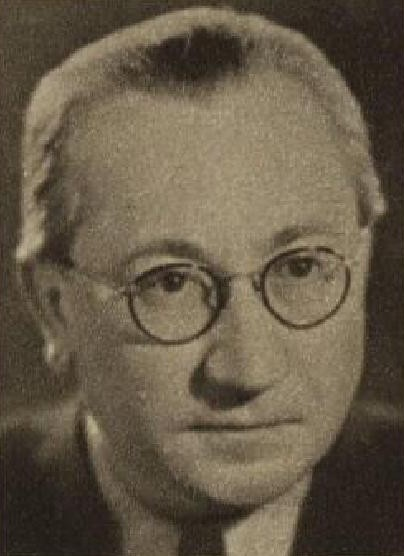
- Born: 11 December 1901; Žižkov, Austria-Hungary
- Died: 21 May 1974 (aged 72); Prague, Czechoslovakia
- Occupation: Actor
- Years active: 1926–1973

Jaroslav Marvan (11 December 1901 – 21 May 1974) was a Czech actor. He was born in Prague. He was married since the 1920s with Marie Marvanová and had a daughter (Alena Marvanová) with Alena Jančaříková.

He passed his school-leaving exam in 1919 and became a member of the Central Office of posts. He was sent to Uzghorod on business matters (1920–1923).

He was a member of Vlasta Burian's Theatre 1926–1943, then of the Vinohradské divadlo (1943–1950) and then of the Městská divadla pražská (1950–1954), from where he became a member of the Národní divadlo (National Theatre), where he served for until two years before his death, in 1974.

== Roles ==
=== Silent film era ===
His first roles in the silent film era include partaking in the following films:

- Dobrý voják Švejk
- Falešná kočička
- Pantáta Bezoušek
- Lásky Kačenky Strnadové
- Švejk v ruském zajetí
- Páter Vojtěch
- Modrý démant
- Svatý Václav
- Plukovník Švec

=== Sound film era ===
Afterwards, in the sound era, he worked exclusively with Burian, in the following films:

- C. a k. polní maršálek
- To neznáte Hadimršku
- Funebrák
- Anton Špelec, ostrostřelec
- Pobočník Jeho Výsosti
- Revizor
- Hrdinný kapitán Korkorán
- Nezlobte dědečka
- Hrdina jedné noci
- Tři vejce do skla
- Ducháček to zařídí
- U pokladny stál...
- Ulice zpívá
- Katakomby
- Baron Prášil
- Přednosta stanice
- Provdám svou ženu
- Ryba na suchu
- Zlaté dno

His most famous roles without Burian are roles of professors in the movies Cesta do hlubin študákovy duše (1939) and Škola, základ života (1938) and the role of tram inspector Anděl in the movies Dovolená s Andělem (1952), Anděl na horách (1955), (though both movies include heavy pro communist propaganda, like showing the ideal union of workers at a workers summer resort, where they all rather work together on a kindergarten building then vacation).

== Books ==
He died in 1974 in Prague, with his three books of memorials being published posthumously. These include:

- „Nejen o sobě“ ("Not only about myself") (1975)
- „Jaroslav Marvan vypravuje“ ("Jaroslav Marvan relates") (1975)
- „Herecké eso“ ("Ace Actor") (1995)
