= Sulice =

Sulice may refer to:

- Sulice (Srebrenica), Bosnia and Herzegovina
- Sulice, Czech Republic
- Sulice, Poland
