= Muži v offsidu =

1931 Czechoslovak sports comedy film

- Theatrical release poster
- Directed by: Svatopluk Innemann
- Written by: Josef Neuberg; František Tichý; Vladimír Rýpar
- Based on: Muži v offsidu by Karel Poláček
- Starring: Hugo Haas; Jožka Vanerová; Felix Kühne
- Cinematography: Václav Vích
- Edited by: Svatopluk Innemann
- Music by: Eman Fiala
- Production company: A-B
- Distributed by: Paramount Pictures
- Release date: 11 September 1931
- Running time: 95 minutes
- Country: Czechoslovakia
- Language: Czech

Muži v offsidu is a 1931 Czechoslovak sports comedy film directed by Svatopluk Innemann, based on a novel by Karel Poláček.

== Production ==
Karel Poláček's comedic novel was a bestseller in Czechoslovakia. The movie was made only because there was an open timeslot with no production planned in Barrandov studios that needed to be filled. Director Innemann read the book and the screenplay was finished just a week later. Josef Rovenský was considered for the role of Načeradec, but Poláček insisted his friend Hugo Haas should play the part.

== Cast ==
- Hugo Haas as Richard Načeradec
- Jožka Vanerová as Hedvika Načeradcová
- Felix Kühne as Uncle Ignác Kauders
- Jindřich Plachta as Tailor Emanuel Habásko
- Eman Fiala as Eman Habásek
- Betty Kysilková as Widow Ouholičková
- Theodor Pištěk as Barber Alois Šefelín
- Ella Nollová as Šefelín's wife
- Jiřina Štěpničková as Seamstress Emilka Šefelínová
- Jaroslav Vojta as Antonín Hátle
- Růžena Šlemrová as Fashion salon owner Šmalfusová

== Reception ==
The film was commercially very successful. It was the third most attended film of 1931 in Czechoslovakia after Karel Lamač's Business Under Distress and Ernst Lubitsch's The Smiling Lieutenant. It made Hugo Hass a star overnight.

== Sequel ==
In 1932 a sequel Načeradec, král kibiců was made by Gustav Machatý.
