= Vačkář =

Vačkář, feminine: Vačkářová is a Czech language surname. Notable people with the surname include:

== People ==
- Dalibor Cyril Vačkář (1906–1984), Czech composer
- Václav Vačkář (1881–1954), Czech composer
- Vladimír Vačkář (born 1949), Czech cyclist

== See also ==
- Vackář oscillator, wide range variable frequency oscillator
