= Double Life =

Double Life may refer to:

- Double life, the life led by a person who has an alter ego
- The literal Greek translation of "amphibian"

== Media ==
- A Double Life (1924 film), a Czech film
- A Double Life (1947 film), a film noir
- A Double Life (1954 film), a French-West German drama film
- Double Life (album), a 2002 album by Värttinä
- "Double Life", a song by Styx from Kilroy Was Here
- "Double Life" (The Cars song), a 1979 single
- "Double Life" (Pharrell Williams song), a 2024 song
- "Double Life" (PlayStation ad), a 1999 television advertisement
- Double Life (Invisible Detective), the U.S. title of the first book in the Invisible Detective Series
- Double Life a 2023 film

== See also ==
- Double Live (disambiguation)
