= Father Vojtech (1936 film) =

1936 film

- Directed by: Martin Frič
- Written by: Václav Wasserman; Jan Klecanda
- Produced by: Zdenek Reimann
- Starring: Rolf Wanka
- Cinematography: Jan Kohout
- Edited by: Jan Kohout
- Music by: Eman Fiala
- Production company: AB
- Distributed by: Praga Film Co.
- Release date: 18 December 1936 (Czechoslovakia); 1938 (United States)
- Running time: 84 minutes
- Country: Czechoslovakia
- Language: Czech

Father Vojtech (Czech: Páter Vojtěch) is a 1936 Czech drama film directed by Martin Frič. It is a remake of the 1929 film also called Father Vojtech (Czech: Páter Vojtěch), which in turn was based on the 1902 novel "Páter Vojtěch : vesnický příběh" written by Jan Klecanda. It was released on 18 December 1936 in Czechoslovakia.

== Plot ==
=== Movie adaptation ===
Vojtech's sweetheart Frantina leaves for work in Prague. Vojtech promises his dying mother that he will become a priest. His brother Karel is to inherit the mill. However, he attacks the weak Josífek at the dedication and then flees the village. He hides in a quarry with an unknown vagrant. When a stone is blasted in the quarry, the tramp dies and Karel exchanges his papers for his own.

=== Original 1902 novel ===
The miller, the father of two sons, has one of them (Adalbert) study to become a priest so that he can leave the whole farm to the other son (Karel) in the inheritance. While Vojtěch is studying, Karel commits a violent act, flees the village and joins the army. After returning from the seminary, Vojtěch meets Frantina at home, his secret unfulfilled love from his youth, who in the meantime has become his father's second wife. In his soul, the conflict between his love feelings and his duty to his condition and to his stepmother is raging. Soon Karel, dissolute and heartless, returns and kills Frantina during a scuffle with her father. In the end, Charles dies, Adalbert takes refuge in a monastery to atone for his doubts and the sins of those closest to him and his father examines his conscience.

== Cast ==
- Rolf Wanka as Vojtěch Dvorecký;
- Ladislav H. Struna as Karel;
- Jaroslav Marvan as Dvorecký, mlynár;
- Jiřina Štěpničková as Frantina;
- Ella Nollová as Jozífkova matka;
- Theodor Pištěk as Petr, stárek;
- Josef Příhoda as Mikuska;
- Václav Trégl as Maøánek, policajt;
- František Smolík as Rektor semináře;
- Rudolf Deyl as Biskup;
- František Kreuzmann as Václav Novotný, tulák;
- Alois Dvorský as Starosta;
- Frantisek Hlavatý as Farár Janu;
- Milada Gampeová as Pepička.
