= The Girl from Beskydy Mountains =

1944 film

- Directed by: František Čáp
- Written by: Jan Drda
- Based on: Paprádná nenaříká by Miloslav J. Sousedík
- Starring: Jaroslav Vojta; Marie Nademlejnská; Jiřina Štěpničková
- Cinematography: Ferdinand Pečenka
- Edited by: Jan Kohout
- Music by: Jiří Srnka
- Production company: Lucernafilm
- Distributed by: Lucernafilm
- Release date: 27 October 1944
- Running time: 85 minutes
- Countries: Protectorate of Bohemia and Moravia
- Language: Czech

The Girl from Beskydy Mountains (Czech: Děvčica z Beskyd) is a 1944 Czech drama film directed by František Čáp based on a novel by Miloslav J. Sousedík.

== Production ==
The film was shot in Beskydy Mountains. People of Hážovice, Tylovice and Rožnov pod Radhoštěm lent the actors folk costumes and accessories.

== Cast ==
- Jaroslav Vojta as dřevař Vavruš Cagala
- Marie Nademlejnská as Filoména, Cagala's wife
- Terezie Brzková as Grandmother Cagalová
- Marie Glázrová as Terezka, Cagala's daughter
- Vladimír Salač as Ondra, Cagala's son
- Otomar Korbelář as dřevař Cyril Hanulík
- Jiřina Štěpničková as Heva, Hanulík's wife
- Gustav Nezval as Tomáš, son of Cyril
- Gustav Hilmar as Landowner Zgabaj
- Jiří Dohnal as Pavel, Zgabaj's son
- František Kreuzmann as Landowner Vincek Kapralík
- Vítězslav Vejražka as Francek, Vincek's brother
