= The Lantern (1925 film) =

1925 film

- Directed by: Karel Lamač
- Written by: Karel Lamač
- Based on: Lucerna by Alois Jirásek
- Starring: Theodor Pištěk; Anny Ondra; Karel Lamač
- Cinematography: Otto Heller; Svatopluk Innemann
- Production company: Poja Film
- Distributed by: American
- Release date: 27 November 1925
- Running time: 84 minutes
- Country: Czechoslovakia
- Languages: Silent with Czech intertitles

The Lantern (Czech: Lucerna) is a 1925 Czech film directed by Karel Lamač and starring Theodor Pištěk and Anny Ondra. It is based on a play by Alois Jirásek. Lamač made a remake with the same name in 1938.

== Cast ==
- Theodor Pištěk as Miller Libor
- Anny Ondra as Orphan Hanička
- Karel Lamač as Teacher Josef Zajíček
- Andula Sedláčková as Countess
- Lo Marsánová as Dornička
- Jaroslav Vojta as Carpenter Braha
- Václav Srb as Musician Klásek
- Antonie Nedošinská as Kačenka Klásková
- Ferenc Futurista as Vodník Ivan
- Eman Fiala as Vodník Michal
- Jan W. Speerger as Mr. Franc
