= Thunder in the Hills =

1946 film

- Directed by: Václav Kubásek; Josef Mach
- Written by: František Gotz; Josef Mach
- Produced by: Otakar Sedláček
- Starring: Jaroslav Průcha; Marie Vásová; Miroslav Homola
- Cinematography: Josef Střecha
- Edited by: Josef Dobřichovský
- Music by: Dalibor C. Vačkář
- Production company: Československá filmová společnost
- Distributed by: Státní půjčovna filmu
- Release date: 16 April 1946
- Running time: 79 minutes
- Country: Czechoslovakia
- Language: Czech

Thunder in the Hills (Czech: V horách duní) is a 1946 Czech war drama film directed by Václav Kubásek and Josef Mach and starring Jaroslav Průcha, Marie Vásová and Miroslav Homola. It was shot at the Barrandov and Radlice Studios in Prague and on location around Brno and Svratka. The film's sets were designed by the art directors Štěpán Kopecký and Alois Mecera.

== Synopsis ==
During the Second World War, Czech resistance fighters in a village shelter a downed RAF pilot from the German occupiers. However they begin to fear that they have an informer in their midst.

== Cast ==
- Jaroslav Průcha as Jakub Skýva
- Marie Vásová as Tereza Crhová
- Miroslav Homola as Kurt Sowak
- Theodor Pištěk as Výmola
- Oldrich Lipský as Karel
- Libuše Bokrová as Mayor's Wife
- Terezie Brzková as Rebounová
- Gustav Hilmar as Mayor Suchdolak
- Zdenek Hora as Villager
- Karel Jelínek as Glogar
- Jiří Kačer as Karel Koran
- Eva Klenová as Jelena
- Lubomír Lipský as Josef
- Ota Motyčka as Postman
- Marie Nademlejnská as Javorová
- Vilém Pfeiffer as Javor
- Vladimír Řepa as Vrnata
- Jan W. Speerger as Karel Loukota
- Bohuš Záhorský as Brácha

== Bibliography ==
- Karl, Lars & Skopal, Pavel. Cinema in Service of the State: Perspectives on Film Culture in the GDR and Czechoslovakia, 1945–1960. Berghahn Books, 2015. p. 248.
- Wohl, Eugen & Păcurar, Elena. Language of the Revolution: The Discourse of Anti-Communist Movements in the "Eastern Bloc" Countries: Case Studies. Springer Nature, 2023. p. 348.
