= Řeka čaruje =

1945 Czechoslovak comedy film

The River Is Performing Magic
- Directed by: Václav Krška
- Written by: Václav Krška; Jaroslav Beránek
- Based on: Řeka čaruje (radio play) by Josef Toman
- Starring: František Hanus; Růžena Šlemrová; Evelyna Kinská
- Cinematography: Julius Vegricht; Václav Hanuš
- Edited by: Jan Kohout
- Music by: Jiří Srnka; Josef Stelibský
- Production companies: Nationalfilm; Státní výroba filmů
- Release date: 25 January 1946
- Running time: 96 minutes
- Country: Czechoslovakia
- Language: Czech

The River Is Performing Magic (Czech: Řeka čaruje) is a 1945 Czechoslovak comedy film directed by Václav Krška.

== Cast ==
- František Hanus as Leopold Kohák
- Růžena Šlemrová as Anna Koháková
- Evelyna Kinská as Helena Koháková
- Svatopluk Beneš as Profesor Korejnil
- František Vnouček as Francois
- Karel Dostal as President Šupita
- Meda Valentová as Šupita's wife
- Jaroslav Marvan as Jaroslav Lebeda
- Jindřich Plachta as Čtverylka

== Production ==
Film was shot at Český Šternberk Castle, Lipnice nad Sázavou, Písek, Těšnov train station in Prague, Divoká Šárka, Rataje nad Sázavou, Světlá nad Sázavou quarry, Zvíkov Castle, Havlíčkův Brod, Zruč nad Sázavou, Jílové u Prahy, Ledeč nad Sázavou and Stříbrná Skalice. Filming started in 1944 during Nazi occupation produced by German-run Nationalfilm. After the liberation in 1945 the movie was finished by Československá filmová společnost. Actress Anna Steimarová was replaced by Marie Ježková.
