= Baron Prášil =

Baron Prášil is the Czech name for the historical and literary character Baron Munchausen.

The name may also refer to:

- Baron Prášil (1940), a comedy film starring Vlasta Burian
- Baron Prášil (1962), a film by Karel Zeman
