= Barbora Hlavsová =

1942 film

- Directed by: Martin Frič
- Written by: Jaroslav Havlíček; Karel Steklý
- Starring: Terezie Brzková
- Edited by: Jan Kohout
- Release date: 1942
- Running time: 89 minutes
- Countries: Protectorate of Bohemia and Moravia
- Language: Czech

Barbora Hlavsová is a 1942 Czech drama film directed by Martin Frič.

== Plot ==
Hlavsa, the manager of a small-town pawn shop, commits embezzlement and shoots himself after being unable to get out of the situation. His mother takes in her widowed daughter-in-law and teenage grandson who assist her is paying for all the damage. Young Bořík, a gifted pianist, finds it hard to give up his dreams of being a concert pianist.

== Cast ==
- Terezie Brzková as Barbora Hlavsová
- František Smolík as Vojtech Hlavsa
- Jiřina Štěpničková as Klára Hlavsová
- Jindřich Plachta as Zanta, pensioner
- Jaroslav Průcha as Prouza, city major
- Vladimír Řepa as Kvech, barber
- Stella Májová as Vlasta Kvechová
- František Filipovský as Bartyzal, jeweller
- Karel Dostal as Lukás Hlavsa, carver
- Eliška Kuchařová as Eliska
- Rudolf Hrušínský as Rysavý, miller
- Vilém Pfeiffer as Kaliba
- Eman Fiala as Weaver
- Václav Trégl as Oldrich, weaver
