= František Hanus (actor) =

Czech actor

- Born: 12 May 1916; Valašské Meziříčí, Austria-Hungary
- Died: 2 September 1991 (aged 75); Prague, Czechoslovakia
- Occupation: Actor
- Years active: 1941–1990

František Hanus (12 May 1916 – 2 September 1991) was a Czech actor and occasional voice actor. He appeared in more than 50 films and television shows between 1941 and 1990.

== Selected filmography ==
- Spring Song (1944)
- Saturday (film) (1945)
- Řeka čaruje (1945)
- The Last of the Mohicans (1947)
- Motorcycles (1949)
- We Love (1952)
- Focus, Please! (1956)
