= The Inspector General =

The Inspector General may refer to:

- an alternate title of The Government Inspector, an 1842 play written by Nikolai Gogol
- The Inspector General (1949 film), a comedy based on Gogol's play and starring Danny Kaye
- The Inspector General (1933 film), a Czech historical comedy film based on Gogol's play

== See also ==
- Inspector general
