= The Respectable Ladies of Pardubice =

1944 film

- Directed by: Martin Frič
- Written by: Karel Krpata; Karel Steklý
- Produced by: Vaclav Drazl
- Starring: František Smolík
- Cinematography: Václav Hanus
- Edited by: Jan Kohout
- Release date: 1944
- Running time: 94 minutes
- Country: Czechoslovakia
- Language: Czech

The Respectable Ladies of Pardubice (Czech: Počestné paní pardubické) is a 1944 Czech historical comedy film directed by Martin Frič.

== Cast ==
- František Smolík as Jirí, hangman
- Jiřina Štěpničková as Rozina, Jirí's wife
- Eman Fiala as Adam, groom of hangman
- Ferenc Futurista as Groom of hangman
- Terezie Brzková as Countess
- Marta Fricová as Aninka Drazická, Foster-child
- Zita Kabátová as Helena of Alcantar, adventuress
- Jindřich Plachta as Pálka, reeve
- Jaroslav Marvan as Purknistr
- Gustav Nezval as Prokop Trubka, scribe
- František Filipovský as Flaska, gingerbreadman
- Jára Kohout as Hypolit Kostík
- Meda Valentová as Kostík's wife
- Vilém Pfeiffer as Count Borita of Klokocin
