= Meda Valentová =

Czech film actress

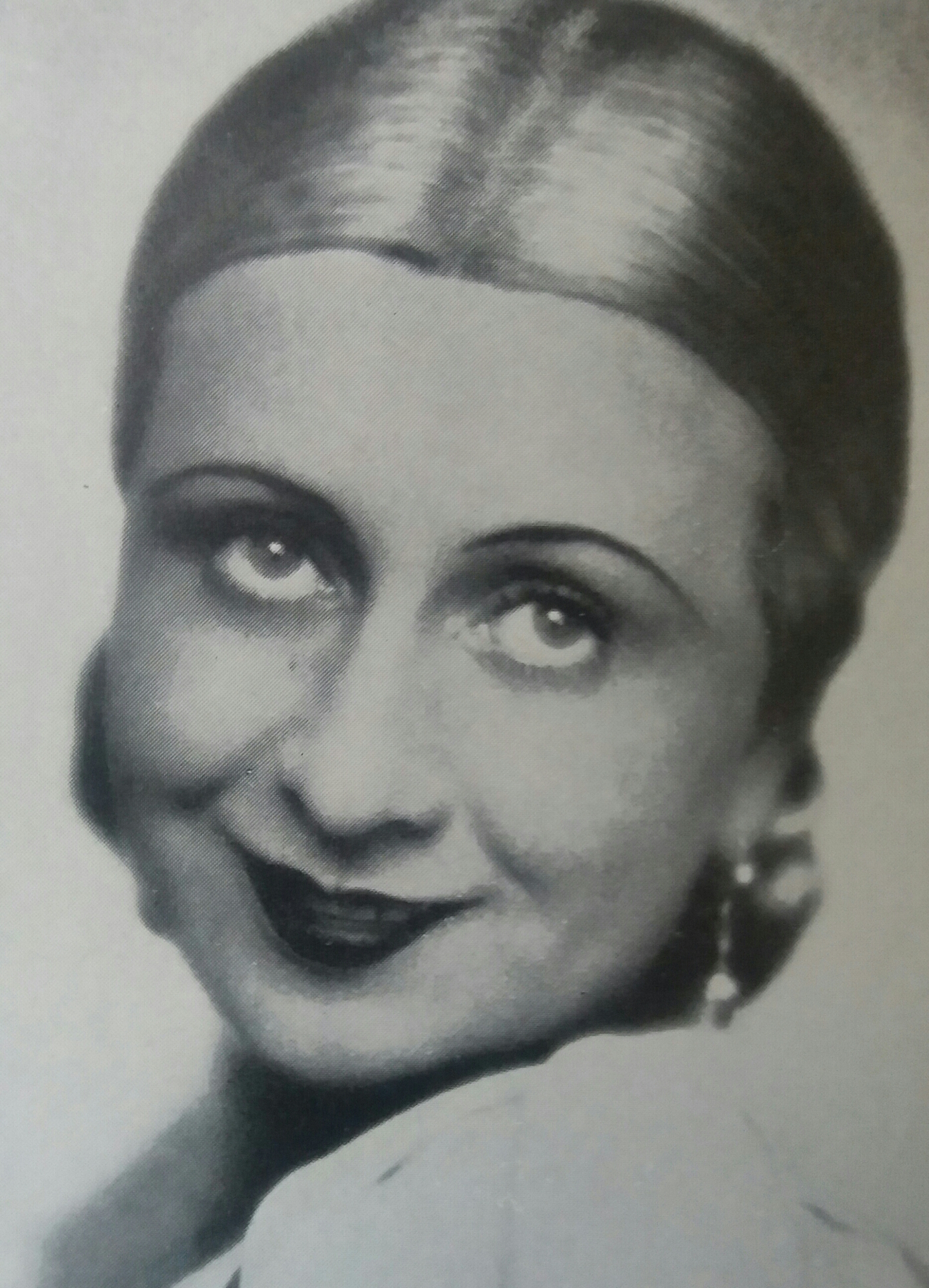
- Valentová in 1932
- Born: 24 May 1898; Prague, Austria-Hungary
- Died: 12 December 1973 (aged 75); Prague, Czechoslovakia
- Occupation: Actress
- Years active: 1925–1972 (film)

Meda Valentová (24 May 1898 – 12 December 1973) was a Czech stage and film actress. She appeared at a number of Czech theatres as well as in cabaret. After making her screen debut in the silent era, she starred in or appeared in supporting roles in comedy films of the 1940s.

== Selected filmography ==
- The Eleventh Commandment (1925)
- Business Under Distress (1931)
- Baron Prášil (1940)
- Ladies in Waiting (1940)
- The Respectable Ladies of Pardubice (1944)
- Just Getting Started (1946)
- Řeka čaruje (1946)
- The Last of the Mohicans (1947)
- No Surgery Hours Today (1948)

== Bibliography ==
- Bartošek, Luboš. Náš film: kapitoly z dějin, 1896-1945. Mladá fronta, 1985. p. 87.
- Goble, Alan. The Complete Index to Literary Sources in Film. Walter de Gruyter, 1999. p. 306.
