= Štěpán Kopecký =

Art director (born 1901)

- Born: 26 August 1901; Prague, Bohemia, Austro-Hungarian Empire
- Died: 8 August 1956 (aged 54); Prague, Czechoslovakia
- Occupation: Art director
- Years active: 1926-1953 (film)

Štěpán Kopecký (1901–1956) was a Czech art director. He designed the sets for more than eighty films during his career.

== Selected filmography ==
- The Inspector General (1933)
- Annette in Paradise (1934)
- Polish Blood (1934)
- Volga in Flames (1934)
- Hero for a Night (1935)
- Grand Hotel Nevada (1935)
- The Eleventh Commandment (1935)
- Delightful Story (1936)
- Port Arthur (1936)
- Three Men in the Snow (1936)
- Cause for Divorce (1937)
- Thunder in the Hills (1946)
- Just Getting Started (1946)
- The Heroes Are Silent (1946)
- Sign of the Anchor (1947)
- Border Street (1948)

== Bibliography ==
- Bergfelder, Tim & Harris, Sue & Street, Sarah. Film Architecture and the Transnational Imagination: Set Design in 1930s European Cinema. Amsterdam University Press, 2007.
