= Václav Trégl =

Czechoslovak actor

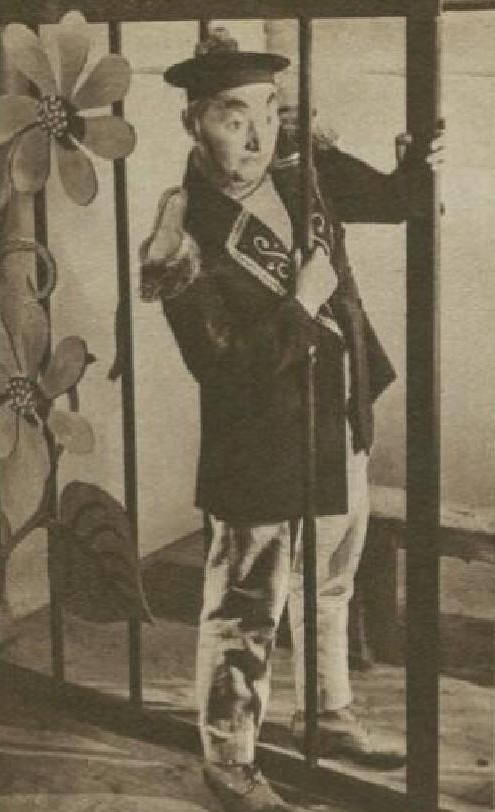
- 1936
- Born: 10 December 1902; Bělá pod Bezdězem, Bohemia, Austria-Hungary (now Czech Republic)
- Died: 11 February 1979 (aged 76); Prague, Czechoslovakia (now Czech Republic)
- Occupation: Actor
- Years active: 1933–1977

Václav Trégl (10 December 1902 – 11 February 1979) was a Czechoslovak film actor. He appeared in more than 120 films between 1933 and 1977.

== Selected filmography ==
- The Inspector General (1933)
- Workers, Let's Go (1934)
- The Last Man (1934)
- The Little Pet (1934)
- Hrdina jedné noci (1935)
- The Eleventh Commandment (1935)
- Long Live with Dearly Departed (1935)
- The Seamstress (1936)
- Father Vojtech (1936)
- Andula Won (1937)
- Krok do tmy (1937)
- Lawyer Vera (1937)
- Ducháček Will Fix It (1938)
- Škola základ života (1938)
- U pokladny stál... (1939)
- Baron Prášil (1940)
- Arthur and Leontine (1940)
- Barbora Hlavsová (1942)
- Just Getting Started (1946)
- Don't You Know of an Unoccupied Flat? (1947)
- The Last of the Mohicans (1947)
- The Emperor and the Golem (1951)
- The Fabulous World of Jules Verne (1958)
- The Fabulous Baron Munchausen (1961)
