= The Eleventh Commandment (1935 film) =

1935 film

- Directed by: Martin Frič
- Written by: Frantisek Ferdinand Samberk; Frantisek Ferdin
- Produced by: Vladimír Kabelík
- Starring: Hugo Haas; Jiřina Štěpničková; Jindřich Plachta
- Cinematography: Otto Heller
- Edited by: Martin Frič
- Music by: Karel Hasler; Milos Smatek
- Production company: Elektafilm
- Distributed by: Elektafilm
- Release date: 30 August 1935
- Running time: 77 minutes
- Country: Czechoslovakia
- Language: Czech

The Eleventh Commandment (Czech: Jedenácté přikázání) is a 1935 Czech comedy film directed by Martin Frič and starring Hugo Haas, Jiřina Štěpničková and Jindřich Plachta. It was shot at the Barrandov Studios in Prague and on location around the city. The film's sets were designed by the art director Stepán Kopecký. It is a remake of the 1925 silent film of the same title in which Haas also starred.

== Synopsis ==
A lawyer who has sworn never to marry is forced to do so when he is accidentally caught in a compromising situation with Emma. After his honeymoon he tries to pretend they are not married when his friends visit.

== Cast ==
- Hugo Haas as Jiří Voborský
- Jiřina Štěpničková as Emma Králíčková Voborská
- Jindřich Plachta as Emanuel Střela
- Jiří Plachý as Miloš Jičínský
- Truda Grosslichtová as Julie Králíčková
- Theodor Pištěk as Florian Králíček
- Milada Gampeová as Veronika Králíčková
- Marie Becvárová as Františka
- Václav Trégl as Bartoloměj Pecka
- Ella Nollová as Eližběta Vaňousová Pecková
- Jára Kohout as Rousek
- Karel Hašler as The Police Captain
- Jaroslav Marvan as Starosta města
- Betty Kysilková as Big Wife at Club Table
- Alois Dvorský as Little Husband at Club Table
- Václav Menger as Drunk at Club Table
- Karel Faltys as Father Time
- Marie Grossová as Miss 1901

== Bibliography ==
- Balski, Grzegorz . Directory of Eastern European Film-makers and Films 1945-1991. Flicks Books, 1992.
