= The Eleventh Commandment (1925 film) =

1925 film

- Directed by: Václav Kubásek
- Written by: František Ferdinand Šamberk; Václav Kubásek
- Starring: Hugo Haas; Meda Valentová; Jiří Hron
- Cinematography: Jaroslav Fischer
- Production company: Astra
- Distributed by: Biografia
- Release date: 23 October 1925
- Running time: 105 minutes
- Country: Czechoslovakia
- Languages: Silent; Czech intertitles

The Eleventh Commandment (Czech: Jedenácté přikázání) is a 1925 Czech silent comedy film directed by Václav Kubásek and starring Hugo Haas, Meda Valentová and Jiří Hron. It was shot at the AB Studios in Prague and on location around the city. The film's sets were designed by the art director Alois Mecera. It was remade as 1935 sound film of the same title with Haas reprising his role.

== Cast ==
- Hugo Haas as Jirí Voborský
- Meda Valentová as Ema Voborská
- Jiří Hron as Prof. Beránek
- František Havel as Major Jičínský
- Jaroslav Vojta as Emanuel Strela
- Josef Vošalík as Bartoloměj Pecka
- Betty Kysilková as Elizbeta Pecková
- Vladimír Majer as Vojtěch
- Alois Charvát as Florián Králíček
- Milka Balek-Brodská as Veronika Králíčková
- Marie Cerná as Julinka
- Marie Fingerová as Františka
- Alois Mecera as Ferdík
- Václav Krejčíř as Ema's Youngest Brother
- Jan W. Speerger as Bugler
- Jan Richter as District Councillman
- Vavřinec Řehoř as Šňupka
- Rudolf Jahelka as Taverner

== Bibliography ==
- Brož, Jaroslav & Frída, Myrtil. Historie československého filmu v obrazech 1898-1930, Volume 1. Orbis, 1959. p. 131.
