= Hero for a Night =

1935 film

- Directed by: Martin Frič
- Written by: Hanns H. Fischer; Peter Francke
- Produced by: Emil Meißner
- Starring: Vlasta Burian; Betty Bird; Theo Lingen
- Cinematography: Jan Stallich
- Edited by: Martin Frič
- Music by: Eman Fiala
- Production company: Meissner Film Prague
- Distributed by: Rota-Film; Kiba Kinobetriebsanstalt (Austria)
- Release date: May 1935
- Running time: 90 minutes
- Countries: Czechoslovakia; Nazi Germany
- Language: German

Hero for a Night (German: Held einer Nacht) is a 1935 Czech-German comedy film directed by Martin Frič and starring Vlasta Burian, Betty Bird and Theo Lingen. It was shot at the Barrandov Studios in Prague. The film's sets were designed by the art director Štěpán Kopecký. A separate Czech-language version Hrdina jedné noci was also produced.

== Cast ==
- Vlasta Burian as Florian Kerzl
- Else Lord as Plaschek, Schneidermeisterin
- Betty Bird as Elvira Thompson & Hanni, ihr Double
- Theo Lingen as Oberlehrer Schneemilch
- Erik Ode as Jantschi, Reklamezeichner
- Max Liebl as Der Bürgermeister
- Herta Rayn
- Karl Padlesak

== Bibliography ==
- Balski, Grzegorz . Directory of Eastern European Film-makers and Films 1945-1991. Flicks Books, 1992.
- Klaus, Ulrich J. Deutsche Tonfilme: Filmlexikon der abendfüllenden deutschen und deutschsprachigen Tonfilme nach ihren deutschen Uraufführungen. 1935. Klaus-Archiv, 1988.
