= Premonition (1947 film) =

1947 film

- Theatrical release poster
- Directed by: Otakar Vávra
- Screenplay by: Otakar Vávra
- Based on: Předtucha by Marie Pujmanová
- Starring: Nataša Tanská; Rudolf Hrušínský; František Smolík
- Cinematography: Jan Stallich
- Edited by: Antonín Zelenka
- Music by: Jiří Srnka
- Production company: Státní výroba filmů
- Distributed by: Státní půjčovna filmů
- Release date: 25 December 1947
- Running time: 90 minutes
- Country: Czechoslovakia
- Language: Czech

Premonition (Czech: Předtucha) is a 1947 Czechoslovak drama film directed by Otakar Vávra and starring Nataša Tanská and Rudolf Hrušínský. The film was screened at 1948 Locarno Film Festival.

The film is an adaptation of Marie Pujmanová's novel Premonition. Originally Miroslav Cikán tried to make the film in 1944 with Jana Dítětová in the main role, but the production was canceled only after a few days of filming. Otakar Vávra re-wrote the screenplay and made his 1947 version with a different cast. František Smolík played the role of the father in both films.

== Cast ==
- Nataša Tanská as Jarmila Jelínková
- Rudolf Hrušínský as Miloš Toufar
- František Smolík as Professor František Jelínek
- Marie Brožová as Anna Jelínková
- Terezie Brzková as Cilka
- Josef Vinklár as Václav Jelínek
- Antonin Mikulic as Ivan Jelínek
- Jaroslav Mareš as Karel
- Alena Kreuzmannová as Máša
- Miloš Vavruška as Miloš
