= Terezie Brzková =

Czech actress

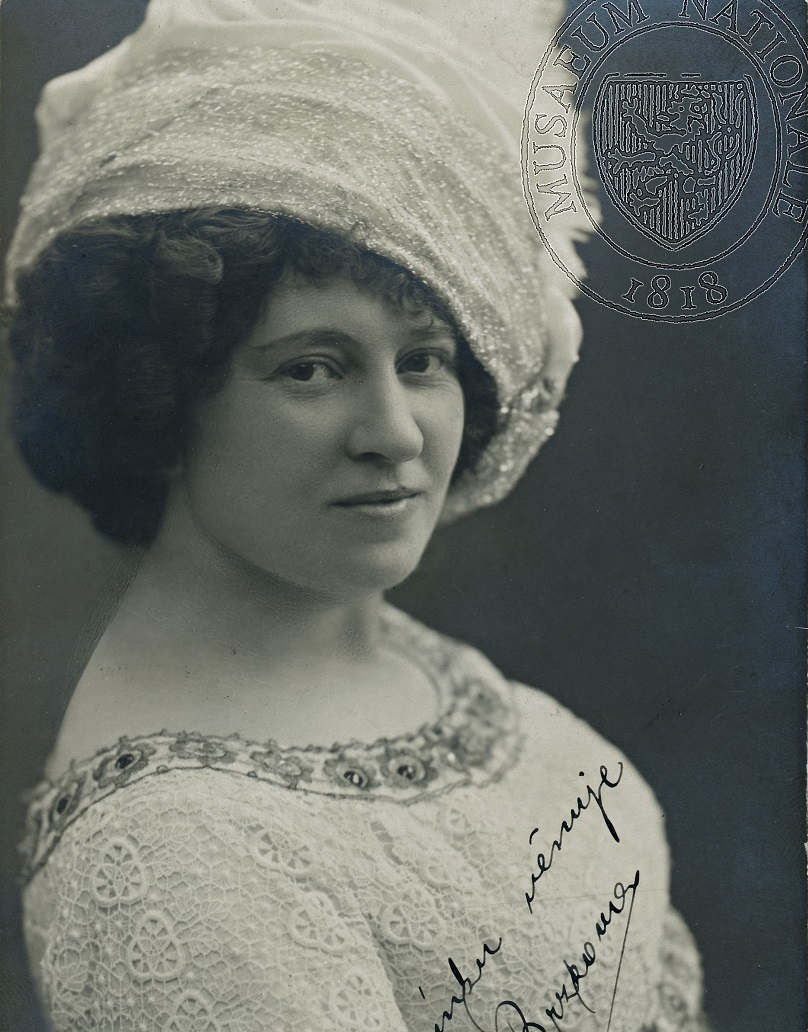
- Born: 11 January 1875; Kolín, Bohemia, Austria-Hungary
- Died: 19 November 1966 (aged 91); Prague, Czechoslovakia
- Occupation: Actress
- Years active: 1939–1959

Terezie Brzková (11 January 1875 – 19 November 1966) was a Czech film actress. She appeared in 28 films between 1939 and 1959. She is buried at the Vyšehrad Cemetery in Prague.

== Selected filmography ==
- The Magic House (1939)
- Grandmother (1940)
- Barbora Hlavsová (1942)
- The Dancer (1943)
- The Respectable Ladies of Pardubice (1944)
- The Girl from Beskydy Mountains (1944)
- Černí myslivci (1944)
- Thunder in the Hills (1946)
- Premonition (1947)
- Lost in the Suburbs (1948)
- Temno (1950)
