= Objev na Střapaté hůrce =

1962 film

- Directed by: Karel Steklý
- Written by: Joseph Picek; Karel Steklý
- Starring: Otomar Korbelář
- Release date: 16 November 1962
- Running time: 69 minutes
- Country: Czechoslovakia
- Language: Czech

Objev na Střapaté hůrce is a 1962 Czechoslovak drama film directed by Karel Steklý.

== Cast ==
- Otomar Korbelář
- Otto Šimánek
- Walter Taub
