= A Step into the Darkness (1938 film) =

1938 film

- Directed by: Martin Frič
- Written by: František Čáp; Eduard Fiker
- Starring: Rolf Wanka
- Cinematography: Otto Heller
- Edited by: Gina Hašler
- Music by: Eman Fiala
- Production company: Lucernafilm
- Distributed by: Lucernafilm
- Release date: 17 February 1938
- Running time: 83 minutes
- Country: Czechoslovakia
- Language: Czech

A Step into the Darkness (Czech: Krok do tmy) is a 1938 Czech criminal-comedy film directed by Martin Frič. The film was dubbed to German and released under the name Schritt ins Dunkel in 1943.

== Cast ==
- Rolf Wanka as Ronny
- Václav Trégl as Valentin
- František Smolík as Jan Haller
- Adina Mandlová as Eva Hallerová
- Zvonimir Rogoz as O.A. Linde
- Alena Frimlová as Linde's lover Magda
- Vítězslav Boček as Fred Baron
- Theodor Pištěk as Filip
- Růžena Šlemrová as Filip's wife
- František Kreuzmann as Josef
