= Gustav Nezval =

Czech actor

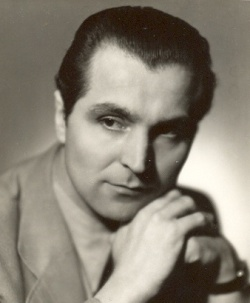
- 1937
- Born: 18 November 1907; Řečkovice, Austria-Hungary (now Czech Republic)
- Died: 17 September 1998 (aged 90)
- Occupation: Actor
- Years active: 1937–1998

Gustav Nezval (18 November 1907 – 17 September 1998) by civil name Augustin Nezval, was a Czech stage and film actor.

== Biography ==
Nezval was born to a locksmith family of Frantisek Nezval and his wife Aloisia. The parents wanted him to become a priest. However he managed to finish a technical college and for some time he earned his living as a building designer. He never attended any school of dramatic art. His enthusiastic passion for theatre brought him to make some acting attempts on the amateurish stage. Later he began to perform in various road show theatre companies. Still later he successively became a stage actor of Intimni Theatre in Prague (1930–1931), of South Bohemia's Theatre in České Budejovice (1931–1932), of Svanda's Theatre in Prague (1932–1934), of Vlasta Burian's Theatre in Prague (1934–1935), of National Theatre in Ostrava (1935–1938), of National Theatre in Brno (1938–1941), and finally of Vinohrady's Theatre in Prague (1941–1977). Even after his retirement in 1977 he still from time to time performed on Vinohrady's stage as a guest-actor till his last and final appearance before the public in 1997.

Thanks to his impressive masculine stature, handsome face with expressive eyes, along with charming manners heightened by a pleasant and resonant voice he, at first, impersonated various lover characters. As he aged, he began to adapt to more various roles, thus starting his career as a classical actor, appearing subsequently in plays of the Czech national literature and the world literature as well (Tyl, Jirasek, Vrchlicky, Langer, Sramek, Capek, Hasek, Sophocles, Lope de Vega, Molière, Flaubert, Strindberg, Rostand, Schiller, Goldoni, Gorkij, Balzac, Lermontov, Pushkin, Tolstoi, Shakespeare, at al).

In July 1937 he married a stage dancer Gertrude Nettel, with whom he lived till her death 57 years later and with whom he had two sons. He had two hobbies which he gave all his free time to. He loved literature and gardening.

He began to appear in films in the end of the 1930s. Nezval made his film debut in a comedy film "Jarcin professor" distributed in 1937. His performance attracted attention of several leading Czech film directors. This resulted in his appearance in many similar films made in a quick succession. One of his most well known films had become "Jan Cimbura", a film based upon a novel of the same name, of one of the nineteenth-century Czech literature classics, J.S. Baar. Shortly after the war he appeared in a title role in the film "Muzi bez kridel, alias Men without Wings, alias Les Hommes sans ailes", which was later honoured by the Golden Palm Award in Cannes Film Festival in 1946. In many films he was a partner of several famous Czech movie star-actresses of that era. One of them was Mrs.Lída Baarová. His last film role, shot in his ninetieth year, was a supporting role in a war drama "Je třeba zabít Sekala, alias Sekal has to die". Altogether he appeared in 52 films between 1937 and 1998.

He appeared in radio and TV as well. Some of these appearances belonged, however, to the beginning of TV broadcasting (in the early 1950s) in Czechoslovakia, and therefore many of them have not been recorded.

Gustav Nezval died on 17 September 1998, at age 90. Seven years after his death, Pavlína Vajčnerova published in 2005 his biography titled Gustav Nezval – oči spíše sympatické.

== Selected filmography ==
- Jarčin professor (dr. Karel Stržický) 1937
- Armádní dvojčata (npor. Zdeněk) 1937
- Děti na zakázku (MUDr. Karel Matys) 1938
- Ideál septimy (ing. Ivan Kareš alias skladatel Michal Martan) 1938
- Dvojí život (povaleč Slaba) 1939
- Osmnáctiletá (Antonín Perný) 1939
- Ženy u benzínu (sedlák Karel Loukota) 1939
- Babička (1940) (Černý myslivec) 1940
- Maskovaná milenka (Leon z Costy) 1940
- Muzikantská Liduška (Toník Jareš) 1940
- Pelikán má alibi (vrchní komisař Moudrý) 1940
- Jan Cimbura (Jan Cimbura) 1941
- Nocturnal Butterfly (npor. Varga) 1941
- Muži nestárnou (lesník Jan Parner) 1941
- The Dancer (princ Maxmilián ze Sylvánie) 1941
- Děvčica z Beskyd (Tomáš Hanulík) 1944
- Počestné paní pardubické (rychtářský písař Prokop Trubka) 1944
- Černí myslivci (1945)
- Men Without Wings (1946)
- Nikola Šuhaj (Nikola Šuhaj) 1947
- Ulica Graniczna (role unknown) 1948
- Vzbouření na vsi (Valenta) 1949
- DS 70 nevyjíždí (dr. Vítek) 1950
- Veselý souboj (mjr. Zahrádka) 1950
- Plavecký mariáš (Šebek) 1952
- Expres z Norimberka (plk. Prokop) 1953
- Ještě svatba nebyla (Francek Gajdoš) 1953
- Nevěra (Lang) 1956
- Legenda o lásce (hvězdopravec) 1957
- Hlavní výhra (číšník) 1958
- Zatoulané dělo (plk. Hanzlík) 1958
- Mstitel (zedník Kryštof) 1959
- Zkouška pokračuje (herec) 1959
- Malý Bobeš (Libra) 1961
- Prosím, nebudit (Petr Parléř) 1962
- Vánice (film) Vánice (chatař na Výrovce) 1962
- Hvězda (film) Hvězda (Roman) 1969
- Velká neznámá (professor) 1970
- Šance (překladatel) 1971
- Dny zrady (dr. Kamil Krofta) 1973
- Sokolovo (mjr. Vrbenský) 1974
- Akce v Istanbulu (Kment) 1975
- Šílený kankán 1982
- Šašek a královna 1987
- Je třeba zabít Sekala (sedlák Štverák) 1998

== Literature ==
- Svatopluk Beneš: Být hercem, Melantrich, Praha, 1992, str. 68
- Jaroslav Brož, Myrtil Frída: Historie československého filmu v obrazech 1930 – 1945, Orbis, Praha, 1966, str. 178–180, 196, 225, 231, foto 465, 466, 471, 473, 474, 518, 615, 636
- Jindřich Černý: Osudy českého divadla po druhé světové válce – Divadlo a společnost 1945 – 1955, Academia, Praha, 2007, str. 168, 292, ISBN 978-80-200-1502-0
- Kolektiv autorů: Dějiny českého divadla/IV., Academia, Praha, 1983, str. 402, 478, 486, 499, 660–1
- Adina Mandlová: Dneska už se tomu směju, vyd. Čs. filmový ústav, 1990, str. 119–121
- Stanislav Motl: Mraky nad Barrandovem, Rybka Publishers, Praha, 2006, str. 68, 130, 166, 235–6, ISBN 80-86182-51-7
- Stanislav Motl: Prokletí Lídy Baarové, Rybka Publishers, Praha, 2002, str. 120, 137, 176, 214, ISBN 80-86182-61-4
- V. Müller a kol.: Padesát let Městských divadel pražských 1907 – 1957, vyd. Ústřední národní výbor hl. m. Prahy, Praha, 1958, str. 179
- František Kovářík: Kudy všudy za divadlem, Odeon, Praha, 1982, str. 259, 349, 350
- Z. Sílová, R. Hrdinová, A. Kožíková, V. Mohylová : Divadlo na Vinohradech 1907 – 2007 – Vinohradský ansámbl, vydalo Divadlo na Vinohradech, Praha, 2007, str. 61, 65, 83, 183, 193, ISBN 978-80-239-9604-3
- Ladislav Tunys: Hodně si pamatuju...Perličky v duši Raoula Schránila, Ametyst, Praha, 1998, str. 120, 132, 181, ISBN 80-85837-35-8
- Ladislav Tunys: Otomar Korbelář, nakl. XYZ, Praha, 2011, str. 104, ISBN 978-80-7388-552-6
- Pavlína Vajčnerová: Gustav Nezval: Oči spíše sympatické, Brána, Praha, 2005, ISBN 80-7243-265-6
- Marie Valtrová: Kronika rodu Hrušínských, Odeon, Praha, 1994, str. 155, 177, ISBN 80-207-0485-X
- Jiří Žák a kol.: Divadlo na Vinohradech 1907 – 2007 – Vinohradský příběh, vydalo Divadlo na Vinohradech, Praha, 2007, str. 192, ISBN 978-80-239-9603-6
