= Temno (film) =

1950 film

- Directed by: Karel Steklý
- Written by: Alois Jirásek; Karel Steklý
- Starring: Otýlie Beníšková
- Release date: 1950
- Running time: 115 minutes
- Country: Czechoslovakia
- Language: Czech
- Budget: 5,330,000 KČs

Temno (Czech "darkness") is a 1950 Czechoslovak drama film directed by Karel Steklý after the novel Darkness by Alois Jirásek.

== Cast ==
- Otýlie Beníšková
- Zdeněk Bittl
- Vítězslav Bocek
- Ladislav Boháč
- Terezie Brzková
- Gabriela Bártlová
- Otto Čermák
- Eduard Cupák
- Rudolf Deyl
- Karel Dostál
- Eman Fiala
