= Eman Fiala =

Czechoslovak actor

- Born: 15 April 1899; Prague, Austria-Hungary
- Died: 24 June 1970 (aged 71); Prague, Czechoslovakia
- Occupation: Actor
- Years active: 1918–1966

Eman Fiala (15 April 1899 – 24 June 1970) was a Czech film actor and composer. He was born in Prague, Austria-Hungary (now the Czech Republic). He appeared in more than 160 films between 1918 and 1966.

== Selected filmography ==
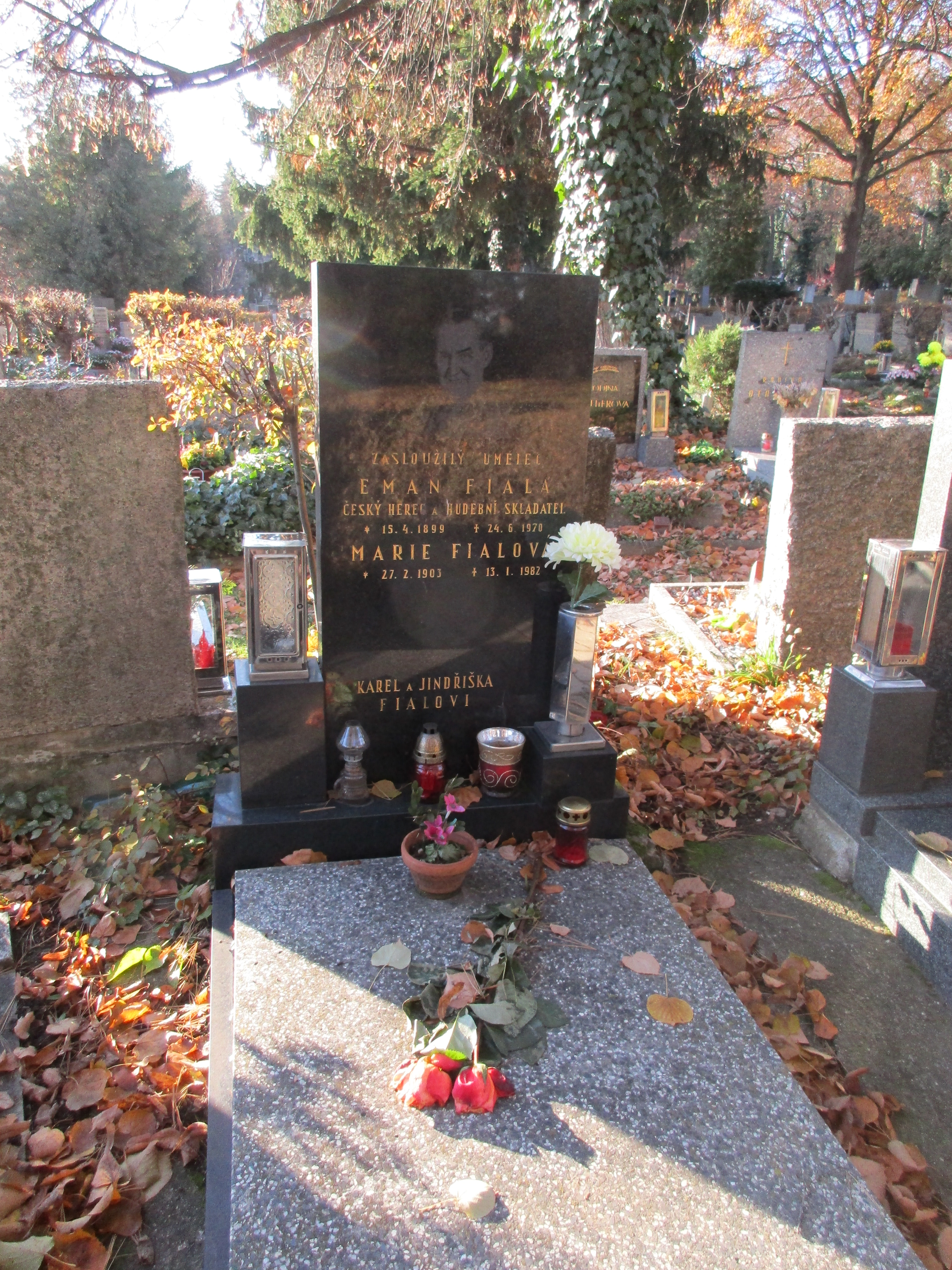
Grave of Eman Fiala at the Malvazinky Cemetery in Prague

- Little Red Riding Hood (1920)
- Tu ten kámen (1923)
- The Lantern (1925)
- Affair at the Grand Hotel (1929)
- Father Vojtech (1929)
- Černé oči, proč pláčete...? (1930)
- Imperial and Royal Field Marshal (1930)
- Chudá holka (1930)
- Business Under Distress (1931)
- Muži v offsidu (1931)
- The Inspector General (1933)
- Hrdinný kapitán Korkorán (1934)
- Hrdina jedné noci (1935)
- Hero for a Night (1935)
- The Lantern (1938)
- Second Tour (1939)
- Muzikantská Liduška (1940)
- Barbora Hlavsová (1942)
- Valentin the Good (1942)
- The Respectable Ladies of Pardubice (1944)
- The Wedding Ring (1944 – music)
- The Heroes Are Silent (1946)
- Just Getting Started (1946)
- The Avalanche (1946)
- Nobody Knows Anything (1947)
- The Last of the Mohicans (1947)
- A Kiss from the Stadium (1948)
- The Poacher's Foster Daughter or Noble Millionaire (1949)
- Temno (1950)
- May Events (1951)
- Hvězda jede na jih (1958)
- Lemonade Joe (1964)
