= Ladies in Waiting (film) =

- Svatopluk Beneš and Zorka Janů
- Directed by: Vladimír Borský
- Written by: F.X. Svoboda (play); Vladimír Borský
- Starring: Zorka Janů; Meda Valentová; Anna Letenská
- Cinematography: Jan Roth
- Edited by: Antonín Zelenka
- Music by: E. F. Burian
- Production company: Terra Film
- Distributed by: Terra Film
- Release date: 5 April 1940
- Running time: 93 minutes
- Country: Czechoslovakia
- Language: Czech

Ladies in Waiting (Czech: Čekanky) is a 1940 Czech romantic comedy film directed by Vladimír Borský. The film sets were designed by the art director Jan Zázvorka.

== Cast ==
- Zorka Janů as Jiřina Krátká
- Meda Valentová as Kristina
- Anna Letenská as Marie
- Marie Nademlejnská as Jitka
- František Smolík as Pilníček
- Ladislav Pešek as Ráček
- Jiří Steimar as Baron
- František Kreuzmann as Old count
- Svatopluk Beneš as Vojtěch Plichta
- Vladimír Řepa as Josef Ptáček
- Ferenc Futurista as Clerk Hřídelíček
- Jára Kohout as Clerk Hlavín
- Ota Motyčka as Clerk Skokan
- František Roland as Poklasný
- Vlasta Matulová as Toninka, Ráček's bride
- Vítězslav Boček as Myslivecký mládenec
