= Marie Nademlejnská =

Czech actress

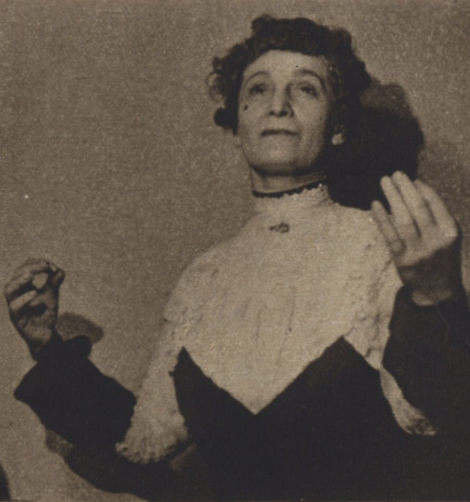
- Born: 27 June 1896; Prague, Austria-Hungary
- Died: 24 January 1974 (aged 77); Prague, Czechoslovakia
- Occupation: Actress
- Years active: 1929–1969

Marie Nademlejnská (27 June 1896 – 24 January 1974) was a Czech actress. She starred in the 1969/1970 film Witchhammer under director Otakar Vávra.

== Selected filmography ==
- Ladies in Waiting (1940)
- The Girl from Beskydy Mountains (1944)
- Thunder in the Hills (1946)
