= The Hard Life of an Adventurer =

1941 film

- Directed by: Martin Frič
- Written by: Josef Gruss; Karel Steklý
- Produced by: Otakar Sedlacek
- Starring: Otomar Korbelář
- Cinematography: Jaroslav Blazek
- Edited by: Jan Kohout
- Release date: 1941
- Running time: 89 minutes
- Country: Czechoslovakia
- Language: Czech

The Hard Life of an Adventurer (Czech: Těžký život dobrodruha) is a 1941 Czech crime-comedy film directed by Martin Frič.

== Cast ==
- Otomar Korbelář as Fred Flok alias Konzul Binder alias Komisar Niklas alias Ing. Benda
- Ladislav Pešek as Karel Kryspín alias Charles Crispin
- Adina Mandlová as Helena Rohanová
- Jaroslav Marvan as Tichý, policejní inspektor
- Karel Dostal as Dr. Seidl
- Karel Cerný as Antonín Bures (as K.V. Cerný)
- Vladimír Repa as Pokladník
- Karel Hradilák as Karel
- Rudolf Hrušínský as Lupic
- R. A. Dvorský as Singer
- František Filipovský as Starik
