= We Love (film) =

1952 film

- Directed by: Václav Kubásek
- Written by: Václav Kubásek; Jaroslav Novotný
- Produced by: Rudolf Hájek; Ladislav Terš
- Starring: František Peterka; Jaroslav Průcha; Jarmila Krulišová
- Cinematography: Jaromír Holpuch
- Edited by: Jan Kohout
- Music by: Dalibor C. Vačkář
- Production company: Československá filmová společnost
- Distributed by: Československý státní film
- Release date: 12 September 1952
- Running time: 89 minutes
- Country: Czechoslovakia
- Language: Czech

We Love (Czech: Milujeme) is a 1952 Czech drama film directed by Václav Kubásek and starring František Peterka, Jaroslav Průcha and Jarmila Krulišová. It was shot at the Barrandov and Hostivař Studios in Prague and on location around Kladno, Ostrava and Libušín. The film's sets were designed by the art director Alois Mecera. It reflected the ideology of the ruling Communist Party and the Stalin-era aesthetic of socialist realism.

== Synopsis ==
At a boarding school for mining apprentices, some of the students are able to thwart a plot by saboteurs to flood a new shaft being dug to enlarge a coal mine.

== Cast ==
- František Peterka as Vojta Gavrecký
- Jaroslav Průcha as Marec - head of school hostel
- Jarmila Krulišová as Mirka
- Frantisek Hanuš as Ing. Lauda
- Vladimír Hlavatý as Ing. František Hruzek
- Oldřich Lukeš as Barvík
- Vilém Besser as Tonda Vrubel - apprentice
- Lumír Blahník as Franta Gavlas - apprentice
- Jiří Bruder as Apprentice Hilar
- František Miroslav Doubrava as Policeman
- Zdeněk Duss as Hilen
- Arnošt Faltýnek as Grandfather Vrubel
- Stanislav Fišer as Jiří Jedlička - apprentice
- Antonín Holzinger as Teacher of dance
- Jana Hrdličková as Jitka
- František Kovářík as Grandfather Gavrecký
- Zdeněk Kryzánek as Bürger
- Radovan Lukavský as Commisar SNB
- Antonín Mikulič as Pepík Zifka - apprentice
- Hynek Němec as Stach
- Václav Neužil Sr. as Stefan
- Radim Nikodém as Petr Zajonc - apprentice
- Jaroslav Oliverius as Apprentice Slávek
- Jaroslav Orlický as Policeman
- Václav Švec as Innkeeper
- Vera Vachová as Secretary
- Jaroslav Vojta as Mineworker Saladyga

== Bibliography ==
- Černík, Jan. Český technický scénář 1945–1962. Palacký University Olomouc, 2021. p. 154.
- Duijzings, Ger & Dušková, Lucie. Working At Night: The Temporal Organisation of Labour Across Political and Economic Regimes. Walter de Gruyter, 2022
