= Sulice, Czech Republic =

Sulice
- Municipality
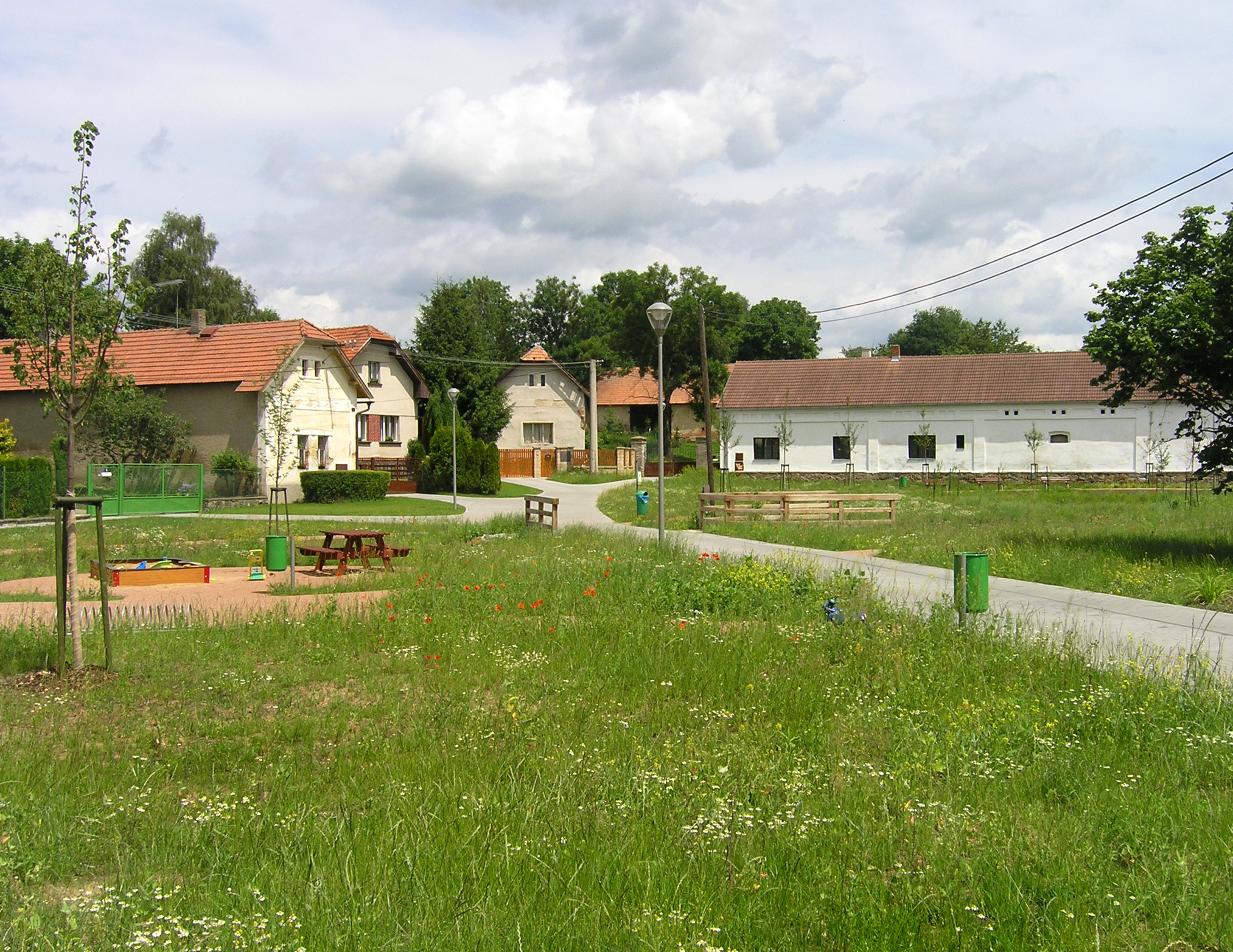
- Centre of Sulice

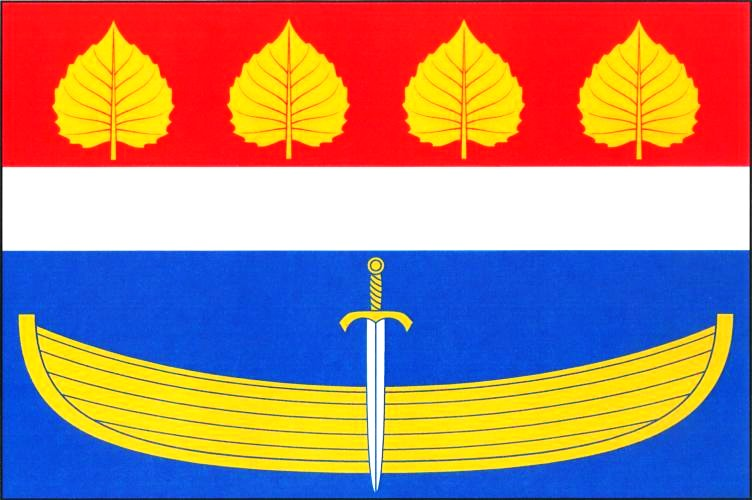
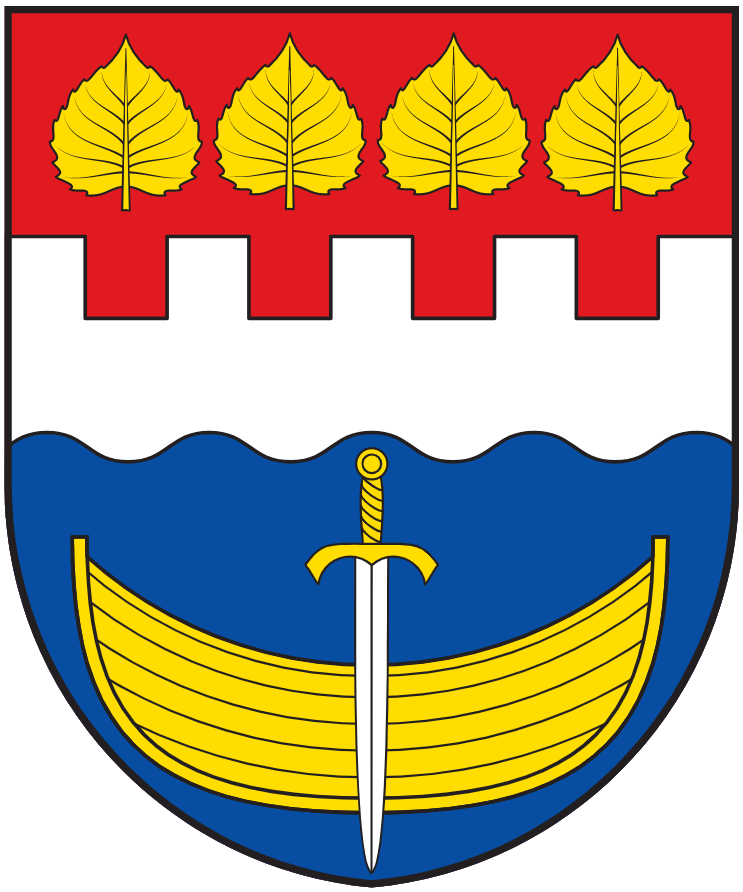
- Flag Coat of arms

- Location in the Czech Republic
- Coordinates: 49°55′33″N 14°33′24″E
- Country: Czech Republic
- Region: Central Bohemian
- District: Prague-East
- First mentioned: 1282

Area
  - Total: 9.92 km^{2} (3.83 sq mi)
- Elevation: 445 m (1,460 ft)

Population (2026-01-01)
  - Total: 2,716
  - Density: 274/km^{2} (709/sq mi)
- Time zone: UTC+1 (CET)
  - Summer (DST): UTC+2 (CEST)
- Postal code: 251 68
- Website: www.obecsulice.cz

Sulice is a municipality and village in Prague-East District in the Central Bohemian Region of the Czech Republic. It has about 2,700 inhabitants.

== Administrative division ==
Sulice consists of four municipal parts (in brackets population according to the 2021 census):

- Sulice (305)
- Hlubočinka (895)
- Nechánice (313)
- Želivec (959)

== Geography ==
Sulice is located about 12 kilometres (7 mi) south of Prague. It lies in the Benešov Uplands. The highest point is the hill Mandava at 480 m (1,575 ft) above sea level. There are several small fishponds in the municipal territory.

== History ==
The first written mention of Sulice is from 1282. Nechánice was first mentioned in 1349 and Želivec in 1402. Until the end of the 17th century, Sulice was owned by various lower noblemen. After 1696, Sulice was annexed to the Dobřejovice estate, which remained so until the establishment of an independent municipality in 1849.

== Demographics ==
Historical population

| Year | Pop. | ±% |
|---|---|---|
| 1869 | 555 | — |
| 1880 | 579 | +4.3% |
| 1890 | 510 | −11.9% |
| 1900 | 537 | +5.3% |
| 1910 | 606 | +12.8% |

| Year | Pop. | ±% |
|---|---|---|
| 1921 | 568 | −6.3% |
| 1930 | 556 | −2.1% |
| 1950 | 590 | +6.1% |
| 1961 | 558 | −5.4% |
| 1970 | 514 | −7.9% |

| Year | Pop. | ±% |
|---|---|---|
| 1980 | 512 | −0.4% |
| 1991 | 492 | −3.9% |
| 2001 | 708 | +43.9% |
| 2011 | 1,560 | +120.3% |
| 2021 | 2,472 | +58.5% |

Source: Censuses

== Transport ==
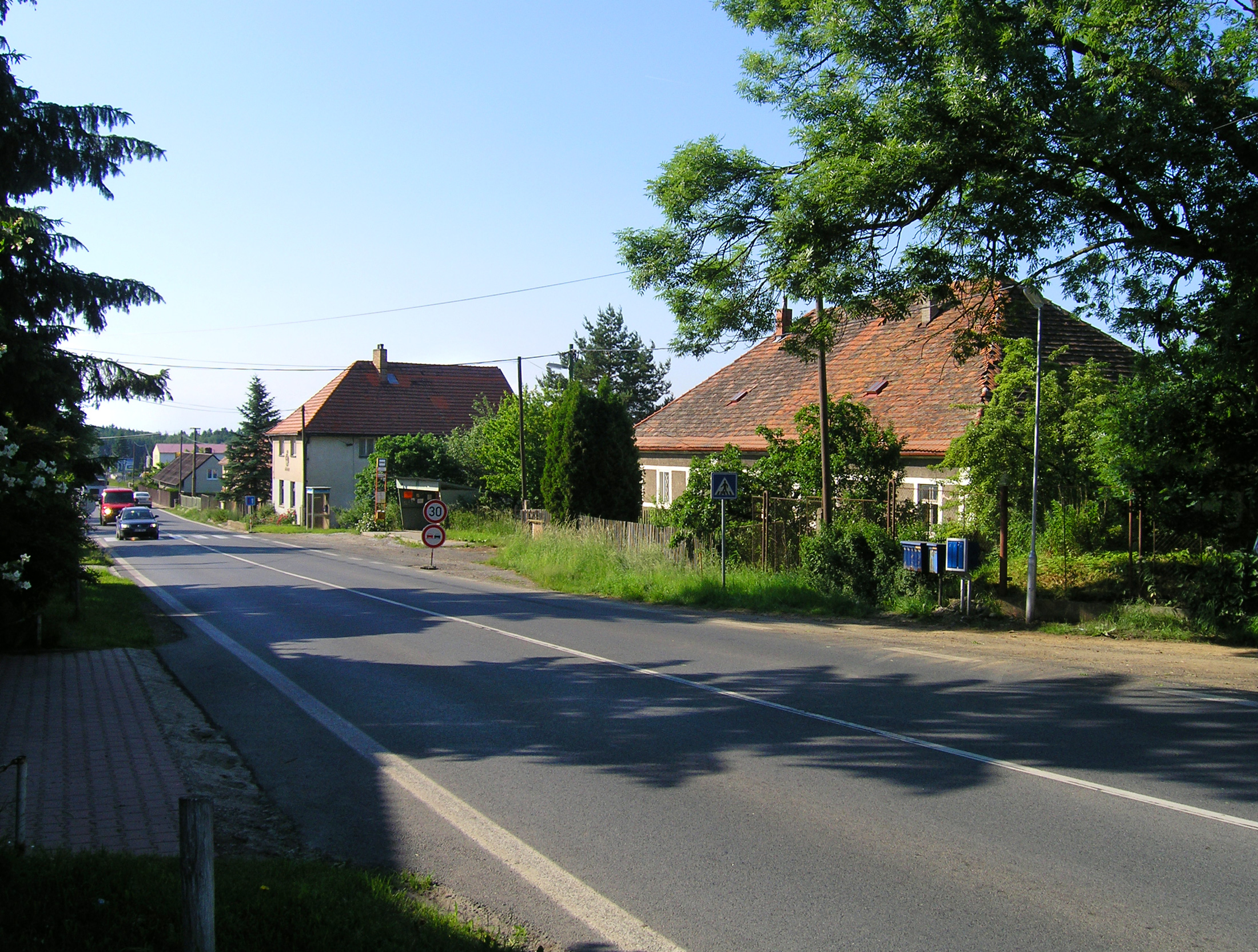
The village of Hlubočinka

There are no railways or major roads passing through the municipality.

== Sights ==
On the Mandava hill is a concrete monument to Jan Hus from 1931, which also includes a 12 m (39 ft) high observation tower.
