= The Last of the Mohicans (1947 film) =

Czech comedy film

- Directed by: Vladimír Slavínský
- Written by: Josef Hlavác; Jaroslav Mottl
- Based on: The Last Man by F.X. Svoboda
- Produced by: Bohumil Smída
- Starring: Jaroslav Marvan; Meda Valentová; Sona Cervená
- Cinematography: Jaromír Holpuch; Josef Strecha
- Music by: Milos Smatek
- Production company: Ceskoslovenský Státní Film
- Distributed by: Ceskoslovenský Státní Film
- Release date: 5 August 1947
- Running time: 89 minutes
- Country: Czechoslovakia
- Language: Czech

The Last of the Mohicans (Czech: Poslední mohykán) is a 1947 Czech comedy film directed by Vladimír Slavínský and starring Jaroslav Marvan, Meda Valentová and Sona Cervená. It was shot at the Barrandov Studios in Prague. The film's sets were designed by the art director Karel Skvor. It was based on a play by F.X. Svoboda which had previously been adapted into the 1934 film The Last Man.

== Synopsis ==
A wealthy antique dealer rules his family with iron discipline and believes in doing things the old fashioned way, without regard for his family's own views or feelings. However, the prospective husband of his daughter manages to turn the tables on him.

== Cast ==
- Jaroslav Marvan as Borivoj Kohout / Jaroslav Kohout
- Meda Valentová as Borivoj's wife
- Sona Cervená as Helena
- Jaroslav Mares as Jaroslav
- Eman Fiala as Antonín
- Dagmar Frýbortová as Zdenka
- Oldrich Slaný as Dr. Marek
- Frantisek Stach as Lékar
- Frantisek Hanus as ing. Becvár
- Jindra Hermanová as Train Passenger
- Rudolf Hrusínský as Návstevník u starozitníka
- Václav Landa as Krotitel selmy
- Frantisek Paul as Clen spolku na ochranu zvírat
- Valja Petrova as Lady with a dog
- Olga Príhodová as Lady with a cat
- Josef Chvalina
- Karel Effa as
- Antonín Jirsa
- Jan S. Kolár
- Alena Kreuzmannová
- Bohumil Langer
- Ota Motycka
- Rudolf Princ
- Jaroslav Seník
- Blazena Slavícková
- Josef Steigl
- Václav Trégl
- Milos Vavruska
- Jirí Vondrovic
- Bedrich Vrbský
- Erik Zámis

== Bibliography ==
- Černík, Jan. Český technický scénář 1945–1962. Palacký University Olomouc, 2021.
- Wohl, Eugen & Păcurar, Elena. Language of the Revolution: The Discourse of Anti-Communist Movements in the "Eastern Bloc" Countries: Case Studies. Springer Nature, 2023.
