= Arthur and Leontine =

1940 film

- Directed by: Miroslav Josef Krnanský
- Written by: Ignát Herrmann (novel); Miroslav Josef Krnanský; Karel Melísek
- Starring: Jiří Dohnal; Lída Baarová; František Smolík
- Cinematography: Jan Roth
- Edited by: Marie Bourová
- Music by: Josef Stelibský
- Production company: Nationalfilm
- Distributed by: Nationalfilm
- Release date: 16 August 1940
- Countries: Protectorate of Bohemia and Moravia
- Language: Czech

Arthur and Leontine (Czech: Artur a Leontýna) is a 1940 Czech comedy film directed by Miroslav Josef Krnanský and starring Jiří Dohnal, Lída Baarová and František Smolík.

The film's sets were designed by the art director Jan Zázvorka.

It was made during the German occupation of Czechoslovakia.

== Plot ==
A wealthy playboy leads an irresponsible life until he meets an attractive and hard-working woman who leads him to transform his ways.

== Main cast ==
- Jiří Dohnal as Artur Drmola
- Lída Baarová as Leontýna Sobotová
- František Smolík as Jakub Drmola
- Zdeňka Baldová as Márinka Drmolová
- Theodor Pištěk as Alexandr Sobota
- Jaromíra Pacová as Sobotová
- Zita Kabátová as Klárka
- Bedřich Veverka as Bohousek
- Josef Gruss as Karel
- Stella Májová as Dolfi
- František Paul as Procurist
- Hermína Vojtová as Fanynka
- Marie Norrová as Katynka
- Václav Trégl as Karásek, servant
- František Kovařík as Fidrmuc
- Vlasta Hrubá as Terinka
- František Černý as Speaker

== Bibliography ==
- Bock, Hans-Michael & Bergfelder, Tim. The Concise CineGraph. Encyclopedia of German Cinema. Berghahn Books, 2009.
- Burianová Miroslava. Móda v ulicích protektorátu. Grada Publishing, 2013.
