= Ferenc Futurista =

Czechoslovak actor (1891–1947)

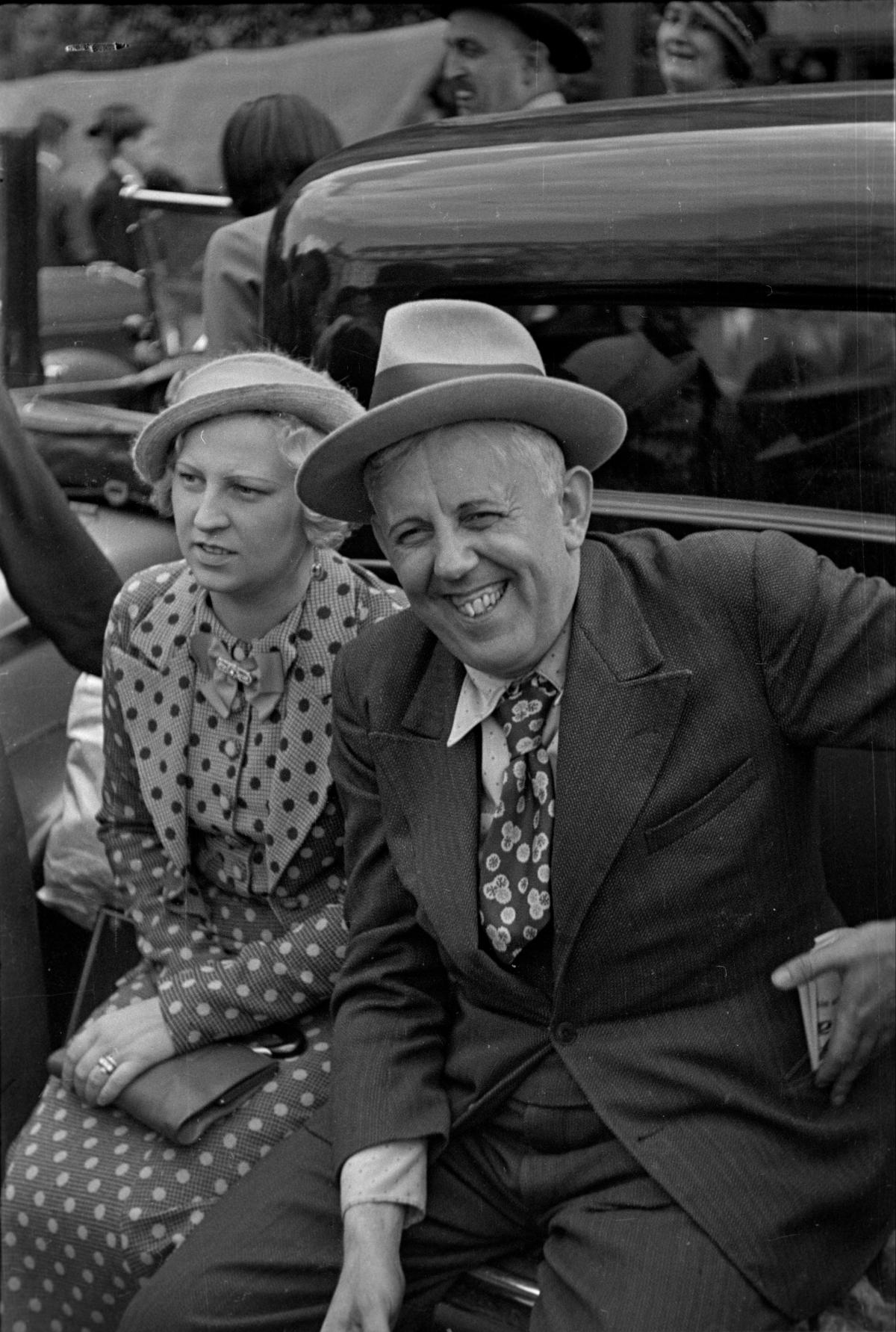
- Born: 7 December 1891; Smíchov, Austria-Hungary (now Czech Republic)
- Died: 19 June 1947 (aged 55); Prague, Czechoslovakia (now Czech Republic)
- Occupation: Actor
- Years active: 1918-1945

Ferenc Futurista, born as František Fiala (7 December 1891 – 19 June 1947) was a Czechoslovak film actor. He appeared in more than 45 films between 1918 and 1945.

== Selected filmography ==
- Tu ten kámen (1923)
- The Lantern (1925)
- The Lantern (1938)
- The Doll (Panenka, 1938)
- Cesta do hlubin študákovy duše (1939)
- Muzikantská Liduška (1940)
- Ladies in Waiting (1940)
- The Blue Star Hotel (1941)
- A Charming Man (1941)
- Auntie's Fantasies (1941)
- The Respectable Ladies of Pardubice (1944)
- The Wedding Ring (1944)
