= Tu ten kámen =

1923 film

- Directed by: Karl Anton
- Written by: Karl Anton
- Cinematography: Otto Heller
- Production company: Anton
- Distributed by: Julius Schmitt
- Release date: 7 September 1923
- Country: Czechoslovakia
- Languages: Silent with Czech intertitles

Tu ten kámen (full name:Tu ten kámen aneb Kterak láskou možno v mziku vzplanout třeba k nebožtíku) is a 1923 Czechoslovak comedy film directed by Karl Anton. The movie is considered lost.

== Cast ==
- Vlasta Burian as Fridolín
- Ferenc Futurista as Egyptologist Rapapides Bulva
- Josef Rovenský as Mayor of Zelená Lhota
- Josef Šváb-Malostranský as Cheesemonger
- Eman Fiala as Ne'er-do-well / Fake Egyptologist
- Karel Lamač as Drtichlup
- Anny Ondra as Aenny (as Anny Ondráková)
- Martin Frič as Quartet Singer
- Rolf Passer as Miloš
- Karel Schleichert as Town Councillor
- Frantisek Beranský as Quartet Singer
- Jan W. Speerger
