= Double Live =

Double Live may refer to:

- Double Live (Butthole Surfers album), 1989
- Double Live (Garth Brooks album) 1998
- Double Live (Rheostatics album), 1997
- Double Live (Yngwie Malmsteen album), 1998
- Double Live, an album by Clipping with Christopher Fleeger, 2020
- Double Live, an album by Starz, 2006

== See also ==
- Double Live Gonzo!, an album by Ted Nugent, 1978
- Double Live @ Long Wong's, an album by Stephen Ashbrook, 2004
- Double Life (disambiguation)
