= František Peterka =

Czech actor

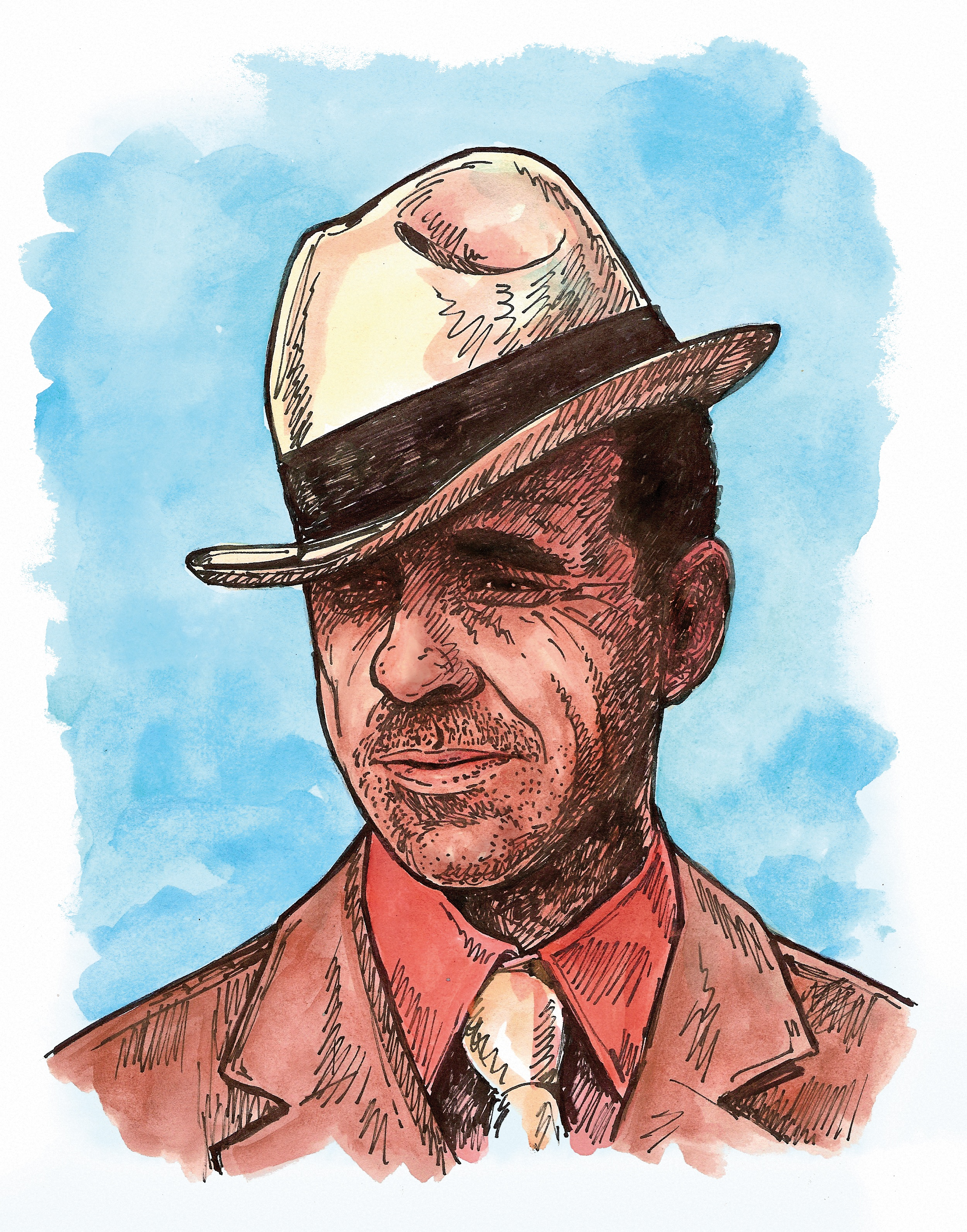
- Born: 17 March 1922; Prague, Czechoslovakia
- Died: 25 November 2016 (aged 94); Liberec, Czech Republic
- Occupation: Actor
- Years active: 1950–1994 (film & TV)

František Peterka (17 March 1922 – 25 November 2016) was a Czech actor.

== Selected filmography ==
- The Great Opportunity (1950)
- We Love (1952)
- Únos (1953)
- Botostroj (1954)
- Černý prapor (1958)
- Život pro Jana Kašpara (1959)
- Four Murders Are Enough, Darling (1971)
- Jak dostat tatínka do polepšovny (1978)
- Rendezvous in Paris (1982)
- Shades of Fern (1985)

== Bibliography ==
- Štoll, Martin . Television and Totalitarianism in Czechoslovakia: From the First Democratic Republic to the Fall of Communism'. Bloomsbury Publishing, 2018.
