= Motorcycles (film) =

1949 film

- Directed by: Martin Frič
- Written by: Josef Neuberg; František Vlček
- Starring: František Hanus
- Cinematography: Jan Roth
- Edited by: Jan Kohout
- Release date: 2 September 1949
- Running time: 84 minutes
- Country: Czechoslovakia
- Language: Czech

Motorcycles (Czech: Pětistovka) is a 1949 Czech drama film directed by Martin Frič.

== Cast ==
- František Hanus as Martin Baresch
- Bela Jurdová as Mana Kolarschowa
- Felix Le Breux as Ing. Rokosch
- Vilém Pfeiffer as Kerman
- Robert Vrchota as Tomek
