= Jiný vzduch =

1939 film

- Directed by: Martin Frič
- Written by: Václav Wasserman; Matej Anastazia Simácek
- Produced by: Jan Sinnreich
- Starring: František Smolík
- Cinematography: Jan Stallich
- Edited by: Jan Kohout
- Release date: 13 October 1939
- Running time: 86 minutes
- Country: Czechoslovakia
- Language: Czech

Jiný vzduch is a 1939 Czech drama film directed by Martin Frič.

== Cast ==
- František Smolík as Frantisek Elis
- Zdeňka Baldová as Elisová Zena
- Hana Vítová as Helena
- Ladislav Boháč as Prokop
- František Kreuzmann as Emil Viták
- František Paul as Pavelka
- Bedřich Veverka as Boubela
- Vojta Novák as Professor Vácha
- Oldřich Kovár as Zpevák
