= František Smolík =

Czechoslovak actor

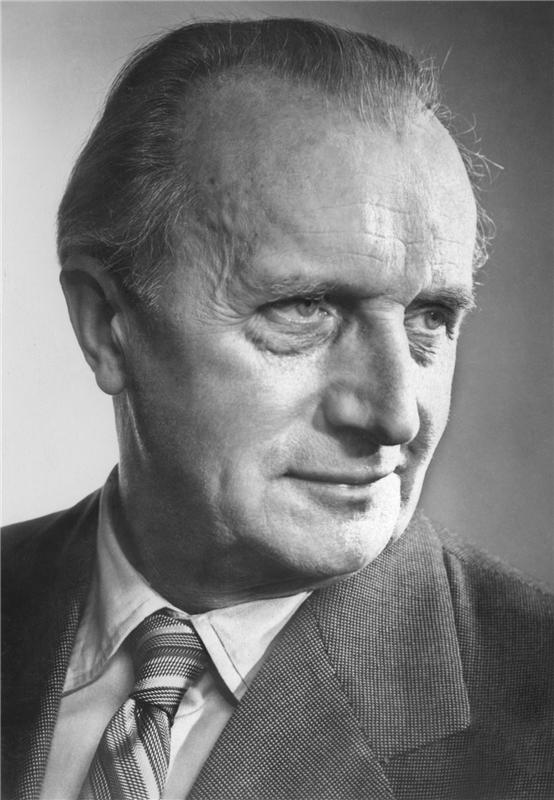
- Born: 23 January 1891; Prague, Bohemia, Austria-Hungary (now Czech Republic)
- Died: 26 January 1972 (aged 81); Prague, Czechoslovakia (now Czech Republic)
- Occupation: Actor
- Years active: 1920–1968

František Smolík (23 January 1891 – 26 January 1972) was a Czechoslovak film actor. He appeared in more than 75 films between 1920 and 1968.

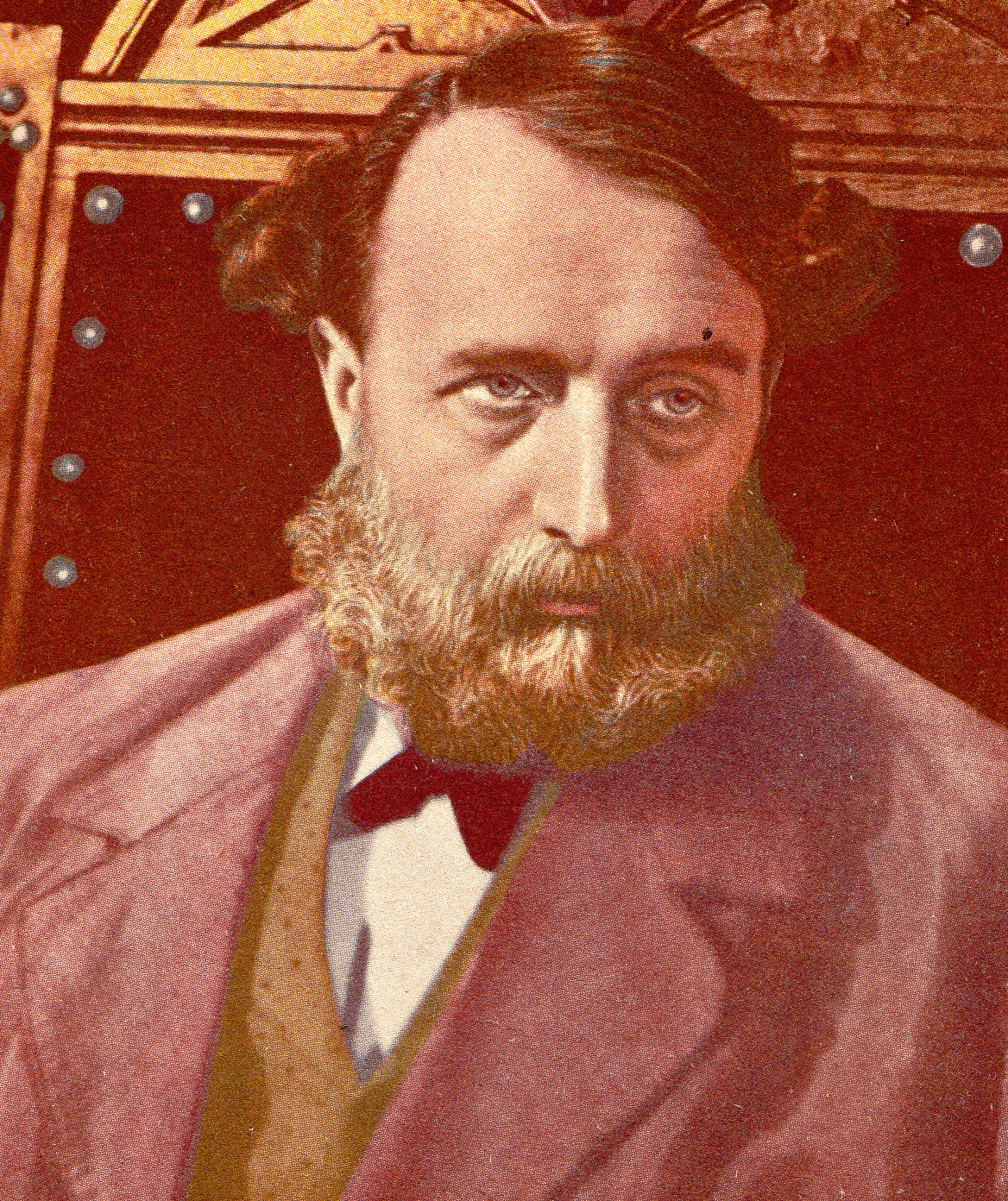
František Smolík in Městečko na dlani (1942)

== Selected filmography ==
- The Mystery of the Blue Room (1933)
- The Ruined Shopkeeper (1933)
- Father Vojtech (1936)
- Lidé na kře (1937)
- Skeleton on Horseback (1937)
- Krok do tmy (1937)
- Škola základ života (1938)
- The Merry Wives (1938)
- Jiný vzduch (1939)
- Arthur and Leontine (1940)
- Ladies in Waiting (1940)
- Auntie's Fantasies (1941)
- Barbora Hlavsová (1942)
- The Respectable Ladies of Pardubice (1944)
- Spring Song (1944)
- The Wedding Ring (1944)
- The Adventurous Bachelor (1946)
- Capek's Tales (1947)
- Premonition (1947)
- Krakatit (1948)
- Lost in the Suburbs (1948)
- Jan Hus (1954)
- Dog's Heads (1955)
- Today for the Last Time (1958)
- Princezna se zlatou hvězdou (1959)
- Escape from the Shadows (1959)
- Higher Principle (1960)
- Ikarie XB-1 (1963)
