= Just Getting Started (1946 film) =

1946 film

- Directed by: Vladimír Slavínský
- Written by: Josef Neuberg; František Vlček
- Produced by: Eduard Šimáček
- Starring: Jaroslav Marvan; Jindřich Plachta; Meda Valentová
- Cinematography: Josef Střecha
- Edited by: Jiří Sobotka
- Music by: Josef Dobeš
- Production company: Československý státní film
- Distributed by: Československý státní film
- Release date: 8 November 1946
- Running time: 99 minutes
- Country: Czechoslovakia
- Language: Czech

Just Getting Started (Czech: Právě začínáme) is a 1946 Czech comedy film directed by Vladimír Slavínský and starring Jaroslav Marvan, Jindřich Plachta and Meda Valentová. It was shot at the Radlice Studios in Prague. The film's sets were designed by the art director Štěpán Kopecký.

== Cast ==
- Jaroslav Marvan as Bohouš Vosáhlo
- Jindřich Plachta as František Diviš, marketer
- Meda Valentová as Sidonie, Vosáhlo's wife
- Josef Kotapiš as Karel Rabas
- Eman Fiala as Eman
- Antonín Mikulič as Pepík Strnad, Diviš's step-son
- Eva Bartáková as Eliška, curious girl
- Ludmila Buresová as Melková, housekeeper
- Václav Trégl as Kacaba
- Slávka Procházková as Koudelková
- Jindra Hermanová as Rabas' fiancee
- Ela Trousilová as Elvíra, snake charmer
- Jindřich Láznička as Sekvenc, joiner
- Vladimír Hlavatý as Josef Havlík, baker
- Ferdinand Jarkovský as clerk of Probate Court
- Eduard Dubský as lawyer
- Bohuš Hradil as representative of the Jetmar shoe company
- Jaroslav Štercl as postman
- Rudolf Deyl as young man with a glue
- Antonín Holzinger as laughing man
- Václav Norman as man with an umbrella
- Vojta Mirko as builder
- Marie Hodrová as old lady
- Felix Prokop as boy
- Oskar Hák as fat boy in the audience
- Antonín Soukup as customer in Benešov
- Ljuba Skořepová as spectator on Death Ride

== Bibliography ==
- Fikejz, Miloš. Český film: herci a herečky, Volumes 1-2. Libri, 2006. p. 418. (in Czech)
