= Václav Kubásek =

Czech film director

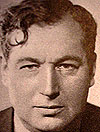
- Born: 3 June 1897; Prague, Austria-Hungary
- Died: 9 June 1964 (aged 67); Prague, Czechoslovakia
- Occupations: Director, screenwriter, actor
- Years active: 1918–1952 (film)

Václav Kubásek (3 June 1897 – 9 June 1964) was a Czech film director, screenwriter and actor.

== Selected filmography ==
- For the Freedom of the Nation (1920)
- A Double Life (1924)
- The Eleventh Commandment (1925)
- A Big Case (1946)
- Thunder in the Hills (1946)
- Old Ironside (1948)
- We Love (1952)
- Young Hearts (1952)

== Bibliography ==
- Hames, Peter. The Cinema Of Central Europe. Wallflower Press, 2004. p. 248.
- Wohl, Eugen & Păcurar, Elena. Language of the Revolution: The Discourse of Anti-Communist Movements in the "Eastern Bloc" Countries: Case Studies. Springer Nature, 2023. p. 356.
