= Grandmother (1940 film) =

1940 Czech film

- Directed by: František Čáp
- Written by: František Čáp; Karel Hašler; Václav Wasserman
- Based on: Babička by Božena Němcová
- Produced by: Vilem Brož
- Starring: Terezie Brzková; Světla Svozilová; Karel Trešňák
- Cinematography: Karl Degl
- Edited by: Antonín Zelenka
- Music by: Jiří Fiala
- Production company: Lucernafilm
- Distributed by: Lucernafilm
- Release date: 15 November 1940
- Running time: 97 minutes
- Country: Czechoslovakia
- Language: Czech

Grandmother (Czech: Babička) is a 1940 Czech drama film directed by František Čáp. This film has been produced by Vilém Brož and music composed by Jiří Fiala.

== Cast ==
- Terezie Brzková as Grandmother
- Světla Svozilová as Terezka
- Karel Trešňák as Jan Prošek
- Nataša Tanská as Barunka
- Jiří Papež as Jan
- Jitka Dušková as Adélka
- Gustav Nezval as Gamekeeper
- Jiřina Štěpničková as Viktorka
