= The Dancer (1943 film) =

1943 film

- Directed by: František Čáp
- Written by: Jan Wenig; František Čáp
- Starring: Marie Glázrová; Jiřina Štěpničková; Růžena Nasková
- Cinematography: Ferdinand Pečenka
- Music by: Roman Blahník; Jaroslav Jeremiáš
- Production company: Lucernafilm
- Distributed by: Lucernafilm
- Release date: 5 November 1943
- Running time: 94 minutes
- Country: Protectorate of Bohemia and Moravia
- Language: Czech

The Dancer (Czech: Tanečnice) is a 1943 Czech historical romantic drama film directed by František Čáp and starring Marie Glázrová, Jiřina Štěpničková and Růžena Nasková. It was shot at the Barrandov and Hostivař Studios in Prague. The film's sets were designed by the art director Jan Zázvorka.

== Cast ==
- Marie Glázrová as Clo
- Jiřina Štěpničková as Marie, Clo's sister
- Růžena Nasková as Mother
- Terezie Brzková as Háta, housekeeper
- Karel Höger as Saša Holberg / Arens
- Josef Belský as Baron Schwarz
- Karel Dostál as physician in Dresden
- Vlasta Fabiánová as Marie Luisa
- Jan Fifka as Director of Vienna Opera
- Nelly Gaierová as singer at Maxim's
- Slávka Hamouzová as girl in company
- Marie Holanová as maid at Clo
- Milada Horutová as visitor of Vienna Opera
- Eduard Kohout as Maras, baron
- Eliška Kuchařová as Maruška
- Viktor Malčev as Karel Höger's dance double
- Jaroslav Marvan as Derman, director of National Theatre
- Miloš Nedbal as Deval, director from Brussels
- Gustav Nezval as Princ Maxmilián
- Jelizaveta Nikolská as Mme Richetti
- Jaroslav Orlický as Maxmilián's butler
- Otakar Pařík as Dirigent
- Václav Pata as waiter at Maxim
- Václav Piskáček as Vienna Opera Spectator
- Jan Pivec as Miloš Borský
- Zdeněk Podlipný as Critic
- Dalibor Pták as visitor of Vienna Opera
- Bohuš Rendl as Sebastian Kubeš
- Vladimír Řepa as Mrs. Satranová's coachman
- Karel Roden as Maxmilián's servant
- Zvonimír Rogoz as maestro Bondini
- Josef Sládek as theatre worker
- Helena Smolová as visitor of Vienna Opera
- Míla Spazierová-Hezká as singer in cabaret Chat Noir
- Jiří Steimar as Vienna Opera director Walter
- Bedřich Veverka as baron Franz von Reiter
- Václav Voska as visitor of Vienna Opera
- Antonín Zacpal as Husar

== Bibliography ==
- Havel, Václav Maria. Mé vzpomínky. Nakl. Lidové noviny, 1993. p. 429
