= Černí myslivci =

1945 film

- Directed by: Martin Frič
- Written by: Růžena Svobodová
- Starring: Terezie Brzková
- Release date: 1945
- Country: Czechoslovakia
- Language: Czech

Černí myslivci is a 1945 Czech drama film directed by Martin Frič.

== Cast ==
- Terezie Brzková
- Dana Medřická as Zofka
- Gustav Nezval as Knizeci myslivec Jiri
- Jaroslav Průcha
