= The Wedding Ring (1944 film) =

1944 film

- Directed by: Martin Frič
- Written by: Josef Neuberg; Josef Hlavác
- Starring: Otomar Korbelář
- Edited by: Jan Kohout
- Music by: Eman Fiala
- Release date: 1944
- Running time: 92 minutes
- Country: Czechoslovakia
- Language: Czech

The Wedding Ring (Czech: Prstýnek) is a 1944 Czech comedy film directed by Martin Frič.

== Cast ==
- Otomar Korbelář as Jan Sochor
- Marie Blazková as Sochorova druhá zena
- Nadezda Vladyková as Sochorova první zena
- Hermína Vojtová as Sochorova první tchyne
- Vlasta Fabianová as Krezna
- František Smolík as Kníze Ferdinand Andres
- Zdeněk Dítě as Robert, mladý kníze
- Jana Dítětová as Baruska Sochorová
- Růžena Šlemrová as Baronka
- Jindřich Plachta as Doktor
- Jaroslav Marvan as Farár
- Vladimír Repa as Lesní
- Ferenc Futurista as Kocí Václav
