= Double Life (advertisement) =

1999 advertisement film for the Sony Playstation

- A screenshot from Double Life
- Agency: TBWA\London
- Client: Sony Europe
- Language: English
- Running time: 60 seconds
- Product: PlayStation
- Release date: 1999
- Directed by: Frank Budgen
- Music by: Zoo Studios, London
- Production company: Gorgeous Enterprises, London
- Produced by: Paul Rothwell (production company), Di Croll (agency)
- Country: International release

Double Life is a television advertisement released in 1999 by SCE Europe. The 60-second long ad – conceived and written by copywriter James Sinclair, art director, Ed Morris and Trevor Beattie (creative director) – shows 19 PlayStation players discussing their gaming experience with the console. The ad was the most highly awarded in the world in 1999/2000 and has gone on to gain cult status.

== Content ==
The ad begins with an English-sounding man in a suit who walks through a busy street. He starts the ad by saying "For years, I've lived a double life. In the day, I do my job – I ride the bus, roll up my sleeves with the hoi-polloi.", then a number of different characters are seen including the same man sitting undressed on a bed with a woman ("But at night, I live a life of exhilaration,"), a woman of Asiatic appearance ("of missed heartbeats and adrenalin."), a middle-aged man on a leather couch ("And, if the truth be known",) with teenage girl who sits down beside him, a young man wearing a hat ("a life of dubious virtue."), a man beside a car, ("I won't deny -") and wearing a scary – looking mask ("I've been engaged in violence, even indulged in it."), a shirtless boy on a skate ramp ("I've assailed adversaries, and not merely in self-defence."), a man in a bathtub ("I've exhibited disregard for life,"), a black man in a wheelchair ("limb"), and the man in the bath again ("and property,"), a "couch potato" ("and savoured every moment."), a person with a deep voice in a corset ("You may not think it, to look of me"), a foreign sounding woman with a shaved head ("but I have commanded armies,"), a preschool child ("and conquered worlds."), a cyclist wearing sunglasses and a scarf over his face ("And though in achieving these things"), an older man with long white hair ("I've set morality aside,"), a topless pregnant woman holding a soundless crying baby ("I have no regrets."), the black man spinning in his wheelchair again ("For though I've led a double life, at least I can say") and finally the first man, in close up ("- I have lived.") before a black screen comes up at the end saying "Do not underestimate the power of PlayStation".

The original ad had a small difference: the line "a life of dubious virtue" was said by the teenage girl, followed in some versions by a black man in athletic clothes making a popping sound with his lips. The girl's entire line was replaced in Sony's official version of the ad during their 2014 #20YearsOfPlay promotion.

== Reception ==
The ad is internationally known (even though, it is a mainly European ad) and many people from the US and Asia have commented on its quality. Scott Steinberg, author of Videogame Marketing and PR and founder of Embassy Multimedia Consultants commented on the ad in 2008, saying

Pure genius, nothing less... From sheer caliber of script to general casting, dialogue, acoustics, camerawork and striking use of both color and imagery, this promotional spot commands the audience's attention like few other videogame ads – or advertisements, period – that've come before. Epic in scope, yet elegantly capturing every man's desire to transcend the boundaries of mundane life, to this day, the piece remains nothing short of iconic... not to mention instrumental in conveying the PlayStation family's inherent scope and value. Watching for the first time, it's near impossible to take your eyes off the screen, even if, upon reflection, the number of half-naked men and face time they're afforded proves slightly disproportionate... and disturbing. Still, it's quite possibly the first and truest example of modern "pull" vs. "push" game marketing in motion: Regardless if you can appreciate the depth of the prose, or simply prefer the promo's off-kilter sense of humor – seriously, is that a real baby or homicidal Cabbage Patch doll? – it's impossible to peel yourself away.

== Legacy ==
Double Life has clocked up over half a million views on YouTube and the ad topped Joystiq.com's "Top 10 Best PlayStation Ads". On 11 May 2007, Double Life was added to the Clio Hall of Fame. Also, the first few lines ("For years, I've lived a double life.") are the first things featured on IGN's podcasts. A small screenshot of the ad was featured in The Guinness World Records Gamer's Edition.
