= Dobřejovice =

- Municipality
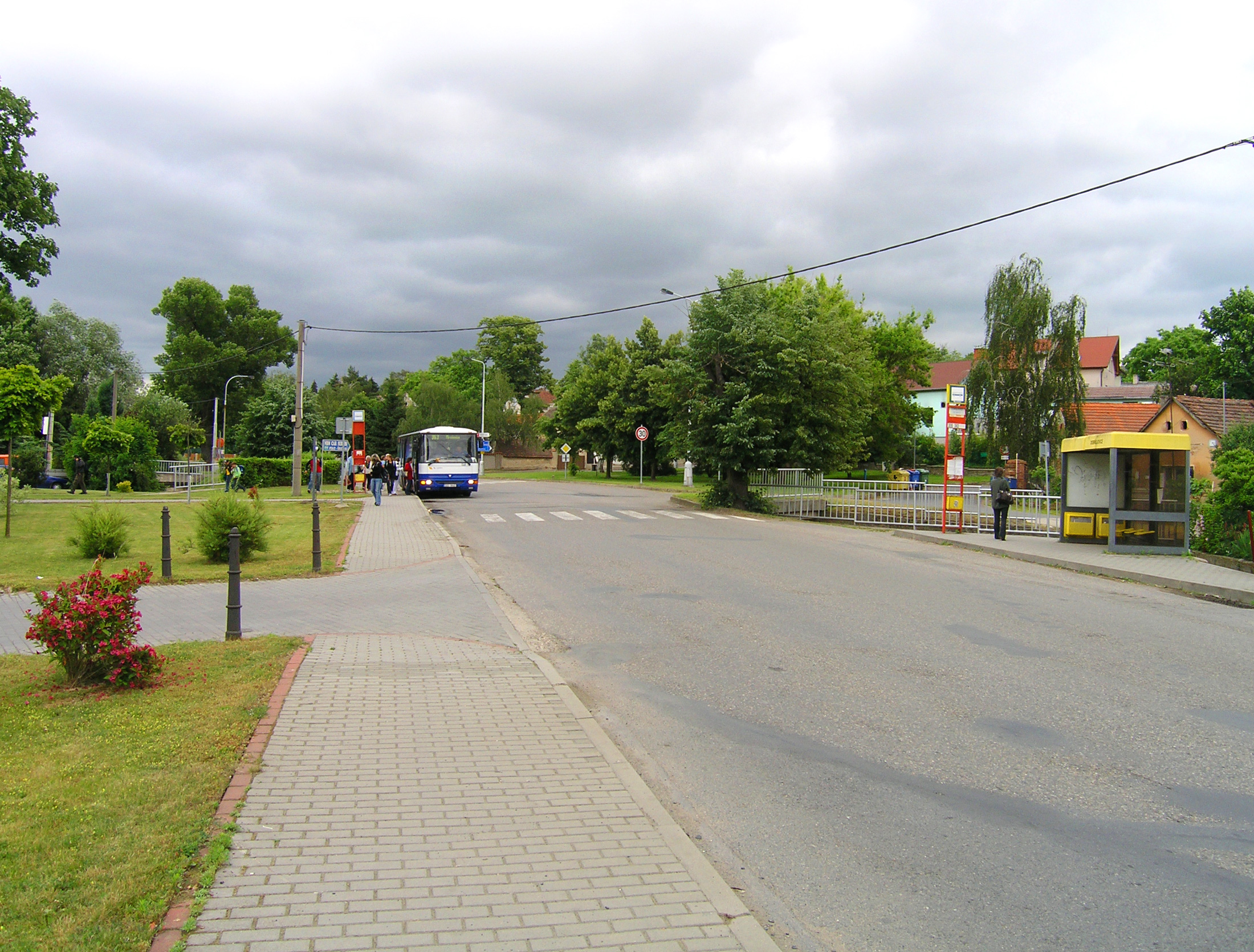
- Centre of Dobřejovice

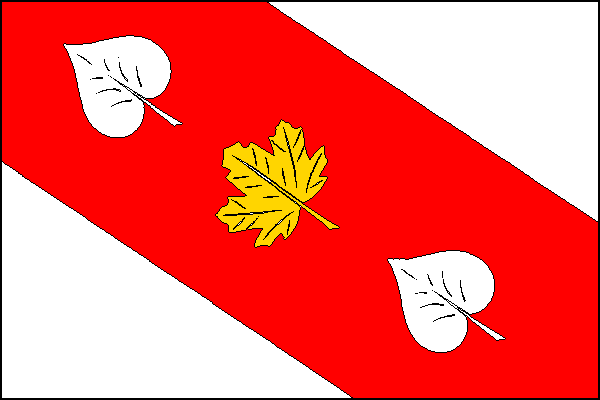
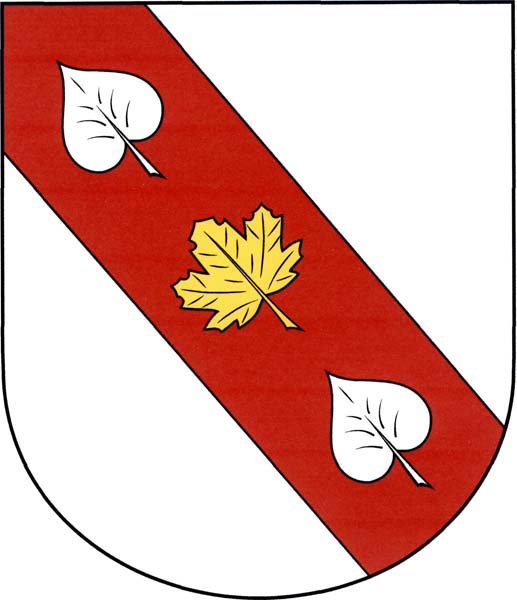
- Flag Coat of arms

- Location in the Czech Republic
- Coordinates: 49°58′54″N 14°34′42″E
- Country: Czech Republic
- Region: Central Bohemian
- District: Prague-East
- First mentioned: 1309

Area
  - Total: 3.85 km^{2} (1.49 sq mi)
- Elevation: 328 m (1,076 ft)

Population (2026-01-01)
  - Total: 1,356
  - Density: 352/km^{2} (912/sq mi)
- Time zone: UTC+1 (CET)
  - Summer (DST): UTC+2 (CEST)
- Postal code: 251 70
- Website: www.dobrejovice.cz

Dobřejovice is a municipality and village in Prague-East District in the Central Bohemian Region of the Czech Republic. It has about 1,400 inhabitants.

== Etymology ==
The name is derived from the personal name Dobřej, meaning "the village of Dobřej's people". From the second half of the 18th century until the first half of the 19th century, the village was called Manderscheid after the then-owner of the village, Count of Manderscheid. However, the people did not use the new name, so the old name was restored.

== Geography ==
Dobřejovice is located about 8 kilometres (5 mi) southeast of Prague. It lies in the Prague Plateau. The highest point is at 369 m (1,211 ft) above sea level. The stream Dobřejovický potok flows through the municipality and supplies two fishponds there.

== History ==
The first written mention of Dobřejovice is from 1309. The owners of the village often changed hands and most of them were various less important Czech nobles.

== Demographics ==
Historical population

Year	Pop.	±%
1869	406	—
1880	445	+9.6%
1890	439	−1.3%
1900	404	−8.0%
1910	439	+8.7%

Year	Pop.	±%
1921	412	−6.2%
1930	400	−2.9%
1950	331	−17.2%
1961	324	−2.1%
1970	276	−14.8%

Year	Pop.	±%
1980	340	+23.2%
1991	425	+25.0%
2001	567	+33.4%
2011	1,025	+80.8%
2021	1,235	+20.5%

Source: Censuses

== Transport ==
The D0 motorway (part of the European route E50) runs through the southern part of the municipality. The D1 motorway runs east of Dobřejovice just outside the municipality.

== Sights ==
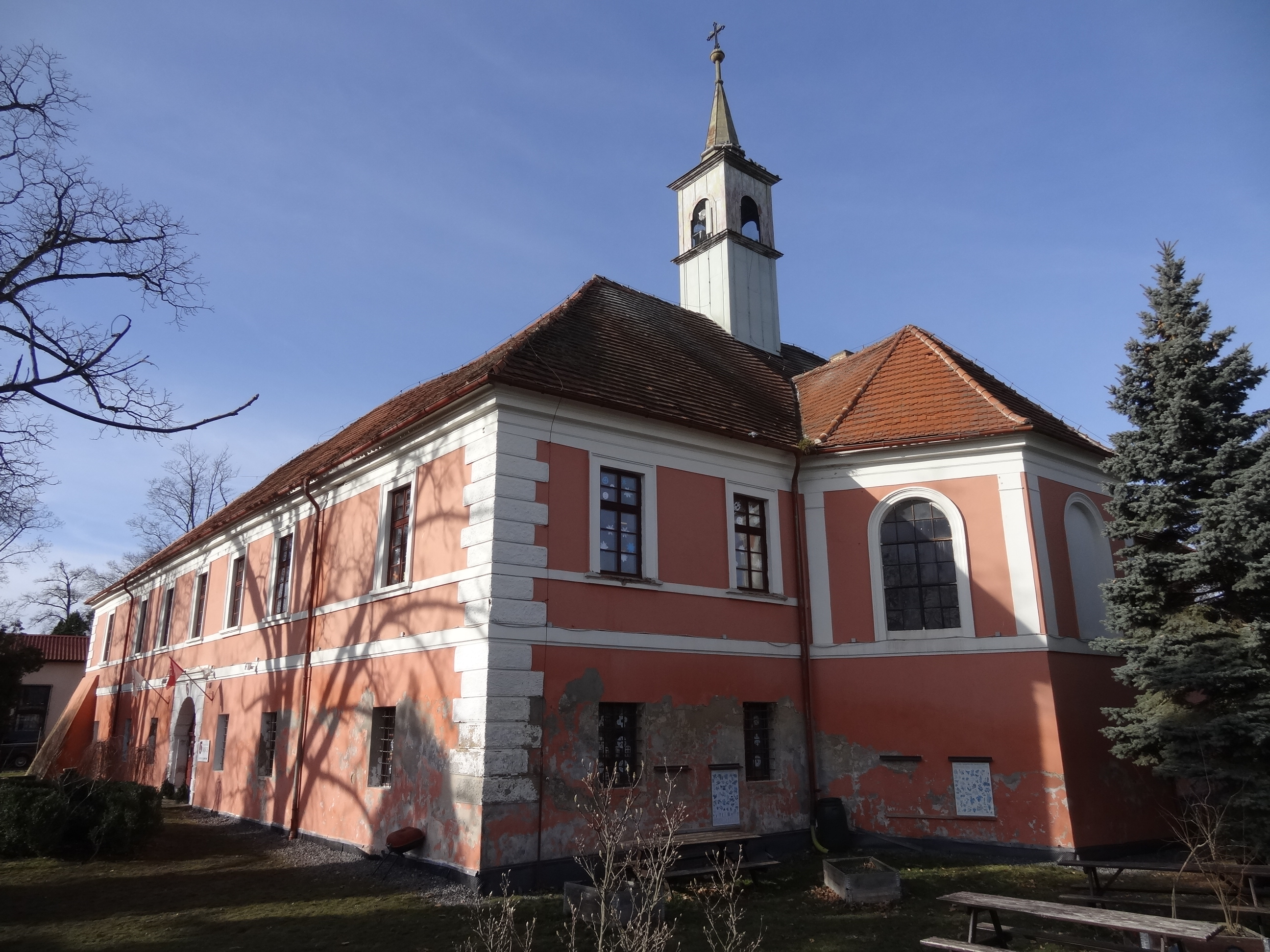
Dobřejovice Castle

The main landmark of Dobřejovice is the Dobřejovice Castle. Originally a medieval fortress, it was rebuilt into the castle at the end of the 17th century, then it was rebuilt into its present Baroque form in the 18th century. Part of the castle is the Chapel of the Holy Trinity. Today the castle is privately owned and inaccessible.

== Notable people ==
- Václav Vačkář (1881–1954), composer and conductor
