= Baron Prášil (film) =

1940 film

- Directed by: Martin Frič
- Written by: Václav Wasserman
- Starring: Vlasta Burian
- Cinematography: Václav Hanuš
- Edited by: Jan Kohout
- Music by: Julius Kalaš
- Production company: Slavia Film
- Distributed by: Ústřední půjčovna filmů
- Release date: 13 September 1940
- Running time: 99 minutes
- Countries: Protectorate of Bohemia and Moravia
- Language: Czech

Baron Prášil is a Czech comedy film directed by Martin Frič. It was released in 1940.

== Cast ==
- Vlasta Burian as Baron Archibald Prásil
- Antonin Mikulic as Pepik
- Meda Valentová as Baroness Olga
- Zorka Průcha as Countess Carla
- Anna Steimarová as Aunt Emma
- Oldřich Nový as Arnost Benda
- Jaroslav Marvan as Bedrich Emanuel Benda
- Ella Nollová as Marie Bendova
- Čeněk Šlégl as Count Bohdan Kocharowski
- Frantisek Roland as Ronald
- Václav Trégl as Patocia
- Theodor Pištěk as Entertainer
- František Filipovský as Waiter
- Karel Postranecký as Hunter
