= Václav Vačkář =

Czech composer and conductor (1881–1954)

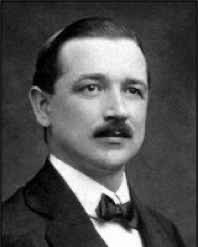
- Born: 12 August 1881; Dobřejovice, Bohemia, Austria-Hungary
- Died: 4 February 1954 (aged 72); Prague, Czechoslovakia
- Occupations: Composer, conductor
- Era: Late Romantic
- Style: Nationalism
- Spouse: Johanna Faltysová (years of marriage unknown)
- Children: Dalibor C. Vačkář
- Awards: Smetana Prize of Prague

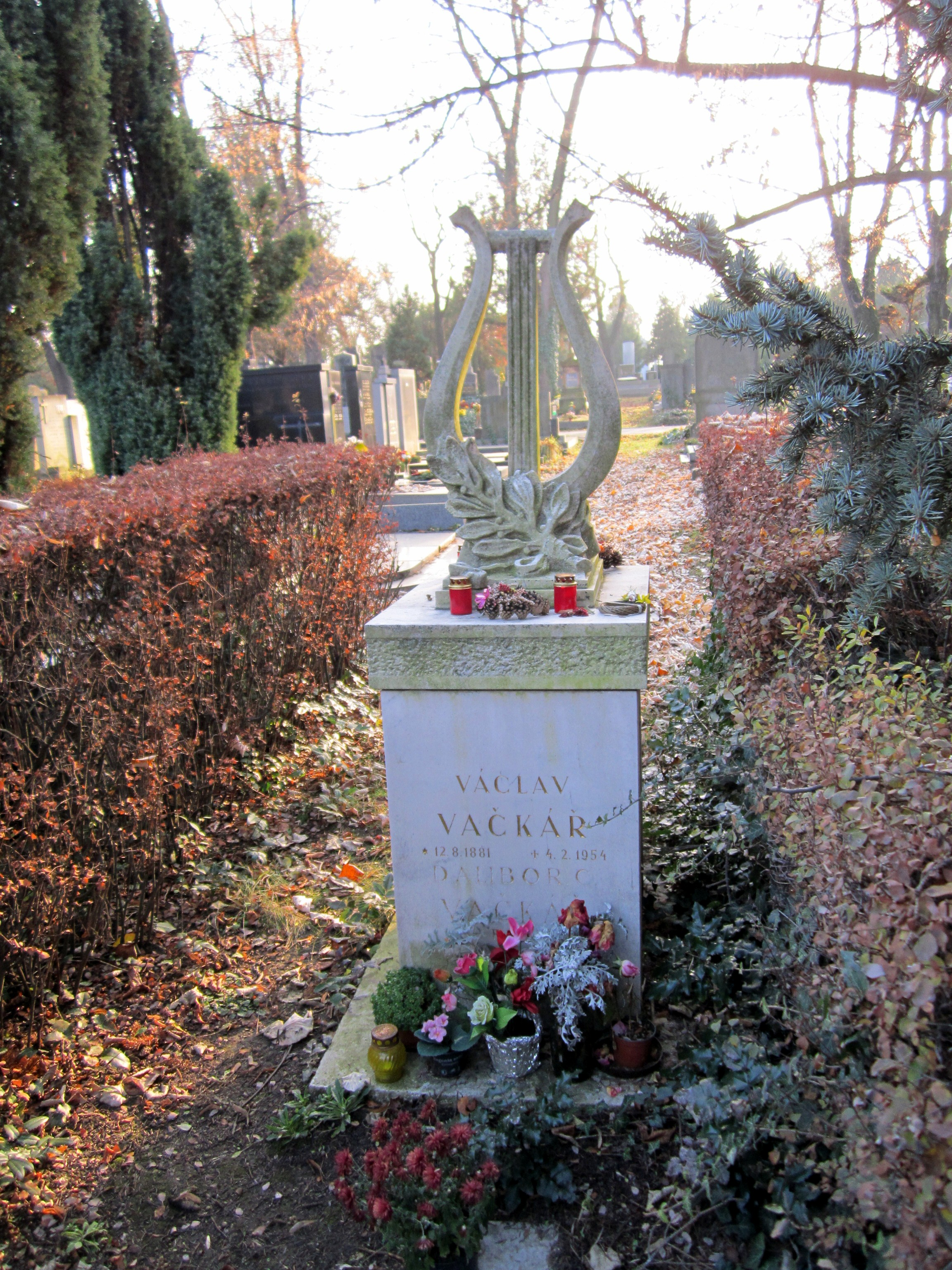
His family grave in Prague

Václav Vačkář (12 August 1881 – 4 February 1954) was a Czech composer and conductor of the late romantic era. He is well known for his marches, especially for his march "Šohaj". Vačkář is also a very prolific composer with over 300 original pieces of music.

== Biography ==
Vačkář received military training in Przemyśl, Poland, from 1895 to 1898 during which he began learning about music through a military program. After his time in Poland Váckář began to play and conduct in various local orchestras including the Czech Philharmonic. In 1952 he wrote the book Instrumentace symfonického orchestru a hudby dechové ("Instrumentation for the Symphony Orchestra and Wind Music") with his aforementioned son Dalibor C. Vačkář which is still taught in Czech conservatories.

== Influences ==
Vaćkář's predecessor Bedřich Smetana innovated the Czech nationalistic style. A style that embodied the desire many Czechs felt to secede from the Austrian Empire and was also adopted by many Czech composers — including Vaćkář. Another significant influence on Vačkář was Antonín Dvořák who was also a champion of Czech nationalism. Dvořak composed a series of Bohemian dances called the Slavonic Dances which impart inspired Vačkář to compose his own dances from Bohemia.

== Family ==
He was the father of Dalibor C. Vačkář, who was also a notable Czech composer.
