= Sulice (Srebrenica) =

- Village
- Location within Bosnia and Herzegovina
- Coordinates: 43°59′N 19°25′E
- Country: Bosnia and Herzegovina
- Municipality: Srebrenica
- Time zone: UTC+1 (CET)
  - Summer (DST): UTC+2 (CEST)

Sulice (Srebrenica) is a village in the municipality of Srebrenica, Bosnia and Herzegovina.
