= Jaroslav Vojta =

Czech actor

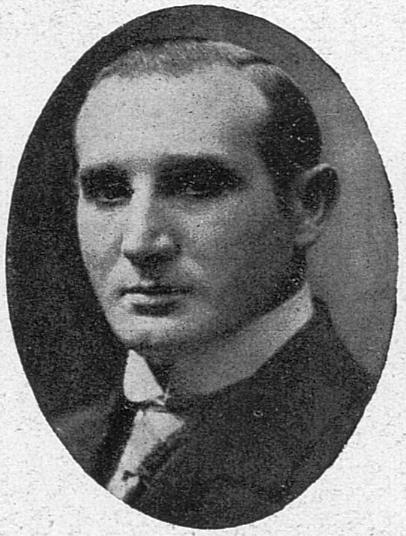
- Born: 27 December 1888; Kutná Hora, Bohemia, Austria-Hungary
- Died: 20 April 1970 (aged 81); Prague, Czechoslovakia
- Occupation: Actor
- Years active: 1921–1970

Jaroslav Vojta (27 December 1888 – 20 April 1970) was a Czech film actor. He appeared in more than 90 films between 1921 and 1970.

== Selected filmography ==
- Karel Havlíček Borovský (1925)
- The Lantern (1925)
- The Eleventh Commandment (1925)
- Hraběnka z Podskalí (1926)
- Hordubalové (1937)
- Muž z neznáma (1939)
- The Girl from Beskydy Mountains (1944)
- The Adventurous Bachelor (1946)
- Divá Bára (1949)
- The Great Opportunity (1950)
- We Love (1952)
- Komedianti (1954)
- Dog's Heads (1955)
- Against All (1956)
- I Dutifully Report (1958)
- První parta (1959)
