= The Inspector General (1933 film) =

1933 film

Revizor
- Directed by: Martin Frič
- Screenplay by: Václav Menger; Prof. Mathesius; V. Solin
- Based on: The Inspector General; 1836 play by Nikolai Gogol
- Starring: Vlasta Burian; Jaroslav Marvan; Václav Trégl
- Cinematography: Jan Stallich
- Edited by: Martin Frič
- Music by: Jára Beneš
- Production company: Meissner Film Prague
- Release date: 29 September 1933
- Running time: 64 minutes
- Country: Czechoslovakia
- Language: Czech

The Inspector General (Czech: Revizor) is a 1933 Czech historical comedy film directed by Martin Frič and starring Vlasta Burian, Jaroslav Marvan and Václav Trégl. It is an adaptation of the 1836 play The Inspector General by Nikolai Gogol. The director Martin Frič considered it one of his best movies.

The film's sets were designed by the art director Štěpán Kopecký. It was shot in studios in Prague.

== Cast ==
- Vlasta Burian as Ivan Alexandrovic Chlestakov
- Jaroslav Marvan as Mayor Anton Antonovich Skvoznik-Dmukhanovsky
- Václav Trégl as Servant Josef
- Josef Vošalík as Pyotr Ivanovich Bobchinsky
- Alois Dvorský as Pyotr Ivanovich Dobchinsky
- Josef Rovenský as Postmaster Ivan Kuzmich Shpekin
- Frantisek Cerný as The Innkeeper
- Theodor Pištěk as Judge Amos Fyodorovich Lyapkin-Tyapkin
- Frantisek Hlavatý as School Commissioner
- Zdeňka Baldová as Anna Andreyevna Skvoznik-Dmukhanovskaya
- Ella Nollová as Prayer
- Josef Gruss as Mayor's servant
- Ferdinand Jarkovský as Waiter
- Eman Fiala as Greengrocer
- Jan Marek as Teacher
- Jan W. Speerger as Chief of Police
- Václav Menger as School guardian Chlopov
- Truda Grosslichtová as Maria Antonovna Skvoznik-Dmukhanovskaya

== See also ==
- The Inspector General (1949 film)

== Bibliography ==
- Goble, Alan. The Complete Index to Literary Sources in Film. Walter de Gruyter, 1999.
