= Otomar Korbelář =

Czechoslovak actor

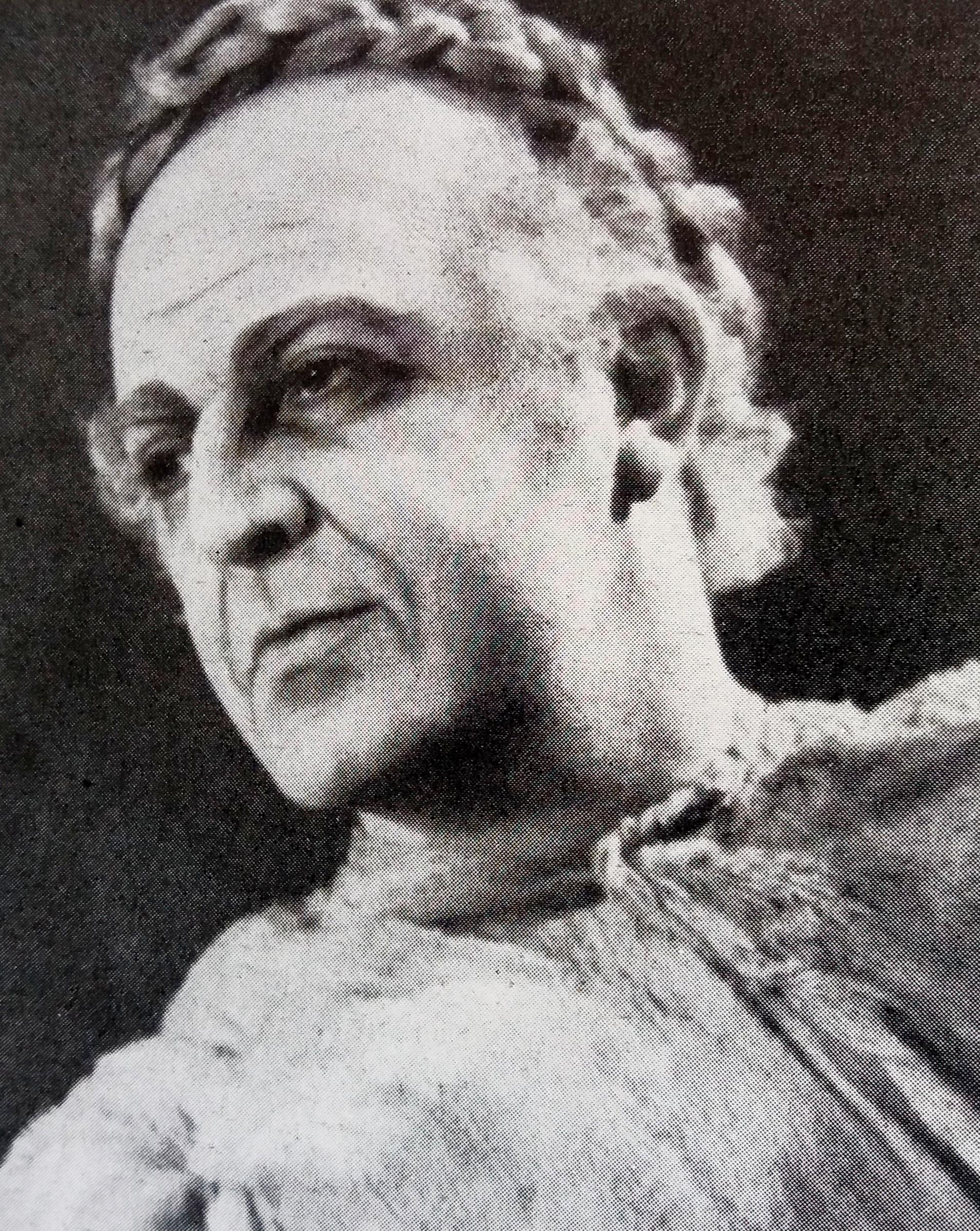
- Born: 3 November 1899; Sázava, Bohemia, Austria-Hungary
- Died: 30 November 1976 (aged 77); Prague, Czechoslovakia
- Occupation: Actor
- Years active: 1931–1976

Otomar Korbelář (3 November 1899 – 30 November 1976) was a Czech film actor. He appeared in more than 40 films between 1931 and 1976.

== Selected filmography ==
- Grand Hotel Nevada (1935)
- The Lantern (1938)
- Pacientka Dr. Hegla (1940)
- The Hard Life of an Adventurer (1941)
- Experiment (1943)
- Happy Journey (1943)
- The Wedding Ring (1944)
- The Girl from Beskydy Mountains (1944)
- The Adventurous Bachelor (1946)
- The Avalanche (1946)
- The Poacher's Foster Daughter or Noble Millionaire (1949)
- Objev na Střapaté hůrce (1962)
- The Day That Shook the World (1975)
