= The Lantern (1938 film) =

- Directed by: Karel Lamač
- Written by: Bohumír Polách; Václav Wasserman; František Kožík
- Based on: Lucerna by Alois Jirásek
- Starring: Jarmila Kšírová; Jarmila Beránková; Otomar Korbelář
- Cinematography: Jan Roth
- Edited by: Marie Bourová
- Music by: Miloš Smatek
- Production company: Terra
- Distributed by: Terra
- Release date: 9 November 1938
- Running time: 85 minutes
- Country: Czechoslovakia
- Language: Czech

The Lantern (Czech: Lucerna) is a 1938 Czech film directed by Karel Lamač and starring Jarmila Kšírová, Theodor Pištěk and Jarmila Beránková. It was based on a play by Alois Jirásek. Lamač made a silent film based on the same play in 1925.

== Cast ==
- Jarmila Kšírová - Countess
- Jarmila Beránková - Hanička
- Otomar Korbelář - Miller Libor
- Theodor Pištěk - Royal official
- František Kreuzmann - Mr. Franc
- Gustav Hilmar as Carpenter Braha
- Jára Kohout as Klásek
- Ferenc Futurista - Vodník Ivan
- Eman Fiala - Vodník Michal
- Jiří Koldovský as Count
- František Voborský as Teacher Zajíček
- Anna Gabrielová - Princess's Chambermaid
