= A Double Life (1924 film) =

1924 film

- Directed by: Václav Kubásek
- Screenplay by: Josef Kokeisl; Václav Kubásek
- Based on: Dvojí život by Vavřinec Řehoř
- Starring: Mary Jansová; Saša Dobrovolná; Jan W. Speerger
- Cinematography: Václav Vích; Josef Kokeisl
- Production company: Pronax-Film
- Distributed by: Pronax-Film
- Release date: 31 October 1924
- Country: Czechoslovakia
- Languages: Silent; Czech intertitles

A Double Life (Czech: Dvojí život) is a 1924 Czechoslovak drama film directed by Václav Kubásek.

== Cast ==
- Mary Jansová as Žofie Dražilová
- Saša Dobrovolná as Žofie's mother
- Jan W. Speerger as Rudolf Slaba
- Eduard Malý as Jan Rokyta
- Jerzy Pawikowski as Beneš
- František Havel as Vojtěch Beneš
- Marie Černá as Jitřenka
- Antonín Marek as Landlord Svoboda
- Tekla Černá as Kateřina Svobodová
- Betty Kysilková as Bábinka
- Jiří Gsöllhofer as Jaroslav Beneš
- Marie Fingerová as Jaroslav's Mother
- Karel Lamač as Drunkard
