= Jiřina Štěpničková =

Czech actress (1912–1985)

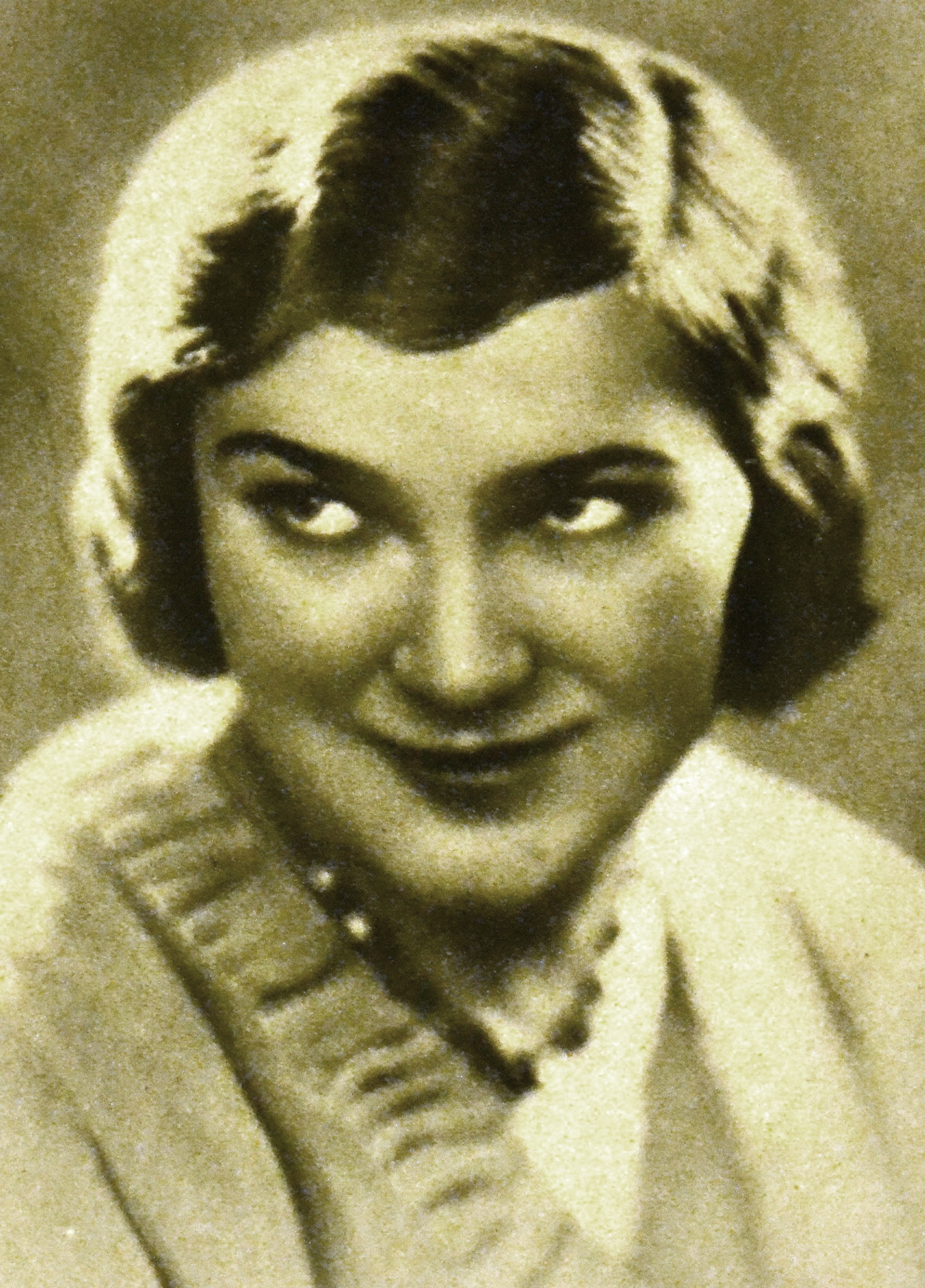
- Jiřina Štěpničková before 1931
- Born: 3 April 1912; Prague, Bohemia, Austria-Hungary
- Died: 5 September 1985 (aged 73); Prague, Czechoslovakia
- Occupation: Actress
- Years active: 1931–1951, 1961–1984

Jiřina Štěpničková (3 April 1912 – 5 September 1985) was a Czech actress. She spent 10 years in prison for an attempt to illegally cross a border.

== Life ==
Jiřina Julie Štěpničková was born on 3 April 1912 in Prague. She started acting at age 16 when her high school professor Jindřich Honzl brought her to Liberated Theatre. In 1930 she was already acting in the National Theatre. From 1936 to 1951 she was acting in the Vinohrady Theatre. In the 1930s and 1940s she was a lead actress in many Czechoslovak movies.

In 1951, she decided to emigrate after receiving a letter allegedly from František Čáp inviting her to West Germany. However the letter was planted by secret service. She was arrested and sentenced to 15 years in prison. Her son was sent to a children's home. Her actor colleagues Zdeněk Štěpánek, Karel Höger or Vlasta Fabianová petitioned the government to have her released. She was finally released in 1961. After her release she continued to play in theatres and appeared in supporting roles in movies. She was fully rehabilated by the government in 1969. She died on 5 September 1985 in Prague. She is buried at the Olšany Cemetery.

Her son was the actor Jiří Štěpnička (1947–2026).

She was played by Zuzana Stivínová Jr. in a 2020 television movie about her life Past (The Trap).

== Selected filmography ==
- Ecstasy (1933) - voice
- Romance from the Tatra Mountains (1934)
- The Heroic Captain Korkorán (1934)
- The Eleventh Commandment (1935)
- Camel Through the Eye of a Needle (1936)
- Grandmother (1940)
- Jan Cimbura (1941)
- Barbora Hlavsová (1942)
- Happy Journey (1943)
- The Dancer (1943)
- The Respectable Ladies of Pardubice (1944)
- The Girl from Beskydy Mountains (1944)
- Saturday (1945)
- Transport from Paradise (1962)
- Larks on a String (1969)
- Witchhammer (1970)
