= Karel Dostal =

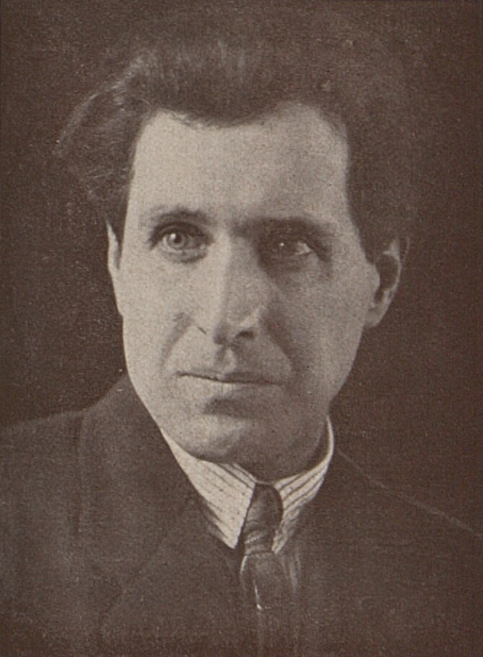
- Born: 14 March 1884; Nymburk, Austria-Hungary
- Died: 1 March 1966 (aged 81); Prague, Czechoslovakia
- Occupation: Actor
- Years active: 1934–1960 (film)

Karel Dostal (14 March 1884 – 1 March 1966) was a Czech stage and film actor.

== Selected filmography ==
- Grand Hotel Nevada (1935)
- The World Is Ours (1937)
- The Magic House (1939)
- Second Tour (1939)
- The Blue Star Hotel (1941)
- The Hard Life of an Adventurer (1941)
- Fourteen at the Table (1943)
- The Dancer (1943)
- Saturday (1945)
- Bohemian Rapture (1947)
- Temno (1950)
