= Dalibor C. Vačkář =

Czech composer

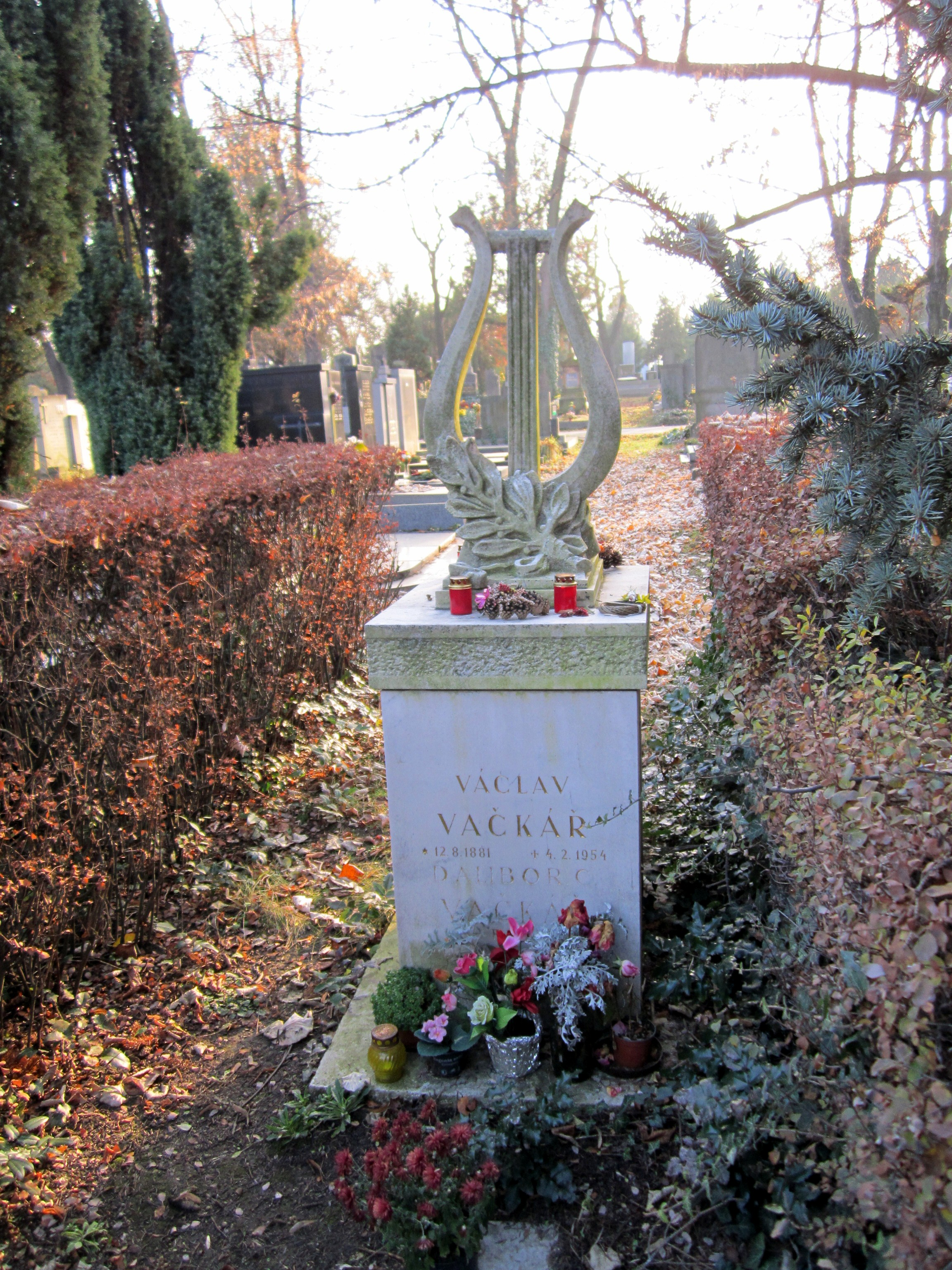
Vačkář family grave at the Vinohrady Cemetery in Prague

Dalibor C. Vačkář (19 September 1906 – 21 October 1984) was a Czech contemporary composer, renowned in Czechoslovakia.

== Biography ==
Dalibor C. Vačkář was born on 19 September 1906 in Korčula in the Adriatic, a son of Václav Vačkář (1881–1954), a musician who later became synonymous with Czech popular music, and Johanna Faltysová, an actress.

Vačkář studied composition with Josef Suk (a pupil and son-in-law of Antonín Dvořák), and violin with Karel Hoffman at the Prague Conservatory, and graduated in 1931.

Dalibor C. Vačkář died in Prague on 21 October 1984, and is buried at the Vinohrady Cemetery.
