= Stříbrný =

Stříbrný (feminine Stříbrná) is a Czech surname meaning "silver". It may refer to:

- Jiří Stříbrný, Czech interwar politician
- Josef Stříbrný, Czech ice hockey player

== See also ==
- Stříbrná, a municipality and village
- Stříbrná Skalice, a municipality and village
- Stříbrné Hory, a municipality and village
- Smogornia (Czech: Stříbrný hřbet), a mountain
- Stříbrný vítr, a Czech novel written by Fráňa Šrámek
- Stříbrný vítr (film), a Czech film
