= Kouty =

Kouty may refer to:

== Places ==
- Kouty, Benin, an arrondissement in Benin

=== Czech Republic ===
- Kouty (Havlíčkův Brod District), a municipality and village in the Vysočina Region
- Kouty (Nymburk District), a municipality and village in the Central Bohemian Region
- Kouty (Třebíč District), a municipality and village in the Vysočina Region
- Kouty, a town part of Hlinsko in the Pardubice Region
- Kouty, a town part of Kravaře in the Moravian-Silesian Region
- Kouty, a village and part of Smilkov in the Central Bohemian Region
- Kouty, a village and part of Sukorady (Jičín District) in the Hradec Králové Region
- Kouty nad Desnou, a village and part of Loučná nad Desnou in the Olomouc Region

== Other ==
- Kouty Mawenh, Liberian sprinter
