= Sukorady =

Sukorady may refer to places in the Czech Republic:

- Sukorady (Jičín District), a municipality and village in the Hradec Králové Region
- Sukorady (Mladá Boleslav District), a municipality and village in the Central Bohemian Region
- Sukorady, a village and part of Snědovice in the Ústí nad Labem Region
