= Torrents of Spring =

1872 novella by Ivan Turgenev

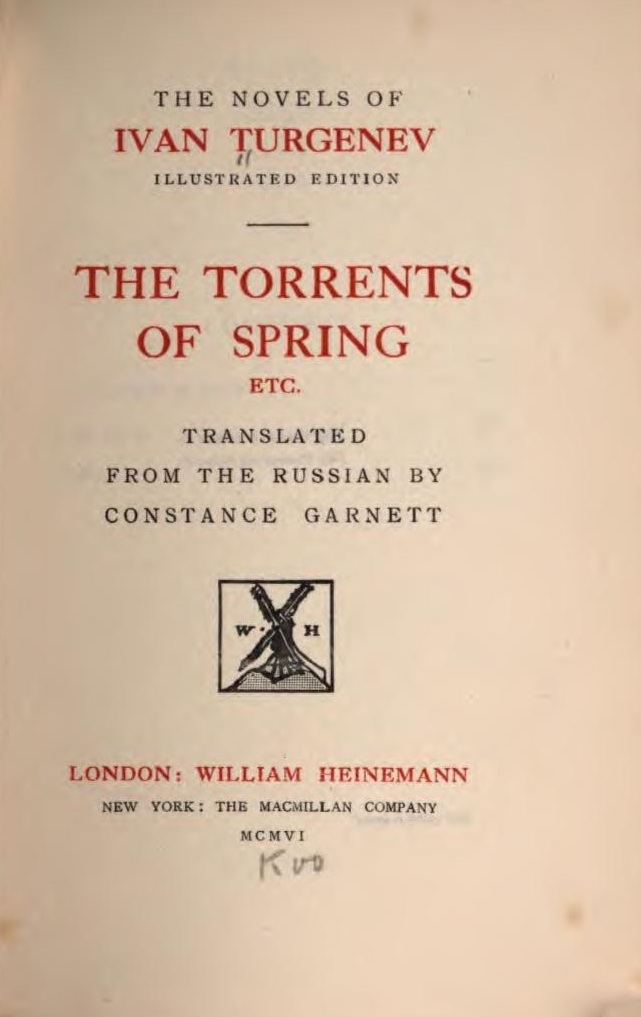
- US edition, 1906 (publ. Farrar, Straus and Cudahy)
- Author: Ivan Turgenev
- Original title: Вешние воды
- Translator: Constance Garnett
- Language: Russian
- Genre: Fiction
- Publisher: First published in Herald of Europe
- Publication date: 1872
- Publication place: Russia
- English publication date: 1897 (Macmillan)
- Media type: Print (Hardcover)

Torrents of Spring, also known as Spring Torrents (Russian: Вешние воды Veshniye vody), is an 1872 novella by Ivan Turgenev. It is highly autobiographical in nature, and centers on a young Russian landowner, Dimitry Sanin, who falls deliriously in love for the first time while visiting the German city of Frankfurt. Written during 1870 and 1871, when Turgenev was in his fifties, the novel is widely held as one of his greatest.

== Inception ==
Despite its fictional overlay, Torrents of Spring is inspired by the events of Turgenev's life during his 1838-1841 tour of the German States.

Although Fathers and Sons remains Turgenev's most famous novel, Torrents of Spring is significant in its revealing of the author's life, thoughts, and most intimate emotions.

=== Gemma ===
According to Turgenev's biographer Leonard Schapiro, the character of Gemma Roselli was inspired by an incident which took place while the future novelist was visiting Frankfurt in 1840. A young woman "of extraordinary beauty suddenly emerged from a tea-room to plead for help in reviving her brother, who had fainted." But, unlike Gemma, the young woman was Jewish rather than Italian and, unlike Sanin, Turgenev left Frankfurt that same night without getting to know her further.

=== Maria Nikolaevna ===
The character of Maria Nikolaevna Polozova is believed to have had two models.

The first was Turgenev's mother, Varvara Petrovna Turgeneva. According to Schapiro, Varvara Petrovna subjected her husband, her son, her servants, and her husband's serfs to systematic physical, emotional, and verbal abuse. All of this left permanent emotional scars upon her son and caused him to always gravitate towards abusive relationships.

The second model is believed to have been Eleonora Petersen, the German first wife of the poet Fyodor Tyutchev, with whom Turgenev "conceived some kind of romantic attachment" during his 1838 voyage from St. Petersburg to Lübeck. At the time, Eleonora was "returning to Munich with her children" and "died the following year". According to Schapiro, Turgenev's "correspondence with his mother suggests that he was in love with" Eleonora, "or fancied himself to be so, but that is as much as we know."

According to Schapiro, there are many indications that Torrents of Spring had "some deep personal meaning" for Turgenev. In a letter to his French publisher Hetzel, the author wrote of Maria Nikolaevna, "This she-devil seduced me as she seduced that nit-witted Sanin."

In response to a letter, criticizing the novel, from the niece of Gustave Flaubert, Turgenev expressed agreement that the second half of the novel, "was not very necessary", but explained, "I allowed myself to be carried away by memories."

Most revealingly, Turgenev told Isaac Pavlovski, "The entire novel is true. I personally lived and felt it. It is my own history." (French: "Tout ce roman-là est vrai. Je l’ai vécu et senti personnellement. C’est ma propre histoire.")

== Composition ==
Turgenev likely began work on what became Torrents of Spring in 1870. Though originally planned as a short story it had expanded to novel length by the time it was finally completed in late 1871. It first saw publication in the January 1872 edition of the Vestnik Evropy (Herald of Europe), the major liberal magazine of late nineteenth century Russia. Though the novel was somewhat unusual for Turgenev in that it was nearly devoid of political or social themes, it enjoyed a great success from its first appearance. The issue of the Vestnik Evropy in which it was first published had to be reprinted, an unprecedented event in the history of Russian periodicals.

== Plot ==
The story opens with a middle-aged Dmitry Sanin rummaging through the papers in his study when he comes across a small cross set with garnets, which sends his thoughts back thirty years to 1840.

In the summer of 1840, a twenty-two-year-old Sanin, arrives in Frankfurt en route home to Russia from Italy at the culmination of a European tour. During his one-day layover he visits a confectioner's shop where he is rushed upon by a beautiful young woman who emerges frantic from the back room. She is Gemma Roselli, the daughter of the shop's proprietress, Leonora Roselli. Gemma implores Sanin to help her younger brother who has passed out and seems to have stopped breathing. Thanks to Sanin's aid, the boy – whose name is Emilio – emerges from his faint. Grateful for his assistance, Gemma invites Sanin to return to the shop later in the evening to enjoy a cup of chocolate with the family.

Later that evening, Sanin formally meets the members of the Roselli household. These include the matriarch, Leonora (or Lenore) Roselli, her daughter Gemma, her son Emilio (or Emile), and the family friend Pantaleone, a rather irascible old man and retired opera singer. Over conversation that evening Sanin grows increasingly enamoured with the young Gemma, while the Roselli family is also well-taken by the young, handsome, educated, and gracious Russian. Sanin so enjoys his evening that he forgets about his plans to take the diligence on to Berlin that night and so misses it. At the end of the evening Leonora Roselli invites Sanin to return the next day. Sanin is also disappointed to learn that Gemma is in fact engaged to a young German named Karl Klüber.

The following day Sanin is visited in his room by Gemma's fiancé, Karl Klüber, and the still recovering Emilio. Klüber thanks Sanin for his help in assisting Gemma and resuscitating Emilio and invites Sanin on an excursion he has arranged the following day to Soden. That evening Sanin enjoys another enjoyable time with the Rosellis and becomes yet more taken by the charm and beauty of Gemma.

The next morning Sanin joins Klüber, Gemma, and Emilio for the trip to Soden. During lunch at an inn the party shares the restaurant with a group of drinking soldiers. A drunken officer among their number approaches Gemma and rather brazenly declares her beauty. Gemma is infuriated by this behaviour, and Klüber, also angry, orders the small party to leave the dining room. The enraged Sanin on the other hand, feels compelled to confront the soldiers, and going over declares the offending officer an insolent cur and his behaviour unbecoming an officer. Sanin also leaves his calling card, anticipating he might be challenged to a duel for his public words.

The following morning a friend of the offending German officer arrives early at Sanin's door demanding either an apology or satisfaction on behalf of his friend. Sanin scoffs at any notion of apologizing and so a duel is arranged for the following day near Hanau. For his second Sanin invites the old man Pantaleone, who accepts and is impressed by the nobility and honour of the young Russian, seeing in him a fellow “galant'uomo.” Sanin keeps the planned duel a secret between himself and Pantaleone, though the latter reveals it to Emilio. Departing the Roselli home that night, Sanin has a brief encounter with Gemma, who calls him over to a darkened window when she spots him leaving along the street. As they whisper to one another there is a sudden gust of wind that sends Sanin's hat flying and pushes the two together. Sanin later feels this was the moment he began to fall in love with Gemma.

The next morning on the way to Hanau, Pantaleone's earlier bravado has largely faded. Sanin does his best to embolden him. At the subsequent duel Sanin gets off the first shot but misses, while his opponent, the Baron von Dönhof, shoots deliberately into the air. The officer, feeling his honor has been satisfied, then apologizes for his drunken behavior, an apology Sanin readily accepts. Sanin feels somewhat disgusted afterward that the whole duel was a farce. Pantaleone, however, is overjoyed with the outcome. Returning to Frankfurt with Pantaleone and Emilio (who had secretly followed him to the duel site), Sanin discovers that Emilio has in turn told Gemma about the duel. Sanin is a little put off by the indiscretion of this pair of chatterboxes, but cannot be angry. Back in Frankfurt, Sanin soon learns from a distraught Frau Lenore that Gemma has cancelled her engagement to Klaus for no apparent reason than that he did not defend her honor sufficiently at the inn. Frau Lenore is frantic at the idea of the scandal this will cause and Sanin promises to talk to Gemma and convince her to reconsider. In Sanin's subsequent talk with Gemma, she professes her love for him but tells him that for his sake she will reconsider her estrangement from Klaus.

Astonished and overcome by her confession of love, Sanin then urges her to do nothing just yet. Sanin then returns to his rooms to orient himself to this new development and there pens his own declaration of love to Gemma and gives it to Emilio to deliver. Gemma sends her response telling Sanin not to come to their home the next day, without providing an exact reason. So the next day Sanin spends with a delighted Emilio in the countryside and that evening returns to his rooms to find a note from Gemma asking him to meet her in a quiet public garden of Frankfurt at seven the next morning. This Sanin does and the two declare their love for one another and Sanin proposes marriage. Frau Lenore is shocked and hurt to learn of Sanin's love and thinks Sanin a hypocrite and a cunning seducer. But Sanin demands to meet with the disconsolate Frau Lenore and eventually convinces her of his noble intentions as well as his noble birth and his income sufficient to care for Gemma.

Sanin decides he must sell his small estate near Tula in Russia in order to pay for his planned nuptials and settling down with Gemma. By chance, he meets in the street the next day an old schoolmate of his, Hippolyte Sidorovich Polozov, who has come to Frankfurt from nearby Wiesbaden to do some shopping for his wealthy wife, Maria Nikolaevna. This seems to confirm Sanin's notion that a lucky star follows lovers, for Maria is from the same region near Tula as himself, and her wealth might make her a likely prospect to buy his estate, thus saving him a journey home to Russia. Sanin proposes this notion to the phlegmatic Hippolyte, who informs Sanin that he is never involved in his wife's financial decisions but that Sanin is welcome to return to Wiesbaden with him to present the idea to Maria. Sanin agrees though it will pain him to separate from Gemma. With Gemma and Frau Lenore's blessing, Sanin then makes the journey to Wiesbaden.

In Wiesbaden, Sanin soon meets the mysterious Maria Nikolaevna Polozov, and though conscious of her beauty is all business as Gemma still owns his heart. Maria asks about Sanin's love and upon hearing he is engaged to a confectionery professes herself impressed by Sanin, whom she calls “a man who is not afraid to love” despite the differences in class between himself and Gemma. Maria informs him that she herself is the daughter of a peasant and indeed speaks to Sanin in the Russian of the common classes rather than high Russian or French. Maria is interested in purchasing Sanin's estate but asks Sanin to give her two days to contemplate it. In the days that follow, and seemingly against his own will and inclination, Sanin finds himself increasingly obsessed by the curious Maria Nikolaevna as she intrudes herself upon his thoughts. In Wiesbaden Sanin also discovers the presence of none other than the Baron von Dönhof, who seems also to be smitten by Maria Nikolaevna. Maria invites Sanin to the theater where they share a private box. Bored with the play they retreat further into the box where Maria confesses what she cherished more than anything else is freedom, and thus her marriage to the rather witless Polozov, a marriage in which she can have absolute freedom. Before parting company for the evening Dmitry agrees to go riding with Maria the following day, in what he thinks will be their last meeting before he returns to Frankfurt and she proceeds to Paris. The next morning the pair heads off on their ride in the countryside accompanied only by a single groom, whom Maria soon dispatches to a local inn to wile away the afternoon, leaving her and Sanin to themselves. The seemingly fearless Maria leads Sanin on a vigorous ride across the countryside that leaves them invigorated and their horses breathless. When a thunderstorm moves in Maria leads them both to an abandoned cottage where they make love.

After their return to Wiesbaden, Sanin is eaten with remorse. When Maria greets her husband in his presence Sanin detects an uncharacteristic look of irritation on Polozov's face and it is revealed that he and his wife Maria had a wager on whether she could seduce Sanin, a wager Polozov has now lost. Maria asks Sanin if he is to return to Frankfurt or accompany them to Paris. His response is that he will follow Maria until she drives him away. His humiliation is complete.

The story then reverts to the present, some thirty years after these events. Sanin is again in his study, contemplating the garnet cross (previously revealed to have belonged to Gemma); and Sanin is again eaten with remorse, and recalls all the bitter and shameful memories he felt after the events of Wiesbaden, such as how he sent a tearful letter to Gemma that went unanswered, how he sent a groom of the Polozovs to fetch his things in Frankfurt, and even how the elderly Pantaleone, accompanied by Emilio, came to Wiesbaden to curse him. Most of all he recounts his embittered and shame-ridden life afterwards, in which he followed Maria until he was thrown off like an old rag and has since remained unmarried and childless. Now in his fifties, he decides to return to Frankfurt to track down his old love but once there finds no trace of the former Roselli home nor anyone who has even heard of them, though he does discover that Karl Klüber though initially very successful eventually went bankrupt and died in prison. Finally, however, he finds a now retired Baron von Dönhof, who tells him that the Rosellis had long since emigrated to America.

Through the conversation of von Dönhof and Sanin it is also revealed that Maria Nikolaevna died “long ago.” With the help of a friend of von Dönhof, Sanin obtains Gemma's address in New York, where she is married to a certain Slocum. Sanin immediately writes to her, describing the events of his life and begging that she respond as a sign that she forgives him. He vows to remain in Frankfurt at the same inn he stayed in thirty years ago until he receives her response. Eventually she does write and forgives him, while telling him about the lives of her family (she now has five children) and wishing him happiness, while also expressing the joy it would give her to see him again, though she doesn't think it likely. She encloses a picture of her eldest daughter, Marianna, who is engaged to be married. Sanin anonymously sends Marianna a wedding gift: Gemma's garnet cross, now set in a necklace of magnificent pearls. The novel ends with the author noting rumors that Sanin, who is quite financially well off, is planning to sell off his property and move to America.

== Characters (in order of appearance) ==
Dmitry Pavlovich Sanin – a young Russian nobleman of property and almost without family ties who is traveling in Europe after coming upon a modest inheritance and before taking up an official position in Russia

Gemma Roselli – the beautiful daughter of Leonora Roselli who was born and raised in Germany though still maintains her "clear, southern nature"; at the novel's outset she is engaged to Karl Klüber

Pantaleone Cippatola – an old man and former opera singer and a regular at the Roselli household, where he occupies a position somewhere between family friend and servant; in spite of his prolonged residence in Germany, he speaks little German

Emilio Roselli, or Emil – younger, and only, brother of Gemma; of weak constitution, he has romantic aspirations for the theatre but his mother wishes him to be set up as a merchant

Leonora Roselli, or Frau Lenore – matriarch of the Roselli household; originally from Parma, she is the widow of Giovanni Battista Roselli, an Italian from Vicenza, who settled in Frankfurt as a confectioner

Giovanni Battista Roselli – the now deceased founder of Roselli's Confectionary Shop who came – or fled – to Frankfurt from his native Italy (presumably due to his involvement in revolutionary activity) some twenty-five years before the main events of the story take place; upon his death he left behind a widow, one daughter, and one son

Karl Klüber – the young German fiancé of Gemma when the novel begins; "decorous, dignified, and affable," he nevertheless has the workaday air of an up-and-coming merchant

Baron von Dönhof – a German officer who fights a duel with Sanin early in the novel and then crosses paths again with Sanin in Wiesbaden

Herr Second Lieutenant von Richter – fellow officer of von Dönhof and his second in the duel with Sanin

Hippolyte Sidorovich Polozov – an old schoolmate of Sanin's and husband of Maria Nikolaevnka Polozov; a phlegmatic and rather dull figure with a large appetite who is well-kept by his wife's income and glad to do his wife's bidding if only to be left alone

Maria Nikolaevna Polozova – wealthy wife of Hippolyte Sydorovych Polozov; a femme fatale who sets out to seduce Sanin

== Adaptations ==
A film based on the novel, written and directed by Jerzy Skolimowski, was released in 1989. The film, which competed for the Golden Palm Award at the 1989 Cannes Film Festival, stars Timothy Hutton, Nastassja Kinski, and Valeria Golino. There had also been two Soviet and one Czechoslovak adaptations.

- Jarní vody (1968) by Václav Krška
