= Fiery Summer =

- Theatrical release poster
- Directed by: František Čáp; Václav Krška
- Written by: František Čáp; Václav Krška
- Based on: Odcházeti s podzimem by Václav Krška
- Starring: Václav Sova; Lída Baarová; Svatopluk Beneš
- Narrated by: Jiřina Šejbalová
- Cinematography: Karel Degl
- Edited by: Antonín Zelenka
- Music by: Jiří Srnka
- Production company: Lucernafilm
- Distributed by: Lucernafilm
- Release date: October 20, 1939
- Running time: 91 minutes
- Countries: Protectorate of Bohemia and Moravia
- Language: Czech

Fiery Summer (Czech: Ohnivé léto) is a 1939 Czech drama film directed by František Čáp and Václav Krška based on a novel by Krška.

== Production ==
The film was shot around Bechyně. The chateau scenes were shot at Konopiště Castle and Smetanova Lhota.

== Cast ==
- Václav Sova as Julio
- Lída Baarová as Rosa
- Svatopluk Beneš as Šimon
- Zorka Janů as Red Klárka
- Otylie Beníšková as Julio's Aunt
- Antonie Nedošinská as Paulina
- Josef Stadler as Petr
- Jaroslav Liška as Střevlík
- František Roland as Ferryman
- Jan W. Speerger as Railway worker
- Bohdan Lachman as Butler
