= Jana Rybářová (actress) =

Czech actress

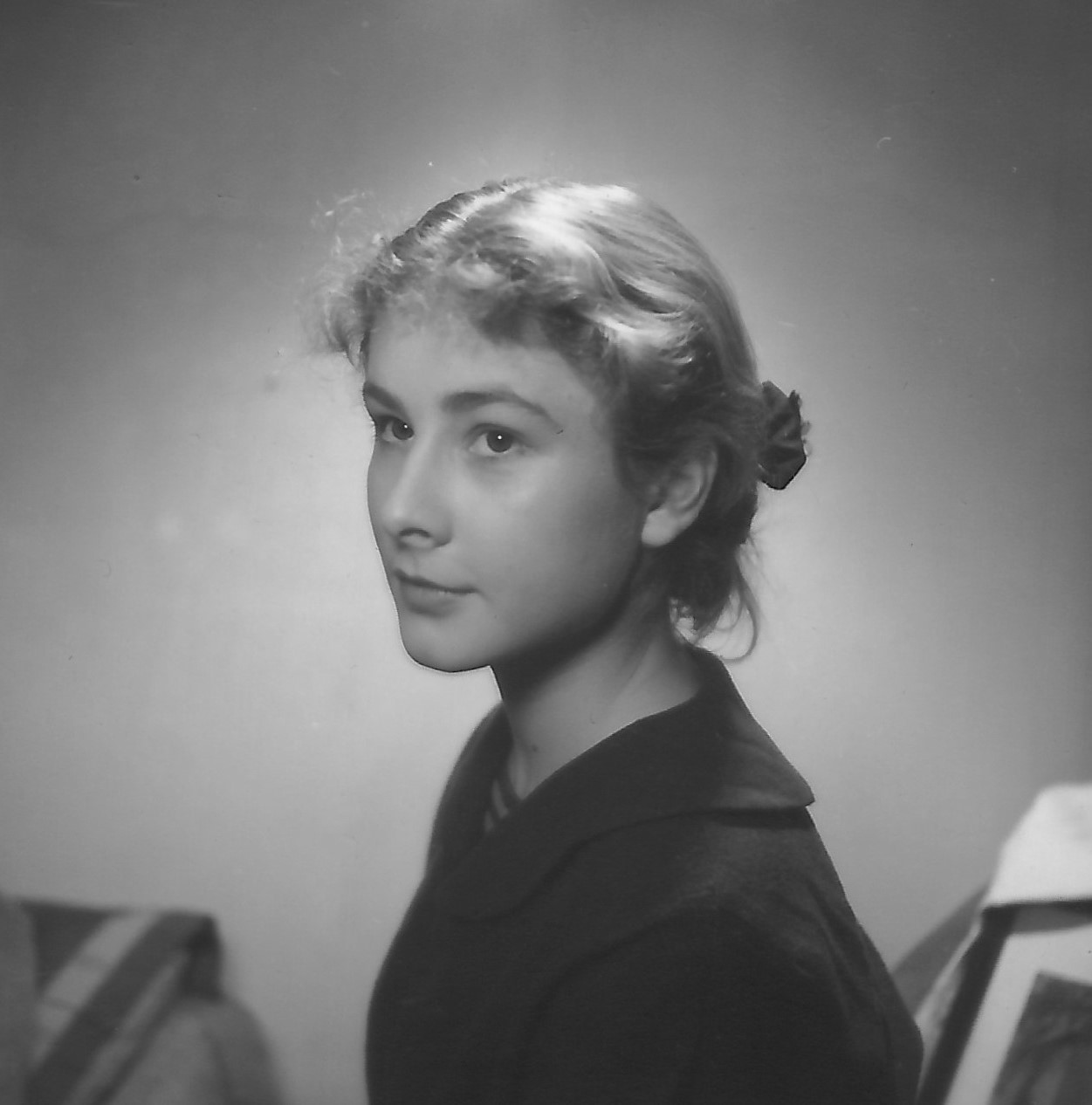
- Born: 31 March 1936; Prague, Czechoslovakia
- Died: 11 February 1957 (aged 20); Prague, Czechoslovakia (now Czech Republic)
- Occupation: Actress
- Years active: 1954–1956

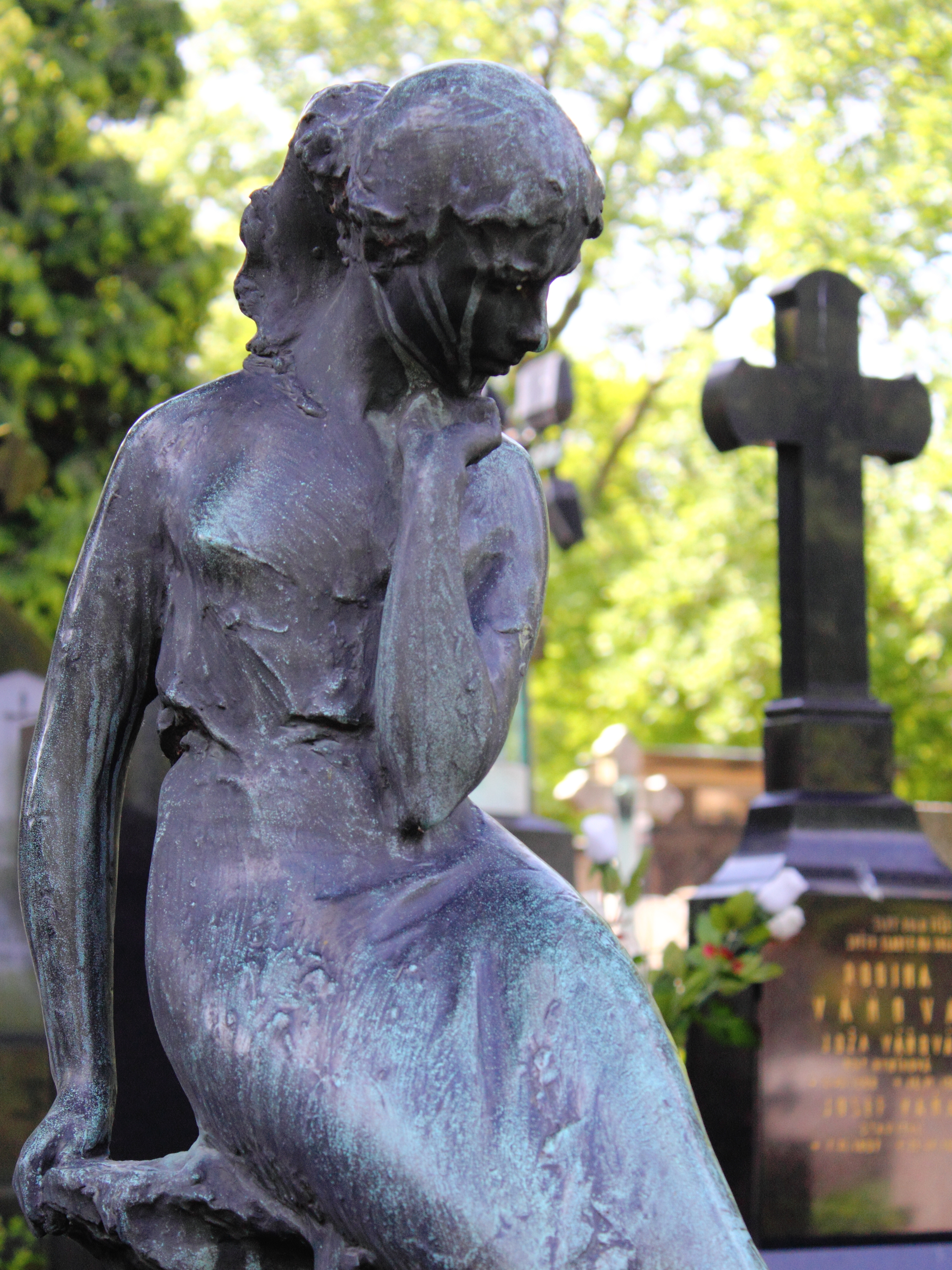
Jana Rybářová, Vyšehrad Cemetery, Prague

Jana Rybářová ( 31 March 1936 – 11 February 1957) was a Czech film and stage actress.

Discovered by film director Václav Krška, she was recognized as one of the rising stars of the 1950s despite featuring only in six films (and one student film). She committed suicide, in a widespread opinion, after a complicated platonic romance with married opera singer Přemysl Kočí, aggravated by various rumours.

In 2000 Marek Bouda shot a documentary Nelze umírat štěstím (One Should Not Die of Happiness) about her life. In 2001 Jana Havlíková published a book Nevyjasněná úmrtí VII (Unexplained Deaths VII) about lives and deaths of actors Jana Rybářová, Karel Höger and František Husák.

== Filmography ==
- Stříbrný vítr (1954)
- Z mého života (1955)
- V ulici je starý krám (1955)
- Dalibor (1956)
- Labakan (1956)
- Legenda o lásce (1956)
- Proti všem (1957)
