= Zorka Janů =

Czech actress

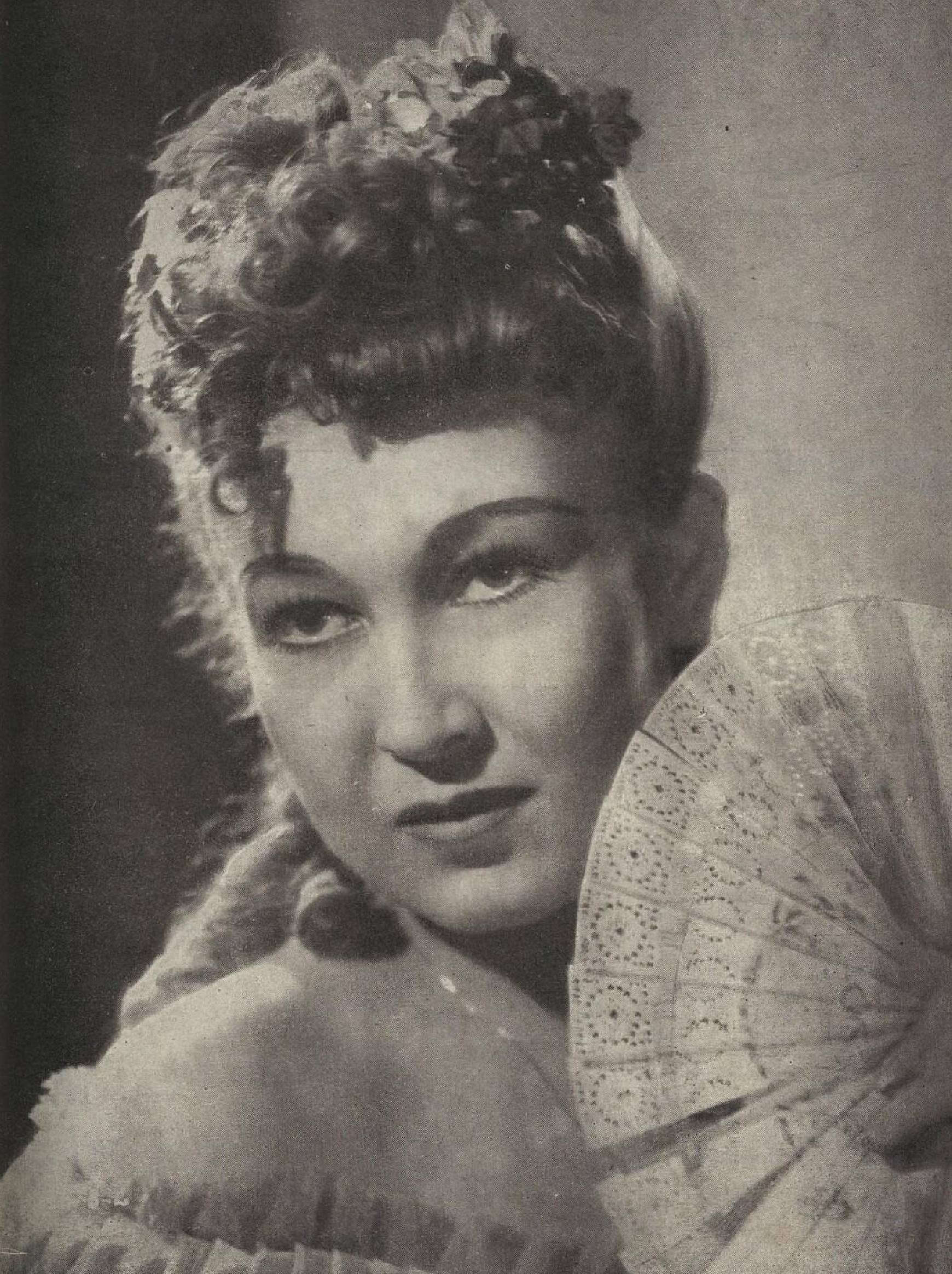
- Zorka Janů
- Born: Zora Babková; 9 July 1921; Štěchovice, Czechoslovakia
- Died: 24 March 1946 (aged 24); Prague, Czechoslovakia
- Occupation: Actress
- Years active: 1933–1944
- Relatives: Lída Baarová (sister)

Zorka Janů (born Zora Babková; 9 July 1921 – 24 March 1946) was a Czech film actress. She was the younger sister of actress Lída Baarová.

== Career ==
=== Early years (1921–1938) ===
When she was 12 years old, she appeared in the movie Madla z cihelny (Brickmaker's daughter, 1933) alongside her sister who played the principal role. She studied drama at the Prague's Conservatory.

=== The Virgins' Club (1938–1939) ===
The year after she acted in the 1938 film Cech panen kutnohorských (The Virgins' Club), she got her first big role in the František Čáp and Václav Krška's movie Fiery Summer (Ohnivé léto), about a love triangle between Clare (Janů), who loves a man named Šimon (Svatopluk Beneš), who in turn loves Rose (Lída Baarová). Clare attempts suicide by jumping into the river. Two young men in love with her throw themselves into the torrent to save her, but one of them drowns. During the shooting of Fiery Summer, Zorka Janů fell in love with the writer and poet František Kožík.

=== World War II (1939–1945) ===
In the 1940s Zorka Janů appeared in seven movies, among them Baron Münchhausen and Rubens’ Caper. She played a leading role in the movie Čekanky (Ladies in Waiting, 1940) about an aging count who forbids his female staff to marry. Her last movie appearance was as Helen in Jiří Slavíček’s Boys and the River (1944).

=== Final years and death (1945–1946) ===
After Germany lost the war in 1945, her sister Lída Baarová (mistress of Joseph Goebbels) was imprisoned, and her mother died during the interrogation by the Czech retribution tribunal. Zorka Janů was expelled from work, ostracized, and committed suicide by jumping out of a window.

== Legacy ==
The story of Zorka Janů was told by Adam Georgiev in his 1998 book Deník sestry Lídy Baarové (Diary of Lída Baarová's Sister).

Janů was portrayed by Anna Fialová in The Devil's Mistress, a 2016 Czech film about Lída Baarová's acting career and affair with Goebbels.

== Filmography ==
- Kluci na řece (Boys and the River, 1944)
- Z českých mlýnů (Believe it or Not, 1941)
- Minulost Jany Kosinové (Jane's Past, 1940)
- Baron Prášil (Baron Münchhausen, 1940)
- Pacientka Dr. Hegla (Patient of Dr. Hegel, 1940)
- Čekanky (Ladies in Waiting, 1940)
- Podvod s Rubensem (Rubens' Caper, 1940)
- Ohnivé léto (Fiery Summer, 1939)
- Tulák Macoun (Hobo Macoun, 1939)
- Škola základ života (What I learned in High School, 1938)
- Cech panen kutnohorských (The Virgins' Club, 1938)
- Madla z cihelny (Brickmaker's daughter, 1933)
