= Robert Land =

Austrian director

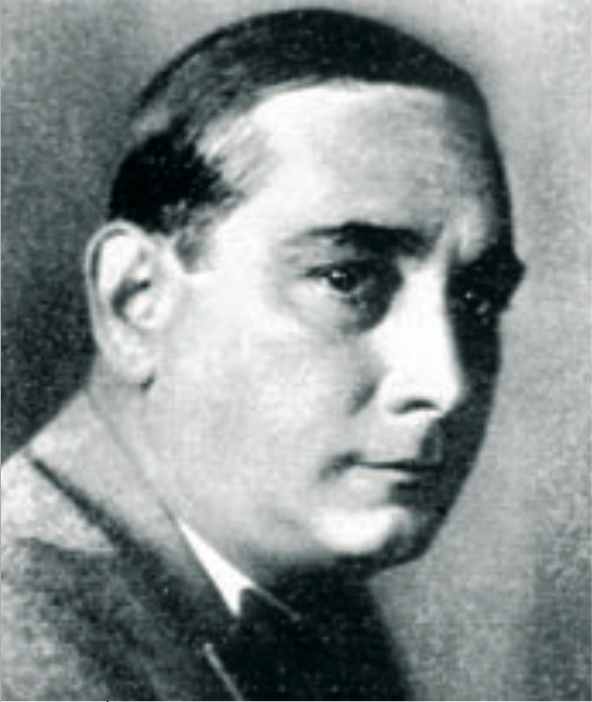
- Born: Robert Liebmann; July 13, 1887; Kroměříž, Moravia, Austria-Hungary
- Died: October 12, 1940 (aged 53); Paris, France
- Occupation: Film director
- Spouse: Irma Liebmann (née Lederer)

Robert Land (1887–1940) was an Austrian-Jewish film director of Moravian descent.

== Biography ==
Born as Robert Liebmann to a German-speaking Jewish Family in Kroměříž. Land moved to Vienna to study German literature and art history. He started directing movies in 1919. He chose the pseudonym Robert Land in order to avoid being mistaken with film critic and screenwriter Robert Liebmann (1890-1942). He made movies in Austria and Germany until 1933, when he fled to Czechoslovakia after Nazis' rise to power. Unable to find work he went to Italy in 1934, before returning to Prague a year later. He directed three movies in Czechoslovakia – Jana (1935), Arme kleine Inge' (1936) and The Doll (1938). In 1938 he moved to Paris, where he died on 12 October 1940. He's buried at Cimetière parisien de Thiais.

== Selected filmography ==
- The Jewess of Toledo (1919, screenwriter)
- Don Juan (1922)
- The Curse (1924)
- The Bank Crash of Unter den Linden (1926)
- Alpine Tragedy (1927)
- The Dashing Archduke (1927)
- Venus in Evening Wear (1927)
- Princess Olala (1928)
- Two Red Roses (1928)
- The Abduction of the Sabine Women (1928)
- Dame Care (1928)
- The Merry Widower (1929)
- I Kiss Your Hand, Madame (1929)
- The Hero of Every Girl's Dream (1929)
- Love and Champagne (1930)
- Boycott (1930)
- Weekend in Paradise (1931)
- 24 Hours in the Life of a Woman (1931)
- Arme kleine Inge (1936)
- The Doll (1938)

== Bibliography ==
- Kosta, Barbara (2009). Willing Seduction: The Blue Angel, Marlene Dietrich and Mass Culture. New York: Berghahn Books. ISBN 978-0-85745-619-9.
- Prawer, Siegbert Salomon (2007) [2005]. Between Two Worlds: The Jewish Presence in German and Austrian Film, 1910–1933. New York: Berghahn Books. ISBN 978-1-84545-303-9.
