= Stříbrný vítr =

1920 novel by Fráňa Šrámek

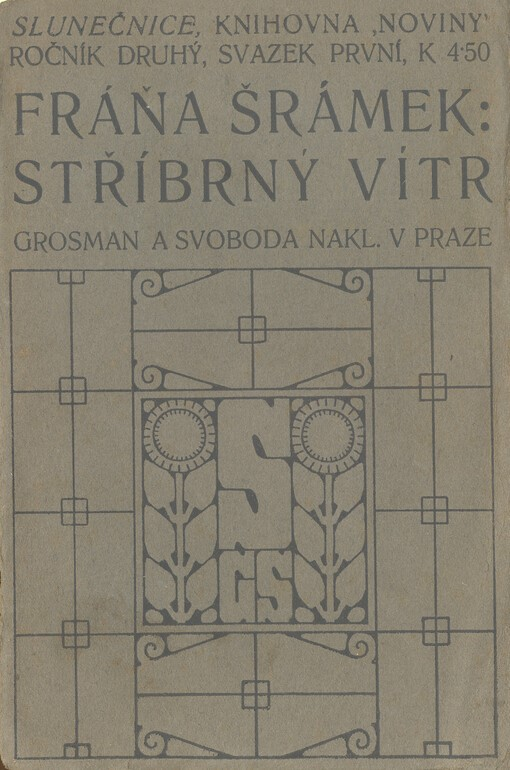
- Cover page for Stříbrný vítr (first edition, 1910) by Fráňa Šrámek
- Author: Fráňa Šrámek
- Language: Czech
- Genre: Novel
- Publisher: František Borový
- Publication date: 1920
- Publication place: Czechoslovakia
- Pages: 363

Stříbrný vítr (English: Silvery Wind) is a lyrical novel by Fráňa Šrámek.

== Publication history ==
Šrámek released the first version of the novel in 1910. The definitive reworked version was released in 1920.

== Adaptation ==
A film adaptation Silvery Wind was made in 1954 by Václav Krška.
