= Věra Ferbasová =

Czech actress (1913–1976)

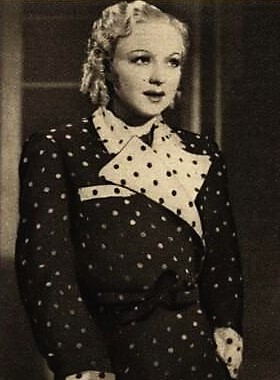
- Věra Ferbasová in 1938
- Born: 21 September 1913; Sukorady, Bohemia, Austro-Hungarian Empire
- Died: 4 August 1976 (aged 62); Prague, Czechoslovakia
- Occupation: Actress
- Years active: 1934–1976

Věra Ferbasová (21 September 1913 – 4 August 1976) was a Czechoslovak film actress.

== Selected filmography ==
- In the Little House Below Emauzy (1933)
- Man in Demand on All Sides (1934)
- A Woman Who Knows What She Wants (1934)
- The Seamstress (1936)
- The Comedian's Princess (1936)
- Three Men in the Snow (1936)
- Delightful Story (1936)
- Andula Won (1937)
- Morality Above All Else (1937)
- Vandiny trampoty (1938)
- The Doll (1938)
- Dobře situovaný pán (1939)
- Larks on a String (1969)
- Case for a Rookie Hangman (1970)
- Jáchyme, hoď ho do stroje! (1974)

== Bibliography ==
- Mihola, Rudolf: Věra Ferbasová: Nejen o smutném konci nejveselejší herečky, Praha: Petrklíč, 2003
