= Olga Scheinpflugová =

Czech actress and writer

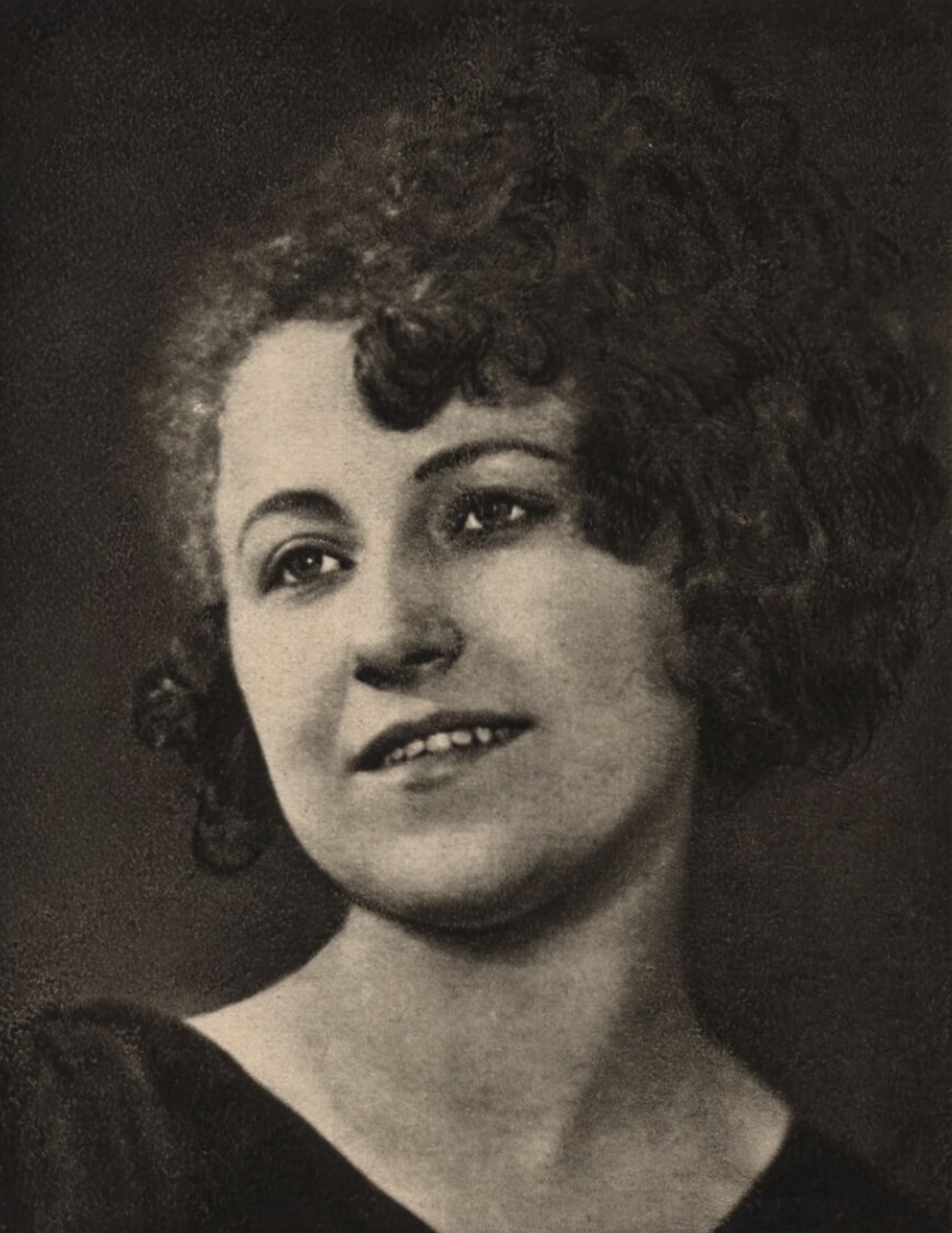
- Born: 3 December 1902; Slaný, Bohemia, Austria-Hungary
- Died: 13 April 1968 (aged 65); Prague, Czechoslovakia
- Occupations: Actress writer
- Spouse: Karel Čapek

Olga Scheinpflugová (3 December 1902 – 13 April 1968) was a Czech actress and writer. She was a daughter of the writer, journalist and playwright Karel Scheinpflug. In 1935, she married the writer Karel Čapek.

== Biography ==
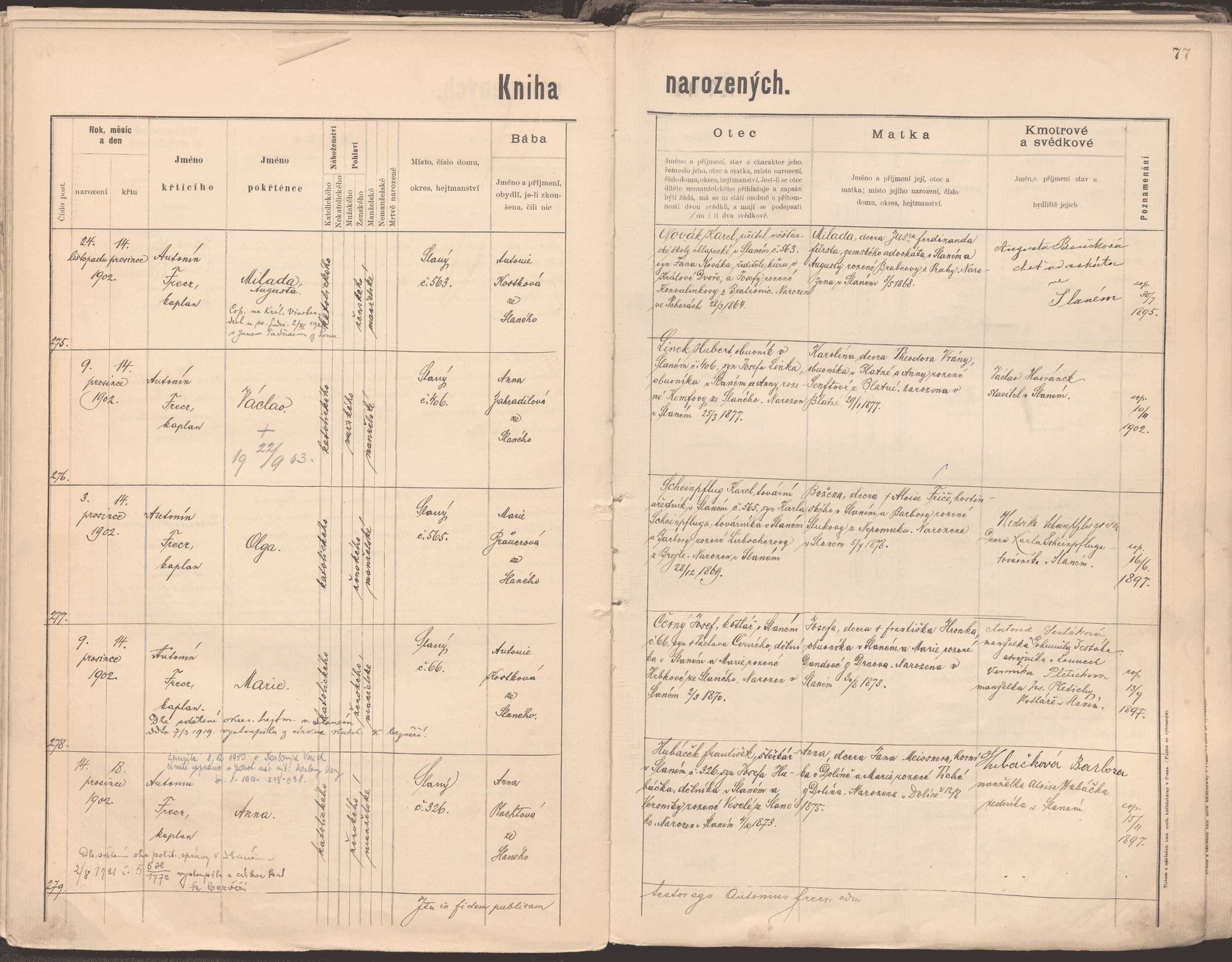
Olga Scheinpflugova birth record (SOkA Kladno)

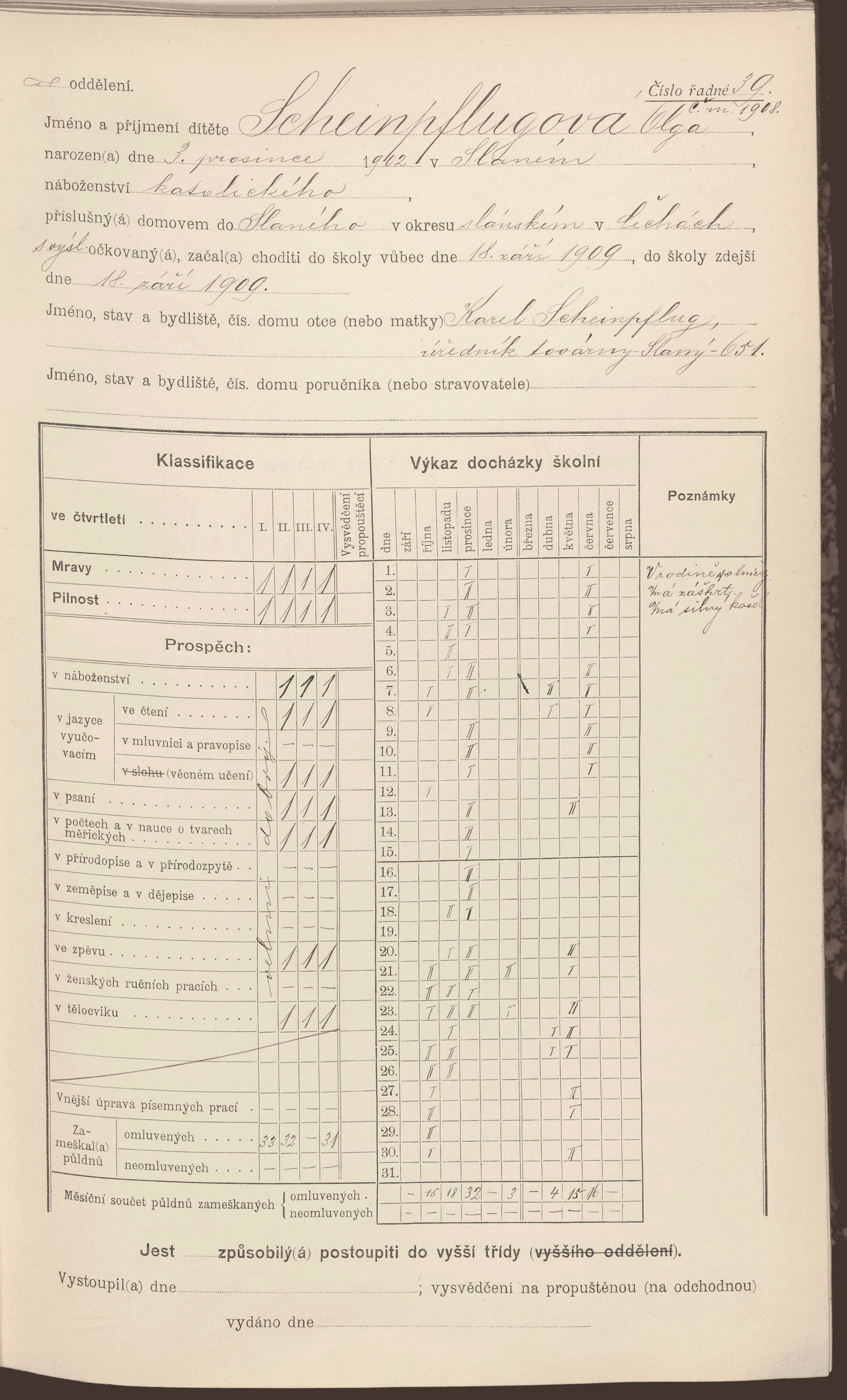
Olga Scheinpflugova school report 1910 (SOkA Kladno)

Scheinpflugová started her acting career at a young age, as a student of the gymnasium in Slaný. From 1917 she studied at the business school in Prague and concurrently she privately studied dramatic art with Marie Hübnerová. In 1920 she was engaged in the Švanda Theatre and two years later she became a member of the City Theatre in Prague-Královské Vinohrady. In 1920 she met and befriended Karel Čapek. From 1929 she began to act in the National Theatre in Prague. With two short interruptions, she remained in the National Theatre until her death. During her career she collaborated with many respected directors, most notably with J. Kvapil, J. Bor, K. H. Hilar, J. Frejka, Otomar Krejča and Alfréd Radok. In 1935 she married Karel Čapek, but their marriage was short, since Čapek died of pneumonia in 1938. Following the German occupation, she was interrogated by the Gestapo as Čapek's work was clearly anti-fascist.

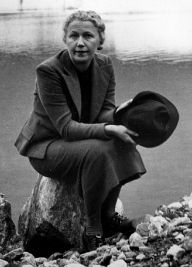
Olga Scheinpflugová in the 1930s; cropped photo taken by her husband Karel Čapek

Alongside her activities as an actress, she devoted herself to writing. Initially she published mainly in journals, but from the second half of the 1920s some of her books were published. She is the author of sixteen novels, ten children books, seven poetry collections and ten plays. Some of her works were also made into movies. The main topic of her books is the role of woman in the modern world. Her marriage to Karel Čapek deeply influenced her acting career, as well as her literary works.

Olga Scheinpflugová suffered a heart attack in April 1968, directly on the stage, during her performance in the play Mother by her husband Karel Čapek.

== Selected works ==
- Madla z cihelny (Madla from the Brickyard) (1933)
- Okénko (Small Window) (1933)
- Andula vyhrála (Andula Won) (1938)
- Švadlenka (Needlewoman) (1936)
- Dobře situovaný pán (A Comfortably Situated Man) (1939)
- Sobota (Saturday) (1944)
- Český román (Czech Novel) (1946) – autobiographical novel
- Byla jsem na světě – unfinished memoirs, published posthumously (1988)
