= Man in Demand on All Sides =

- Directed by: Miroslav Cikán
- Based on: A play by Hans Jaray
- Starring: Ljuba Hermanová, Věra Ferbasová, and Lída Baarová
- Cinematography: Jan Stallich
- Production company: Lepka
- Release date: 1934
- Running time: 85 minutes
- Country: Czechoslovakia
- Language: Czech

Man in Demand on All Sides (Pán na roztrhání) is a 1934 Czechoslovak film, directed by Miroslav Cikán. It stars Ljuba Hermanová, Věra Ferbasová, and Lída Baarová.

== Cast ==
- Ljuba Hermanová as Rita
- Věra Ferbasová as Slávka
- Lída Baarová as Eva Svobová
- František Černý
- František Smolík as Karel Svarc
- Jan W. Speerger
- Nora Stallich
- Václav Trégl as Komorník Filip
- Josef Zezulka as Assistant in the Avion Factory
