= Dobře situovaný pán =

- Directed by: Miroslav Cikán
- Starring: Jaroslav Marvan, Antonie Nedošinská, and Věra Ferbasová.
- Production company: Nationalfilm
- Release date: 1939
- Countries: Protectorate of Bohemia and Moravia

Dobře situovaný pán is a 1939 Czech film, directed by Miroslav Cikán. It stars Jaroslav Marvan, Antonie Nedošinská, and Věra Ferbasová.
