= The Dashing Archduke =

1927 film

- Directed by: Robert Land
- Written by: Ladislaus Vajda
- Cinematography: Curt Courant
- Production company: Peter Ostermayr Produktion
- Release date: 14 January 1927
- Countries: Austria; Germany
- Languages: Silent; German intertitles

The Dashing Archduke (German:Der fesche Erzherzog) is a 1927 Austrian-German silent film directed by Robert Land. The film's art direction was by Carl Ludwig Kirmse.

== Cast ==
- Liane Haid
- Ellen Kürti
- Oskar Marion
- Albert Paulig
- Hans Mierendorff
- Fritz Spira
- Ernst Winar

== Bibliography ==
- Hans-Michael Bock and Tim Bergfelder. The Concise Cinegraph: An Encyclopedia of German Cinema. Berghahn Books.
