= The Day the Tree Blooms =

1971 drama film

- Directed by: Václav Krska
- Screenplay by: Václav Krška; Jirí Cirkl
- Starring: Bedřich Vrbský
- Cinematography: Josef Illík
- Edited by: Jan Kohout; Jarmila Müllerová
- Music by: Jarmil Burghauser
- Release date: 1961
- Language: Czech

The Day the Tree Blooms (Czech: Kde reky mají slunce) is a 1961 Czechoslovak drama film directed by Václav Krska. Based on the novel Nejkrásnější svět by Marie Majerová, it entered the main competition at the 22nd edition of the Venice Film Festival.

== Cast ==
- Bedrich Vrbský as Miller Bilanský
- Karel Hlusicka as Antonin
- Zuzana Fisárková as Lenka
- Jaroslava Tichá as Maria
- Míla Myslíková as Anna
- Gabriela Vránová as Betka
- Vilém Besser as Jirí Hladík
- Ludek Munzar as Borek
- Jan Pohan as Jarus
