= Pio Campa =

Italian stage and film actor

- Born: 1881; Florence, Tuscany, Italy
- Died: 1964 (aged 82–83); Italy
- Occupation: Actor
- Years active: 1914–1954 (film)

Pio Campa (1881–1964) was an Italian stage and film actor. He was married to the actress Wanda Capodaglio.

== Selected filmography ==
- Paradise (1932)
- I Don't Know You Anymore (1936)
- The Two Orphans (1942)
- Jealousy (1942)
- La Fornarina (1944)

== Bibliography ==
- Susan Bassnett & Jennifer Lorch. Luigi Pirandello in the Theatre. Routledge, 2014.
