= Silvery Wind =

1954 Czech film

- Directed by: Václav Krška
- Written by: Václav Krška
- Based on: Stříbrný vítr by Fráňa Šrámek
- Starring: Eduard Cupák; František Šlégr; Marie Brožová
- Narrated by: Karel Höger
- Cinematography: Ferdinand Pečenka
- Edited by: Jan Kohout
- Music by: Jiří Srnka
- Production company: Studio uměleckého filmu
- Distributed by: Rozdělovna filmů Československého státního filmu
- Release date: 30 November 1956
- Running time: 106 minutes
- Country: Czechoslovakia
- Language: Czech

Silvery Wind (Czech: Stříbrný vítr) is a 1954 Czech drama film directed by Václav Krška based on the novel Stříbrný vítr by Fráňa Šrámek.

== Cast ==
- Eduard Cupák as Student Jan Ratkin
- František Šlégr as Rudolf Ratkin
- Marie Brožová as Jarmila Ratkinová
- Radovan Lukavský as Uncle Jiří
- Vladimír Ráž as Professor Ramler
- Bedřich Vrbský as Catechist
- Jana Rybářová as Anička Karasová
- Josef Vinklář as Student Franta Valenta
- Oldřich Slavík as Student Hugo Staněk
- Jaroslav Wagner as Majer
- Ilja Racek as Vika
- Miloš Kopecký as Lt. Gerlič

== Release ==
The film was released in cinemas on 30 November 1956.
