= Vandiny trampoty =

1938 Czech film by Miroslav Cikán

- Directed by: Miroslav Cikán
- Starring: Věra Ferbasová, Theodor Pištěk, and Jiří Dohnal.
- Production company: Moldavia Film
- Release date: 1938
- Country: Czechoslovakia

Vandiny trampoty is a 1938 Czechoslovak comedy film, directed by Miroslav Cikán. It stars Věra Ferbasová, Theodor Pištěk, and Jiří Dohnal.
