= La Fornarina (film) =

- Directed by: Enrico Guazzoni
- Written by: Tullio Gramantieri; Alberto Casella; Giorgio Pastina; Tomaso Smith
- Story by: Tullio Gramantieri; Sem Benelli
- Starring: Lída Baarová
- Cinematography: Giuseppe La Torre
- Music by: Ezio Carabella; Giuseppe Savagnone
- Release date: October 1944
- Language: Italian

La Fornarina (i.e. "The baker's daughter") is a 1944 Italian historical drama film directed by Enrico Guazzoni and starring Lída Baarová. It is loosely based on real life events of Raphael's model Margarita Luti.

== Plot ==
Renaissance Rome: the young painter Raffaello Sanzio meets Margherita, a girl of the people, makes her his model for the painting "La fornarina", becomes her lover and will live with her. The girl will also inspire some Madonnas, but this relationship arouses the jealousies of a beautiful aristocrat who secretly orders the kidnapping of the girl. Raphael falls into a state of prostration and does everything to track down Margherita; but when he finds it again it is too late because, undermined in physical and moral, he undergoes a collapse that leads to his death, on the very day of the Good Friday procession.

== Cast ==
- Lída Baarová as Margherita
- Walter Lazzaro as Raphael
- Anneliese Uhlig as Eleonora d'Este
- Loredana as Maria Dovizi
- Luigi Pavese as Sebastiano del Piombo
- Amilcare Pettinelli as Agostino Chigi
- Ugo Sasso as Marzio Taddei
- Giorgio Costantini as Giulio Romano
- Vinicio Sofia as Baviera
- Cesare Fantoni as Cardinal Bernardo Dovizi da Bibbiena
- Pio Campa as Pope Julius II
- Nino Marchesini as Governor of Rome
- Amina Pirani Maggi as mamma Rosa
- Ernesto Zanon as Bramante
- Cesare Polesello as Master Timoteo
- Amalia Pellegrini as Marozia
- Umberto Spadaro as Client at the Tavern
