= Andula Won =

- Directed by: Miroslav Cikán
- Written by: Olga Scheinpflugová; Josef Neuberg; Jaroslav Mottl
- Starring: Věra Ferbasová
- Cinematography: Karl Degl
- Edited by: Antonín Zelenka
- Release date: 2 December 1937
- Running time: 88 minutes
- Country: Czechoslovakia
- Language: Czech

Andula Won (Czech: Andula vyhrála) is a Czech comedy film directed by Miroslav Cikán, based on a novel by Olga Scheinpflugová. It was released in 1937.

== Plot summary ==
Pavel Haken, a young wealthy factory owner, is a bachelor and his mother is looking for a suitable bride for him. But Pavel is not keen on getting married. He decides to spend his summer holiday in a secluded cabin in the middle of the woods, "alone" only with his mother, his servant Václav and his dog Ferda. However, fate (and Pavel's mother) causes that a summer camp of the women's tennis club (of which some of Pavel's admirers are members) is set up on his land not far from the cabin. When Pavel finds out, he wants to leave immediately, but then he meets Andula, the camp cook, and changes his plans. He falls in love with Andula and after the summer holidays he marries her. Little does he know that she has made a bet with the rich ladies from the club that she will win him for herself, which will win her 30,000 crowns from the club members. After returning from his honeymoon elsewhere in Europe, Pavel learns about the bet in a phone call from one of the disgraced former admirers. Pavel becomes angry with Andula over the bet and in a rage throws her out of the house. Andula leaves and returns to her father's apartment. She uses the money she won to start a perfume shop. Business is good and when Pavel's mother visits her after some time, she finds out that Andula has not only become a successful businesswoman, but also the mother of Pavel's twin sons. Pavel reconciles with Andula and takes her back to his home.

== Cast ==
- Věra Ferbasová - Andula Mráčková
- Hugo Haas - Pavel Haken
- Růžena Šlemrová - Hakenová (Pavel's Mother)
- Václav Trégl - Václav (Servant)
- Saša Rašilov - Mráček (Andula's Father)
- Stanislav Neumann - Tonda Mráček (Andula's Brother)
- Milada Smolíková - Aunt Kristýnka
- Anna Steimarová - T.O.Z.K. Club Directress
- Fanda Mrázek - Tramp
- Gustav Hilmar - Richard Kalous
- Marie Grossová - Kalous' Wife
- Eva Prchlíková - Gisela Kalousová
- Vlasta Hrubá - Sylvie Símová
- Milada Gampeová - Sylvie's Mother
- Dagmar Vondrová - Sylvie's Friend
