= The Seamstress (1936 film) =

1936 film

- Věra Ferbasová and Lída Baarová
- Directed by: Martin Frič
- Screenplay by: Václav Wasserman
- Story by: Olga Scheinpflugová
- Starring: Lída Baarová; Theodor Pištěk; Hugo Haas
- Cinematography: Ferdinand Pečenka
- Edited by: Jan Kohout
- Music by: Julius Kalaš
- Production company: UFA
- Distributed by: UFA
- Release date: 27 November 1936
- Running time: 87 minutes
- Country: Czechoslovakia
- Language: Czech

The Seamstress (Czech: Švadlenka) is a 1936 German comedy film, produced in Czechoslovakia at the A-B Film Studio with a Czech cast and crew and in the Czech language, by the German film company UFA. It was directed by Martin Frič and starring Lída Baarová, Theodor Pištěk and Hugo Haas.

The film's sets were designed by the art director Štěpán Kopecký.

== Cast ==
- Lída Baarová as Líza Bártová (as Ludmila Babková)
- Theodor Pištěk as Bárta
- Hugo Haas as Francois Lorrain
- Bedřich Veverka as Alfons
- Adina Mandlová as Mici
- Růžena Šlemrová as Salon owner Yvette
- Věra Ferbasová as Tonka
- Václav Trégl as Houžvička
- Vladimír Borský as Jan Tomáš Krejčí
- Felix Kühne as Journalist
- Jaroslav Marvan as Professor
- Eduard Šimáček as Journalist
