= Dalibor (film) =

1956 film

- Directed by: Václav Krška
- Written by: Josef Wenzig (libretto); Václav Krška (screenplay)
- Starring: Václav Bednár
- Cinematography: Ferdinand Pečenka
- Music by: Bedřich Smetana
- Release date: 1956
- Country: Czechoslovakia
- Language: Czech

Dalibor is a 1956 Czech film rendering of the opera of the same name by Bedřich Smetana. Directed by Václav Krška, the film was entered into the 1956 Cannes Film Festival.

== Cast ==
- Václav Bednář as King Vladislav
- Karel Fiala as Dalibor
- Věra Heroldová as Milada
- Přemysl Kočí as Budivoj
- Josef Celerin as Beneš
- Josef Rousar as Vítek
- Jana Rybářová as Jitka
- Milo Červinka as Zdenek
- Luděk Munzar
