= The Comedian's Princess =

- Directed by: Miroslav Cikán
- Screenplay by: Emanuel Brožík; Miroslav Cikán; Jan Gerstel
- Starring: Jaroslav Vojta; Lída Baarová; Otomar Korbelář.
- Cinematography: Ferdinand Pečenka
- Edited by: Antonín Zelenka
- Music by: Eman Fiala; Julius Kalas
- Production company: Ufa
- Distributed by: Ufa
- Release date: 1936
- Running time: 92 minutes
- Country: Czechoslovakia
- Language: Czech

The Comedian's Princess (Komediantská princezna) is a 1936 Czechoslovak comedy film, directed by Miroslav Cikán.

== Cast ==
- Jaroslav Vojta as Puppeteer Kratochvíl
- Lída Baarová as Eva Kratochvílová
- Otomar Korbelář as Factory owner Dvorský
- Jára Kohout as Mayor Pivoňka
- Věra Ferbasová as Táňa
- Ladislav Pešek as Ferda Sekanina
- Adina Mandlová as Lexová
- Jaroslav Marvan as Lawyer
