= The Doll (1938 film) =

1938 film

- Directed by: Robert Land
- Written by: Jan Grmela; Robert Land
- Produced by: František Jerhot
- Starring: Ferenc Futurista; Věra Ferbasová
- Cinematography: Ferdinand Pečenka
- Edited by: Gina Hašler
- Music by: Jára Beneš
- Production company: Metropolitan
- Distributed by: Metropolitan
- Release date: 31 March 1938
- Running time: 90 minutes
- Country: Czechoslovakia
- Language: Czech

The Doll (Czech: Panenka) is a 1938 Czech comedy film directed by Robert Land. It was Land's last movie. He escaped to France in 1938 and died there in 1940.

A German language version of the film was shot simultaneously by Josef Medeotti-Boháč. It was released under the name Robot Girl Nr. 1, but today it's considered lost.

== Cast ==
- Ferenc Futurista as Officer Bedřich Vrba
- Milada Gampeová as Vrba's wife
- Jiří Dohnal as Kajetán Vrba
- Věra Ferbasová Věra
- Josef Gruss as Industrialist Antonín Dominik
- Milka Balek-Brodská as Adéla Dominiková
- Zdeněk Hora as Sculptor Jaroslav Výr
- Ljuba Hermanová as Výr's girlfriend Hella
- Světla Svozilová as Journalist Maryna Tečková
- Stanislav Neumann as Detective Liška

== Reception ==
The film was commercially successful, but it was panned by critics.
