= Stříbrné Hory =

- Municipality
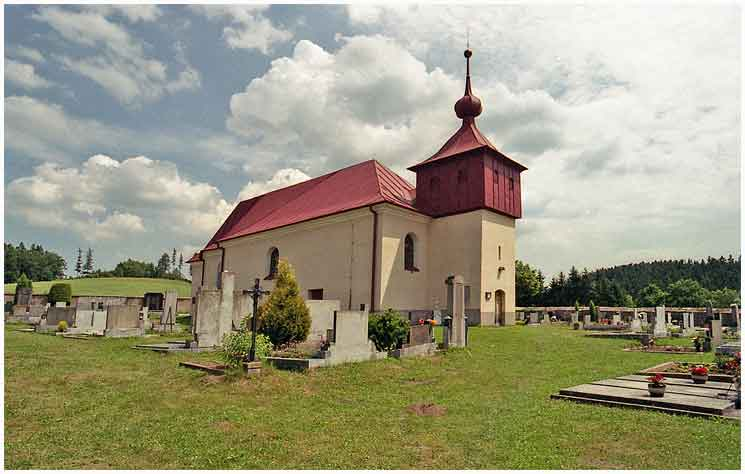
- Church of Saint Catherine

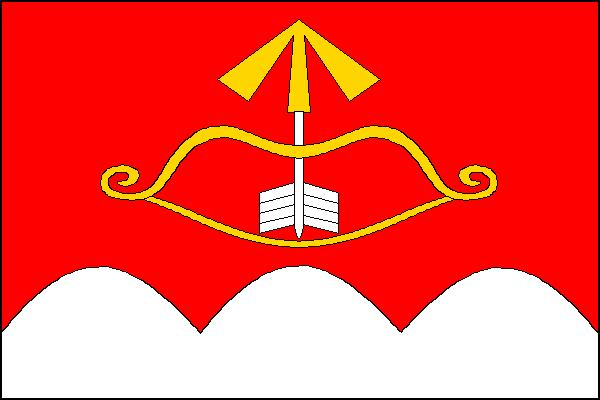
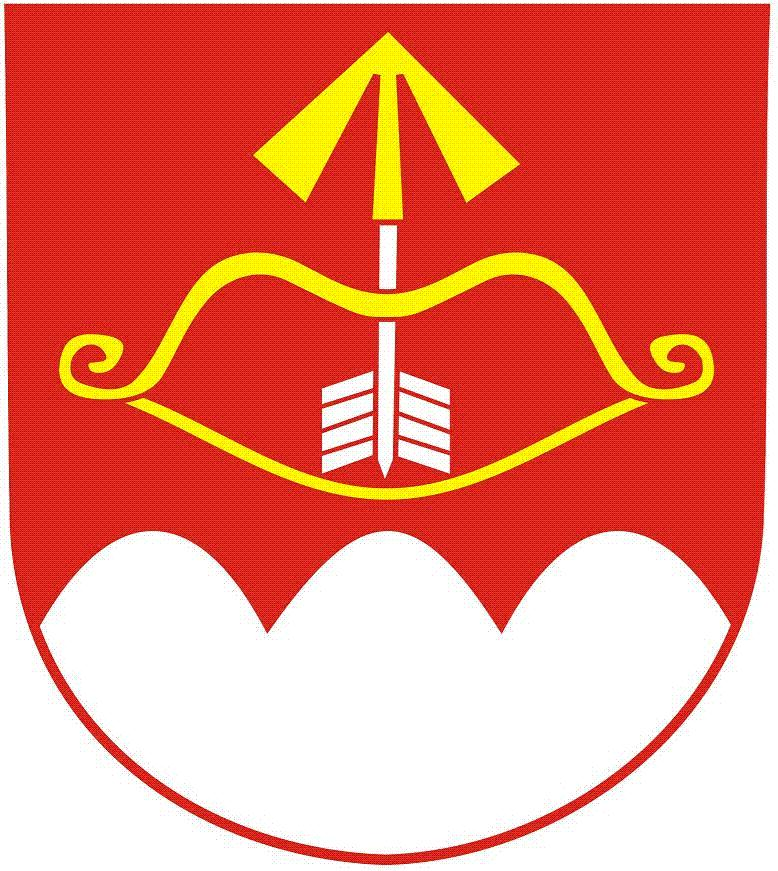
- Flag Coat of arms

- Location in the Czech Republic
- Coordinates: 49°36′5″N 15°41′28″E
- Country: Czech Republic
- Region: Vysočina
- District: Havlíčkův Brod
- First mentioned: 1654

Area
  - Total: 3.75 km^{2} (1.45 sq mi)
- Elevation: 473 m (1,552 ft)

Population (2026-01-01)
  - Total: 245
  - Density: 65.3/km^{2} (169/sq mi)
- Time zone: UTC+1 (CET)
  - Summer (DST): UTC+2 (CEST)
- Postal code: 582 22
- Website: www.stribrnehory.cz

Stříbrné Hory (until 1947 Český Šicndorf; German: Böhmisch Schützendorf) is a municipality and village in Havlíčkův Brod District in the Vysočina Region of the Czech Republic. It has about 200 inhabitants.

Stříbrné Hory lies approximately 9 kilometres (6 mi) east of Havlíčkův Brod, 25 km (16 mi) north of Jihlava, and 106 km (66 mi) south-east of Prague.

== Demographics ==
Historical population
Year	Pop.	±%
1869	133	—
1880	295	+121.8%
1890	289	−2.0%
1900	324	+12.1%
1910	340	+4.9%
1921	312	−8.2%
1930	355	+13.8%
1950	312	−12.1%
1961	287	−8.0%
1970	307	+7.0%
1980	278	−9.4%
1991	253	−9.0%
2001	231	−8.7%
2011	251	+8.7%
2021	253	+0.8%
Source: Censuses
