= Kouty (Nymburk District) =

- Municipality
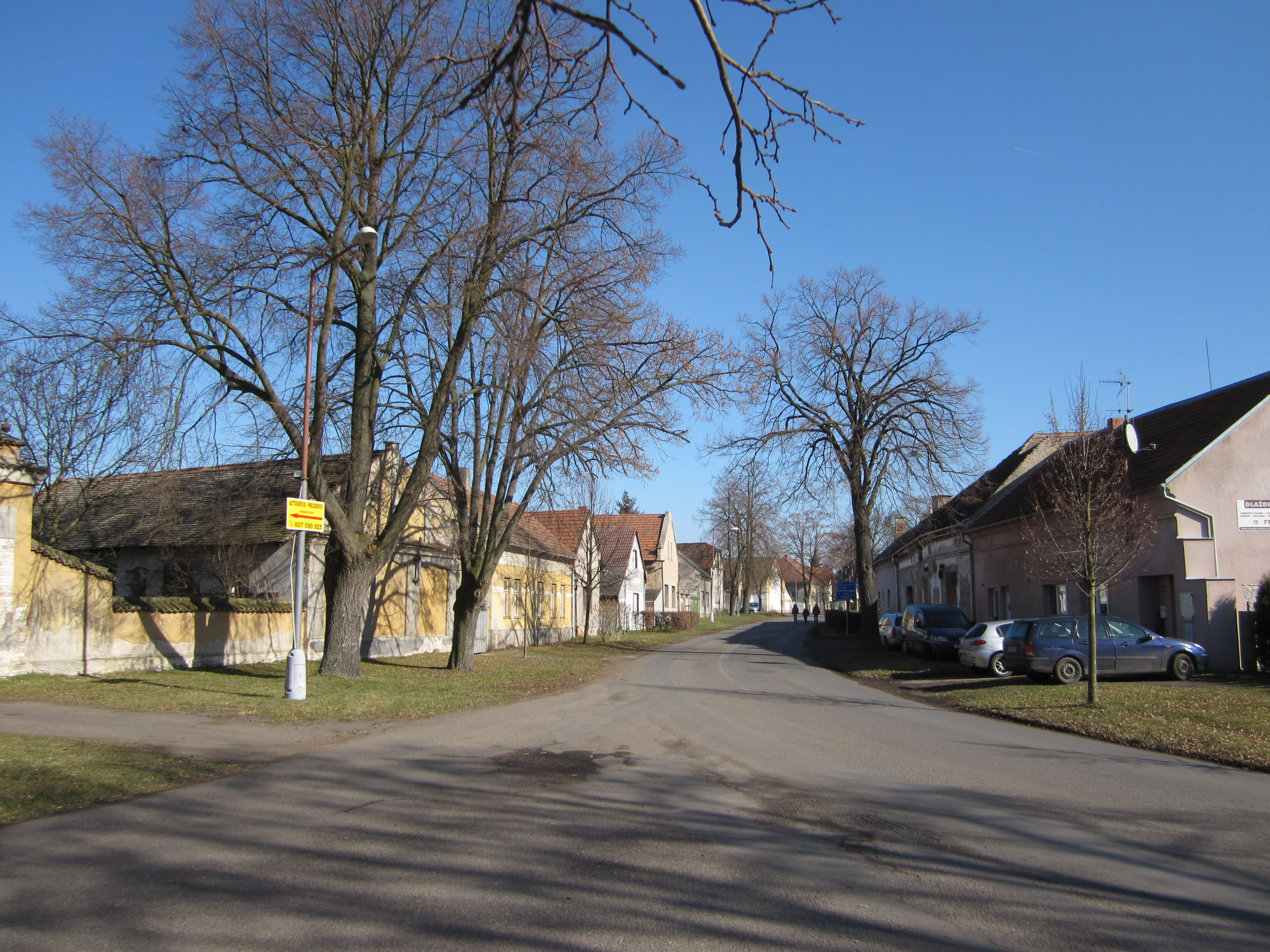
- Main street

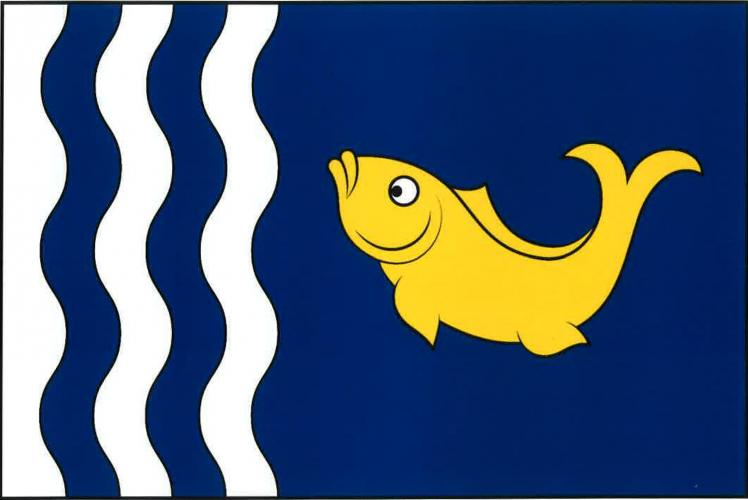
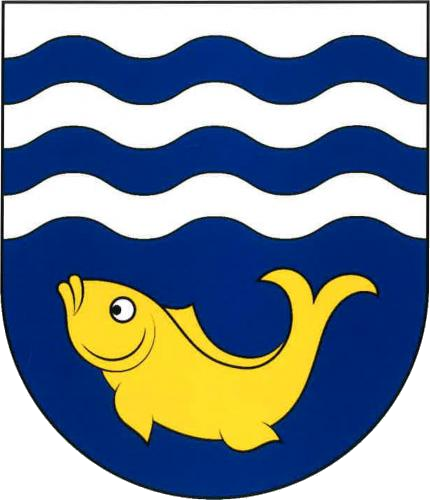
- Flag Coat of arms

- Location in the Czech Republic
- Coordinates: 50°11′35″N 15°8′56″E
- Country: Czech Republic
- Region: Central Bohemian
- District: Nymburk
- First mentioned: 1345

Area
  - Total: 5.59 km^{2} (2.16 sq mi)
- Elevation: 190 m (620 ft)

Population (2026-01-01)
  - Total: 337
  - Density: 60.3/km^{2} (156/sq mi)
- Time zone: UTC+1 (CET)
  - Summer (DST): UTC+2 (CEST)
- Postal code: 290 01
- Website: obec-kouty.kubrdom.cz

Kouty is a municipality and village in Nymburk District in the Central Bohemian Region of the Czech Republic. It has about 300 inhabitants.

== Etymology ==
The Czech word kout (plural kouty) means 'corner'. Places were often so named after the bend of a watercourse or after the narrow end of a meadow, and gradually changed from singular to plural.

== Geography ==
Kouty is located about 7 kilometres (4 mi) east of Nymburk and 45 km (28 mi) east of Prague. It lies in a flat agricultural landscape in the Central Elbe Table. The Blatnice Stream flows through the municipality.

== History ==
The first written mention of Kouty is from 1345.

== Demographics ==
Historical population

Year	Pop.	±%
1869	315	—
1880	357	+13.3%
1890	436	+22.1%
1900	469	+7.6%
1910	449	−4.3%

Year	Pop.	±%
1921	433	−3.6%
1930	482	+11.3%
1950	394	−18.3%
1961	376	−4.6%
1970	314	−16.5%

Year	Pop.	±%
1980	303	−3.5%
1991	270	−10.9%
2001	235	−13.0%
2011	286	+21.7%
2021	336	+17.5%

Source: Censuses

== Transport ==
There are no railways or major roads passing through the municipality.

== Sights ==
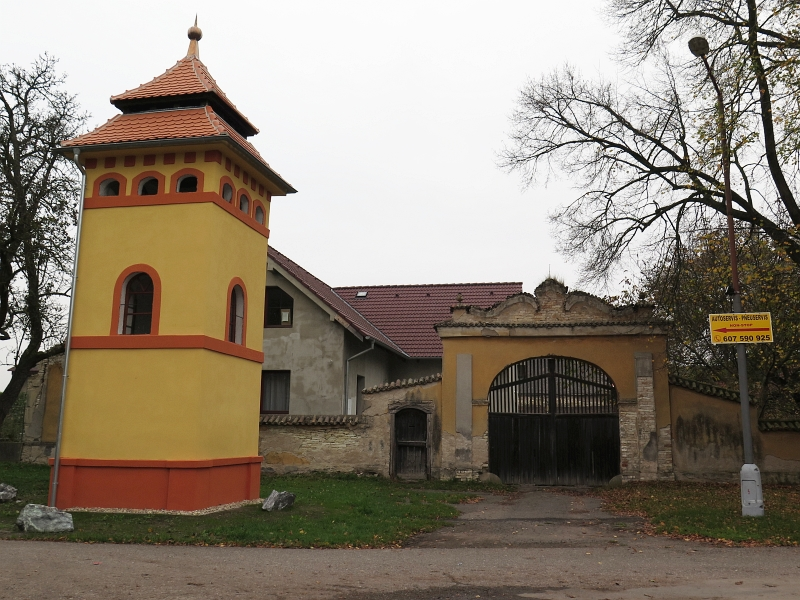
Belfry and the protected gate

Kouty is poor in monuments. The only protected cultural monuments are a Neoclassical homestead and a late Baroque gate to a homestead, both dating from the mid-19th century.
