= Sukorady (Mladá Boleslav District) =

- Municipality
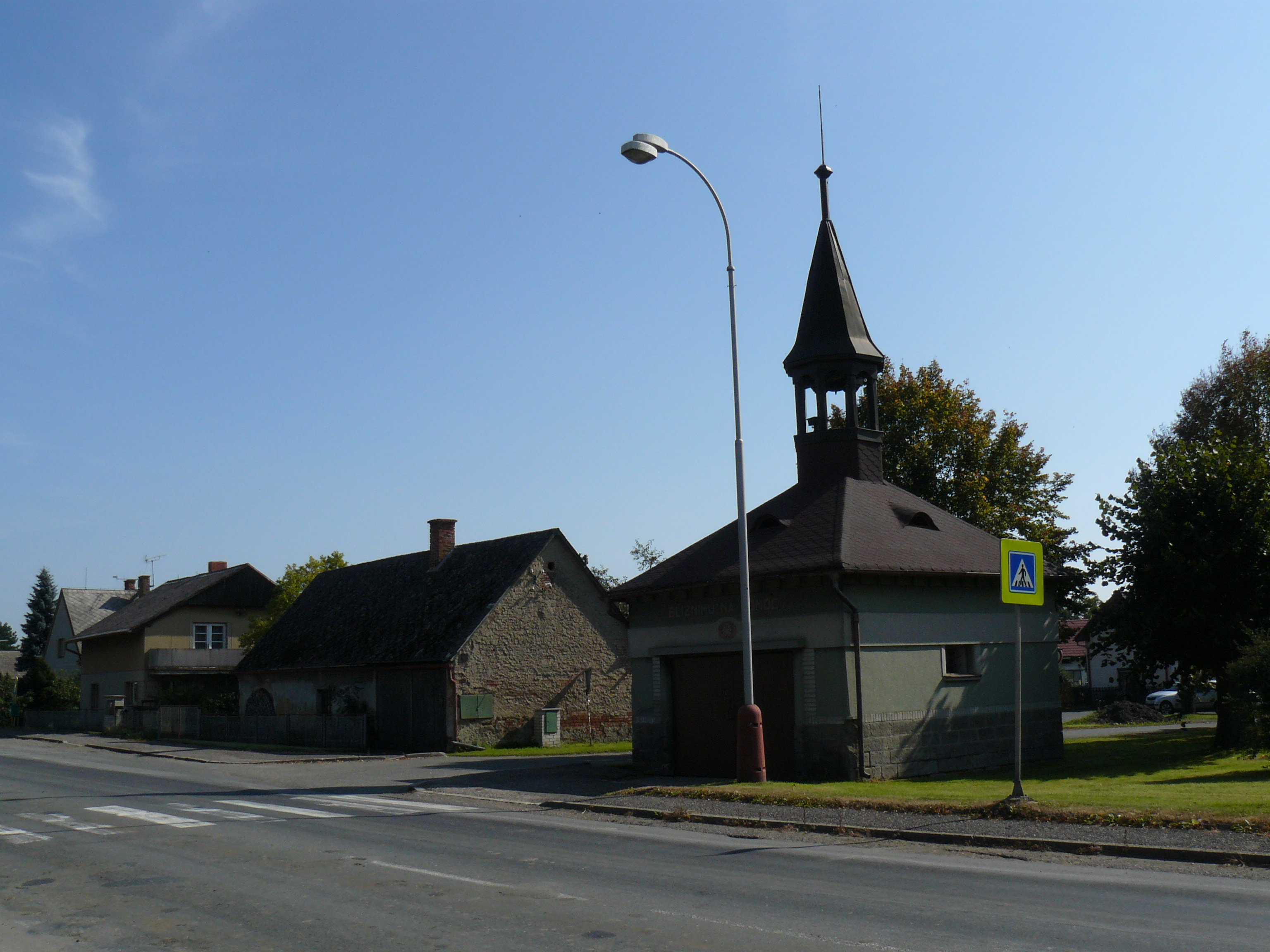
- Centre of Sukorady

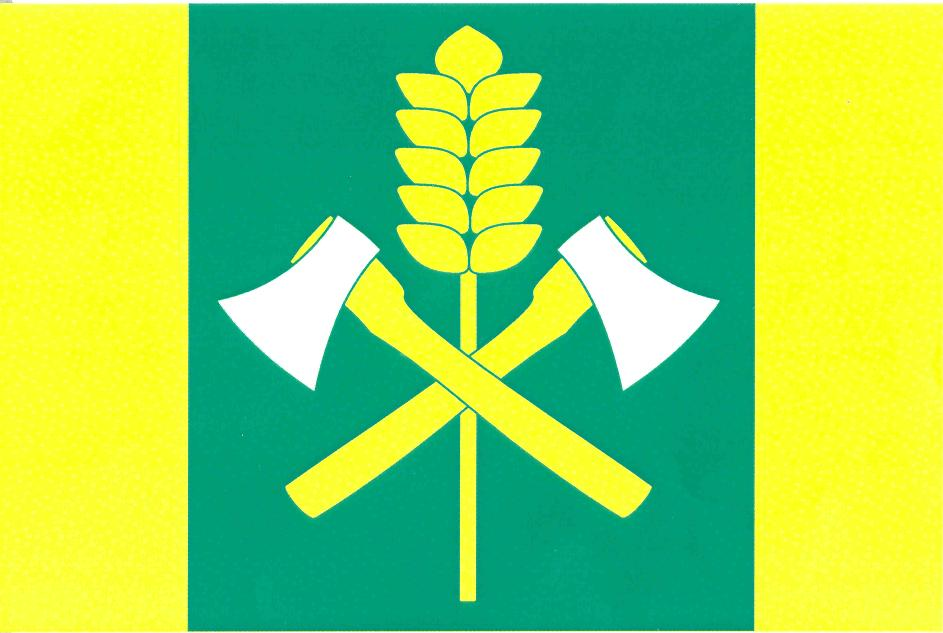
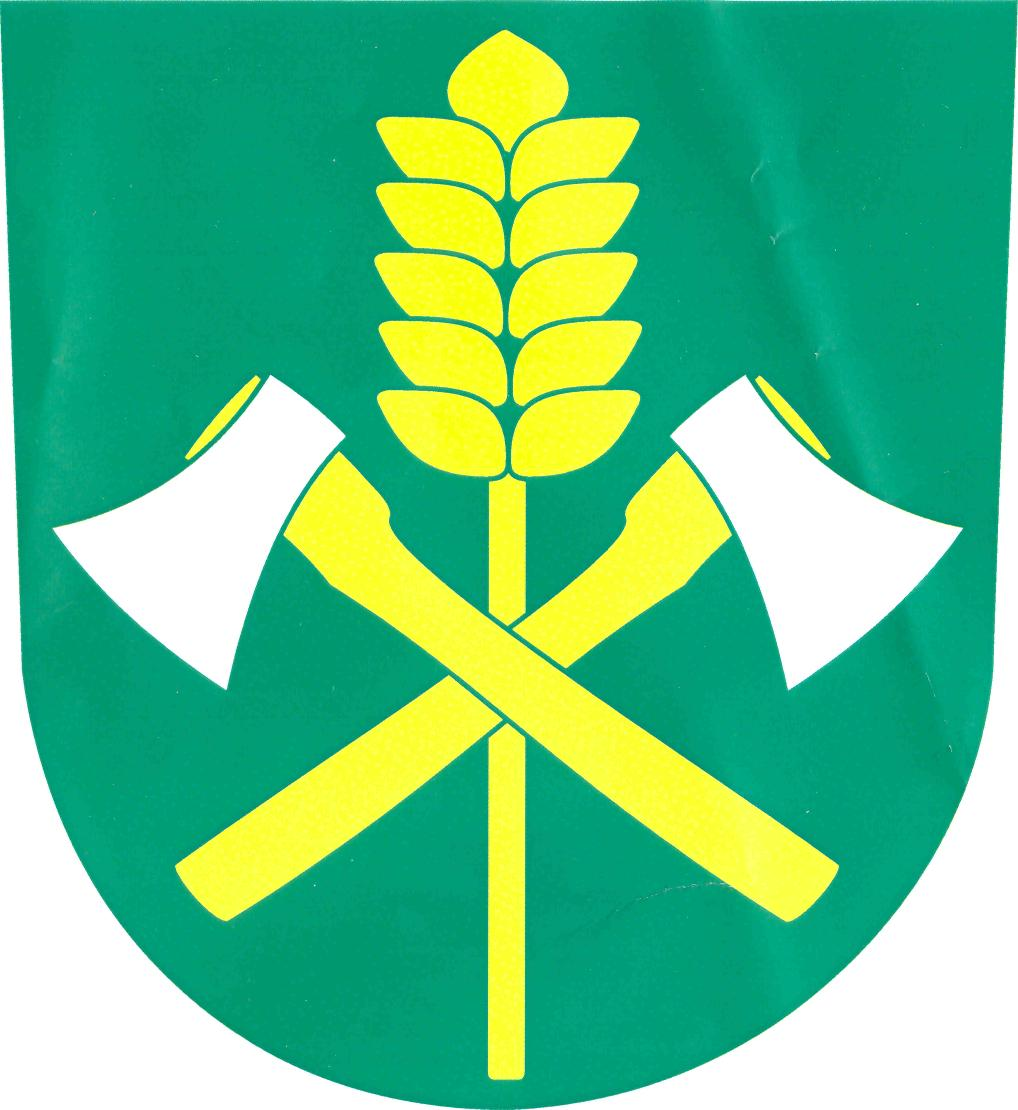
- Flag Coat of arms

- Location in the Czech Republic
- Coordinates: 50°25′35″N 15°1′45″E
- Country: Czech Republic
- Region: Central Bohemian
- District: Mladá Boleslav
- First mentioned: 1420

Area
  - Total: 5.44 km^{2} (2.10 sq mi)
- Elevation: 222 m (728 ft)

Population (2026-01-01)
  - Total: 385
  - Density: 70.8/km^{2} (183/sq mi)
- Time zone: UTC+1 (CET)
  - Summer (DST): UTC+2 (CEST)
- Postal code: 294 06
- Website: www.obec-sukorady.cz

Sukorady is a municipality and village in Mladá Boleslav District in the Central Bohemian Region of the Czech Republic. It has about 400 inhabitants.

== Administrative division ==
Sukorady consists of two municipal parts (in brackets population according to the 2021 census):

- Sukorady (311)
- Martinovice (69)

== Demographics ==
Historical population
| Year | Pop. | ±% |
|---|---|---|
| 1869 | 385 | — |
| 1880 | 367 | −4.7% |
| 1890 | 386 | +5.2% |
| 1900 | 375 | −2.8% |
| 1910 | 399 | +6.4% |
| 1921 | 417 | +4.5% |
| 1930 | 442 | +6.0% |
| 1950 | 362 | −18.1% |
| 1961 | 345 | −4.7% |
| 1970 | 331 | −4.1% |
| 1980 | 273 | −17.5% |
| 1991 | 238 | −12.8% |
| 2001 | 270 | +13.4% |
| 2011 | 348 | +28.9% |
| 2021 | 380 | +9.2% |
Source: Censuses
