= Kouty (Havlíčkův Brod District) =

- Municipality
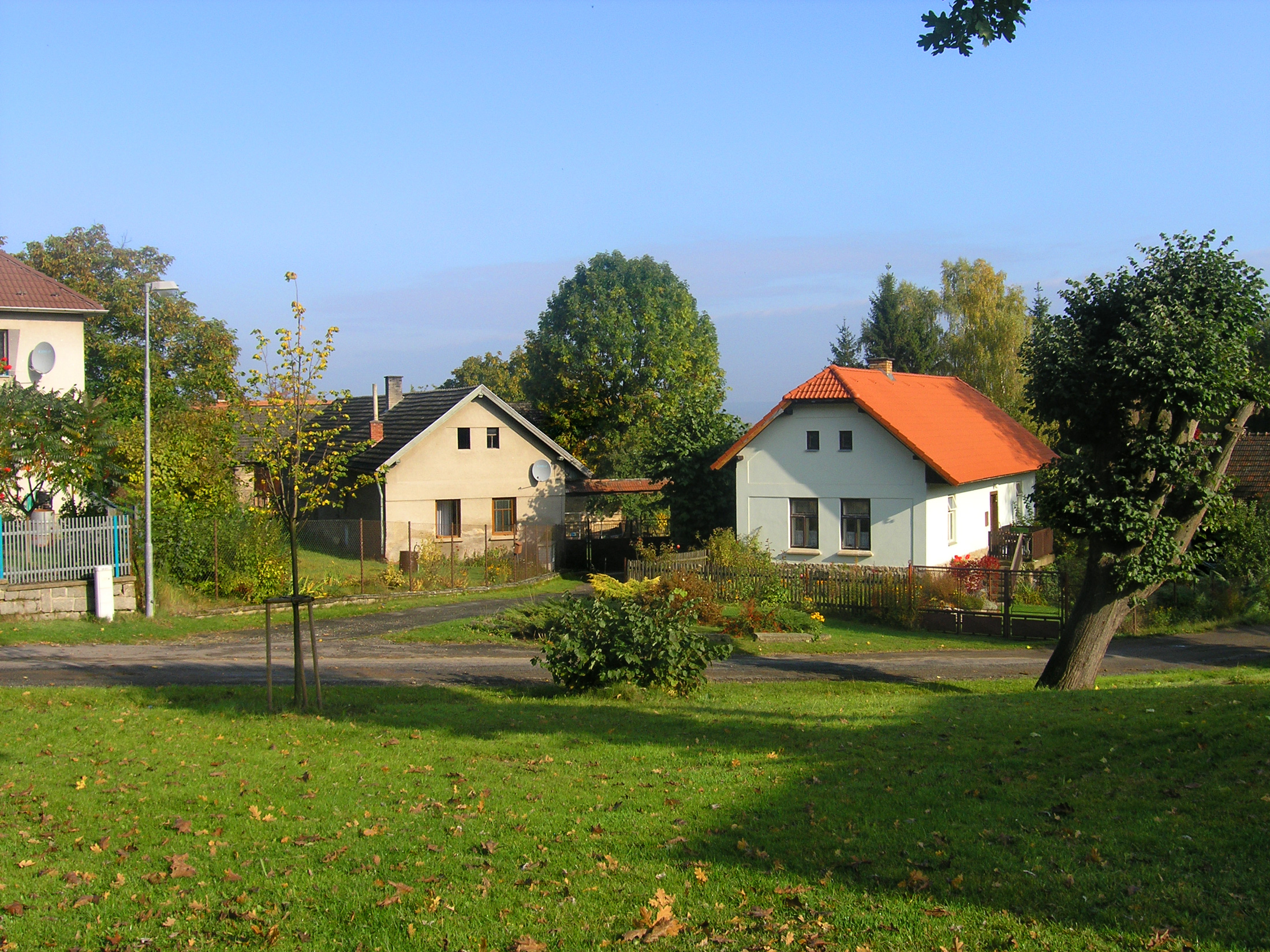
- Centre of Kouty

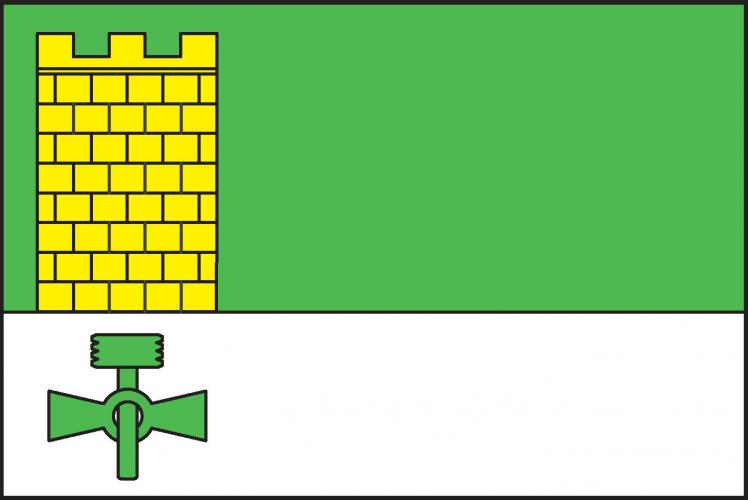
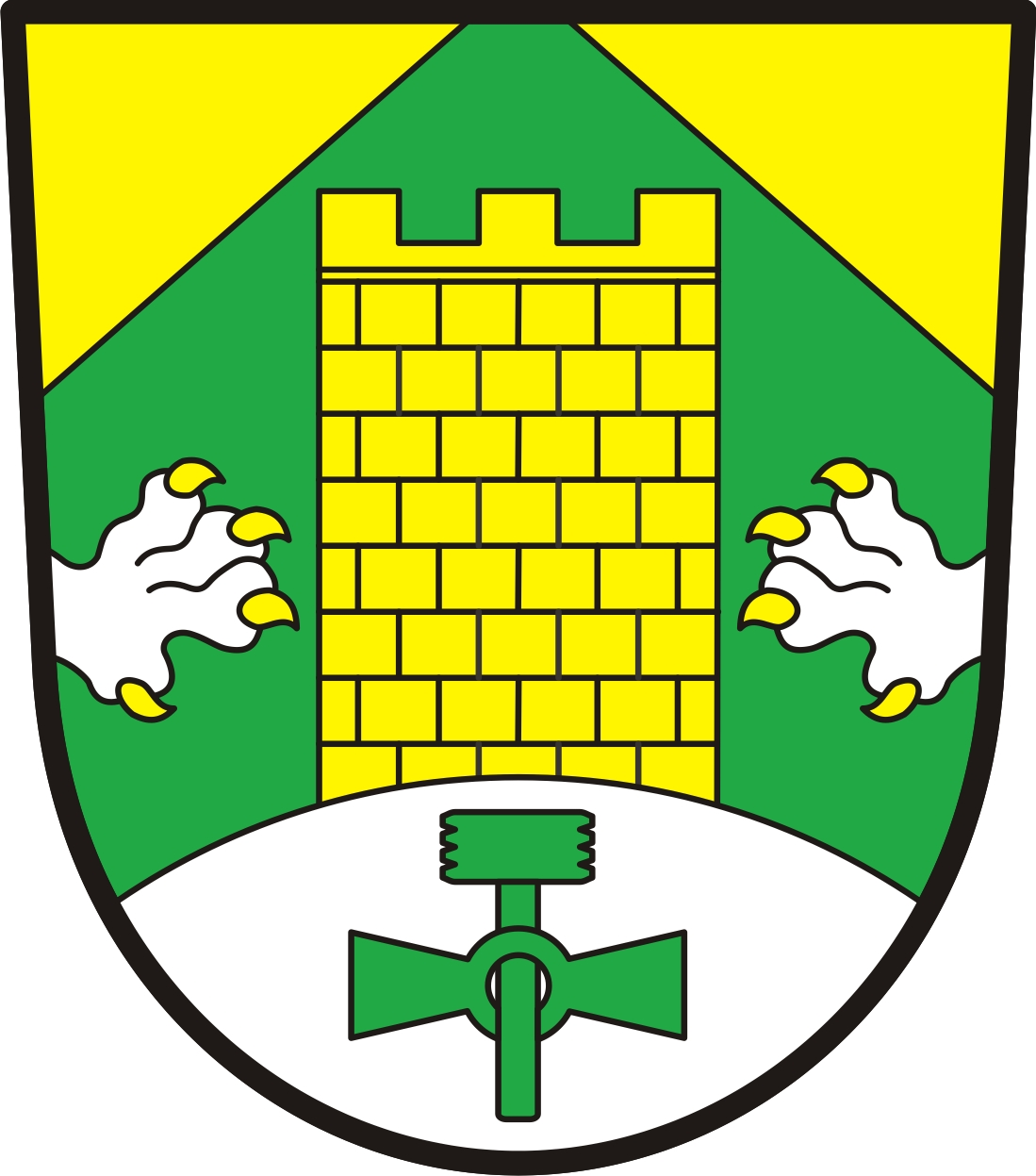
- Flag Coat of arms

- Location in the Czech Republic
- Coordinates: 49°38′56″N 15°17′35″E
- Country: Czech Republic
- Region: Vysočina
- District: Havlíčkův Brod
- First mentioned: 1318

Area
  - Total: 3.72 km^{2} (1.44 sq mi)
- Elevation: 497 m (1,631 ft)

Population (2026-01-01)
  - Total: 196
  - Density: 52.7/km^{2} (136/sq mi)
- Time zone: UTC+1 (CET)
  - Summer (DST): UTC+2 (CEST)
- Postal code: 584 01
- Website: www.kouty-ledecsko.cz

Kouty is a municipality and village in Havlíčkův Brod District in the Vysočina Region of the Czech Republic. It has about 200 inhabitants.

Kouty lies approximately 21 kilometres (13 mi) west of Havlíčkův Brod, 35 km (22 mi) north-west of Jihlava, and 80 km (50 mi) south-east of Prague.

== Demographics ==
Historical population
Year	Pop.	±%
1869	274	—
1880	312	+13.9%
1890	346	+10.9%
1900	342	−1.2%
1910	386	+12.9%
1921	356	−7.8%
1930	343	−3.7%
1950	230	−32.9%
1961	246	+7.0%
1970	241	−2.0%
1980	205	−14.9%
1991	175	−14.6%
2001	195	+11.4%
2011	200	+2.6%
2021	197	−1.5%
Source: Censuses
