= Lída Baarová =

Czech actress and mistress of Joseph Goebbels (1914–2000)

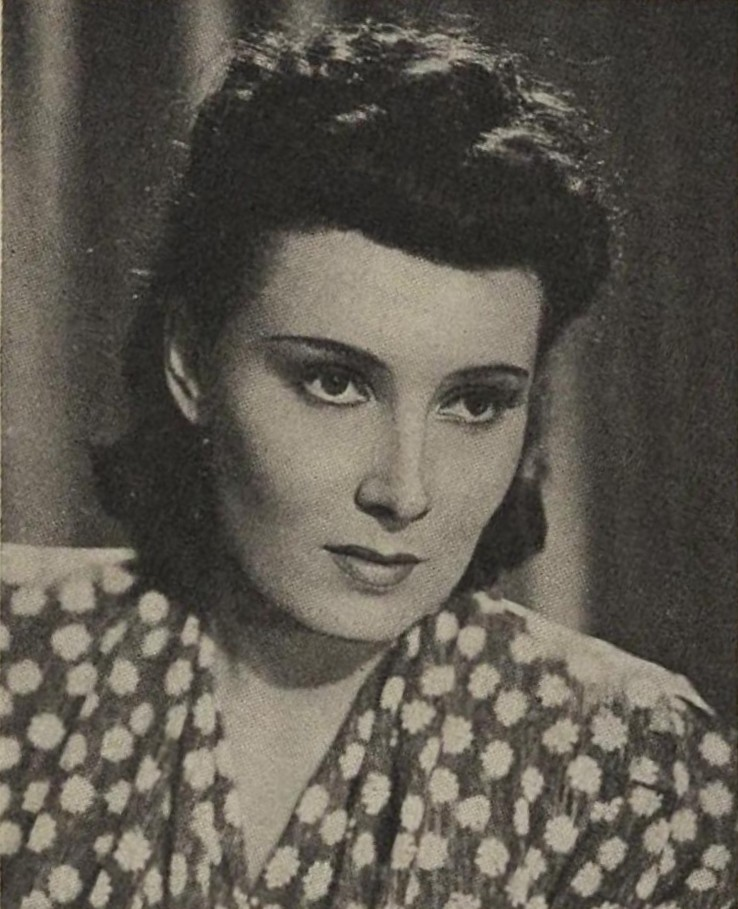
- Baarová in 1940
- Born: Ludmila Babková; 7 September 1914; Prague, Kingdom of Bohemia, Austria-Hungary
- Died: 27 October 2000 (aged 86); Salzburg, Austria
- Years active: 1931–1970
- Spouses: Jan Kopecky (m. 1947; div. 1956); Kurt Lundwall (m. 1969; died 1972)

Lída Baarová (born Ludmila Babková; 7 September 1914 – 27 October 2000) was a Czechoslovak actress.

== Biography ==
=== Life and career ===
Born in Prague, Baarová studied acting at the city's Conservatory and received her first film role in the Czechoslovak film Pavel Čamrda's Career (Kariéra Pavla Čamrdy) at the age of 17. Her mother sang in a choir and appeared in several theatre plays; her younger sister, Zorka Janů (1921–1946), also became a film actress. In 1934, Baarová left Prague for Berlin after winning a contest at the UFA film studios for a role in the film Barcarole. She met Adolf Hitler that year and he told her, "You look like someone who played a major role in my life, a very significant role". Hitler was referring to his niece, Geli Raubal.

In Berlin, she made a successful appearance in Barcarole (1935), along with the German actor Gustav Fröhlich (1902–1987). She and Fröhlich, meanwhile divorced from the Hungarian opera singer Gitta Alpár, became lovers and starred together in several films. Baarová also performed on stage at the Deutsches Theater and the Volksbühne. She received several job offers from Hollywood studios. She turned them down under pressure from the Nazi authorities, but later regretted it and claimed to her biographer, Josef Škvorecký: "I could have been as famous as Marlene Dietrich."

After her engagement to Fröhlich, the couple moved to Schwanenwerder island on the outskirts of Berlin, where their house was close to the residence of Joseph Goebbels, a leading member in the Nazi government of Hitler with a decisive voice in German film production and Nazi cinema. Baarová, still working for the UFA studios, met him when Goebbels visited Fröhlich's home in 1936. Gradually, they became closer and, under the urging of Goebbels, started a relationship that lasted over two years. Their love affair caused serious complications between Goebbels and his wife Magda. When the minister began to show up in public with his mistress, Magda Goebbels in turn began an affair with Goebbels' state secretary Karl Hanke and eventually asked Hitler for permission to divorce her husband. According to Baarová's own statements, she herself, fearing Goebbels' wounded pride, approached the dictator for help.

Hitler intervened on 16 August 1938 and rebuked his minister, stating that in view of his "perfect marriage" as well as the coming annexation of the Sudetenland, his affair with a Czech actress was an impossibility. Baarová was told by the Berlin chief of police Wolf-Heinrich von Helldorff that she had to quit her relationship with Goebbels immediately and was prohibited from performing on Hitler's direct order. Her recently completed film A Prussian Love Story, which depicted the love affair between Wilhelm I and the Polish princess Elisa Radziwill, and was a thinly veiled reference to Goebbels and Baarová, was banned, and not shown in theatres until 1950 as Liebeslegende ("Story of Love"). Paid shills yelled out "Get out, minister's whore" when Baarová's character appeared on the screen at the premiere of Der Spieler ("The Gambler"), and did not stop until the showing was halted. The film's run was ended and the actress had a nervous breakdown. She tried to contact friends in Hollywood, with an eye to going there, but Hitler told her that she could not leave the country. Followed by the Gestapo wherever she went, ordered by Helldorf to stop making public appearances, and pressed by her friends, in the winter of 1938–39 Baarová fled back to Prague. There, she was temporarily allowed to perform under German occupation and, in 1942, moved to Italy, where she starred in such films as Grazia (1943), La Fornarina (1944), Vivere ancora (1945) and others.

After Allied troops occupied Italy, she had to return to Prague. In April 1945, however, Baarová left Prague for Germany again. On the way, she was taken into custody by the American military police, imprisoned in Munich, and later extradited to Czechoslovakia.

=== Post-war years ===
In Czechoslovakia in 1945, Baarová and her family were taken into custody on suspicion of collaboration with the Germans during the war. Her mother died under interrogation; her sister Zorka committed suicide in 1946. She herself was released after 18 months of custody due to lack of evidence. She had never been convicted nor sentenced. While in custody, she was often visited by the puppeteer Jan Kopecký and they eventually married on 27 July 1947. Kopecký was a close relative of Václav Kopecký, a prominent politician in the post-war government of Czechoslovakia. Kopecký's prominent relative did not approve of the marriage and Kopecký lost his job as a result. Kopecký emigrated to Argentina, leaving Lída behind to recuperate in the sanatorium of Dr. Lundwall.

In Austria in 1949, the actress attempted a comeback, but when the Austrian-British actor Anton Walbrook withdrew from a film where he was cast with her, she left for Argentina to escape the resulting negative media. Living in extreme poverty, she decided to return to Italy. Her husband stayed in Argentina and they were divorced in 1956. Back in Italy, she appeared in several films, including Fellini's I Vitelloni (1953), where she played the wife of a rich merchant. In 1958, she moved to Salzburg, where she again performed on stage. She married Austrian physician Kurt Lundwall in 1969; he died in 1972 and is buried in Salzburg's Aigner Friedhof.

=== After the fall of Communism in Europe ===
In the 1990s, Baarová re-appeared on the cultural scene of the Czech Republic. She published her autobiography. A film, Lída Baarová's Bittersweet Memories, was released in 1995 and won an award at the 1996 Art Film Festival in Trenčianske Teplice, Slovakia.

=== Later life and death ===
Baarová suffered from Parkinson's disease and died in 2000 in Salzburg, while living alone on the estate she inherited after the death of her second husband, Dr. Lundwall. Her ashes were interred in Prague's Strašnice Cemetery, where she rests with her parents and her sister Zorka.

== In popular culture ==
In 2016, a dramatization of Baarová's life was set on film in The Devil's Mistress (Lída Baarová) by Filip Renč, with Tatiana Pauhofová starring as Baarová, Karl Marcovics as Goebbels, and David Novotný as UFA's head of production Ernst Hugo Correll. In 2024, Baarová was portrayed by Katia Fellin in Goebbels and the Führer.

== Filmography ==
- Obrácení Ferdyše Pištory ("Conversion of Fred Pištora", 1931)
- Kariéra Pavla Čamrdy ("Pavel Čamrda's Career", 1931)
- Zapadlí vlastenci ("Forgotten Patriots", 1932)
- Lelíček ve službách Sherlocka Holmese ("Lelíček in Sherlock Holmes' Service", 1932)
- Šenkýřka u divoké krásky ("Waitress at the Wild Beauty's Bar", 1932)
- Růžové kombiné ("The Pink Slip", 1932)
- Malostranští mušketýři ("Prague's Musketeers", 1932)
- Funebrák ("The Undertaker", 1932)
- Jsem děvče s čertem v těle ("Funky Girl", 1933)
- Madla z cihelny ("The Brickmaker's Daughter", 1933)
- Okénko ("The Window", 1933)
- Sedmá velmoc ("The Seventh Superpower", 1933)
- Její lékař ("The Physician", 1933)
- Pokušení paní Antonie ("Antonia's Temptation", 1934)
- Pán na roztrhání ("Man in Demand on All Sides", 1934)
- Na růžích ustláno ("Easy Life", 1934)
- Zlatá Kateřina ("Golden Kate", 1934)
- Dokud máš maminku ("As Long as your Mother is Alive", 1934)
- Grandhotel Nevada ("Grand Hotel Nevada", 1934)
- One Too Many on Board (1935)
- Leutnant Bobby, der Teufelskerl ("Lieutenant Bobby, the Daredevil", 1935)
- Barcarole ("Barcarolle", 1935)
- Verräter ("The Traitor", 1936)
- Die Stunde der Versuchung ("The Hour of Temptation", 1936)
- Švadlenka ("The Seamstress", 1936)
- Komediantská princezna ("The Comedian's Princess", 1936)
- Patrioten ("Patriots", 1937)
- Lidé na kře ("People on the Floating Ice", 1937)
- Panenství ("Virginity", 1937)
- Die Fledermaus ("The Bat", 1937)
- Der Spieler ("The Gambler", 1938)
- Preußische Liebesgeschichte ("A Prussian Love Story", 1938, banned; released in 1950 as Liebslegende "Story of Love")
- Maskovaná milenka ("The Masked Lover", 1939)
- Ohnivé léto ("Fiery Summer", 1939)
- Artur a Leontýna ("Arthur and Leontine", 1940)
- Život je krásný ("Life Is Beautiful", 1940)
- Dívka v modrém ("Girl in Blue", 1940)
- Za tichých nocí ("In the Still of the Night", 1941)
- Paličova dcera ("Arsonist's Daughter", 1941)
- Turbina ("Turbine", 1941)
- Grazia ("The Charming Beauty", 1943)
- Ti conosco, mascherina! ("Masked Girl, Recognised!", 1943)
- La Fornarina ("The Baker's Daughter", 1944)
- Il Cappello da prete ("The Priest's Hat", 1944)
- L'Ippocampo ("The Sea-Horse", 1944)
- Vivere ancora ("Still Alive", 1944)
- La sua strada ("Its Way", 1946)
- La bisarca ("The Car Transporter", 1950)
- Gli amanti di Ravello ("The Lovers of Ravello", 1950)
- Carne inquieta ("Restless", 1952)
- What Price Innocence? (1952)
- La vendetta di una pazza ("Revenge of a Crazy Girl", 1952)
- I Vitelloni ("The Bullocks", 1953)
- Pietà per chi cade ("Compassion", 1954)
- Miedo ("The Fear", 1956)
- La Mestiza ("The Mestiza", 1956)
- Viaje de novios ("Honeymoon", 1956)
- We're All Necessary (1956)
- 1956 Retorno a la verdad ("The Truth Will Set You Free")
- Rapsodia de sangre ("Ecstasy", 1957)
- El batallón de las sombras ("The Battalion in the Shadows", 1957)
- Il cielo brucia ("The Sky Burns", 1958)
- Života sladké hořkosti Lídy Baarové ("Lída Baarová's Bittersweet Memories", 1995)

== See also ==
- Otakar Vávra
- Adina Mandlová
