= Jarní vody =

Spring Waters
- Directed by: Václav Krška
- Written by: Ivan Turgenev (book)
- Starring: Vít Olmer; Josef Kemr
- Cinematography: Josef Illík
- Music by: Jarmil Burghauser
- Release date: August 30, 1968
- Running time: 91 minutes
- Country: Czechoslovakia
- Language: Czech

Spring Waters (Czech: Jarní vody) is a 1968 Czechoslovak film directed by Václav Krška. The film starred Josef Kemr.
