= Kouty (Třebíč District) =

- Municipality
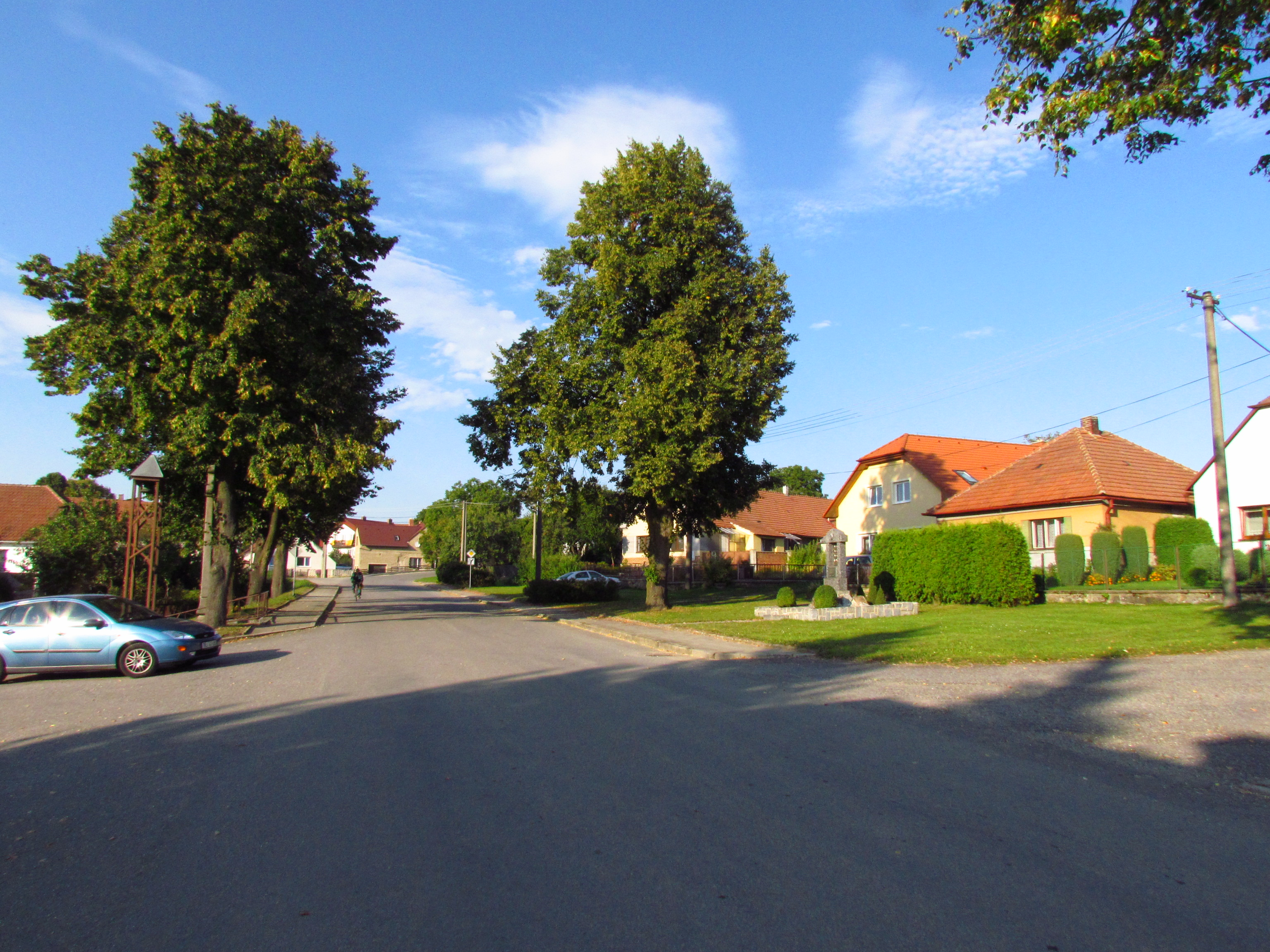
- Centre of Kouty

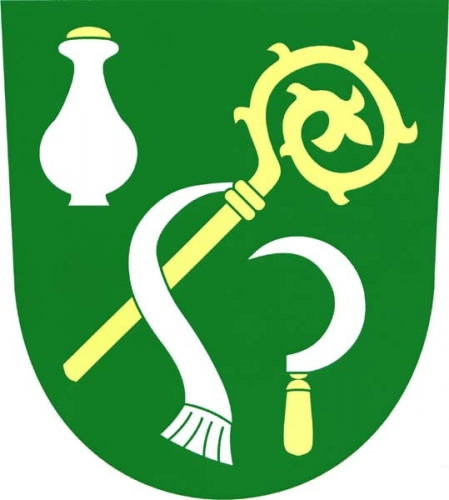
- Flag Coat of arms

- Location in the Czech Republic
- Coordinates: 49°18′53″N 15°47′34″E
- Country: Czech Republic
- Region: Vysočina
- District: Třebíč
- First mentioned: 1416

Area
  - Total: 8.33 km^{2} (3.22 sq mi)
- Elevation: 550 m (1,800 ft)

Population (2026-01-01)
  - Total: 417
  - Density: 50.1/km^{2} (130/sq mi)
- Time zone: UTC+1 (CET)
  - Summer (DST): UTC+2 (CEST)
- Postal code: 675 08
- Website: www.obeckouty.cz

Kouty is a municipality and village in Třebíč District in the Vysočina Region of the Czech Republic. It has about 400 inhabitants.

Kouty lies approximately 12 kilometres (7 mi) north-west of Třebíč, 18 km (11 mi) south-east of Jihlava, and 132 km (82 mi) south-east of Prague.

== Demographics ==
Historical population
Year	Pop.	±%
1869	416	—
1880	496	+19.2%
1890	507	+2.2%
1900	488	−3.7%
1910	505	+3.5%
1921	511	+1.2%
1930	461	−9.8%
1950	401	−13.0%
1961	426	+6.2%
1970	374	−12.2%
1980	402	+7.5%
1991	391	−2.7%
2001	396	+1.3%
2011	360	−9.1%
2021	367	+1.9%
Source: Censuses
