= Josef Stříbrný =

Czech ice hockey player

- Born: July 13, 1996 (age 29) Most, Czech Republic
- Height: 5 ft 11 in (180 cm)
- Weight: 194 lb (88 kg; 13 st 12 lb)
- Position: Left winger
- Shoots: Left
- ELH team (P) Cur. team: HC Litvínov; HC Mostečtí Lvi (Czech 2. liga)
- Playing career: 2016–present

Josef Stříbrný (born July 13, 1996) is a Czech professional ice hockey left winger. He is currently playing for HC Mostečtí Lvi of the Czech 2. liga on loan from HC Litvínov.

Stříbrný made his Czech Extraliga debut for HC Litvínov during the 2015–16 season and to date he has played 26 games for the team. He has also had loan spells with HC Most, HC Stadion Litoměřice and HC Baník Sokolov.
