= Fráňa Šrámek =

Czechoslovak anarchist and writer (1877–1952)

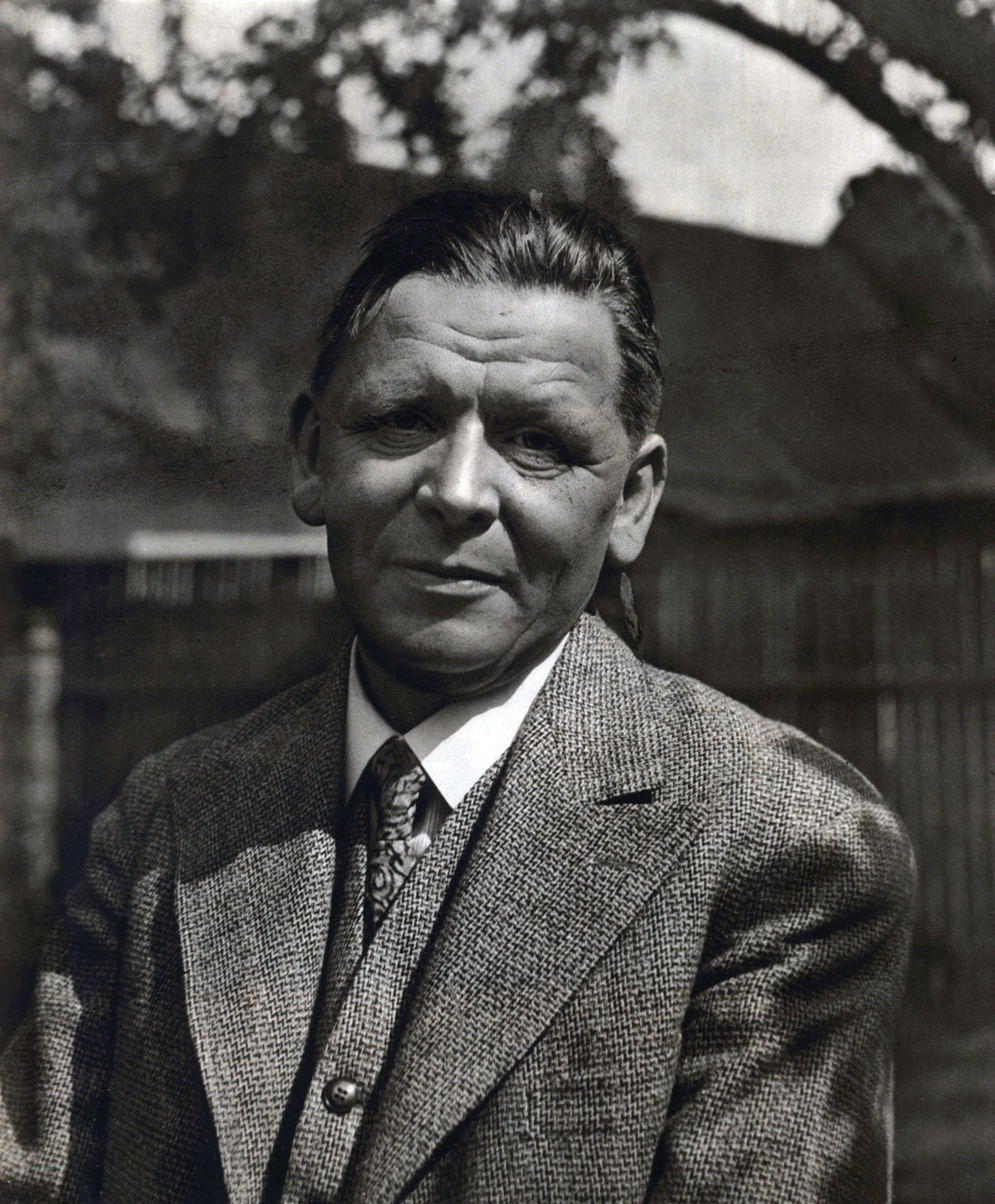
- Šrámek in 1932
- Born: František Šrámek; 19 January 1877 Sobotka, Austria-Hungary
- Died: 1 July 1952 (aged 75) Prague, Czechoslovakia
- Occupation: Poet; playwright; writer
- Language: Czech
- Literary movement: Impressionism; Vitalism
- Notable works: Stříbrný vítr
- Spouse: Miloslava Hrdličková-Šrámková

František Šrámek (19 January 1877 – 1 July 1952), known as Fráňa Šrámek, was a Czech and Czechoslovak anarchist, poet, playwright and writer.

== Biography ==
In 1885 his family relocated to Písek, where he lived for a long time and much of his work was created in and about this town. After study he joined the military for a period of about a year, but was forced to continue service for another due to bad behavior. In 1914 he fell ill with rheumatism.

== Novels ==
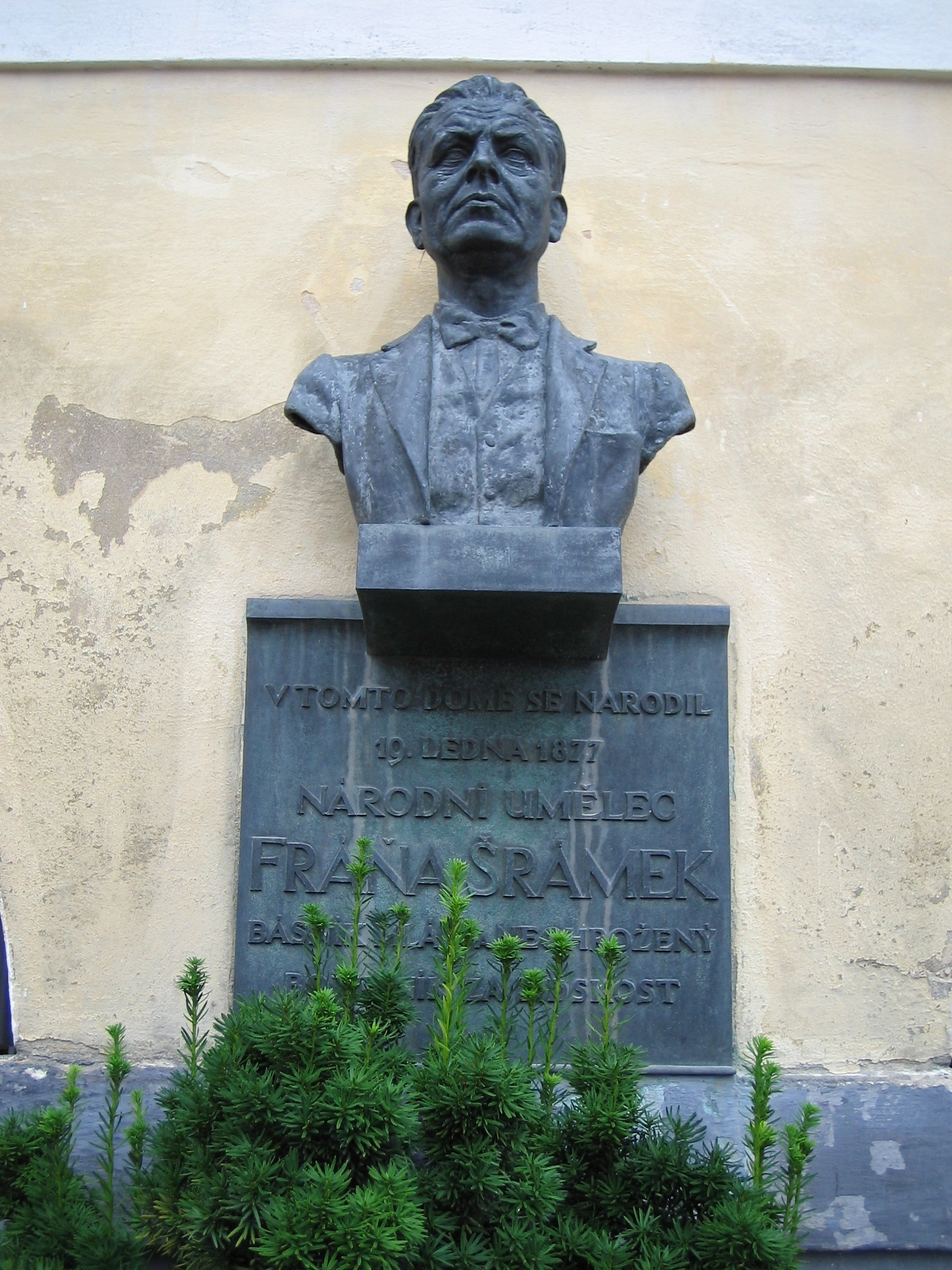
Memorial plaque to Fráňa Šrámek in Sobotka

- Stříbrný vítr
- Tělo
- Past
- Křižovatky

== Poems collections ==
- Modrý a rudý (1906)
- Splav
- Ještě zní
- Života bído, přec tě mám rád (1905)
- Nové básně
- Rány, růže

== See also ==
- List of Czech writers
