= Sukorady (Jičín District) =

- Municipality
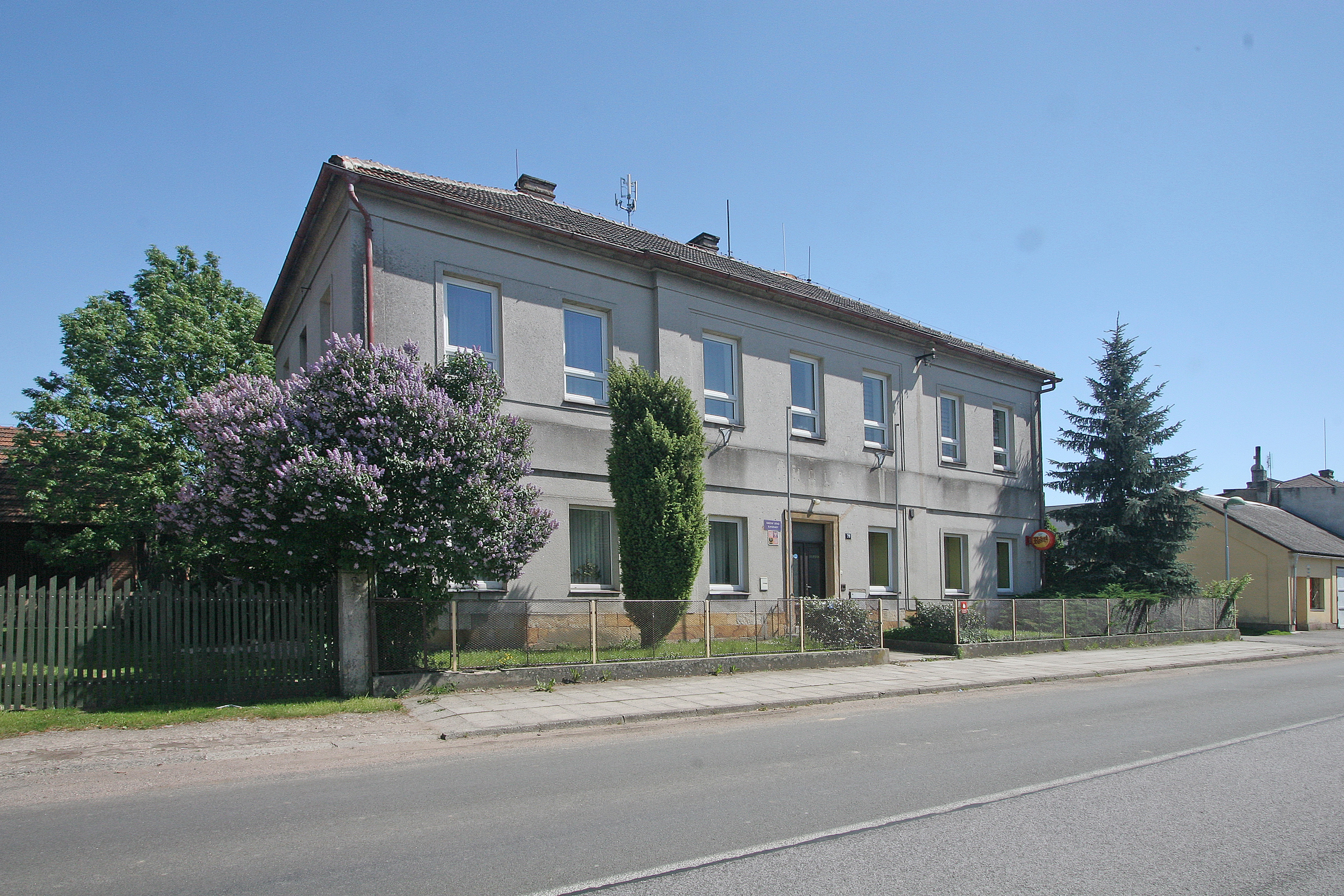
- Municipal office

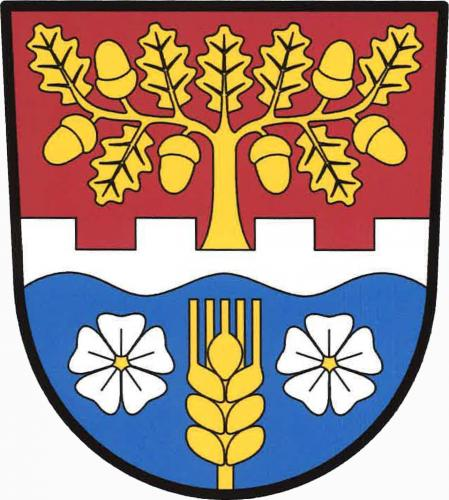
- Flag Coat of arms

- Location in the Czech Republic
- Coordinates: 50°19′32″N 15°34′58″E
- Country: Czech Republic
- Region: Hradec Králové
- District: Jičín
- First mentioned: 1382

Area
  - Total: 5.51 km^{2} (2.13 sq mi)
- Elevation: 262 m (860 ft)

Population (2026-01-01)
  - Total: 226
  - Density: 41.0/km^{2} (106/sq mi)
- Time zone: UTC+1 (CET)
  - Summer (DST): UTC+2 (CEST)
- Postal code: 508 01
- Website: www.sukorady.org

Sukorady is a municipality and village in Jičín District in the Hradec Králové Region of the Czech Republic. It has about 200 inhabitants.

== Administrative division ==
Sukorady consists of two municipal parts (in brackets population according to the 2021 census):

- Sukorady (235)
- Kouty (8)

== Demographics ==
Historical population
Year	Pop.	±%
1869	341	—
1880	427	+25.2%
1890	455	+6.6%
1900	433	−4.8%
1910	415	−4.2%
1921	390	−6.0%
1930	373	−4.4%
1950	323	−13.4%
1961	306	−5.3%
1970	278	−9.2%
1980	271	−2.5%
1991	210	−22.5%
2001	205	−2.4%
2011	205	+0.0%
2021	243	+18.5%
Source: Censuses

== Notable people ==
- Věra Ferbasová (1913–1976), actress
