= Václav Krška =

Czech film director

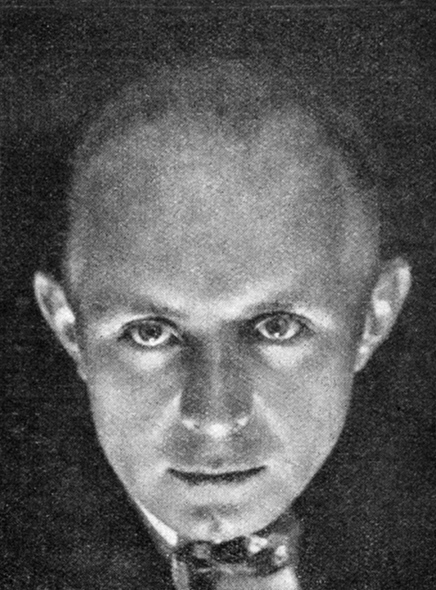
- Born: 7 October 1900; Písek, Bohemia, Austria-Hungary (now Czech Republic)
- Died: 17 November 1969 (aged 69); Prague, Czechoslovakia
- Occupations: Film director Screenwriter; Writer
- Years active: 1939-1969

Václav Krška (7 October 1900 – 17 November 1969) was a Czech film director, screenwriter and writer.

== Life ==
Krška was born in Písek on 7 October 1900 as the only child. His father was a butcher and innkeeper, but died soon after his birth. His mother married a mill owner, so Krška grew up in a mill in Heřmaň. After his step-father and mother died, he was managing the mill until 1937. In his youth he founded an amateur theatre for which he wrote, acted and directed. He also wrote poems, short stories and novels. Krška made his first movie Fiery Summer in 1939, based on the novel he wrote. He was a homosexual, as were his frequent collaborators František Čáp and Eduard Cupák. During the Nazi occupation he was sentenced to 5 months in prison for homosexual relations.

== Selected filmography ==
- Fiery Summer (1939)
- The Boys on the River (1944)
- Magical River (1945)
- When You Return (1947)
- Bohemian Rapture (1947)
- The 1848 Revolutionary Year (1949)
- The Herald of Dawn (1950)
- Mikoláš Aleš (1951)
- Youthful Years (1952)
- Moon over the River (1953)
- Silvery Wind (1954)
- From My Life (1955)
- Dalibor (1956)
- Labakan (1956)
- A Legend about Love (1956)
- The Road Back (1958)
- Scars of the Past (1958)
- Young Shoots (1960)
- The Day the Tree Blooms (1961)
- The Comedy with Mr Klika (1964)
- A Place in the Group (segment Optimist) (1964)
- The Last Rose from Casanova (1966)
- The Girl with Three Camels (1967)
- Spring Waters (1968)
