= List of Czech films of the 1930s =

A List of Czech films of the 1930s.

Title	Director	Cast	Genre	Notes
1930
Aimless Walk	Alexandr Hackenschmied		Documentary	Short
All for Love	Martin Frič	Suzanne Marwille, Frantisek Klika, Jan W. Speerger	Comedy	
C. a K. polní maršálek (Imperial and Royal Field Marshal)	Karel Lamač	Vlasta Burian, Theodor Pištěk and Czech actors	comedy	This is the first Czech soundfilm
K. und K. Feldmarschall	Karel Lamač	Vlasta Burian, Karl Forest and German actors	comedy	German version of film above made in the same time by the same director
Monsieur le maréchal	Karel Lamač	French actors	comedy	French version of film above made in the same time by the same director
Černé oči, proč pláčete...?	Leo Marten			
Chudá holka	Martin Frič	Suzanne Marwille		
Když struny lkají	Friedrich Feher		Drama	
Ihr Junge	Friedrich Feher		Drama	German version of film above made in the same time by the same director
A Girl from the Reeperbahn (Ein Mädel von der Reeperbahn)	Karl Anton	Trude Berliner, Olga Chekhova, Hans Adalbert Schlettow		German-language film
Naše jedenáctka	Václav Binovec			
Svatý Václav	Jan S. Kolár			
Tonka of the Gallows	Karl Anton	Ita Rina		
Utrpení šedé sestry	Leo Marten			
Vendelínův očistec a ráj	Přemysl Pražský			
Za rodnou hroudou	Oldrich Kmínek			
1931
Aféra plukovníka Redla	Karl Anton	Emil Artur Longen, Marie Grossová and Czech actors		
Der Fall des Generalstabs-Oberst Redl	Karl Anton	Theodor Loos, Lil Dagover and German actors		German version of film above made in the same time by the same director
Dobrý voják Švejk (The Good Soldier Schweik)	Martin Frič	Saša Rašilov		
Fidlovačka	Svatopluk Innemann			
Karel Havlíček Borovský	Svatopluk Innemann			
Kariéra Pavla Camrdy	Miroslav J. Krnanský	Lída Baarová		
Miláček pluku	Emil Artur Longen			
Muži v offsidu	Svatopluk Innemann	Hugo Haas, Eman Fiala, Jindřich Plachta, Theodor Pištěk	comedy	according to a novel by Karel Poláček production: ABfilm
Na Pražském hradě	Alexandr Hackenschmied			
Načeradec, král kibiců	Gustav Machatý	Hugo Haas, Eman Fiala		
On a jeho sestra (Him and His Sister)	Karel Lamač, Martin Frič	Vlasta Burian, Anny Ondra and Czech actors	comedy	production: Elektafilm
Er und seine Schwester	Karel Lamač	Vlasta Burian, Anny Ondra and German actors	comedy	production: Elektafilm German version of film above made simultaneously in the same time by the same director
Osada mladých snů	Oldrich Kmínek			
Poslední bohém	Svatopluk Innemann			
Psohlavci	Svatopluk Innemann			
Svět bez hranic	Julius Lébl			
Světlo proniká tmou	Otakar Vávra, Frantisek Pilát			Short
To neznáte Hadimršku (Business Under Distress)	Karel Lamač, Martin Frič	Vlasta Burian, Meda Valentová, and Czech actors (Jindřich Plachta)	comedy	production: Elektafilm
Wehe, wenn er losgelassen	Karel Lamač	Vlasta Burian, Mabel Hariot and German actors	comedy	production: Elektafilm German version of film above made in the same time by the same director
Ze soboty na neděli (From Saturday to Sunday)	Gustav Machatý			
1932
Anton Špelec, ostrostřelec (Anton Spelec, Sharp-Shooter)	Martin Frič	Vlasta Burian, Jaroslav Marvan, Jindřich Plachta, Theodor Pištěk	comedy	production: Meissnerfilm
Devčátko, neříkej ne!	Josef Medeotti-Bohác			
Funebrák (The Undertaker)	Karel Lamač	Vlasta Burian, Čeněk Šlégl	comedy	production: Elektafilm
Haunted People (Gehetzte Menschen)	Friedrich Feher			German-language film
Kantor ideál (The Ideal Schoolmaster)	Martin Frič	Anny Ondra		
Professeur Cupidon	Robert Beaudoin, André Chemel			French version of film above made in the same time
Lelíček ve službách Sherlocka Holmese	Martin Frič	Vlasta Burian, Martin Frič, Lída Baarová	parody	
Le roi bis	Robert Beaudoin			French version of film above made in the same time
Madla z cihelny	Vladimír Slavínský	Lída Baarová, Hugo Haas		
Obrácení Ferdyše Pištory	Josef Kodíček	Hugo Haas		
Peníze nebo život	Jindřich Honzl			
Před maturitou	Svatopluk Innemann			
Právo na hřích	Vladimír Slavínský			
Pudr a benzín	Jindřich Honzl	Jiří Voskovec, Jan Werich		
Písnickář	Svatopluk Innemann, Rudolf Myzet			
Růžové kombiné	Leo Marten	Lída Baarová		
Šenkýrka u divoké krásy	Svatopluk Innemann	Lída Baarová		
Sestra Angelika (Sister Angelika)	Martin Frič	Suzanne Marwille		
Tisíc za jednu noc	Jaroslav Svára			
Tausend für eine Nacht	Max Mack			German version of film above made in the same time
Pobočník Jeho Výsosti	Martin Frič	14. movie of Vlasta Burian, Nora Stallich, and Czech actors	comedy	
His Majesty's Adjutant (Der Adjutant seiner Hoheit)	Martin Frič	Vlasta Burian, Werner Fuetterer and German actors	comedy	German version of film above made in the same time by the same director
Zapadlí vlastenci	Miroslav J. Krnanský	Lída Baarová		
Zlaté ptáče	Oldrich Kmínek			
1933
Diagnosa X	Leo Marten			
Dobrý tramp Bernásek	Karel Lamač			
Dum na predmesti (The House in the Suburbs)	Miroslav Cikán	Hugo Haas, Jindřich Plachta		
Dvanáct křesel (Twelve Chairs)	Martin Frič, Michal Waszyński	Vlasta Burian, Adolf Dymsza and polish actors	comedy	This film is a coproduction CZE/POL
Extase (Ecstasy)	Gustav Machatý	Hedy Lamarr		
The Happiness of Grinzing	Otto Kanturek	Iván Petrovich, Gretl Theimer, Alfred Gerasch	Drama	German-language
In the Little House Below Emauzy	Otto Kanturek	Adina Mandlová, Antonín Novotný, Ferdinand Hart	Drama	
The Inspector General	Martin Frič	Vlasta Burian, Jaroslav Marvan, Václav Trégl	comedy	
Její lékař	Vladimír Slavínský	Lída Baarová, Hugo Haas		
Jindra, hraběnka Ostrovínová	Karel Lamač			
Jsem děvče s čertem v těle	Karl Anton	Lída Baarová		
The Mystery of the Blue Room	Miroslav Cikán	Karel Hašler, Jaroslav Marvan	Mystery	
Na sluneční straně	Vladislav Vančura			
Okénko	Vladimír Slavínský, Hugo Haas	Hugo Haas, Lída Baarová		
Perníková chaloupka	Oldrich Kmínek			
Řeka	Josef Rovenský			
S vyloučením veřejnosti (Public Not Admitted)	Martin Frič	Karel Lamač		
Sedmá velmoc	Přemysl Pražský	Lída Baarová		
Skřivánčí píseň	Svatopluk Innemann	Jarmila Novotná		
Srdce za písničku	Karel Hašler	Karel Hašler		
Strýček z Ameriky	V. Ch. Vladimírov	Vlasta Burian	comedy	
Svítání	Václav Kubásek			
U snědeného krámu (The Ruined Shopkeeper)	Martin Frič	Vlasta Burian, František Smolík, Antonie Nedošinská	tragedy	according to a drama by Ignác Herrmann
U svatého Antoníčka	Svatopluk Innemann			
Vražda v Ostrovní ulici (Murder in the Ostrovní Street)	Svatopluk Innemann			
Život je pes (Life Is a Dog)	Martin Frič	Hugo Haas, Světla Svozilová, Adina Mandlová, Theodor Pištěk	comedy	
The Double Fiance (Der Doppelbräutigam)	Martin Frič			German version of film above made in the same time by the same director
1934
Anita v ráji	Jan Sviták			
Exekutor v kabaretu	Robert Zdráhal			
Hej rup! (Workers, Let's Go)	Martin Frič	Jiří Voskovec, Jan Werich		production: Meissnerfilm
Hrdinný kapitán Korkorán (The Heroic Captain Korkorán)	Miroslav Cikán	19. movie of Vlasta Burian, Jaroslav Marvan, Jiřina Štěpničková, Čeněk Šlégl	comedy	production: Elektafilm
Hřích mládí	A. Podhorský			
The Last Man	Martin Frič	Hugo Haas, Zdeňka Baldová, Marie Glázrová	Comedy	
Marijka nevěrnice	Vladislav Vancura			
Matka Kráčmerka	Vladimír Slavínský			
Mazlíček (The Little Pet)	Martin Frič	Hugo Haas		
Na Svatém Kopečku	Miroslav Cikán			
Nezlobte dědečka	Karel Lamač	Vlasta Burian, Čeněk Šlégl, Adina Mandlová, Theodor Pištěk, Hana Vítová	comedy	production: Meissnerfilm
Pán na roztrhání (Man in Demand on All Sides)	Miroslav Cikán	Lída Baarová		
Pokušení paní Antonie	Vladimír Slavínský	Lída Baarová		
Polish Blood (Polenblut)	Karel Lamač	Anny Ondra		German-language film
Polská krev	Karel Lamač			
Posel míru	Martin Frič			Short
Pozdní máj	Leo Marten			
Rozpustilá noc	Vladimír Majer			
U nás v Kocourkově	Miroslav Cikán	Jan Werich	comedy	
Volga in Flames	Victor Tourjansky	Albert Prejean, Valéry Inkijinoff, Danielle Darrieux	Historical	Co-production with France
Za ranních červánků	Josef Rovenský	Karel Hašler		
Za řádovými dveřmi	Leo Marten			
Žena, která ví co chce (A Woman Who Knows What She Wants)	Václav Binovec			
Žijeme v Praze	Otakar Vávra			Short
Zlatá Kateřina	Vladimír Slavínský	Lída Baarová		
1935
A život jde dál	Václav Kubásek, Carl Junghans, F. W. Kraemer	Ita Rina		
Ať žije nebožtík (Long Live with Dearly Departed)	Martin Frič	Hugo Haas, Adina Mandlová, Karel Hašler, Václav Trégl	comedy	
Barbora řádí (Raging Barbora)	Miroslav Cikán			
Bezdětná	Miroslav J. Krnanský			
Cácorka	Jan Svoboda			
The Eleventh Commandment	Martin Frič	Hugo Haas, Jiřina Štěpničková, Truda Grosslichtová	Comedy	production: Elektafilm
Grand Hotel Nevada	Jan Sviták	Lída Baarová, Otomar Korbelář	Comedy	
Her Highness Dances the Waltz	Max Neufeld			German-language film
Hrdina jedné noci	Martin Frič	Vlasta Burian, Truda Grosslichtová, Václav Trégl and Czech actors	comedy	production: Meissnerfilm
Hero for a Night	Martin Frič	Vlasta Burian, Betty Bird, Theo Lingen	comedy	production: Meissnerfilm German version of film above made in the same time by the same director
Jánošík	Martin Frič	Paľo Bielik		
Jedna z miliónu	Vladimír Slavínský			
Koho jsem včera líbal?	Jan Svoboda			
Král ulice	Miroslav Cikán	Karel Hašler		
Listopad	Otakar Vávra			Short
Maryša	Josef Rovenský	Jiřina Štěpničková		
Milan Rastislav Stefanik	Jan Sviták	Zvonimir Rogoz	biopic	produced by: Nationalfilm
Na růžích ustláno	Miroslav Cikán	Lída Baarová		
Osudná chvíle	Václav Kubásek			
The Poacher from Egerland (Der Wilderer vom Egerland)	Walter Kolm-Veltée, Vladimír Majer			
Polibek ve sněhu	Václav Binovec			
Liebe auf Bretteln	Rudolph Cartier			German version of film above made in the same time
Pozdní láska	Václav Kubásek			
První políbení	Vladimír Slavínský			
Studentská máma	Vladimír Slavínský			
Svatá lež	Václav Binovec			
Tři muži na silnici (slečnu nepočítaje)	F. Šestka	Vlasta Burian		Short
Vdavky Nanynky Kulichovy	Vladimír Slavínský			
Výkřik do sibiřské noci	V. Ch. Vladimírov			
1936
Černobílá rapsodie	Martin Frič			Short
Děti velké lásky	Václav Kubásek			
Divoch	Jan Sviták	Truda Grosslichtová, Rolf Wanka		
Le Golem	Julien Duvivier	Harry Baur		French-language film
Hra bublinek	Hermína Týrlová, Karel Dodal, Irena Dodalová			Short
Irca's Romance	Karel Hašler	Jiřina Steimarová, Rolf Wanka, Theodor Pištěk	Drama	
Jizdní hlídka	Václav Binovec			
Komediantská princezna	Miroslav Cikán	Lída Baarová		
Lojzička	Miroslav Cikán			
Manželství na úvěr	Oldrich Kmínek			
Le mari rêvé	Roger Capellani	Pierre Brasseur, Arletty		French remake of Život je pes (1933)
Na tý louce zelený	Karel Lamač			
Páter Vojtěch	Martin Frič	Rolf Wanka		
Rozkošný příběh	Vladimír Slavínský			
Sextánka	Svatopluk Innemann	Rolf Wanka		
Arme kleine Inge	Robert Land	Rolf Wanka		German version of film above made in the same time
Srdce v soumraku	Vladimír Slavínský	Rolf Wanka		
Švadlenka (The Seamstress)	Martin Frič	Lída Baarová, Theodor Pištěk, Hugo Haas		
Světlo jeho očí	Václav Kubásek			
Trhani	Václav Wasserman			
Three Men in the Snow	Vladimír Slavínský	Hugo Haas, Věra Ferbasová	Comedy	
Tvoje srdce inkognito	Svatopluk Innemann			
Ulice zpívá	Vlasta Burian, Ladislav Brom, Cenek Slégl	Vlasta Burian		
Ulička v ráji (Paradise Road)	Martin Frič	Hugo Haas		
Das Gäßchen zum Paradies	Martin Frič	Hans Moser		German version of film above made in the same time by the same director
Uličnice	Vladimír Slavínský			
Velbloud uchem jehly (Camel Through the Eye of a Needle)	Hugo Haas, Otakar Vávra	Antonie Nedošinská, Jiřina Štěpničková, Pavel Herbert, Adina Mandlová, Oldřich Nový	comedy	
Vojnarka	Vladimír Borský			
1937
Andula vyhrála (Andula Won)	Miroslav Cikán	Hugo Haas, Věra Ferbasová, Růžena Šlemrová, Václav Trégl	comedy	
Battalion	Miroslav Cikán			
Bílá nemoc (Skeleton on Horseback)	Hugo Haas	Hugo Haas, Zdeněk Štěpánek, František Smolík	drama	according to a drama by Karel Čapek
Děvče za výkladem	Miroslav Cikán			
Falešná kočička	Vladimír Slavínský	Věra Ferbasová, Oldřich Nový, Antonie Nedošinská, Jára Kohout	comedy	remake of the 1926 silent film Falešná kočička
Jarčin profesor	Jiří Slavíček, Čeněk Šlégl	Gustav Nezval, Hana Vítová, Jindřich Plachta, Ladislav Pešek, Zdeňka Baldová, Theodor Pištěk	comedy	
Mravnost nade vše (Morality Above All Else)	Martin Frič	Hugo Haas, Světla Svozilová, Adina Mandlová, Hašler Ferbasová	comedy	
Poslíček lásky	Miroslav Cikán	Rolf Wanka		
Not a Word About Love	Miroslav Cikán	Rolf Wanka		German version of film above made in the same time by the same director
Tři vejce do skla	Martin Frič	Vlasta Burian - leading role and two other lines	comedy	production: UFA
Vzdušné torpédo 48	Miroslav Cikán			
1938
Cech panen kutnohorských (The Merry Wives)	Otakar Vávra	Zdeněk Štěpánek, Hana Vítová, Theodor Pištěk, Antonie Nedošinská, Ladislav Pešek, František Smolík	drama	
Ducháček to zařídí (Ducháček Will Fix It)	Karel Lamač	Vlasta Burian, Ladislav Hemmer, Adina Mandlová, Čeněk Šlégl	comedy	production: Metropolitanfilm
A Foolish Girl	Václav Binovec	Hana Vítová, Vladimír Borský, Zita Kabátová	Romance	
Její pastorkyně	Miroslav Cikán			
Klapzubova jedenáctka	Ladislav Brom	Theodor Pištěk, Raoul Schránil, Hana Vítová, Antonie Nedošinská, František Filipovský	comedy	production: Bromfilm
Lucerna (The Lantern)	Karel Lamac	Jarmila Kšírová, Theodor Pištěk	Fantasy	
Milování zakázáno (Forbidden Love)	Miroslav Cikán			
Škola základ života	Martin Frič	František Smolík, Jaroslav Marvan, Ladislav Pešek, R.A.Strejka, František Filipovský	comedy	production: UFA
Svět kde se žebrá	Miroslav Cikán	Hugo Haas		
Vandiny trampoty	Miroslav Cikán			
1939
Cesta do hlubin študákovy duše (Journey into the Depth of the Student's Soul)	Martin Frič	Jindřich Plachta, Jaroslav Marvan, Miloš Nedbal, Ladislav Pešek, R.A.Strejka, Rudolf Hrušínský	comedy	production: Elektafilm
Dobře situovaný pán	Miroslav Cikán			
Eva tropí hlouposti (Eva Fools Around)	Martin Frič	Nataša Gollová, Oldřich Nový, Jiřina Sedláčková, Raoul Schránil, Zdeňka Baldová	crazy comedy	
Kdybych byl tátou	Miroslav Cikán			
Kouzelný dům (The Magic House)	Otakar Vávra	Zdeněk Štěpánek, Adina Mandlová	drama	
Kristián (Christian)	Martin Frič	Adina Mandlová, Oldřich Nový, Nataša Golová, Raoul Schránil	romantic comedy	production: Lucernafilm
Osmnáctiletá (Eighteen Years Old)	Miroslav Cikán			
Příklady táhnou	Miroslav Cikán			
Studujeme za školou	Miroslav Cikán			
U pokladny stál...	Karel Lamač	Vlasta Burian, Čeněk Šlégl, Jaroslav Marvan, Adina Mandlová	comedy	production: Bromfilm
Ulice zpívá	Vlasta Burian, Čeněk Šlégl, Ladislav Brom	Vlasta Burian, Jaroslav Marvan, Jiřina Šejbalová, Marie Glázrová, Čeněk Šlégl	comedy	production: Bromfilm
V pokušení	Miroslav Cikán			
