= Elektafilm =

Czechoslovak film company

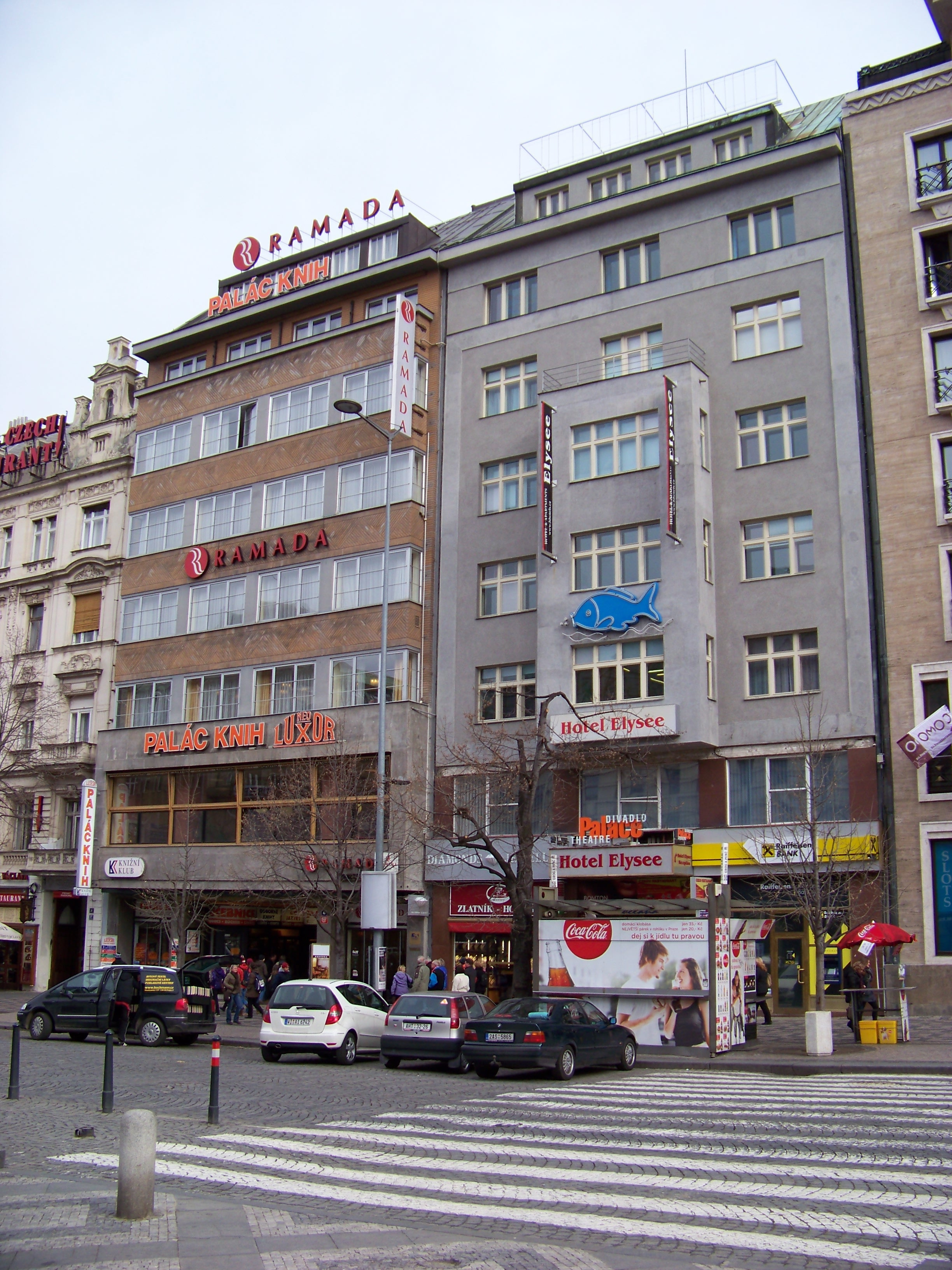
- Former headquarters of Elektafilm at Václavské náměstí 819/43, Prague
- Type: Joint-stock company
- Industry: Motion picture
- Founded: 1923; 103 years ago
- Defunct: 1951
- Headquarters: Prague, Czechoslovakia
- Area served: Czechoslovakia, Germany, Austria, France
- Key people: Josef Auerbach
- Products: Film
- Subsidiaries: Slaviafilm

Elektafilm a.s., formerly Elektafilm s.r.o. was a Czechoslovak film production and film distribution company that existed from 1923 to 1951. It produced and distributed silent and since 1930 sound films in Czech, German and French languages.

In the 1930s, Elektafilm was the biggest film production company in Czechoslovakia. The most successful Elektafilm-produced film was Gustav Machatý's Ecstasy. Most of its films were shot at rented A-B Ateliers in Vinohrady, Prague in 1920s, and Barrandov Studios since 1930. Another Czechoslovak production company, Elekta-Journal (1929-1937), had no connection to Elektafilm despite the similar name. Elektafilm frequently worked with directors Martin Frič, Svatopluk Innemann, Karel Lamač and Miroslav J. Krňanský.

== History ==
Elektafilm was founded by Josef Auerbach, Julius Schmitt and Jan Reiter as a limited liability company in 1923. In 1926, Elektafilm acquired a production company Vircofilm. In 1928, the company transformed to joint-stock company. In 1930, Elektafilm bought two other Czechoslovak film production companies Slaviafilm (then owned by Sascha-Film) and Moldaviafilm. In 1932, Auerbach acquired 100% of shares of Elektafilm. He sold Moldaviafilm in 1934. In 1939, Auerbach moved to New York through Brazil because of the worsening political situation for the Jews in Europe. During the war years, the company was taken over by the Germans and produced films for UFA GmbH. In 1945, the company was nationalized and finally dissolved in 1951. Josef Auerbach's effort to get the company back were not successful. In USA, he went into real estate and popcorn business, then he worked with The Mirisch Company. In 1964 he accepted the Academy Award for Lauro Venturi's short documentary film Chagall.

== International operations ==
In the 1930s Elektafilm was co-producing their multi-language movies with French Gaumont, German Sonorfilm and Ondra-Lamač-Film or Austrian DonauFilm.

== Films produced ==
=== Elektafilm ===
| Year | Title |
|---|---|
| 1923 | The Kidnapping of Fux the Banker |
| 1925 | From the Czech Mills |
| 1927 | Schweik in Civilian Life |
| 1929 | Hanka a Jindra |
| 1930 | Imperial and Royal Field Marshal; K. und K. Feldmarschall |
| 1931 | The Affair of Colonel Redl; Der Fall des Generalstabs-Oberst Redl |
| 1931 | Him and His Sister; Er und seine Schwester |
| 1931 | Last Bohemian |
| 1931 | Kariéra Pavla Čamrdy |
| 1931 | Business Under Distress; Wehe, wenn er losgelassen |
| 1932 | Extase (Czech); Extase (French) |
| 1932 | Lelíček ve službách Sherlocka Holmese; Le roi bis |
| 1932 | Zapadlí vlastenci |
| 1933 | Professeur Cupidon |
| 1933 | Public Not Admitted |
| 1933 | Řeka |
| 1933 | Skřivánčí píseň |
| 1934 | The Heroic Captain Korkorán |
| 1934 | Polská krev Polish Blood |
| 1934 | At St. Anthony's |
| 1935 | Childless |
| 1935 | Jedenácté přikázání |
| 1935 | Král ulice |
| 1935 | Student's Mother |
| 1935 | Valse éternelle |
| 1935 | Nanynka Kulichová's Wedding |
| 1935 | Le Mari rêve |
| 1936 | On the Green Meadow |
| 1936 | Heart at Dusk |
| 1936 | Her Highness Dances the Waltz |
| 1937 | The False Pussycat |
| 1937 | Watchman No. 47 |
| 1937 | Widow from the Sky |
| 1937 | Woman at the Crossroads |
| 1938 | White Crow |
| 1938 | A Foolish Girl |
| 1938 | The Third Ringing |
| 1939 | Cesta do hlubin študákovy duše |
| 1939 | The Magic House |
| 1939 | Věra Lukášová |
| 1940 | Second Tour |
| 1940 | Jana Kosinová's Past |
| 1940 | Pohádka máje |
| 1940 | To byl český muzikant |
| 1941 | The Blue Veil |

=== Slaviafilm ===
| Year | Title |
|---|---|
| 1929 | Erotikon |
| 1932 | Sestra Angelika |
| 1932 | Budoucí hospodyňka |
| 1933 | Srdce za písničku |
| 1936 | Rozkošný příběh |
| 1936 | Uličnice |
| 1938 | Holka nebo kluk? |
| 1938 | Svatební cesta |
| 1939 | Dědečkem proti své vůli |
| 1939 | Zlatý člověk |
| 1940 | Baron Prášil |
| 1940 | Dva týdny štěstí |
| 1940 | Pacientka dr. Hegla |
| 1940 | Poznej svého muže |
| 1941 | Advokát chudých |
| 1941 | Provdám svou ženu |
| 1941 | Turbina |
| 1941 | From the Czech Mills |

== Bibliography ==
- Auerbach, Norbert: Z Barrandova do Hollywoodu, 2006, Prague: Mladá fronta ISBN 80-204-1558-0
- Jiras, Pavel: Barrandov I: Vzestup k výšinám, 2011, Ottovo nakladatelství ISBN 978-80-7451-173-8
- Jiras, Pavel: Barrandov II: Zlatý věk (1933-1939), 2012, Ottovo nakladatelství ISBN 978-80-7451-261-2
- Bednařík, Petr: Arizace české kinematografie, 2003, Karolinum ISBN 80-246-0619-4
