= The Last Bohemian (1931 film) =

1931 film

- Theatrical release poster
- Poslední bohém
- Directed by: Svatopluk Innemann
- Screenplay by: Emil Artur Longen; Josef Neuberg
- Starring: Saša Rašilov; František Havel
- Cinematography: Jan Stallich
- Edited by: Svatopluk Innemann
- Music by: Jára Beneš
- Production companies: Elektafilm; Sonorfilm
- Distributed by: Slaviafilm
- Release date: 21 August 1931 (Prague)
- Running time: 104 minutes
- Country: Czechoslovakia
- Language: Czech

The Last Bohemian (Czech: Poslední bohém) is a 1931 Czech biographical film about Jaroslav Hašek directed by Svatopluk Innemann.

== Cast ==
- Saša Rašilov as Jaroslav Hašek
- Radola Renský as Ríša Hašek
- František Havel as Ríša's grandfather
- František Sauer as Secret policeman Firnádl
- Jan Richter as Dog salesman Alois Kvíčala
- Theodor Pištěk as Landowner Ludvík Pazdera
- Zdenka Hatláková as Pazdera's wife
- Vladimír Beztahovský as Otakar Pazdera
- Truda Grosslichtová as Otakar's governess
- Anna Švarcová as Pazdera's mother in law

== Reception ==
Premiere was held in Fenix and Metro cinemas in Prague. The film received mixed reviews.
