= Gypsies (1922 film) =

1922 film directed by Karl Anton

- Czech: Cikáni
- Directed by: Karl Anton
- Written by: Karel Hynek Mácha (novel); Karl Anton
- Based on: Cikáni; 1835 novel by Karel Hynek Mácha
- Starring: Hugo Svoboda; Olga Augustová; Theodor Pistek
- Cinematography: Karol Kopriva
- Production company: AB Film
- Distributed by: La Tricolore
- Release date: 7 April 1922
- Running time: 91 minutes
- Country: Czechoslovakia
- Languages: Silent; Czech intertitles

Gypsies (Czech: Cikáni) is a 1922 Czech silent drama film directed by Karl Anton and starring Hugo Svoboda, Olga Augustová and Theodor Pistek.

It is an adaptation of the 1835 novel Cikáni by Karel Hynek Mácha. Along with Anton's later silent The May Fairy, it is credited with initiating the tradition of lyricism in Czech cinema.

== Plot summary ==
A Venetian gondolier looks for his beloved, who a Czech count had taken away and then rejected. Meanwhile the gondolier finds a boy among a group of Roma in Bohemia and the two become wandering musicians.

== Cast ==
- Hugo Svoboda as Giacomo
- Olga Augustová as Angelina
- Theodor Pistek as Count Valdemar Lomecký
- Alfons Rasp as son of Valdemar Lomecký
- Julius Czonský as innkeeper
- Bronislava Livia as Lea
- Karel Fiala as Administrator of a manor
- Karel Schleichert as Old Veteran
- Josef Sváb-Malostranský as guest
- Karel Faltys as Napoleon
- Jirina Janderová as Countess Lomecká
- Jindrich Edl as presiding judge
- Frantisek Kudlácek as priest
