= Lelíček in the Services of Sherlock Holmes =

1932 Czech film

- Directed by: Karel Lamač
- Screenplay by: Václav Wasserman
- Based on: František Lelíček ve službách Sherlocka (novel) by Hugo Vavris
- Produced by: Jan Reiter
- Starring: Vlasta Burian; Martin Frič
- Cinematography: Otto Heller; Jan Stallich
- Edited by: Martin Frič
- Music by: Josef Kumok
- Production company: Elektafilm
- Distributed by: Elektafilm
- Release date: March 25, 1932
- Running time: 92 minutes
- Country: Czechoslovakia
- Languages: Czech; English

Lelíček in the Services of Sherlock Holmes (Czech: Lelíček ve službách Sherlocka Holmese) is a 1932 Czech comedy film directed by Karel Lamač, starring Vlasta Burian.

Sherlock Holmes was portrayed by Martin Frič. The main character is František Lelíček, who accepts an offer to act as a double for the Puerto Rican King Fernando XXIII as he is deeply in debt. Vlasta Burian plays both roles.

The director Karel Lamač simultaneously shot the French version of the film Le Roi bis with Pierre Bertin in the main double role (while the detective was again played by Frič and the queen by Truda Grosslichtová). Lamač went on to film The Hound of the Baskervilles, 'in Germany in 1937.

== Plot ==
King Fernando XXIII of Puerto Rico, fearing an imminent assassination attempt, enlists the famous detective Holmes to find a body double. Holmes tracks down František Lelíček, a notorious debtor from Moravian Brodek, who bears an uncanny resemblance to the king. Desperate to escape his creditors, Lelíček agrees to the proposal. Unlike the cowardly Fernando, the young and spirited queen refuses to flee into exile, and Lelíček's bold and energetic approach quickly wins her over. He impresses her with his fearless participation in bullfights and his calm demeanor during assassination attempts, sparking a passionate affair between the two.

Meanwhile, the treacherous ministers plot to eliminate Lelíček with a bomb concealed in a gramophone, timed to explode during the playing of the new national anthem. Holmes, narrowly escaping a dungeon where the assassins had imprisoned him, saves both Lelíček and the queen just in time. When the real king dies, Lelíček, who has grown fond of his role as king and fallen for the queen, refuses to relinquish the throne. Threatening to expose the scandal on an international scale, he forces the ministers to let him remain as king.

== Cast ==
- Vlasta Burian as František Lelíček/King Fernando XXIII
- Martin Frič as Sherlock Holmes
- Fred Bulín as Servant James
- Lída Baarová as Queen/Queen's double
- Čeněk Šlégl as Royal marshall
- Eva Jansenová as Queen's companion Conchita
- Theodor Pištěk as Prime minister Count Mendoza
- Eman Fiala as Photographer/Composer
- Zvonimir Rogoz as Royal officer
