= Josef Rovenský =

Czech actor (1894–1937)

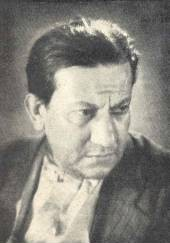
- Born: 17 April 1894; Prague, Bohemia, Austria-Hungary
- Died: 5 November 1937 (aged 43); Prague, Czechoslovakia
- Occupations: Actor, film director
- Years active: 1914–1937

Josef Rovenský (17 April 1894 – 5 November 1937) was a Czech-Jewish film actor and director. He appeared in 74 films between 1914 and 1936. He starred in the 1929 film Father Vojtech, which was the directorial debut of Martin Frič. He died during filming of Virginity. According to Otakar Vávra he died of a cocaine overdose. His last film Watchman No. 47 was then completed by Jan Sviták.

== Selected filmography ==
=== Director ===
Year	Title	Notes
1920	The Mystery of the Old Book	
1921	The Children of Fate	
1922	The Tramp's Heart	
1927	The House of Lost Happiness	
1928	Love Led Them Through Life	
1933	The River	Won Best Director at 1934 Venice Film Festival
1934	In the Red of Morning	
1934	Romance from the Tatra Mountains	Competed at 1935 Venice Film Festival
1935	Maryša	Competed at 1936 Venice Film Festival
1937	Watchman No. 47	Completed by Jan Sviták

=== Actor ===
- Little Red Riding Hood (1920)
- Tu ten kámen (1923)
- White Paradise (1924)
- Schweik in Civilian Life (1927)
- Kainovo znamení (1928)
- Father Vojtech (1929)
- Diary of a Lost Girl (1929)
- The Call of the North (1929)
- The Girl with the Whip (1929)
- Sin of a Beautiful Woman (1929)
- Když struny lkají (1930)
- A Girl from the Reeperbahn (1930)
- The Caviar Princess (1930)
- Imperial and Royal Field Marshal (1930)
- Chudá holka (1930)
- Tonka of the Gallows (1930)
- The Last Bohemian (1931)
- Business Under Distress (1931)
- The Affair of Colonel Redl (1932)
- Sister Angelika (1932)
- The Undertaker (1932)
- Wehe, wenn er losgelassen (1932)
- Public Not Admitted (1933)
- The Inspector General (1933)
- Daughter of the Regiment (1933)
