= The Kidnapping of Fux the Banker =

1923 film directed by Karl Anton

- Directed by: Karl Anton
- Screenplay by: Karel Anton; Eman Fiala
- Story by: Lev Krása; Lomikar Kleiner
- Starring: Ferdinand Kaňkovský; Anna Opplová
- Cinematography: Otto Heller; Václav Vích
- Production company: Elektafilm
- Distributed by: Elektafilm
- Release date: 31 December 1923
- Country: Czechoslovakia
- Languages: Silent; Czech intertitles

The Kidnapping of Fux the Banker (Czech: Únos bankéře Fuxe) is a 1923 Czech silent comedy film directed by Karl Anton. The film was inspired by the slapstick comedies about the Keystone Cops. Fashion designer Paul Poiret played himself. Only an incomplete 61 minutes long version of the film survived.

== Cast ==
- Adi Berger as Banker C. W. Fux
- Anny Ondra as Fux's daughter Daisy
- Karel Lamač as Tom Darey
- Bronislava Livia as Maud Gould
- Eman Fiala as Sherlock Holmes II
- Emilie Nitschová as Daisy's tutor
- Karel Fiala as Butler Karel
- Theodor Pištěk as Duke of Pommery
- Saša Rašilov as Police chief
- Paul Poiret as Fashion designer from Paris
- Jan W. Speerger as Burglar
- Přemysl Pražský as Director of the asylum
