= Kainovo znamení =

1928 film

- Directed by: Oldrich Kmínek
- Written by: Zdenek Rón (short story), Oldrich Kmínek (screenplay)
- Release date: 1928
- Country: Czechoslovakia
- Language: Silent

Kainovo znamení is a 1928 Czechoslovak romantic drama film directed by Oldrich Kmínek.

== Cast ==
- Václav Norman ... Ing. Jan Rybecký
- Josef Šváb-Malostranský ... Innkeeper
- Antonie Nedošinská ... Innkeeper's Wife
- Anita Janová ... Lidunka
- Egon Thorn ... B. Frank
- Bronislava Livia ... Irena
- Josef Rovenský ... Tucek
- Mary Jansová ... Marie
- František Marík ... Policeman
