= Theodor Pištěk =

Theodor Pištěk may refer to:

- Theodor Pištěk (actor) (1895–1960), Czech actor
- Theodor Pištěk (artist) (1932–2025), Czech costume designer, son of the above actor
