= The Case of Colonel Redl =

1931 film directed by Karl Anton

- Directed by: Karl Anton
- Written by: Alfred Schirokauer; Benno Vigny
- Based on: The Case of Colonel Redl by Egon Erwin Kisch
- Produced by: Josef Stein
- Starring: Theodor Loos; Lil Dagover; Otto Hartmann
- Cinematography: Eduard Hoesch; Václav Vích
- Music by: Willy Engel-Berger
- Production companies: Elektafilm; Sonor Film
- Distributed by: Süd-Film
- Release date: 27 February 1931
- Running time: 82 minutes
- Country: Czechoslovakia
- Language: German

The Case of Colonel Redl (German: Der Fall des Generalstabs-Oberst Redl) is a 1931 Czechoslovak spy drama film directed by Karl Anton in German language. It stars Theodor Loos, Lil Dagover and Otto Hartmann. It was a co-production between the Prague-based companies Elektafilm and Sonor Film. A separate Czech-language version The Affair of Colonel Redl was also shot at the same time. It was based on a 1924 book of the same title by Egon Erwin Kisch, detailing the story of Alfred Redl.

== Synopsis ==
In the years leading up to the First World War, Colonel Redl of the Austrian army acts as a double agent for enemy powers.

== Cast ==
- Theodor Loos as Oberst Alfred Redl
- Lil Dagover as Vera Nikolayevna
- Otto Hartmann as Stephan Dolan, Ulanenleutnant
- Friedrich Hölzlin as Marchenko
- Alexander Murski as Daragaieff, Russian spy
- Werner Jansch as Chief of Russian spy service in Petersburg
- Michael von Newlinsky as Russian ambassador in Vienna
- Willy Bauer as General Conrad von Hoetzendorf
- Magnus Stifter as Colonel Umanizky, Head of the Evidence Office in Vienna
- Hans Götz as The Archduke
- Dr. Weinmann as Prague Corps Commander
- Philipp Veit as Police president in Vienna
- Leo Dudek as First Detective
- Rudolf Stadler as Second Detective
- Truda Grosslichtová as Franzi
- Luigi Bernauer as Cabaret singer in 'Trocadero'

== Bibliography ==
- Von Dassanowsky, Robert. Screening Transcendence: Film Under Austrofascism and the Hollywood Hope, 1933-1938. Indiana University Press, 2018
