= Call of the Blood (1929 film) =

1929 film

- Directed by: Victor Trivas
- Written by: Victor Trivas; Paul Schiller
- Starring: Vera Voronina; Jan Sviták; Oskar Marion
- Cinematography: Václav Vích
- Production companies: Moldavia Film; Akkord-Film
- Distributed by: Moldavia Film
- Release date: 1 November 1929
- Running time: 95 minutes
- Countries: Czechoslovakia; Germany
- Languages: Silent; German intertitles

Call of the Blood AKA Sinful Blood (Czech: Bujná krev; German: Aufruhr des Blutes) is a 1929 Czech-German silent film directed by Victor Trivas and starring Vera Voronina, Jan Sviták, and Oskar Marion. The film is considered lost.

== Cast ==
- Vera Voronina as Věra
- Jan Sviták as Salto
- Oskar Marion as Oskar
- Feodor Chaliapin Jr. as Fred
- George Seroff as Jiří (Georg)
