= Long Live with Dearly Departed =

1935 film

- Directed by: Martin Frič
- Written by: Martin Frič; Hugo Haas
- Starring: Hugo Haas
- Cinematography: Jan Stallich
- Edited by: Martin Frič
- Release date: 8 February 1935
- Running time: 86 minutes
- Country: Czechoslovakia
- Language: Czech

Long Live with Dearly Departed (Czech: Ať žije nebožtík) is a 1935 Czech comedy film directed by Martin Frič.

== Cast ==
- Hugo Haas as Petr Suk
- Adina Mandlová as Alice Machová
- Karel Hašler as Petr Kornel (as K. Hasler)
- Milada Gampeová as Barbora - Housekeeper
- Václav Trégl as Baltazar
- František Kreuzmann as Dr. Liska
- Ferdinand Hart as Remington
- Božena Svobodová as Remingtonová
- Jaroslav Marvan as Duriex
- Čeněk Šlégl
- Stanislav Neumann as Filip
- Antonín Vaverka as Pal
- Frantisek Cerný as Creditor
- Emilie Nitschová as Nurse
