= Josef Šváb-Malostranský =

Czech actor

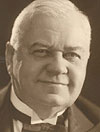
- Josef Šváb-Malostranský
- Born: 16 March 1860; Prague, Austrian Empire
- Died: 30 October 1932 (aged 72); Prague, Czechoslovakia
- Occupation(s): Actor, Writer

Josef Šváb-Malostranský (16 March 1860 – 30 October 1932) was a Czech actor, writer, cabaret singer, publisher, director and screenwriter. He owned a bookstore and song publishing house. He was the first Czech actor performing in three short films directed by Jan Kříženecký in 1898. He was also in the first Czech fully voiced film Když struny lkají in 1931. His niece was actress Zita Kabátová. He is buried at the Olšany Cemetery in Prague.

== Selected filmography ==
- Gypsies (1922)
- Lásky Kačenky Strnadové (1926)
- The Good Soldier Schweik (1926)
- Chudá holka (1929)
- Kantor Ideál (1932)
