= Hrdina jedné noci =

1935 Czechoslovak comedy film

- Directed by: Martin Frič
- Written by: Josef Neuberg; Sasa Razov; Jaroslav Kvapil
- Starring: Vlasta Burian
- Cinematography: Jan Stallich
- Edited by: Martin Frič
- Release date: 19 April 1935
- Running time: 91 minutes
- Country: Czechoslovakia
- Language: Czech

Hrdina jedné noci is a Czechoslovak comedy film directed by Martin Frič. It was released in 1935.

A German-language version, Held einer Nacht, was filmed at the same time.

== Cast ==
- Vlasta Burian - Florián Svícicka
- Truda Grosslichtová - Elvíra Thompsonová / statistka Hana
- Václav Trégl - Jarda, nezamestnaný
- Jaroslav Marvan - Starosta Zdislavic
- Jarmila Svabíková - Mayor's Wife
- Svetla Svozilová - Paní mistrová
- Eman Fiala - Exekutor
- Helena Monczáková - Exekutorova zena
- Jan Sviták - Filmový rezisér
- Ladislav Hemmer - Freddy, filmový herec
- Marie Ptáková - Hanina matka
- Čeněk Šlégl - Ucitel, clen obecní rady
- Frantisek Cerný - Postmistr, clen obecní rady
- Karel Postranecký - Veritel slecny Elvíry
- Marie Häusslerová - Grandmother
- Václav Piskácek - Town Councillor
