= Antonie Nedošinská =

Czech actress (1885–1950)

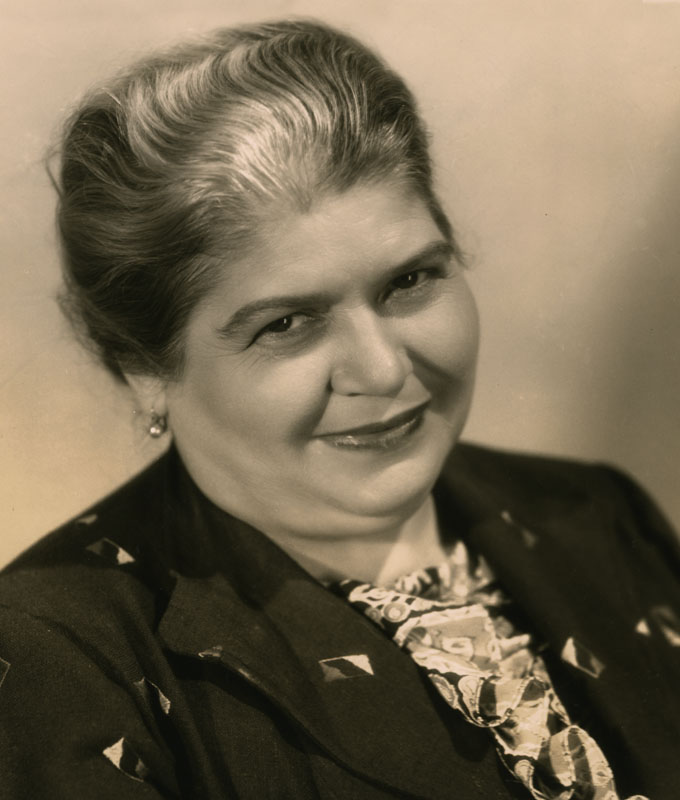
- Born: 26 June 1885; Prague, Bohemia, Austria-Hungary
- Died: 17 July 1950 (aged 65); Poděbrady, Czechoslovakia
- Occupation: Actress
- Years active: 1916–1947

Antonie Nedošinská (26 June 1885 – 17 July 1950) was a Czech film actress. She appeared in 89 films between 1916 and 1947.

== Selected filmography ==
- The Lantern (1925)
- Falešná kočička aneb Když si žena umíní (1926)
- Kainovo znamení (1928)
- Street Acquaintances (1929)
- Chudá holka (1930)
- The Last Bohemian (1931)
- The Ideal Schoolmaster (1932)
- The Ruined Shopkeeper (1933)
- Camel Through the Eye of a Needle (1936)
- Irca's Romance (1936)
- The Merry Wives (1938)
- Dívka v modrém (1940)
- In the Still of the Night (1941)
- Capek's Tales (1947)
