= Erotikon (1929 film) =

1929 Czechoslovak silent film

- Theatrical release poster
- Directed by: Gustav Machatý
- Screenplay by: Gustav Machatý
- Starring: Karel Schleichert; Ita Rina
- Cinematography: Václav Vích
- Production companies: Geem-Film; Slaviafilm
- Distributed by: Slaviafilm
- Release date: 27 February 1929
- Running time: 85 minutes
- Country: Czechoslovakia
- Languages: Silent with Czech intertitles

Erotikon (1929)

Erotikon is a 1929 silent erotic melodrama film by Czech director Gustav Machatý based on a screenplay by Vítězslav Nezval.

== Plot summary ==
Andrea, the innocent daughter of a rural railway guard, meets a worldly traveller named George when he takes shelter in her home during a storm. Left alone together, he seduces her and departs the next morning, treating the encounter as trivial. Andrea later discovers she is pregnant and leaves home in shame to give birth in secret, but the child is stillborn.

George continues a careless, pleasure-seeking life in the city, embarking upon a new relationship with the married Gilda. Meanwhile, Andrea is rescued by a respectable man, Hilbert, from an assault. During the struggle Hilbert is stabbed and Andrea provides the blood transfusion needed to save his life. She later marries him, seeking stability and security.

However, when Andrea encounters George again, her unresolved feelings resurface, and they resume their relationship despite her marriage. Andrea plans to leave Hilbert for George, but she finally realises he is a womaniser. Gilda's husband tracks down George and shoots him dead. Andrea returns to Hilbert before her absence has been noticed.

== Cast ==
- Olaf Fjord as George Sydney, a travelling seducer
- Ita Rina as Andrea, an innocent girl
- Karel Schleichert as Andrea's father, the railway crossing keeper
- Theodor Pištěk as Hilbert
- Charlotte Susa as Gilda
- Luigi Serventi as Jan

== Production ==
The shooting started in November 1928. Exterior scenes were shot in Prague and Karlovy Vary. Machatý and his cinematographer Václav Vích used modern American lenses, making the image very soft. Production designers were Julius von Borsody and Alexandr Hackenschmied.

== Release ==
The premiere was held in Karlovy Vary on 27 February 1929. The movie was praised by critics for its Soviet-style montage and visual storytelling through symbolic imagery; however, most journalists criticised its weak story.

=== Versions ===
In 1933 Czech and German sound versions were made with music by Erno Košťál. Both versions were substantially cut. The movie was reconstructed by the Czech Film Archive in 1994 with new chamber music by Jan Klusák. Klusák composed alternative music score for full orchestra in 1995. A digital restoration was presented in Prague in January 2026 with a new music score by Jana Vöröšová.
