= Král ulice =

- Directed by: Miroslav Cikán
- Screenplay by: Miroslav Cikán and Karel Hašler
- Story by: Jirí Zoch
- Starring: Karel Hašler, Markéta Krausová, and Helena Bušová.
- Cinematography: Václav Vích
- Music by: Karel Hašler
- Release date: 1935
- Running time: 87 minutes
- Country: Czechoslovakia

Král ulice is a 1935 Czechoslovak romantic drama film, directed by Miroslav Cikán. It stars Karel Hašler, Markéta Krausová, and Helena Bušová.

== Cast ==
- Karel Hašler as Martin Antoni
- Markéta Krausová as Martin's wife
- Helena Bušová as Martin's daughter Helena
- Jára Kohout as Jura
- Oldrich Vykypel as Jan Pokorný, violinist
- Sylva Langova as Nanynka, Pokorný's sister
- Milada Smolíková as Márinka Heinrichová, housewife by Martin
- Bedřich Vrbský as the Police inspector
- Zdenek Gina Hasler as Robert Stanley
