= A Woman Who Knows What She Wants =

1934 film

- Directed by: Václav Binovec
- Written by: Alfred Grünwald (libretto); Oscar Straus (libretto); Vilém Werner; Jaroslav Mottl
- Starring: Markéta Krausová; Jiří Steimar; Truda Grosslichtová
- Cinematography: Jan Stallich; Otto Heller
- Edited by: Antonín Zelenka
- Music by: Oscar Straus
- Production company: Meissner
- Distributed by: Slavia-film
- Release date: 31 August 1934
- Running time: 90 minutes
- Country: Czechoslovakia
- Language: Czech

A Woman Who Knows What She Wants (Czech: Žena, která ví co chce) is a 1934 Czech musical comedy film directed by Václav Binovec and starring Markéta Krausová, Jiří Steimar, and Truda Grosslichtová. It is an adaptation of a 1932 stage musical of the same title, with music by Oscar Straus. A German-language version of the film was made at the same time with different cast and crew. The musical was adapted again as a 1958 West German film of the same title.

== Cast ==
- Markéta Krausová as Mona Cavallini, Revuestar
- Jiří Steimar as Alexander Rón, industrialist
- Truda Grosslichtová as Věra, their daughter
- Růžena Šlemrová as Babetta, Manon's friend
- František Paul as Secretary Anatol Veverka
- Zvonimir Rogoz as Banker Klika
- Vladimír Borský as Secretary Jan Rožek
- Karel Třešňák as Vicepresident of Steelworks
- Věra Ferbasová as Stenotypist
- Josef Zezulka as Secretary of the theatre
