= Když struny lkají =

1930 film

- Directed by: Friedrich Fehér
- Written by: Quido E. Kujal; Josef Kodíček
- Based on: The Devil by Leo Tolstoy
- Cinematography: Václav Vích
- Edited by: Friedrich Fehér
- Music by: František Alois Tichý
- Production company: A-B
- Distributed by: Elektafilm
- Release date: 19 September 1930
- Running time: 63 minutes
- Country: Czechoslovakia
- Language: Czech

Když struny lkají (English: When the Strings Wailed) is a 1930 Czechoslovak drama film directed by Friedrich Fehér. It is considered the first Czechoslovak film fully made with synchronized sound.

== Cast ==
- Václav Vydra as Farmer Michovský
- Magda Sonja as Slávka, Michovský's wife
- Hans Feher as Jeníček, Michovský's son
- Jaroslav Kocian as Marek
- Olga Augustová as Lady in a bar
- Hugo Haas as Gentleman in a bar
- Marie Tauberová as Bar visitor
- Milka Balek-Brodská as Nováková
- Josef Loskot as Michovský's guest
- Čeněk Šlégl as Toman
- Josef Rovenský as Skála
- Otto Rubík as Officer Prokop
- Rudolf Nížkovský as Bartender
- Josef Šváb-Malostranský as Bar patron
- Filip Balek-Brodský as Bar patron
