= Street Acquaintances (1929 film) =

1929 film

- Directed by: Josef Medeotti-Bohác; Alwin Neuß
- Written by: Jaroslav Mencík
- Starring: Theodor Pištěk; Blanka Svobodová; Kitty Barling; Werner Pittschau
- Cinematography: Otto Heller
- Production company: AB Film
- Distributed by: Starfilm
- Release date: 11 January 1929
- Countries: Czechoslovakia; Germany
- Languages: Silent; German intertitles

Street Acquaintances (German: Strassenbekanntschaften) is a 1929 Czech-German silent film directed by Josef Medeotti-Bohác and Alwin Neuß and starring Theodor Pištěk, Blanka Svobodová and Kitty Barling.

It was shot in Prague. The film's sets were designed by Alois Mecera.

== Cast ==
- Theodor Pištěk as Urban
- Blanka Svobodová as Otýlie
- Kitty Barling as Zdenka
- Hilde Maroff as Ema
- Nino Costantini as Florián Krauseminz
- Werner Pittschau as Jaroslav Klement
- Václav Zichovský as Factory Owner
- André Mattoni as Vladimír Skála
- Rosa Monetti as Marketa Skálová
- Jan Richter as Zelenka
- Antonie Nedošinská as Zelenka's Wife
- Máňa Ženíšková as Mána
- Jiří Hron as Václav
- Hugh Douglas as Alfréd Snajdr a.k.a. Baron Freddy
- Jindřich Plachta as Urban's Servant
- Filip Bálek-Brodský as Wedding Guest
- Milka Bálek-Brodská as Wedding Guest's Wife
- Jindřich Lhoták as Doctor
- Rudolf Stahl as Detective
- Frank Argus as Inspector
- Jindřich Edl as Commissioner
- Betty Kysilková as Woman in Eden
- Eduard Slégl as Servant

== Bibliography ==
- Alfred Krautz. Encyclopedia of film directors in the United States of America and Europe, Volume 2. Saur, 1997.
