= Lawyer Vera =

1937 Czechoslovak comedy film

- Directed by: Martin Frič
- Written by: Václav Wasserman; Vlasta Zemanová
- Starring: Truda Grosslichtová
- Cinematography: Ferdinand Pecenka
- Edited by: Jan Kohout
- Release date: 30 April 1937
- Running time: 79 minutes
- Country: Czechoslovakia
- Language: Czech

Lawyer Vera (Czech: Advokátka Věra) is a 1937 Czechoslovak comedy film directed by Martin Frič.

== Cast ==
- Truda Grosslichtová as JUDr. Vera Donátová
- Růžena Šlemrová as Ruzena Donátová
- Theodor Pištěk as Jindrich Donát
- Oldřich Nový as Petr 'Tygr' Kucera
- Bedřich Veverka as Eman Pálený
- Ladislav H. Struna as Dlouhý Gusta
- Rudolf Deyl as Consul Raboch
- Stanislav Neumann as Richard Raboch
- Jaroslav Marvan as Grocery Store Proprietor
- Darja Hajská as Marie
- Karel Veverka as JUDr. Basus
- Václav Trégl as The Solicitor [oktabec]
- Čeněk Šlégl as Karel Benda
- Jiří Hron as Jan Vrzal
- Václav Vydra as Emil Cipra (as Václav ml. Vydra)
