= Jan Sviták =

Czech actor and film director

- Born: December 23, 1898; Plzeň, Bohemia, Austria-Hungary
- Died: May 11, 1945 (aged 46); Prague, Czechoslovakia
- Occupation(s): Film director, actor
- Years active: 1928-1945
- Spouse: Vilma Kocourková-Svitáková

Jan Sviták (23 December 1898 – 11 May 1945) was a Czech actor and film director. He was an important exponent of Czechoslovak film in the interwar period and during World War II. Sviták was murdered shortly after the liberation of Prague in 1945.

== Biography ==
=== Early life ===
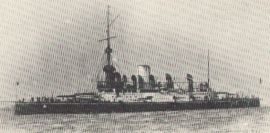
SMS Wien sank on 10 December 1917. Future Czech film director Jan Sviták was aboard.

Sviták was born in Plzeň, where his father worked as a clerk for the Škoda Plzeň company. During World War I, he studied at the Naval School in Pula and joined the Austro-Hungarian Navy. He was a crewman on the battleship SMS Wien, which was sunk on 10 December 1917. Sviták was not physically harmed in the catastrophe, and soon after, he was awarded the Bravery Medal but the sinking was a traumatic experience. It permanently marked his life, particularly his underlying attitudes and mental state. With the end of the War and the establishment of the Czechoslovak State, he devoted himself to the theatre. He was engaged as an actor by travelling theatre companies and went on perform in the theatres in Olomouc, Ostrava, and Bratislava (as an ensemble member of the Slovak National Theatre), and at the National Theatre in Prague. His performances drew positive responses. Several Austrian critics remarked his acting talents during his engagement in Vienna. In the 1930s, he was engaged by the theatre owned by the interwar Czechoslovak film and theatre star, Vlasta Burian.

Sviták took his first film parts in the late 1920s. His first roles in this silent era were in Podskalák, Plukovník Švec, and Hříšná krev. These early roles were minor and rather stereotypical – army officers, adventurers, and smooth intriguers. He took his first directorial steps in 1932/33, under Josef Rovenský's supervision, and soon became a prominent filmmaker in Czechoslovakia. In 1939, Sviták became director of the Foja film studios, in the Prague district Radice, and took increasing responsibility for the administrative and organizational aspects of film-making.

=== Activities in the Protectorate of Bohemia and Moravia ===
In 1939, after the invasion of German troops, Czechoslovakia ceased to exist and split into two countries. Nazi Germany established the Protectorate of Bohemia and Moravia in the central part of the Czech Lands, and Slovakia became a nominally independent state. In the Nazi-administered Protectorate, Sviták continued his activities in the film industry. Up to 1941, he directed 15 films, the most popular of which was (and still is) Přednosta Stanice, starring Vlasta Burian and Jaroslav Marvan. He was given the directorship of the Filmprüfstelle, a German institute controlling the film production and censorship in the Protectorate. It was an important post. As a director, Sviták had to negotiate with German representatives, and his decisions were subordinated to their authority. This led to speculation that he was a Nazi collaborator. According to some testimonies, he used his position and influence to obtain the release of certain Czech political prisoners: after the War, the Czech actress and writer Jarmila Svatá testified that she escaped arrest by the Nazis, mainly thanks to Sviták's intervention. Sviták remained a close friend of the passionate anti-Nazi activist, reporter, and journalist František Kocourek. On several occasions, he warned Kocourek to be more discreet; he also managed to stop two investigations into Kocourek's activities. Despite this, Kocourek later was murdered in Auschwitz-Birkenau. Sviták also tried to warn the prominent Czech singer and actor Karel Hašler, who was later murdered in Nazi concentration camp Mauthausen. Sviták's situation during World War II was complicated. While he used his office to mitigate some of the worst effects of the Nazi occupation within his circle, he worked and negotiated with Nazism's representatives in the Protectorate of Bohemia and Moravia. His wartime role was therefore assessed negatively by the Czech public.

=== Death ===
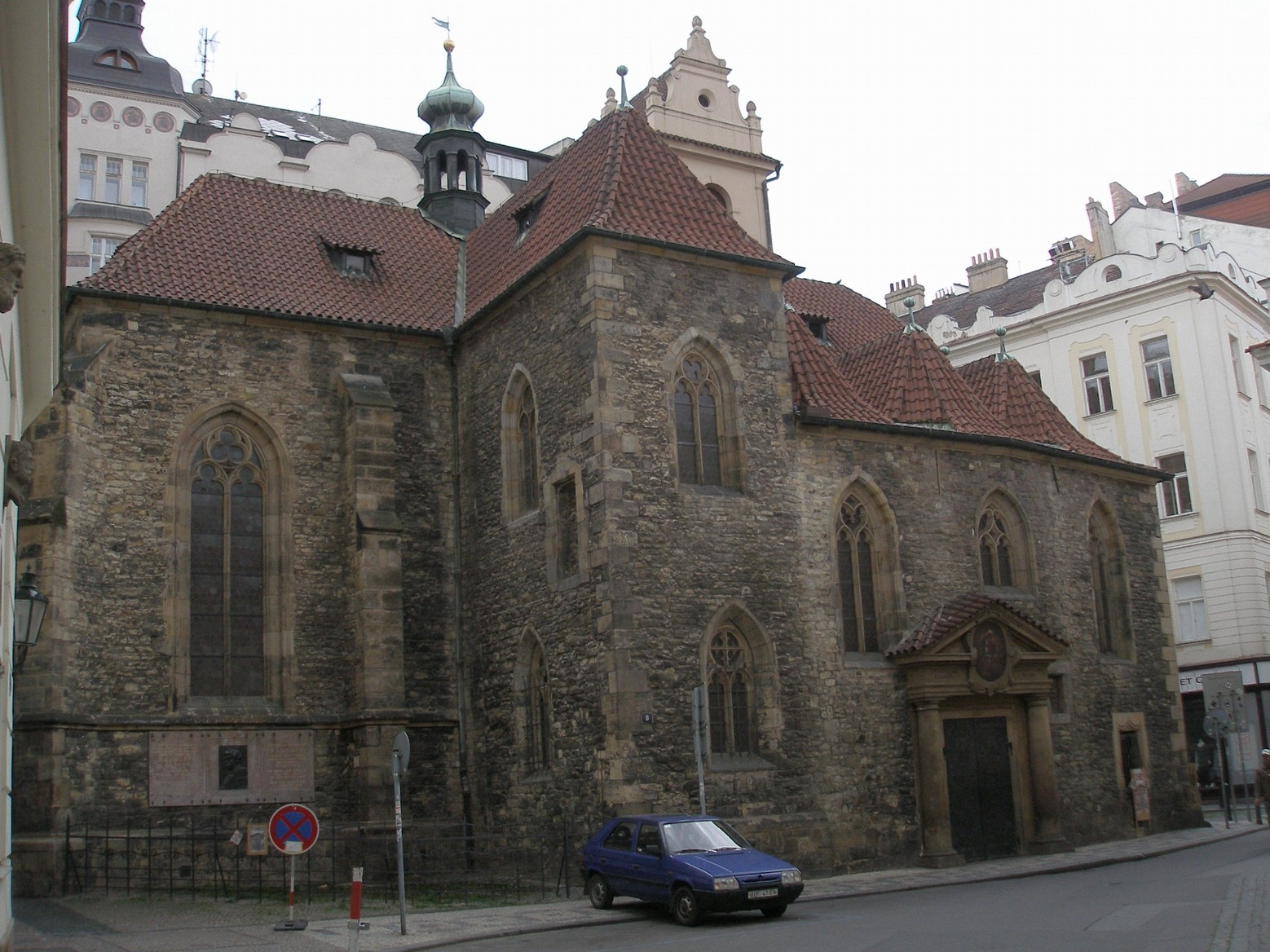
Jan Sviták was murdered in front of the Church of St. Martin in the Wall, Prague.

On 10 May 1945, in the first days after the liberation of Prague, a group led by one of Sviták's closest collaborators in office broke into Sviták's flat and took him for interrogation at the police station in Bartolomějská Street. He was detained there overnight but was released the following morning, only to fall into the hands of a "fanatical mob" bent on revenge. He was dragged to the front of the Church of St. Martin in the Wall. Half-naked and scared, Sviták faced the attacks of the crowd, among them some of his erstwhile colleagues. A passing Soviet soldier noticed the lynching and asked what was going on. People shouted that Sviták deserved death as a traitor and Nazi informer who had denounced Hašler and others. The soldier shot Sviták in the head. After several hours, Sviták's wife found his dead body lying on the street. He was buried in Plzeň. Later, the Czech journalist Stanislav Motl attempted to gather the facts about Sviták's war activities and death in the book Mraky nad Barrandovem. However, the circumstances of his death and his alleged collaboration with Nazis were never properly investigated. The Czech director Otakar Vávra later commented: "It was a lynching. It was a time when people started to seek revenge for the whole period of occupation. And they revenged on anything that came to hand. No justice. No trials. That was out of the question. The first time [after the war] was like this."

== Filmography ==
=== Director ===
- Anita v ráji (1934)
- Dokud máš maminku (1934)
- Život vojenský - život veselý (1934)
- Grand Hotel Nevada (1935)
- Milan Rastislav Štefánik (1935)
- Pan otec Karafiát (1935)
- Divoch (1936)
- Divoch (German version) (1936)
- Rozvod paní Evy (1937)
- Srdce na kolejích (1937)
- Třetí zvonění (1938)
- Srdce v celofánu (1939)
- U svatého Matěje (1939)
- Poslední Podskalák (1940)
- Station Master (1941)

=== Actor ===
- Podskalák (1928)
- Call of the Blood (1929)
- Plukovník Švec (1929)
- Tonka of the Gallows (1930)
- Aféra plukovníka Redla (1931)
- Karel Havlíček Borovský (1931)
- The Affair of Colonel Redl (1931)
- Miláček pluku (1931)
- On a jeho sestra (1931)
- Psohlavci (1931)
- Pudr a benzin (1931)
- Třetí rota (1931)
- Extase (1932)
- Extase (Austrian version, 1932)
- Funebrák (1932)
- Lelíček ve službách Sherlocka Holmese (1932)
- Malostranští mušketýři (1932)
- Načeradec král kibiců (1932)
- Její lékař (1933)
- Řeka (1933)
- Štvaní lidé (1933)
- The Mystery of the Blue Room (1933)
- Dokud máš maminku (1934)
- Za řádovými dveřmi (1934)
- Život vojenský - život veselý (1934)
- Hrdina jedné noci (1935)
- Jánošík (1935)
- Irca's Romance (1936)
- Páter Vojtěch (1936)
- Hrdinové hranic (1938)
- Píseň lásky (1940)
