= Václav Vydra (actor, born 1876) =

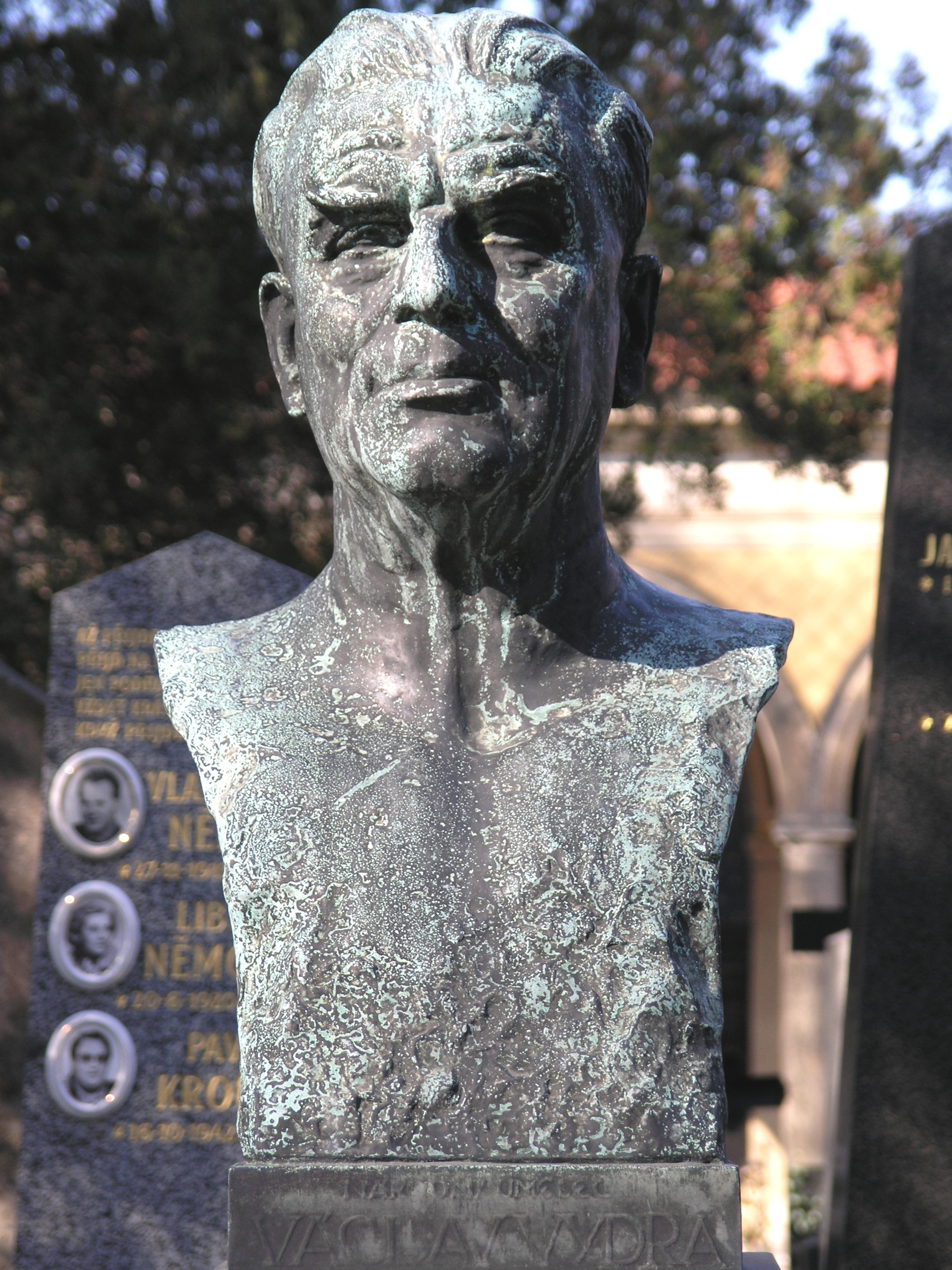
- Born: 29 April 1876; Plzeň, Austria-Hungary (now Czech Republic)
- Died: 7 April 1953 (aged 76); Prague
- Occupations: Film actor, stage actor
- Years active: 1914 - 1953

Václav Vydra (29 April 1876 – 7 April 1953), was a Czech film and stage actor. He starred in 31 films between 1914 and 1953.

Vydra was also a noted stage actor, acting in the Vinohrady Theater and National Theater playing major roles of the characters in plays by William Shakespeare, Karel Čapek, and others. From 1945 to 1949, he was director of the National Theater; as both a member of the Communist Party and the head of the National Theater, Vydra was one of the most powerful figures in Czech theater in the post-war era. In 1946 he became the first actor awarded the National Artist title.

His grandson, Václav Vydra, born 1956, is also a notable actor.

== Selected filmography ==
- Když struny lkají (1930)
- Skeleton on Horseback (1937)
- Lawyer Vera (1937)
- The Merry Wives (1938)
- Enchanted (1942)
