= Life Is a Dog =

1933 film

- Theatrical release poster
- Directed by: Martin Frič
- Written by: Martin Frič; Hugo Haas
- Starring: Hugo Haas; Adina Mandlová
- Cinematography: Václav Vích
- Edited by: Martin Frič
- Music by: Pavel Haas
- Production company: Moldaviafilm
- Distributed by: Moldaviafilm
- Release date: 1 December 1933
- Running time: 88 minutes
- Country: Czechoslovakia
- Language: Czech

Life Is a Dog (Czech: Život je pes) is a 1933 Czech comedy film written and directed by Martin Frič.

== Cast ==
- Hugo Haas as Composer Viktor Honzl / Professor Alfréd Rokos
- Theodor Pištěk as Hynek Durdys
- Adina Mandlová as Eva Durdysová
- Světla Svozilová as Helena Durdysová
- Ferdinand Hart as Ralph Morrison
- Alois Dvorský as Landlord
- Jára Kohout as Man buying a record
- František Jerhot as Officer
- Antonín Hodr as Netušil
- Karel Český as Customer
- Přemysl Pražský as Forger

== See also ==
- The Double Fiance (1934)
