= The Ruined Shopkeeper =

1933 film

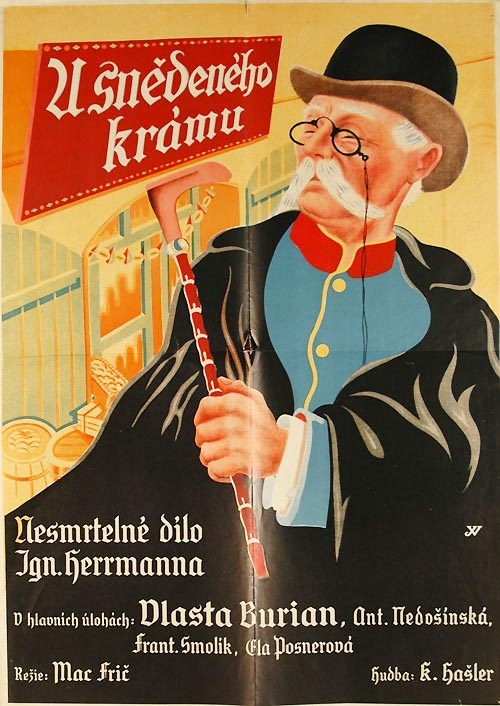
- Directed by: Martin Frič
- Written by: Václav Wasserman; Ignát Herrmann
- Starring: Vlasta Burian
- Cinematography: Václav Vích
- Edited by: Martin Frič
- Release date: 1933
- Running time: 97 minutes
- Country: Czechoslovakia
- Language: Czech

The Ruined Shopkeeper (Czech: U snědeného krámu) is a Czech comedy film directed by Martin Frič. It was released in 1933.

== Cast ==
- Vlasta Burian as Kyllian
- František Smolík as Martin Zemla
- Antonie Nedošinská as Katerina Sustrova
- Ela Poznerová as Pavlína
