= Poor Girl =

1930 film

- Directed by: Martin Frič
- Written by: Martin Frič
- Based on: Chudá holka by Václav Čech-Stráň
- Starring: Suzanne Marwille
- Cinematography: Jan Stallich
- Music by: Jára Beneš (1932)
- Production companies: Fortuna Film; Ringlerfilm (1932)
- Distributed by: Fortuna Film; Ringlerfilm (1932)
- Release date: 28 February 1930
- Country: Czechoslovakia
- Language: Silent

Chudá holka is a 1930 silent Czech melodrama film directed by Martin Frič. Originally a silent film, it was re-released in theatres in 1932 set to music and songs of Jára Beneš.

== Cast ==
- Suzanne Marwille as Marie Růžová
- Blanka Svobodová as Mrs. Rivolová
- Karel Fiala as Miller Bořický
- Antonie Nedošinská as Bořický's wife
- Otto Rubík as JUDr. Klement Bořický
- Josef Rovenský as Alois Mokráček
- Emilie Nitschová as Mokráček's wife
- Eman Fiala as Berka
- Jan W. Speerger as Architekt Robert Jánský
- Ela Poznerová as Věra, Jánský's wife
- Milka Balek-Brodská as Prostitute Tereza
- Josef Šváb-Malostranský as Singer
