= Karl Anton =

German film director

- Anton, c. 1933
- Born: 25 October 1898; Prague, Kingdom of Bohemia, Austria-Hungary
- Died: 12 April 1979 (aged 80); West Berlin, West Germany
- Other names: Karel Anton, Charles Anton
- Occupations: Film director Screenwriter; Film producer
- Years active: 1922–1963
- Spouses: Olga Chekhova (divorced) Ruth Buchardt–Hansen (m. 1940)

Karl Anton or Karel Anton (25 October 1898 – 12 April 1979) was a Bohemian-born German film director, screenwriter, and film producer.

== Biography ==
He was born in Prague on 25 October 1898. His father, Wilhelm Anton (1861–1918) was a physician. Anton studied medicine, but left school after his father's death. He started as a stage actor and director in Vienna, Linz and Prague. During the World War I, Anton made amateur documentaries with his friends Karel Lamač and Otto Heller. He directed his first movie, a lyrical drama Gypsies, in 1921. Anton is considered an early proponent of Czech lyrical cinema tradition. He founded his own production companies Antonfilm (1923–1930) and Sonorfilm (1930–1932).

After the international success of Tonka of the Gallows he worked in Paris for Paramount Pictures from 1932 to 1935. After leaving Paramount he moved to Germany in 1935. He died in West Berlin in 1979. Czech actor Raoul Schránil was his cousin.

== Selected filmography ==
- Gypsies (1922)
- The Kidnapping of Fux the Banker (1923)
- The May Fairy (1926)
- Tonka of the Gallows (1930)
- A Girl from the Reeperbahn (1930)
- The Affair of Colonel Redl (1931)
- The Case of Colonel Redl (1931)
- Monsieur Albert (1932)
- Make-Up (1932)
- The Champion Cook (1932)
- Simone Is Like That (1933)
- The Naked Truth (1932)
- Number 33 (1933)
- Nothing But Lies (1933)
- The Porter from Maxim's (1933)
- Monsieur Sans-Gêne (1935)
- Happy Arenas (1935)
- White Slaves (1936)
- Martha (1936)
- We Danced Around the World (1939)
- The Star of Rio (1940)
- People in the Storm (1941)
- The Thing About Styx (1942)
- The Big Number (1943)
- The Impostor (1944)
- Peter Voss, Thief of Millions (1946)
- Barry (1949)
- The Appeal to Conscience (1949)
- The Exchange (1952)
- The Cousin from Nowhere (1953)
- The Rose of Stamboul (1953)
- We'll Talk About Love Later (1953)
- Clivia (1954)
- Bonjour Kathrin (1956)
- The Daring Swimmer (1957)
- Victor and Victoria (1957)
- The Avenger (1960)
