= The Affair of Colonel Redl =

1931 film directed by Karel Anton

- Directed by: Karel Anton
- Written by: Karel Tobis; Ruda Jurist
- Starring: Emil Artur Longen; Marie Grossová
- Cinematography: Eduard Hoesch; Václav Vích
- Edited by: Karel Anton
- Music by: Willy Engel-Berger
- Production company: Elektafilm
- Distributed by: Elektafilm
- Release date: 20 February 1931
- Running time: 98 minutes
- Country: Czechoslovakia
- Language: Czech

The Affair of Colonel Redl (Czech: Aféra plukovníka Redla) is a Czech drama film directed by Karel Anton. German version of the movie The Case of Colonel Redl was released in 1931. The film is considered lost.

== Cast ==
- Emil Artur Longen as Alfred Redl
- Marie Grossová as Countess Vera Nikolayevna
- Jiří Sedláček as Štěpán Dolan
- Truda Grosslichtová as Eva, Dolan's fiancée
- Jan Sviták as Count Boris Maximovich Marchenko
- Josef Rovenský as Russian spy Daragiyev
- Čeněk Šlégl as Archduke
- Jiří Steimar as Head of Russian Secret service

== See also ==
- Colonel Redl (1925) Austrian film
- Colonel Redl (1985) Hungarian film
