= The May Fairy =

1926 film directed by Karl Anton

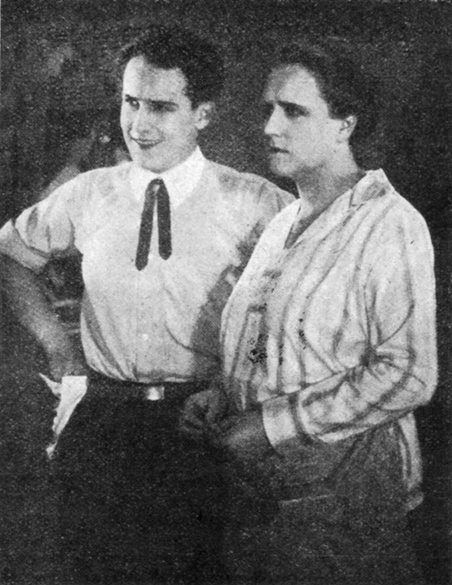
- George Voskovec and Božena Svobodová
- Czech: Pohádka máje
- Directed by: Karl Anton
- Written by: Václav Wasserman
- Based on: Pohádka máje by Vilém Mrštík
- Starring: Ferdinand Kaňkovský; Anna Opplová
- Cinematography: Václav Vích
- Production company: Elektajournal
- Distributed by: Julius Schmitt
- Release date: 25 December 1926
- Running time: 115 minutes
- Country: Czechoslovakia
- Languages: Silent; Czech intertitles

The May Fairy (Czech: Pohádka máje) is a 1926 Czech silent romance film directed by Karl Anton based on a Vilém Mrštík's novel. It is credited with helping to introduce the tradition of lyricism in Czech cinema. It was shot in several locations including Prague and Vienna. Another adaptation of the novel was made in 1940 by Otakar Vávra.

== Cast ==
- Ferdinand Kaňkovský as Forester
- Anna Opplová as Forester's Wife
- Anita Janová as Helenka
- Jarmila Horáková as Gusta
- Berta Reifová as Albína
- George Voskovec as Ríša
- Ludvík Veverka as Ríša's Friend
- Antonín Marek as Priest
- Betty Kysilková as Priest's Housekeeper
- Božena Svobodová as Ríša's Landlady
- Mary Jansová as Waiter
- Marie Počepická as Marta
- František Fišer as Jenyš
- Saša Dobrovolná as Jenyš's Mother
- Jindřich Lhoták as Nikolaus von Rittenburg
- Jan Richter as Policeman
- Ladislav H. Struna as Pimp
- Helena Zmatlíková as Helenka

== Release ==
The film was reconstructed in 2005 and re-released in cinemas with live music by Neuvěřitelno.
