= Ulice zpívá =

1939 Czech comedy film

Ulice zpívá is a Czech comedy film with Vlasta Burian. It was released in 1939.
