= The Heroic Captain Korkorán =

- Directed by: Miroslav Cikán
- Written by: Miroslav Cikán; Emil Artur Longen; Jaroslav Mottl
- Produced by: Vladimír Kabelík
- Starring: Vlasta Burian
- Cinematography: Václav Vích
- Edited by: Antonín Zelenka
- Release date: 24 August 1934
- Country: Czechoslovakia
- Language: Czech

Hrdinný kapitán Korkorán (The Heroic Captain Korkorán) is a 1934 Czech comedy film directed by Miroslav Cikán. It stars Vlasta Burian, Jiřina Štěpničková and Milada Smolíková. The film is about a Prague skipper who dreams of commanding ships on the high seas but is stuck with running a small steamboat on the Vltava river.

== Cast ==
- Vlasta Burian - Adam Korkorán
- Jiřina Štěpničková - Irena Svobodová
- Milada Smolíková - Mrs. Broniková
- Theodor Pištěk - Mr. Dlouhý
- Jaroslav Marvan - Inspektor paroplavební spolecnosti
- Svetla Svozilová - Chambermaid
- Čeněk Šlégl - Emeritus admiral Piacci
- Ladislav Hemmer - Secretary
- Eman Fiala - Stoker
- Josef Kotalík - Director of the steam-navigation
- Bohumil Mottl - Vláda
- Karel Nemec - Servant
- Karel Postranecký - Balvan, greaser
- Jan W. Speerger - Rating
- Josef Waltner - Hotel manager
