= Vladimír Borský =

Czech actor, screenwriter, director

- Born: 2 March 1904; Prague, Bohemia, Austro-Hungarian Empire
- Died: 24 October 1962 (aged 58); Prague, Czechoslovakia
- Other name: Wladimir Borsky
- Occupations: Actor, Director, Writer
- Years active: 1926–1961 (film)

Vladimír Borský (1904–1962) was a Czech film actor, screenwriter and film director.

== Selected filmography ==
- A Woman Who Knows What She Wants (1934)
- The Last Man (1934)
- Volga in Flames (1934)
- Three Men in the Snow (1936)
- The Seamstress (1936)
- A Foolish Girl (1938)
- Ladies in Waiting (1940)
- Warriors of Faith (1947)

== Bibliography ==
- Peter Hames. Czech and Slovak Cinema. Edinburgh University Press, 2010.
