= Škola základ života =

1938 Czechoslovak comedy film

- Directed by: Martin Frič
- Written by: Václav Wasserman; Jaroslav Zák
- Starring: Theodor Pištěk
- Cinematography: Jan Stallich
- Edited by: Jan Kohout
- Release date: 11 November 1938
- Running time: 92 minutes
- Country: Czechoslovakia
- Language: Czech

Škola základ života is a 1938 Czechoslovak comedy film directed by Martin Frič.
