= Čeněk Šlégl =

Czech actor

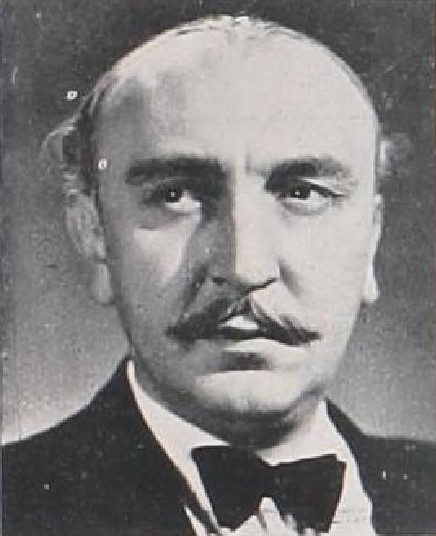
- Šlégl in 1939
- Born: 30 September 1899; Prague, Bohemia, Austria-Hungary
- Died: 17 February 1970 (aged 70); Prague, Czechoslovakia
- Occupation: Actor
- Years active: 1919–1941

Čeněk Šlégl (30 September 1899 – 17 February 1970) was a Czech film actor. He appeared in 68 films between 1919 and 1941.

== Selected filmography ==
- Never the Twain (1926)
- Prague Seamstresses (1929)
- Sin of a Beautiful Woman (1929)
- Imperial and Royal Field Marshal (1930)
- Když struny lkají (1930)
- Černé oči, proč pláčete...? (1930)
- Business Under Distress (1931)
- The Affair of Colonel Redl (1931)
- Anton Spelec, Sharp-Shooter (1932)
- The Ideal Schoolmaster (1932)
- Public Not Admitted (1933)
- Hrdinný kapitán Korkorán (1934)
- Hrdina jedné noci (1935)
- Long Live with Dearly Departed (1935)
- Irca's Romance (1936)
- Lawyer Vera (1937)
- Tři vejce do skla (1937)
- Ducháček Will Fix It (1938)
- Škola základ života (1938)
- U pokladny stál... (1939)
- Christian (1939)
- The Catacombs (1940)
- Baron Prášil (1940)
- The Blue Star Hotel (1941)
