= A Foolish Girl =

- Scene from a film
- Czech: Bláhové devce
- Directed by: Václav Binovec
- Written by: Jan Kaplan; Maryna Radomerská; Bedrich Wermuth
- Produced by: Frantisek Moravek
- Starring: Hana Vítová; Vladimír Borský; Zita Kabátová
- Cinematography: Bohumil Vích
- Edited by: Marie Bourová
- Production company: Elektafilm
- Release date: 1938
- Running time: 100 minutes
- Country: Czechoslovakia
- Language: Czech

A Foolish Girl (Czech: Bláhové devce) is a 1938 Czech romance film directed by Václav Binovec and starring Hana Vítová, Vladimír Borský and Zita Kabátová.

The film's sets were designed by the art director Alois Mecera.

== Cast ==
- Hana Vítová as Verona Králová
- Vladimír Borský as Michal Jones
- Zita Kabátová as Albína Rybinova
- Frantisek Kreuzmann as Pavlat
- Marenka Zieglerová as Sadlova
- Bohus Záhorský as Rybin
- Rene Kubinsky as Orchestra Leader
- Jaroslav Marvan as Kosina, Jonesuv strýc
- Pavla Stolzová as Verona's Mother
- Zdenka Sulanová as Lidia
- Frána Vajner as Curtain Puller
- Karel Veverka as Theater Executive
- Theodor Pistek as Theater Porter
- Jirí Plachý as Theater Manager
- F. X. Mlejnek as Theater Worker
- Jára Pospísil as Operetta Singer
- Frantisek Sasek as Operetta Singer
- Jan Cerný as Jeweller
- Jirí Hron as Telephone Operator
- Filip Balek-Brodský as Audience Member
- Frantisek Beranský as Audience Member
- Jaroslav Bráska as Audience Member
- Robert Ford as Audience Member
- Bolek Prchal as Audience Member
- Marie Vildová as Audience Member
- Vladimír Smíchovský as Audience Member
- Selteri as chorus
- Rudolf Macharovsky as dancer
- Eliska Slancová as dancer
- Jirí Schreinzer
- Josef Cikán
- Ladislav Janecek
- Eliska Jílková
- Jirina Hladikova
- Josef Horánek
- Betty Kysilková
- Josef Sládek
- Milka Balek-Brodská
- Václav Mlckovský
- Frantisek Paul
- Viktor Socha
- Alena Pospísilová
- Hermína Vojtová
