= Irca's Romance =

- Directed by: Karel Hašler
- Written by: Karel Hašler; Josef Roden (novel)
- Starring: Jiřina Steimarová; Rolf Wanka; Theodor Pištěk
- Cinematography: Jan Roth
- Edited by: Marie Bourová; Svatopluk Innemann
- Music by: Rudolf Maria Mandée
- Production company: Meissner Film Prague
- Distributed by: Meissner Film Prague
- Release date: 1936
- Country: Czechoslovakia
- Language: Czech

Irca's Romance (Czech: Irčin románek) is a 1936 Czech romance film directed by Karel Hašler and starring Jiřina Steimarová, Rolf Wanka and Theodor Pištěk. It was one of several Czech films of the 1930s to involve a trip to an Adriatic resort. A separate German-language version Escape to the Adriatic was made in a co-production with Austria.

It was shot at the Barrandov Studios in Prague.

== Cast ==
- Rolf Wanka as Lexa Hora
- Jiřina Steimarová as Irča Minovská
- Theodor Pištěk as Tomáš Minovský
- František Paul as Ing. Harry Peters
- Truda Grosslichtová as Singer Lola
- Antonie Nedošinská as Šulcová
- Čeněk Šlégl as Engineer
- Jan W. Speerger as Kraus
- Jan Sviták as Private detective
- Eliška Pleyová as Bar Lady
- Ella Nollová as Landlady
- Běla Tringlerová as Boarding school student
- Eva Prchlíková as Boarding school student
- Milka Balek-Brodská as Director
- Rudolf Maria Mandée as Pianist
- Bohumil Hes as Tourist

== Bibliography ==
- Leen Engelen & Kris Van Heuckelom. European Cinema after the Wall: Screening East-West Mobility. Rowman & Littlefield, 2013.
