= Ecstasy (film) =

1933 erotic film directed by Gustav Machatý

- French theatrical release poster
- Directed by: Gustav Machatý
- Written by: Jacques A. Koerpel
- Screenplay by: František Horký; Gustav Machatý
- Story by: Robert Horký
- Produced by: Moriz Grunhut; Gustav Machatý
- Starring: Hedy Lamarr; Aribert Mog; Zvonimir Rogoz
- Cinematography: Hans Androschin; Jan Stallich
- Edited by: Antonín Zelenka
- Music by: Giuseppe Becce
- Production companies: Elektafilm; Gustav Machatý Productions; Kouzlo Films
- Distributed by: Slaviafilm (CS); Eureka Productions (US)
- Release date: 20 January 1933 (Czechoslovakia)
- Running time: 89 minutes
- Country: Czechoslovakia
- Languages: Czech; German; French
- Box office: $1.5 million (US rentals)

Ecstasy (Czech: Extase; French: Extase; German: Ekstase) is a 1933 Czech erotic romantic drama film directed by Gustav Machatý and starring Hedy Lamarr (then Hedy Kiesler), Aribert Mog, and Zvonimir Rogoz. Machatý won the award for Best Director for this film at the 1934 Venice Film Festival.

The film is about a young woman who marries a wealthy but much older man. After abandoning her brief passionless marriage, she meets a young virile engineer who becomes her lover. Ecstasy was filmed in three language versions – German, Czech, and French. It is perhaps the first non-pornographic movie to portray sexual intercourse and the female orgasm, although never showing more than the actors' faces.

== Plot ==
Emil, a fastidious and orderly older man, carries his happy new bride, Eva, over the threshold of their home. He has great difficulty opening the lock on the front door, trying key after key. She is greatly disappointed on their wedding night because he does not even come to bed. He has pinched his finger in the clasp of Eva's pearls when he attempts to remove them. He is unable to consummate their marriage due to the minor injury on his finger. Emil continues to ignore Eva for many days often retreating behind his newspaper. Eva refuses to live in a loveless marriage. She can no longer bear to be Emil's wife in name only and returns to the estate of her father, a wealthy horse breeder. Eva seeks and is granted a divorce from Emil.

One day, Eva goes horseback riding in the countryside surrounding her father's estate. She has a swim in the nude, leaving her clothes on her horse, which wanders off to find a stallion locked in a nearby corral. Eva, still completely naked, chases after her horse. Adam, a virile, young engineer working in road construction in that area, happens to look up and see Eva trying to catch her horse. Finally, Adam is able to catch the runaway horse. Eva is so embarrassed that she hides in the bushes when Adam approaches her. At first, Eva is ashamed of her nudity, but then she glares up at him in defiance. He hands Eva her clothes. When she tries to leave, she hurts her ankle. At first, she resists Adam's efforts to help, then acquiesces.

That night, Eva is restless and cannot stop thinking about Adam. Finally, she goes to his isolated residence, which is located near the field where they met. After some hesitation, they embrace and spend the night together. In the throes of passion, Eva's pearl necklace is broken and falls to the floor. She forgets to take it with her the next morning but the young lovers promise to meet in town at the local hotel the following evening.

When Eva returns home the next morning, she finds an unwelcome visitor. Her ex-husband, Emil, has been waiting for her all night. He wants to reconcile with her, but she tells him that it is too late. Brokenhearted, he leaves.

By chance, while driving away, Emil encounters Adam on the road and Adam asks for a ride into town. Emil agrees. They stop at Adam's residence in order to pack his suitcase. While packing, Adam notices Eva's pearls on the floor. He takes them along intending to return them to her. While traveling to town, Emil notices Adam admiring the pearl necklace and instantly recognizes it as that belonging to his ex-wife. Emil becomes jealous and enraged. Adam has no idea that Emil had been married to Eva. In his anger, Emil considers driving into an approaching train at a crossing, but at the last moment thinks better of it.

That night, Emil sits alone in a hotel room while a fly tries futilely to get out through a closed window and several others are shown trapped in flypaper. Meanwhile, downstairs, Adam is arranging flowers as he waits in the hotel restaurant for his lover, Eva, to arrive. The young lovers are very happy to be reunited. While they are drinking champagne and dancing, they suddenly hear a gunshot. Emil has shot himself. Everyone in the hotel runs to the door of Emil's room. Adam still does not know of the connection between Emil and Eva. She is deeply saddened by the suicide of Emil. However, she does not divulge her relationship with Emil to anyone, including Adam.

The young couple were to take the train to Berlin later that evening and begin their new life together. While waiting at the train station, Adam falls asleep. A distraught Eva slips quietly away while Adam sleeps and leaves on a different train. Later, he returns to his work in construction and daydreams of Eva, imagining her happily holding his baby.

== Cast ==
- Hedy Lamarr as Eva Jermann (credit as Hedy Kiesler)
- Aribert Mog as Adam
- Zvonimir Rogoz as Emil Jermann
- Leopold Kramer as Eva's father
- Jiřina Steimarová as Typist Madla
- Antonín Kubový as Vagrant
- Karel Mácha-Kuča as Lawyer
- Eduard Šlégl as Vagrant
- Jan Sviták as Dancer on the terrace

Overdubs for Czech version:

- Jiřina Štěpničková as Eva
- Jiří Plachý as Adam
- Bedřich Vrbský as Eva's father

Overdubs for French version:

- Pierre Nay as Adam
- André Nox as Eva's father

== Production ==
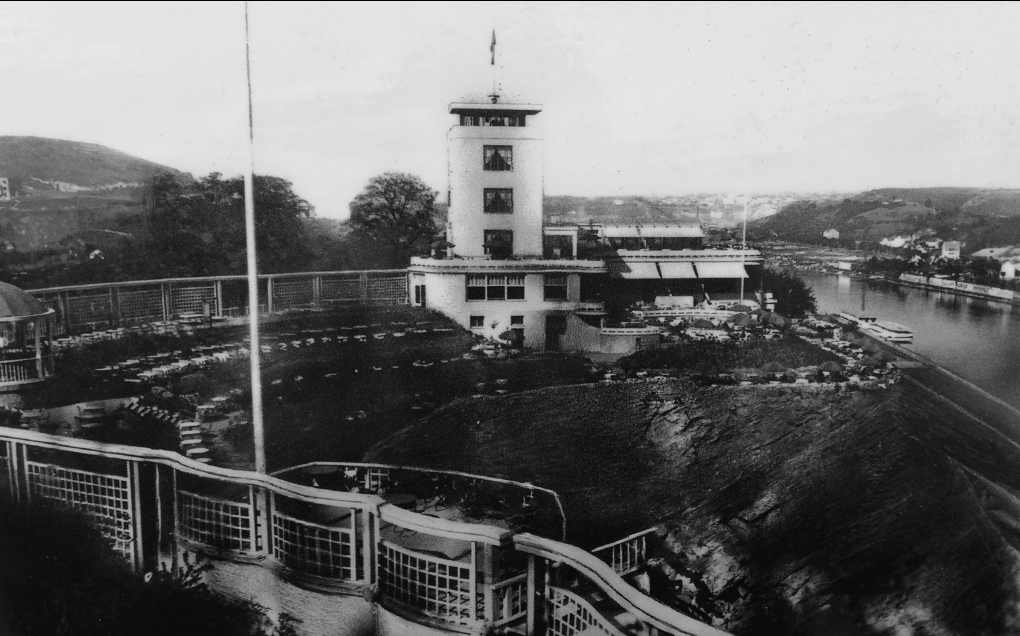
Barrandov Terraces, where the dancing scenes were shot

Ecstasy was filmed in the summer of 1932, with a German language script that contained only five pages. The original prepared script (two previous versions were cancelled) was in Czech, so Lamarr was useful in translating from German to French. After the shooting at Barrandov Terraces in Prague and a pond in Jevany, the crew moved to Dobšiná, Slovakia on 5 July 1932, to shoot the rest of the outdoor scenes.

It was not until August that shooting really started, mostly because of disputes about the French version and French actors. From Dobšiná, short shooting trips of one or two days were made to other places: Topoľčianky (scenes with horses), Khust, Carpathian Ruthenia, and railroad construction Červená skala – Margecany. The film was not finished in time, and A-B ateliery in Prague was already booked out in September, so some indoor scenes were filmed over six days in the Atelier Schönbrunn studios in Vienna, Austria, which was commercially useful because the producer did not have to pay the import (contingency) fee when showing the film in Austria. By that time the distribution rights had already been sold in Germany, Austria, Hungary, Switzerland, Belgium, France, Argentina, Brazil, Colombia, and other countries.

== Release ==
The world premiere of the film took place on 20 January 1933 in Prague, Czechoslovakia. In Austria, the film was released on 14 February 1933. Due to censorship problems, German cinemas did not show it until 8 January 1935, with the title Symphonie der Liebe (Symphony of Love).

=== Controversy ===
Ecstasy was controversial in some countries because of the film's nudity and the orgasm scene. Lamarr later claimed in interviews she was tricked into the nude scenes by the director and there was no mention of the nude scenes in the script.

"When Lamarr applied for the role, she had little experience nor understood the planned filming. Anxious for the job, she signed the contract without reading it. When, during an outdoor scene, the director told her to disrobe, she protested and threatened to quit, but he said that if she refused, she would have to pay for the cost of all the scenes already filmed. To calm her, he said they were using ‘long shots’ in any case, and no intimate details would be visible. At the preview in Prague, sitting next to the director, when she saw the numerous close-ups produced with telephoto lenses, she screamed at him for tricking her."

However, other people involved in the movie disputed this. Lupita Tovar was offered the role of Eva, but after her husband Paul Kohner saw the script, which made it clear that nudity was expected, he insisted she not take the role. A similar story was told by Adina Mandlová, who was forbidden to accept the role by her then-boyfriend Hugo Haas. Cinematographer Jan Stallich said of Lamarr: "As the star of the picture she knew she would have to appear naked in some scenes. She never made any fuss about it during the production."

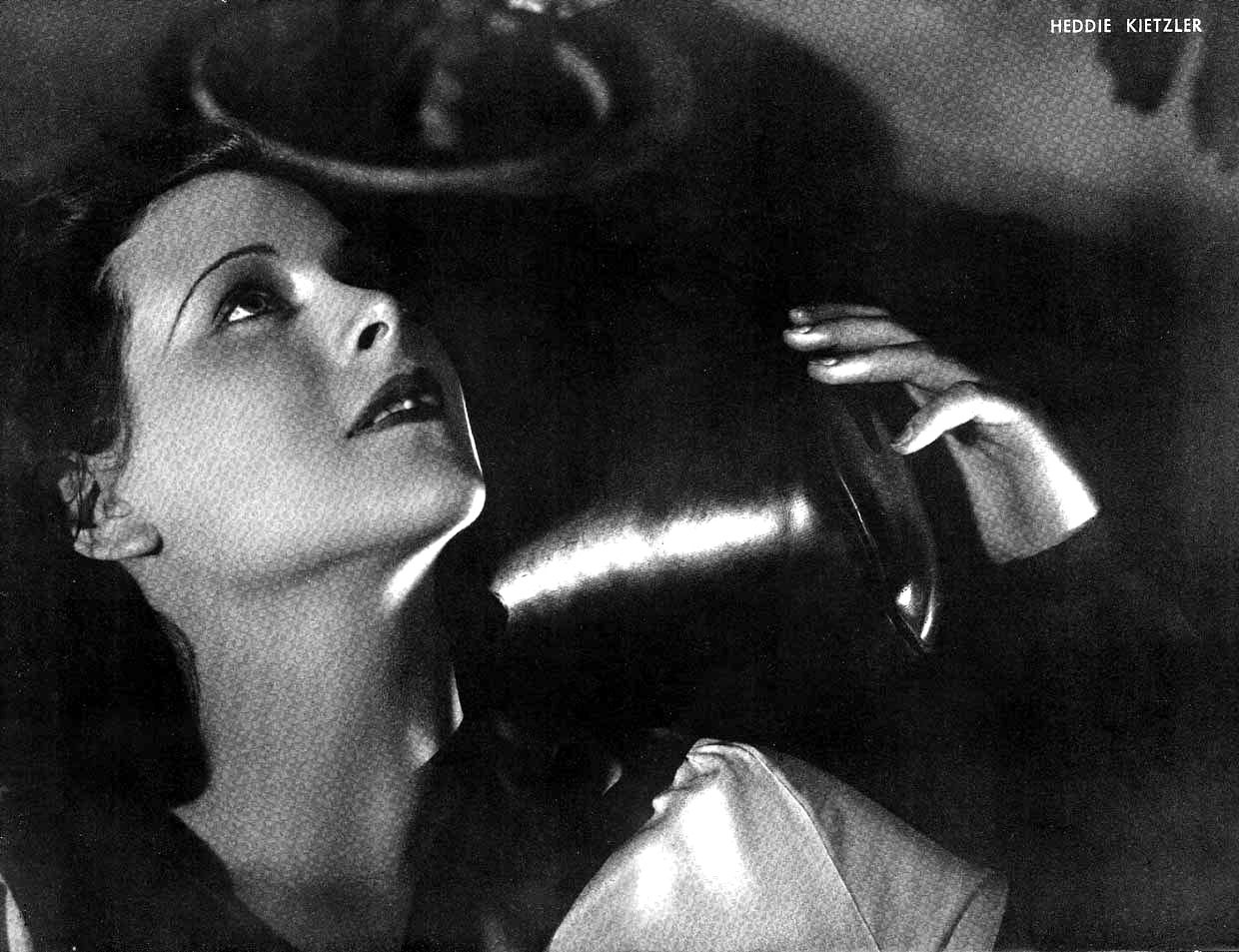
Hedy Lamarr in 1934

After a Vatican journalist attended screening at Venice Film Festival, Pope Pius XI denounced the film in the Vatican newspaper. As a result, none of the Italian distributors bought the rights for distribution. In Germany, the film was banned and only released in 1935 with edited scenes. In the United States, the Catholic Legion of Decency found the film morally objectionable. It condemned the film in 1933, making Ecstasy one of the first foreign films condemned by the Legion.

Beginning in 1936, the US distributor of Ecstasy lobbied the Hays office for ten months to get the film the Hays Code seal of approval which would allow it a wide American release. Joseph Breen called the picture "highly – even dangerously – indecent" in an inter-office memo to Will H. Hays, and told the producers:

I regret to have to advise you that we cannot approve your production Ecstasy that you submitted for our examination yesterday for the reason that is our considered unanimous judgment that the picture is definitely and specifically in violation of the Production Code. This violation is suggested by the basic story... in that it is a [story] of illicit love and frustrated sex, treated in detail without sufficient compensating moral values...

Breen later hired Machatý at RKO in 1940.

Ecstasy was not released in the United States until 1935. It went on to limited run in America without the Hays seal, where it played in mostly independent art houses. Some state censor boards such as New York approved the film but most others either only allowed it with restrictions, demanded substantial cuts, or in the case of Pennsylvania, banned it altogether.

Lamarr's first husband, the wealthy arms dealer Friedrich Mandl, reportedly spent $280,000 ($5.37 million in 2024 dollars) in an unsuccessful attempt to suppress the film by purchasing every existing print.

== Versions ==
Austrian and Czech versions of the film were very similar. Only the scenes with supporting actors differed. The roles of Eva, Adam and Eva's father were overdubbed by Czech actors for the Czech version. Zvonimir Rogoz replayed all of his dialog in Czech. The French version featured actors André Nox as Eva's father and Pierre Nay as Adam.

Machatý anticipated problems with censors, so he shot alternative scenes, that could be edited in the movie. The original versions were screened in Czechoslovakia, Austria and Venice Film Festival. In Germany censors allowed the film only after some of the nude shots were removed and two additional scenes were added: one scene making it clear Eva was already divorced when she met Adam, and a more traditional ending where Eva and Adam stay together. This version was the basis for the US distribution version. The US version also added songs by Denes Agay and Emery H. Helm with lyrics by Henry Gershwin and William Colligan.
