= Falešná kočička aneb Když si žena umíní =

1926 film

- Directed by: Svatopluk Innemann
- Written by: Josef Skružný; Elmar Klos; Vladimír Slavínský
- Starring: Vlasta Burian
- Cinematography: Otto Heller
- Edited by: Antonín Zelenka
- Release date: 24 September 1926
- Country: Czechoslovakia
- Language: Silent

Falešná kočička aneb Když si žena umíní is a Czech silent comedy film directed by Svatopluk Innemann. It was released in 1926.

== Cast ==
- Vlasta Burian - Vendelín Pleticha
- Karel Hašler - Dr. Karel Verner
- Jiří Dréman - Janota
- Zdena Kavková - Milca Janotová
- Antonie Nedošinská - Amálka Holubová
- Jára Sedláček - Mr. Chládek
- Svatopluk Innemann - Teacher
- Milka Bálek-Brodská - Verner's Assistant
- Marie Kalmarová - Mannequin
- Ladislav H. Struna - Apache
- Anna Buriánová - Milca's Friend
- Filip Bálek-Brodsksý - Patient
- Eduard Simácek - Patient
- Josef Oliak - Patient
- Ada Velický - Patient
- Jaroslav Marvan - Policeman
