= Černé oči, proč pláčete...? =

1930 film

- Directed by: Leo Marten
- Written by: Leo Marten (writer), Karel Spelina (story)
- Release date: 28 March 1930
- Country: Czechoslovakia
- Language: Czech

Černé oči, proč pláčete...? is a 1930 Czechoslovak comedy film directed by Leo Marten.

== Cast ==
- Frank Argus
- Milka Balek-Brodská
- Filip Balek-Brodský
- Sasa Dobrovolná ... Anna Novotna
- Eman Fiala
- Ludmila Folprechtova
- Antonín Fric
- Jaro Hykman ... Marcel Novotny
- Mary Jansová
- Mario Karas
- Jindrich Lhoták ... Jarsky
- Václav Pecián
- Karel Schleichert
- Ferry Seidl
- Čeněk Šlégl ... Maj. von Rohrerich
- Eduard Slégl
- Jan W. Speerger ... Pavel Cermak
- Otto Zahrádka ... Trnka
