= Le Golem =

- French film poster
- Directed by: Julien Duvivier
- Written by: André-Paul Antoine; Julien Duvivier
- Story by: Jiří Voskovec (uncredited); Jan Werich (uncredited)
- Produced by: Charles Philip
- Starring: Harry Baur; Roger Karl; Ferdinand Hart
- Cinematography: Jan Stallich; Václav Vích
- Edited by: Jiří Slavíček
- Music by: Josef Kumok
- Production company: A-B
- Distributed by: A-B; Les Artistes Associés
- Release date: 14 February 1936
- Running time: 95 minutes
- Country: Czechoslovakia
- Language: French

Le Golem (Czech: Golem) is a 1936 Czechoslovak monster movie directed by Julien Duvivier in French language.

== Plot ==
In a Prague ghetto, poor Jews find themselves oppressed by Rudolf II, Holy Roman Emperor (Harry Baur) which leads to talk among the Jews of re-awakening the Golem who is being held in an attic by Rabbi Jacob (Charles Dorat). During a food riot, Rudolph's mistress, the Countess Strada (Germaine Aussey), is rescued by the enamored De Trignac (Roger Cuchesne), who gets hurt in the process. De Trignac is taken to Rabbi Jacob's house by his wife Rachel (Jany Holt). When Rudolph gets engaged to his cousin Isabel of Spain, it angers Strada who charms De Trignac to steal Jacob's Golem.

Friedrich (Gaston Jacquest), the prefect of the police informs Rudolph of the Golem's disappearance. Rabbi Jacob is brought into the palace by Rudolph and told if any Jews are found in relation with the Golem's disappearance, then they will be hung. Rachel seeks De Trignac to aid Jacob’s escape from the castle. De Trignac offers what he claims to be Charlemagne's sword for Jacob's release. After Jacob and De Trignac leave, Rudolph wanders his palace where he meets up with the Golem. After a failed polite gesture to the statue, Rudolph attacks it with his sword and has it chained to the walls of his dungeon. Rudolph then demands all Jewish leaders be imprisoned and executed, including Jacob. Rachel had learned previously from her Jacob that when a beast roars the Golem will awake. As people enter the palace to honour Rudolph, Rachel gets the lions near the Golem's cell to roar. Rachel carves the Hebrew word "emet", meaning “truth” on the Golem's forehead which brings the creature to life.

The Golem snaps his chains and causes panic through the palace along with the released lions. Chancellor Lang, Friedrich and many other of Rudolph's other advisors are attacked and killed by the Golem while Rudolph escapes the palace. Jacob erases the first Hebrew letter on the Golem's head (which now spells "dead") making the Golem disintegrate while Rudolph's benevolent brother Mathias approaches Prague.

== Production ==
The original screenplay was written by Jiří Voskovec and Jan Werich based on their play Golem. Duvivier turned down their script, wrote his own screenplay, but kept parts of the original in, for which he was successfully sued by Voskovec and Werich. The film was shot at Barrandov Studios in Prague.

== Cast ==
- Harry Baur – Rudolph II
- Roger Karl – Chancellor Lang
- Ferdinand Hart – Golem
- Charles Dorat – Rabbi Jacob
- Germaine Aussey – Countess Catherine Strada
- Jany Holt – Rachel
- Truda Grosslichtová – Madame Benoitová
- Roger Duchense – Trignac
- Gaston Jacquet – Friedrich
- Raymond Aimos – Toussaint
- Stanislav Neumann – Daniel
- Karel Schleichert – Alchemyst

== Release ==
The French premiere was in Le Paris cinema at Champs Elysées, Paris. The movie is a sequel to Paul Wegener's 1920 film The Golem: How He Came into the World. The film opened in Britain in 1937 with a running time that was cut to 83 minutes. It was then reissued the next year under the title The Legend of Prague with a running time of 70 minutes. In the late 1940s, Sterling Films released an 8mm and 16mm home movie edition in the US, under the title The Man Of Stone. This ten-minute short subject was possibly the first 'horror' film on the home movie market, pre-dating Castle Films' monster movies by over a decade.

== Reception ==
Writing for The Spectator in 1937, Graham Greene gave the film a mildly good review, noting that the "acceptance of the most fantastic situations" lent the film "a curious, almost Surrealist" quality, but that Baur's performance as the Emperor had been "one of his most brilliant performances", and that ultimately the film was "quite worth seeing as a kind of survival - a Semitic survival - of the old, romantic Caligari cinema".

== See also ==
- Daimajin (fictional character created by Daiei Film, being inspired by Le Golem)
