= K. und K. Feldmarschall =

1930 film

- Directed by: Karel Lamač
- Starring: Vlasta Burian
- Release date: 1930
- Country: Czechoslovakia
- Language: German

K. und K. Feldmarschall (aka Der falsche Feldmarschall) is a comedy film from Czechoslovakia, released in 1930.

It is the German-language version of Imperial and Royal Field Marshal (1930). There is also a French-language version Monsieur le maréchal (1931).
