= Grand Hotel Nevada =

1935 film

- Lída Baarová and Otomar Korbelář
- Directed by: Jan Sviták
- Written by: František Langer (play); Bohumil Štěpánek; Bedřich Šulc; Bedřich Wermuth; Hans Winter
- Starring: Lída Baarová; Otomar Korbelář; Karel Dostal
- Cinematography: Václav Vích
- Edited by: Jiří Slavíček
- Music by: Joseph Kumok
- Production company: UFA
- Release date: 18 January 1935
- Running time: 95 minutes
- Country: Germany
- Language: Czech

Grand Hotel Nevada (Czech: Grandhotel Nevada) is a 1935 comedy film directed by Jan Sviták and starring Lída Baarová, Otomar Korbelář, and Karel Dostal.

It was made in Prague by the Czech subsidiary of the Germany company UFA. The film's sets were designed by the art director Štěpán Kopecký.

== Cast ==
- Lída Baarová as Lucy Whiteman
- Otomar Korbelář as Petr
- Karel Dostal as Black
- Julius Baťha as Nurse
- Jaroslav Bráška as Patient
- Jaroslav Budil as Nurse
- Bedřich Frankl as Patient
- Zdeněk Gina Hašler as Nurse
- Jožka Lopej as Popelka
- Jaroslav Marvan as Prof. Cogan
- František Paul as Fiala
- Theodor Pištěk as Filip
- Karel Sott
- Jan W. Speerger as Hrdina
- Božena Svobodová as Patient

== Bibliography ==
- Hales, Barbara; Petrescu, Mihaela; Weinstein, Valerie (2016). Continuity and Crisis in German Cinema, 1928–1936. Rochester, NY: Camden House. ISBN 978-1-57113-935-1.
