= The Ideal Schoolmaster =

1932 film

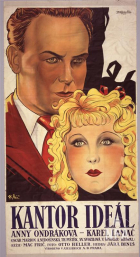
- Film poster
- Directed by: Martin Frič
- Written by: Václav Wasserman; Adéla Cervená; Martin Frič
- Produced by: Vladimír Kabelík
- Starring: Karel Lamač
- Cinematography: Otto Heller
- Edited by: Karel Lamač
- Release date: 1932
- Running time: 85 minutes
- Country: Czechoslovakia
- Language: Czech

The Ideal Schoolmaster (Czech: Kantor Ideál) is a 1932 Czech comedy film directed by Martin Frič.

== Cast ==
- Karel Lamač as Professor Karel Suchý
- Anny Ondra as Vera Matysová
- Oscar Marion as Rudolf Junek
- Theodor Pištěk as the school director
- Svetla Svozilová as Dr. Plásilová
- Antonie Nedošinská as Vera's aunt
- Valentin Sindler as Jecmínek, the janitor
- Čeněk Šlégl as Karel Domin
- Jaroslav Marvan as Suchého spoluzák
- Karel Postranecký as Friend
- Ladislav Hemmer as Friend
