= Public Not Admitted =

1933 film

- Directed by: Martin Frič
- Written by: Václav Wasserman
- Starring: Karel Lamač
- Cinematography: Karl Degl; Otto Heller
- Release date: 1933
- Running time: 93 minutes
- Country: Czechoslovakia
- Language: Czech

Public Not Admitted (Czech: S vyloučením veřejnosti) is a 1933 Czech comedy film directed by Martin Frič.

== Cast ==
- Karel Lamač as JUDr. Anatol Brynda
- Truda Grosslichtová as Slávka Smídová
- Čeněk Šlégl as Jára Marek
- Ljuba Hermanová as Helena Králová (as Ljuba Herrmannová)
- Theodor Pištěk as Slávka's father
- Milada Gampeová as Slávka's mother
- Ella Nollová as Porter's wife
- Antonín Kandert as Attorney
- Josef Rovenský as Safe-cracker
- Jaroslav Marvan as Director
- Otto Heller as Cameraman
- Jan S. Kolár as Magistrate
- Milka Balek-Brodská as Scandalmonger
- Ferdinand Jarkovský as Blind man
- Rudolf Stahl as Assistant director
