= Václav Vích =

Czech cinematographer

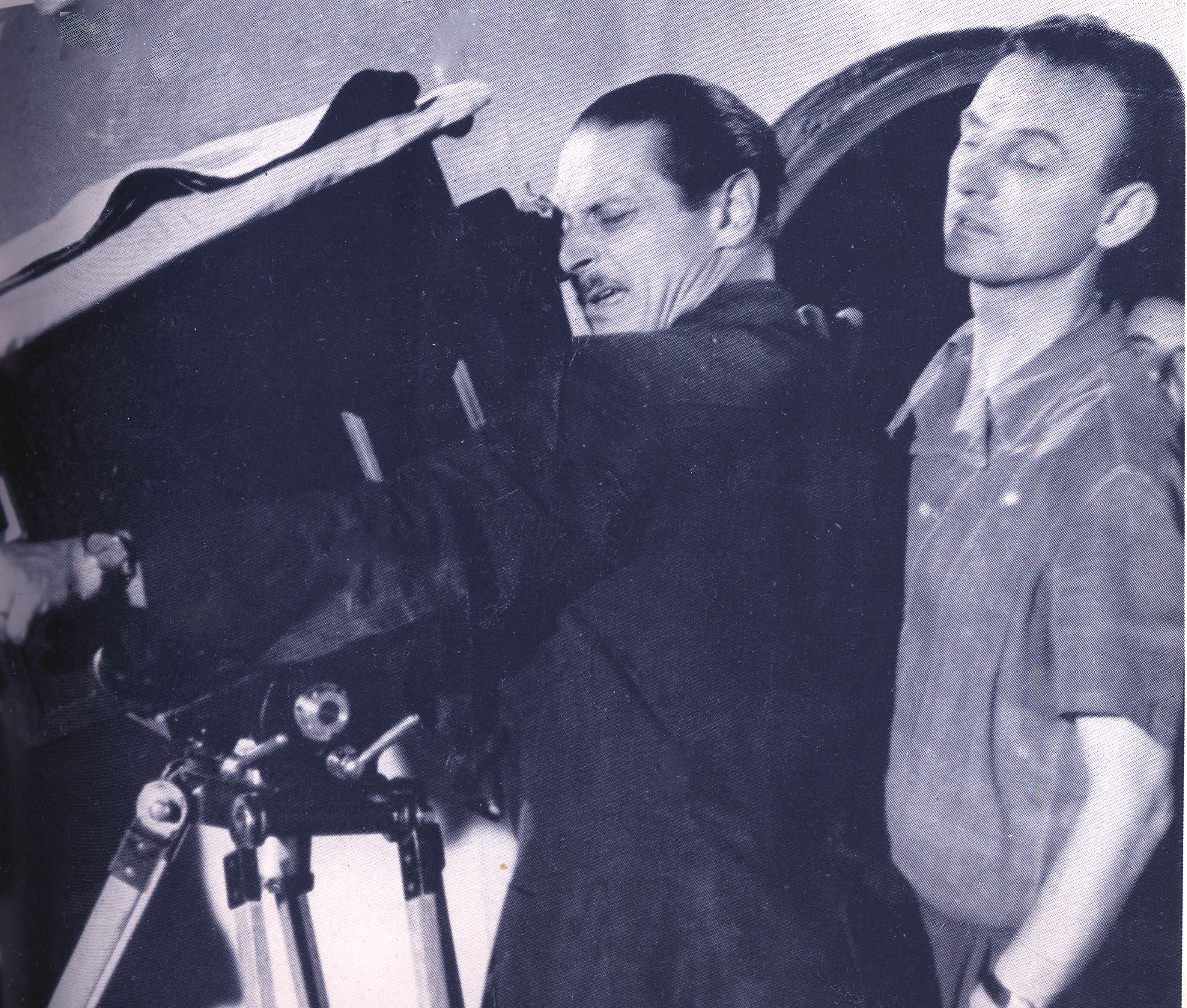
- Alessandro Blasetti and Vích on set
- Born: 18 January 1898; Karlsbad, Bohemia; Austro-Hungarian Empire
- Died: 14 September 1966 (aged 68); Rome, Lazio; Italy
- Occupation: Cinematographer
- Years active: 1923 – 1962

Václav Vích (18 January 1898 – 14 September 1966) was a Czech cinematographer, who worked on over a hundred films in different countries during his career. In the 1930s, Vích was one of the top technicians in the Italian film industry. He often worked with the director Max Neufeld.

== Selected filmography ==
- The Kidnapping of Fux the Banker (1923)
- A Double Life (1924)
- The May Fairy (1926)
- Erotikon (1929)
- Call of the Blood (1929)
- St. Wenceslas (1930)
- Když struny lkají (1930)
- The Affair of Colonel Redl (1931)
- The Case of Colonel Redl (1931)
- Muži v offsidu (1931)
- The Ruined Shopkeeper (1933)
- The Happiness of Grinzing (1933)
- Volga in Flames (1934)
- The Little Pet (1934)
- Grand Hotel Nevada (1935)
- Le Golem (1936)
- Shipwrecked Max (1936)
- Cavalry (1936)
- The Castiglioni Brothers, (1937)
- It Was I! (1937)
- Queen of the Scala (1937)
- The Black Corsair (1937)
- Ettore Fieramosca (1938)
- The Count of Brechard (1938)
- Tonight at Eleven (1938)
- The Castle Ball (1939)
- Backstage (1939)
- Unjustified Absence (1939)
- The Sinner (1940)
- First Love (1941)
- Lucky Night (1941)
- The Secret Lover (1941)
- Luisa Sanfelice (1942)
- Mist on the Sea (1944)
- No Turning Back (1945)
- Eugenia Grandet (1945)
- We Are Not Married (1946)
- Be Seeing You, Father (1948)
- The Legend of Faust (1949)
- The Lost One (1951)
- The Sinner (1951)
- Miracles Still Happen (1951)
- Nights on the Road (1952)
- Illusion in a Minor Key (1952)
- The Mad Bomberg (1957)
- Der schönste Tag meines Lebens (1957)
- Escape from Sahara (1958)
- Giuseppina (1960): filmed 1959
- Romance in Venice (1962)

== Bibliography ==
- Gundle, Stephen. Mussolini's Dream Factory: Film Stardom in Fascist Italy. Berghahn Books, 2013.
- Bartošek, Lukáš (1984). Muži za kamerou (in Czech). Prague: Československý filmový ústav.
