= Karel Hašler =

Czech songwriter and actor (1879 –1941)

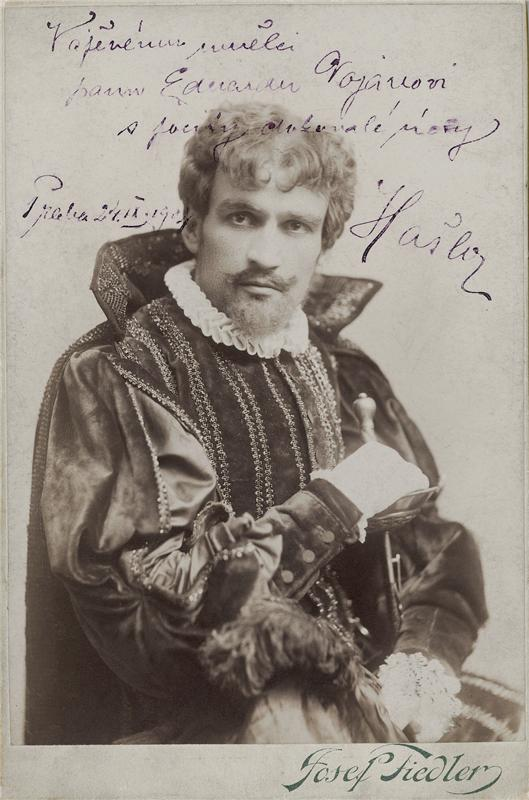
- Karel Hašler in one of his roles at the National Theatre, Prague, around 1904.
- Born: 31 October 1879; Prague, Kingdom of Bohemia, Austria-Hungary
- Died: 22 December 1941 (aged 62); Mauthausen, Nazi Germany
- Occupations: Actor songwriter Film director writer dramatist screenwriter

Karel Hašler (31 October 1879 – 22 December 1941) was a Czech songwriter, actor, lyricist, film and theatre director, composer, writer, dramatist, screenwriter and cabaretier. He was murdered in the Mauthausen concentration camp.

== Biography ==
Hašler studied to be a glove-maker, but he became intererested in theatre at a young age and occasionally performed with amateur theatre ensembles. In 1897, following his debut at the Aréna Theatre he left home and successively joined various travelling theatre companies. In 1902 he became a member of the Slovenian theatre in Ljubljana, but soon moved back to Prague, where he joined the National Theatre ensemble. In the National Theatre, he asserted himself in conversational plays. In addition to that, he also attempted to apply his singing abilities. Around 1908, he started composing his own music, and at the same time he began to incline to cabaret activities. Gradually he became a director and head of various Prague cabarets, such as Lucerna (1910–1915, 1918–1923), Rokoko (1915–1918) and Karlín Variety Theatre (1924–1929). In 1908, he married a sister of pianist and composer Rudolf Friml.

During World War I he also began to appear in silent films, as an actor, director and author. In 1914, he made a comedy České hrady a zámky (Czech Castles), based on his own script. The film was intended as an introduction for the play Pán bez kvartýru (A Man Without Flat). He appeared also in the comedy Ahasver and in other silent films.

"If our songs perish,

We'd lose all we cherish;

Living would then be in vain."

Ta naše písnička česká, end of the third stanza, English translation published in Chicago, 1934.

Among his most successful film roles were the lawyer and deputy Uher in the drama film Batalion (The Battalion, 1927) by Přemysl Pražský, and the organist in Varhaník u sv. Víta (Organist at St. Vitus Cathedral, 1929) by Martin Frič. The coming era of the sound film in 1930s enabled Hašler to utilize his singing skills. In his first sound film role Písničkář (Balladeer, 1932) by Svatopluk Innemann he sang patriotic songs Svoboda (Freedom) and Ta naše písnička česká (Our Czech song), among others. In 1942, in his last film role, he played himself in Za tichých nocí (In the Quiet Nights), made by his son Gina Hašler. From 1932 to 1941 Hašler played in more than 13 films. In September 1941, during production of the film Městečko na dlani, based on the script by Jan Drda, he was arrested by the Gestapo and sent to the Mauthausen concentration camp. The main reason for his arrest was his patriotic songs. On 22 December 1941 the Germans poured water on him and left him outside in the December frost to get frozen like an ice sculpture.

In the post-war Communist Czechoslovakia he was officially ignored for political reasons, because many of his songs hailed Tomáš Masaryk and Czechoslovak Legionnaires and mocked interbellum communists, and also because he was an admirer of the founder of the National Fascist Community Radola Gajda, and ideologically was close to the interbellum Czech fascists.

== Remembrance ==
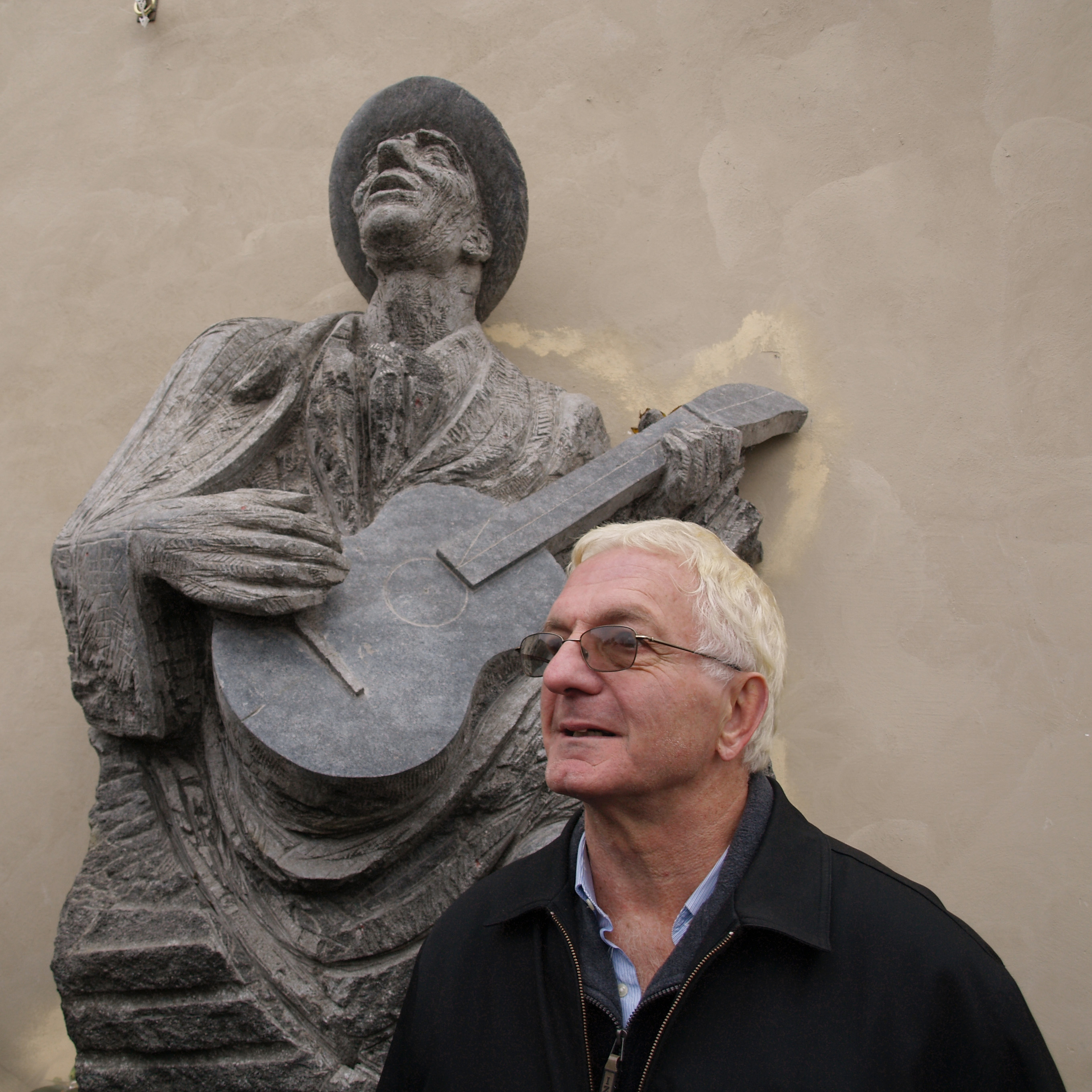
Thomas Hašler after the inauguration of the sculpture of his father "The Songster" by Czech sculptor Stanislav Hanzík Prague, 31 October 2009

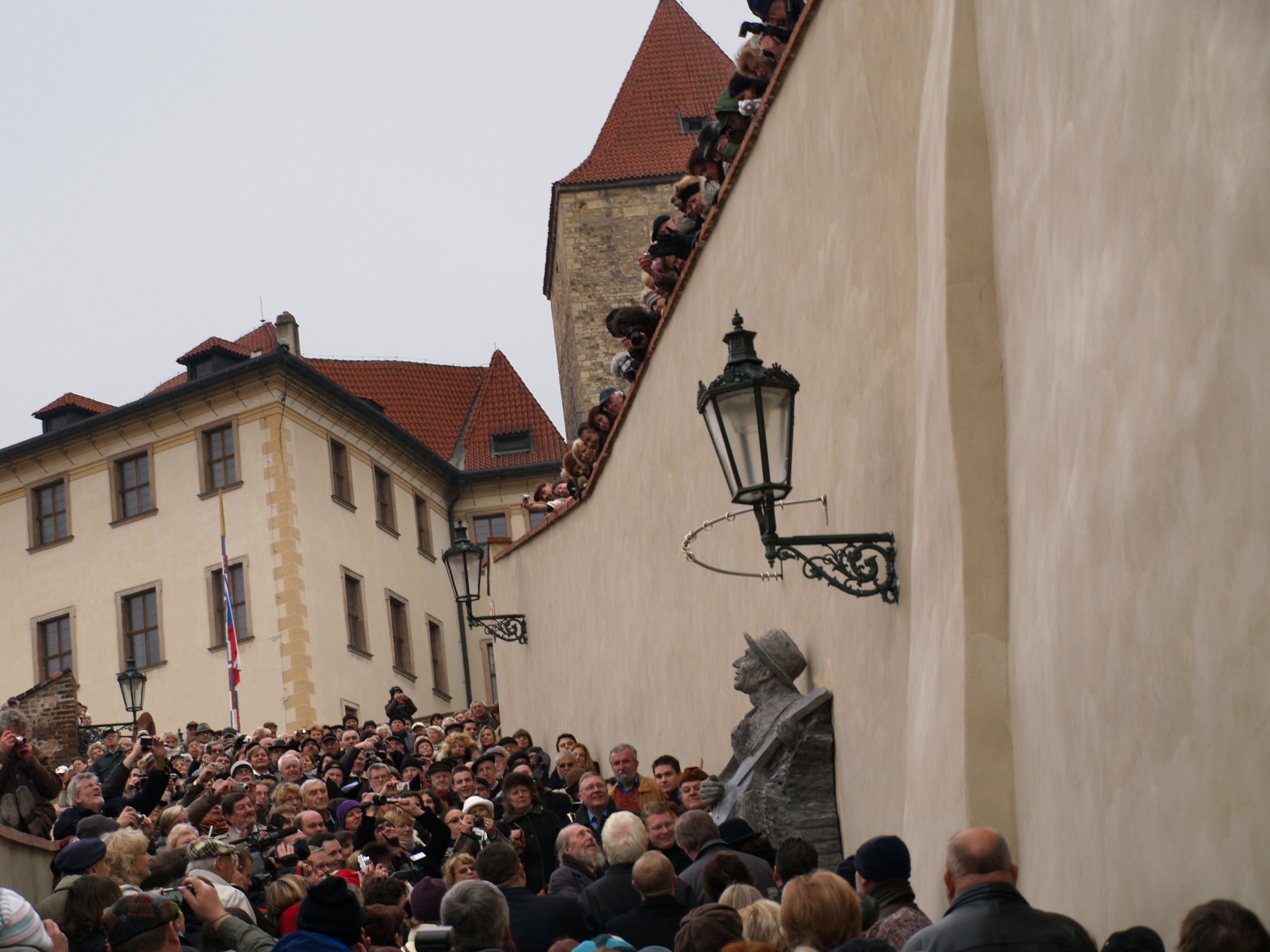
Prague celebrated the 130th anniversary of the birth of Karel Hašler with the unveiling of his monument on the Old Castle Steps below the Prague Castle on October 31, 2009

A popular Czech herbal-menthol hard candy was called Hašlerka after him. They have been known since early 1900s. Now the trademark is owned by Nestle.

"Hašlerky" is a recognizable type of songs, written by Hašler and of similar character.

Czech astronomer Lenka Kotková (née L. Šarounová) named asteroid 37939 Hašler after him.

In 2008, Czech directors Marek Jícha and Josef Lustig made a documentary Písničkář, který nezemřel (The Immortal Balladeer of Prague) describing the fate of Hašler's illegitimate son Thomas Hasler.

On the occasion of Hašler's 130th anniversary (2009) a monument by sculptor Stanislav Hanzík was unveiled at the Old Castle Steps.

In 2013 the band Patrola Šlapeto recorded a CD and DVD with 23 Hašler's songs based on original recordings found in musical archives. While there have been plenty recordings of Hasler's songs, this was the first in 80 years recording of the original tunes. Karel Hašlers artistic output consists mainly of songs. He created more than 300 compositions, many of which became popular "folk songs". With his engaged patriotic approach he helped to strengthen the national consciousness of Czech people during times of danger and oppression. Following his death in the concentration camp, his songs became a symbol of national resistance.

== Works ==
Selected songs

- Hoši od Zborova
- Kampak na nás, bolševíci? (1919)
- Po starých zámeckých schodech
- Pětatřicátníci
- Ta naše písnička česká
- Čí je Praha? Naše!
- Já mám holku od Odkolků
- Strahováček
- Podskalák

Actor:

- Pantáta Bezoušek (The Old Man Bezousek, 1941) – Councillor Burdych
- Roztomilý člověk (A Charming Man, 1941) – Editor-in-chief
- In the Still of the Night (1941) – Karel Hašler
- Jarní písnička (Spring Song, 1937) – Chodec
- Vzdušné torpédo 48 (Air Torpedo 48, 1936) – Dr Marvan
- Ať žije nebožtík (Long Live with Dearly Departed, 1935) – Petr Kornel
- Jedenácté přikázání (The Eleventh Commandment, 1935) – The Police Captain
- Král ulice (King of the Street, 1935) – Martin Antoni/Martin
- Za ranních červánků (1934) – Josef Dobrovský
- Srdce za písničku (A Heart for a Song, 1933) – Hugo Strindberg
- Záhada modrého pokoje (Mystery of a Blue Room, 1933) – Count Hellford
- Jindra, hraběnka Ostrovínová (Jindra, the Countess Ostrovín, 1933) – Musician Jahoda
- Písničkář (Balladeer, 1932) – Pavel Hala
- Do You Know That Little House on Lake Michigan? (1929) – Kennedy
- Adjunkt Vrba (Adjunct Vrba, 1929) – Maran
- Varhaník u sv. Víta (Organist at St. Vitus Cathedral, 1929) – Organist
- Batalion (Battalion, 1927) – JUDr. František Uher
- Falešná kočička (The Little False Cat, 1926) – MUDr. Karel Verner
- Cikán Jura (Gypsy Jura, 1922)
- Ahasver (1915) – Painter's Husband Valentin
- České hrady a zámky (Czech Castles and Palaces, 1914) .... Karel Hašler

Writer:

- Babička (Grandmother, 1940)
- Hordubalové (1938)
- Švanda dudák (1937) – screenplay
- Irčin románek (Irca's Romance, 1936) – screenplay
- Vojnarka (1936) – screenplay
- Vzdušné torpédo 48 (Air Torpedo 48, 1936)
- Jánošík (1935)
- Král ulice (King of Street, 1935) – screenplay
- Za ranních červánků (1934) – screenplay
- Záhada modrého pokoje (1933) – screenplay
- V tom domečku pod Emauzy (In the Little House Below Emausy, 1933)
- Písničkář (Balladeer, 1932) (screenplay)
- České hrady a zámky (Czech Castles and Palaces, 1914) – story

Composer:

- Venoušek a Stázička (1939)
- Neporažená armáda (Undefeated Army, 1938)
- Jana (1935)
- Jedenácté přikázání (The Eleventh Commandment, 1935)
- Král ulice (1935)
- Poslední muž (1934)
- Srdce za písničku (A Heart for a Song, 1933)
- U snědeného krámu (The Ruined Shopkeeper, 1933)
- Záhada modrého pokoje (1933)
- Písničkář (1932)

Music Department:

- Rote Rosen – blaue Adria (1938) – composer: song "Rote Rosen – Blaue Adria", "O du mein alter Stephansturm ..."
- Jarní písnička (Spring Song, 1937) – composer: song "Ta naše krásná zem je jako pohádka"
- Divoch (Wild Girl, 1936) – composer: song "Pod oblohou modré Adrie"
- Za ranních červánků (1934) – composer: song "Ty šumavské hory"
- Matka Kráčmerka (Mother Kracmerka, 1934) – composer: song "Valčík"
- Jindra, hrabenka Ostrovínová (Jindra, the Countess Ostrovín, 1933) – composer: song "My nikdy svoji nebudem"

Director:

- Irčin románek (Irca's Romance, 1936)
- Srdce za písničku (A Heart for a Song, 1933)
- České hrady a zámky (Czech Castles and Palaces, 1914)

Soundtrack:

- Za tichých nocí (In the Still of the Night, 1941) – music: "Po starých zámeckých schodech"

Producer:

- Jánošík (1935)
