= Imperial and Royal Field Marshal (1930 film) =

1930 Czechoslovak comedy film

- Directed by: Karel Lamač
- Written by: Václav Wasserman; Emil Artur Longen (play)
- Release date: 1930
- Running time: 91 minutes
- Country: Czechoslovakia
- Language: Czech

Imperial and Royal Field Marshal (Czech: C. a k. polní maršálek) is a 1930 Czechoslovak comedy film directed by Karel Lamač. It is considered to be the first ever Czech language sound film.

== Cast ==
- Vlasta Burian ... František Procházka, false Imperial and Royal Field Marshal
- Theodor Pištěk as Colonel Alois Přecechtěl
- Helena Monczáková as Přecechtělová, colonel's wife
- Máňa Ženíšková as Lili Přecechtělová, their daughter
- Jiří Hron as Lieutenant Rudi Eberle
- Jan W. Speerger as Military servant Sepll
- Čeněk Šlégl as Count Géza von Medák, Rittmeister
- Jindřich Plachta as Hofer, first lieutenant
- Josef Horánek as Real Imperial and Royal Field Marshal
- Olga Augustová as Singer
- Eman Fiala as Gustav Jannings, cabaret singer
- Otto Heller as Soldier
- Jaroslav Marvan as Maršálek's servant
- Josef Rovenský as Mayor
