= Truda Grosslichtová =

Czech actress

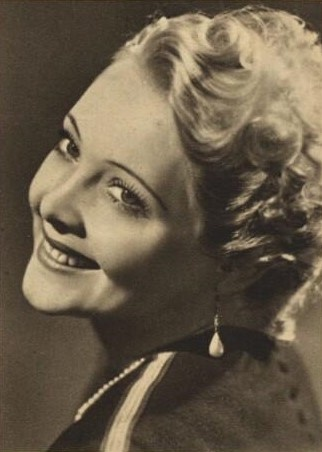
- Born: 23 February 1912; Prague, Austria-Hungary (now Czech Republic)
- Died: 8 June 1995 (aged 83); Nieuw Vennep, Netherlands
- Other names: Tania Doll, Trude de Vries
- Occupation: Actress
- Years active: 1931-1938

Truda Grosslichtová (23 February 1912 – 8 June 1995) was a Czechoslovak film actress.

== Life ==
Truda Grosslichtová was born Gertruda Marie Grosslichtová in Prague. She spoke Czech, German, French, English and Italian. She acted in amateur theatre, where she was noticed by a producer Josef Auerbach, who cast her both in Czech and German version of his film The Affair of Colonel Redl. She appeared in German and French movies under the name Tania Doll. In 1932 she was voted the most popular actress in Czechoslovakia by Film magazine. Through the 1930s she acted in many Prague theatres. During the war she was forced to work in a factory, because of her partial Jewish origin. In 1945 she married a Dutch soldier Hans de Vries and moved to Amsterdam.

== Selected filmography ==
- The Affair of Colonel Redl (1931)
- Scandal on Park Street (1932)
- The Inspector General (1933)
- Public Not Admitted (1933)
- Hrdina jedné noci (1935)
- The Eleventh Commandment (1935)
- Irca's Romance (1936)
- Le Golem (1936)
- Lawyer Vera (1937)
