= Jan Stallich =

Czech cinematographer

- Born: 19 March 1907; Prague, Bohemia, Austria-Hungary
- Died: 14 June 1973 (aged 66); Prague, Czechoslovakia
- Occupation: Cinematographer
- Years active: 1927–1968

Jan Stallich (19 March 1907 – 14 June 1973) was a Czech cinematographer. He worked in several European film industries including Great Britain, France, Germany, Italy and Spain as well as in his native country. He worked on over a hundred films during his career.

== Selected filmography ==
- St. Wenceslas (1929)
- Chudá holka (1929)
- Ecstasy (1933)
- The Mystery of the Blue Room (1933)
- The Inspector General (1933)
- The River (1933)
- A Woman Who Knows What She Wants (1934)
- Hero for a Night (1935)
- Le Golem (1935)
- The Silent Passenger (1935)
- Lonely Road (1936)
- Everything in Life (1936)
- Whom the Gods Love (1936)
- Guilty Melody (1936)
- Three Maxims (1936)
- Moonlight Sonata (1937)
- The Show Goes On (1937)
- Who's Your Lady Friend? (1937)
- The Fornaretto of Venice (1939)
- Saint Rogelia (1940)
- Abandonment (1940)
- Captain Fracasse (1940)
- The Daughter of the Green Pirate (1940)
- The Sin of Rogelia Sanchez (1940)
- The Siege of the Alcazar (1940)
- The Mask of Cesare Borgia (1941)
- Caravaggio (1941)
- The Mask of Cesare Borgia (1941)
- Vienna Blood (1942)
- Germanin (1943)
- Women Are No Angels (1943)
- Dog Days (1944)
- Viennese Girls (1945)
- Temno (1950)
- The Emperor and the Golem (1952)
- Dovolená s Andělem (1952)
- The Secret of Blood (1953)
- The Secret of the Chinese Carnation (1964)
- Massacre at Marble City (1964)
- People on Wheels (1966)
- Ski Fever (1966)

== Bibliography ==
- Hames, Peter. Czech and Slovak Cinema: Theme and Tradition. Edinburgh University Press, 2009.
