= Theodor Pištěk (actor) =

Czech actor

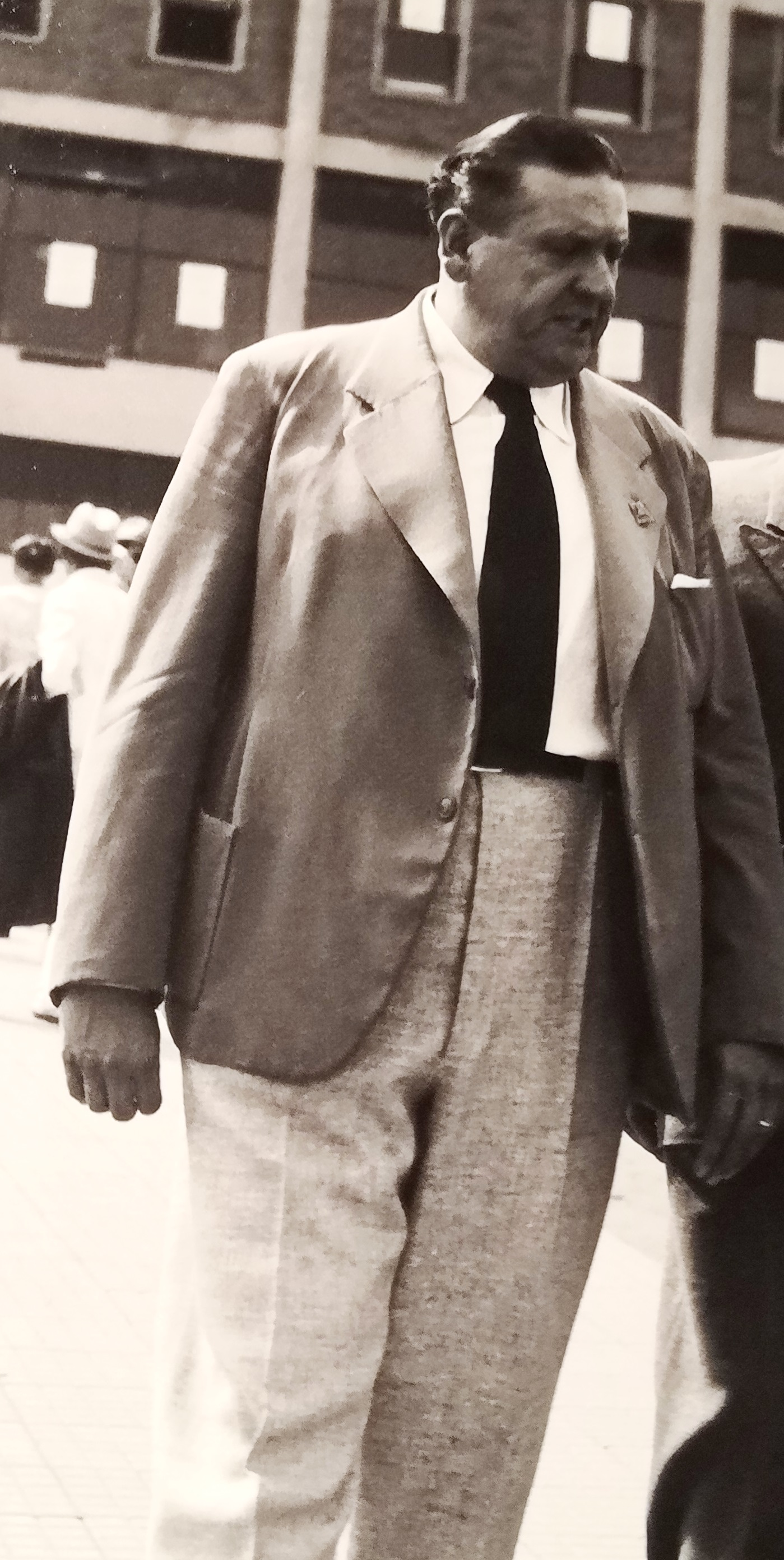
- Theodor Pištěk in 1941
- Born: 13 June 1895; Prague, Bohemia, Austria-Hungary
- Died: 5 August 1960 (aged 65); Mukařov, Czechoslovakia
- Occupation: Actor film director
- Years active: 1921–1959

Theodor Pištěk (13 June 1895 – 5 August 1960) was a Czech actor and film director. He appeared in more than 230 films between 1921 and 1959. He is the father of the painter and costume designer Theodor Pištěk.

== Selected filmography ==
- The Cross by the Brook (1921)
- Two Mothers (1921)
- Jánošík (1921)
- Gypsies (1922)
- Modern Marriages (1924)
- The Lantern (1925)
- The Countess from Podskalí (1926)
- Never the Twain (1926)
- Suzy Saxophone (1928)
- Eve's Daughters (1928)
- Affair at the Grand Hotel (1929)
- Father Radetzky (1929)
- Such Is Life (1929)
- Street Acquaintances (1929)
- Ship of Girls (1929)
- Erotikon (1929)
- Imperial and Royal Field Marshal (1930)
- Him and His Sister (1931)
- Muži v offsidu (1931)
- Sister Angelika (1932)
- Anton Spelec, Sharp-Shooter (1932)
- The Undertaker (1932)
- The Ideal Schoolmaster (1932)
- Life Is a Dog (1933)
- In the Little House Below Emauzy (1933)
- Public Not Admitted (1933)
- The Inspector General (1933)
- Hrdinný kapitán Korkorán (1934)
- The Eleventh Commandment (1935)
- Jánošík (1935)
- Grand Hotel Nevada (1935)
- Three Men in the Snow (1936)
- Paradise Road (1936)
- Irca's Romance (1936)
- The Seamstress (1936)
- Father Vojtech (1936)
- A Step into the Darkness (1937)
- Cause for Divorce (1937)
- Lawyer Vera (1937)
- Tři vejce do skla (1937)
- The Lantern (1938)
- Duchacek Will Fix It (1938)
- Škola základ života (1938)
- A Foolish Girl (1938)
- The Merry Wives (1938)
- The Catacombs (1940)
- Baron Prášil (1940)
- For a Friend (1940)
- May Fairy Tale (1940)
- Arthur and Leontine (1940)
- Auntie's Fantasies (1941)
- Jan Cimbura (1941)
- A Charming Man (1941)
- Valentin the Good (1942)
- Gabriela (1942)
- I'll Be Right Over (1942)
- Průlom (1946)
- Thunder in the Hills (1946)
- Čapek's Tales (1947)
- The Poacher's Foster Daughter or Noble Millionaire (1949)
- Anna Proletářka (1950)
- May Events (1951)
- Komedianti (1954)
- Leave It to Me (1955)
- The Princess with the Golden Star (1959)
