= List of Czech films of the 1920s =

A List of Czech films of the 1920s.

== Films by year ==
=== 1920 ===
Title	Director	Cast	Genre	Notes
Dráteníček				
Gilly poprvé v Praze				
Little Red Riding Hood	Svatopluk Innemann			
Magdalena				
Nikyho velebné dobrodružství				
Setřelé písmo				
Sněženky				
Tam na horách				
Za svobodu národa				
Zlatá žena				
Zpěv zlata				

=== 1921 ===
Title	Director	Cast	Genre	Notes
Cikáni				
Děti osudu				
Děvče ze Stříbrné Skalice				
Jánošík	Jaroslav Siakeľ	Theodor Pištěk, Mária Fábryová		
Kříž u potoka				
Mnichovo srdce				
Nad propastí				
Otrávené světlo				
Příchozí z temnot				
Roztržené foto				
Stíny				
Two Mothers/Dvě matky				
Živé mrtvoly				

=== 1922 ===
Title	Director	Cast	Genre	Notes
Adam a Eva				
The Bartered Bride				
Cikán Jura				
Drvoštěp				
Harémy kouzla zbavené				
Likérová princeznička				
The Mysterious Beauty	Premysl Prazský			
Noc tříkrálová				
O velkou cenu				
Proč se nesměješ				
Tulákovo srdce				
Venoušek a Stázička				

=== 1923 ===
Title	Director	Cast	Genre	Notes
Muž bez srdce				
Pepánek nezdara				
Problematický gentleman				
Tu ten kámen (a.k.a. Tu ten kámen aneb Kterak láskou možno v mžiku vzplanout třeba k nebožtíku)	Karl Anton	1. movie of Vlasta Burian, Anny Ondra, Eman Fiala, Ferenc Futurista	comedy	
Únos bankéře Fuxe				
Záhadný případ Galginův				

=== 1924 ===
Title	Director	Cast	Genre	Notes
Chyťte ho!				
A Double Life	Václav Kubásek	Jan W. Speerger	Drama	
Hříchy v manželství				
Kam s ním?				
White Paradise	Karel Lamač	Anny Ondra, Josef Rovenský	Drama	

=== 1925 ===
Title	Director	Cast	Genre	Notes
Do panského stavu				
The Eleventh Commandment	Václav Kubásek	Hugo Haas, Meda Valentová, Jirí Hron	Comedy	
From the Czech Mills				
Josef Kajetán Tyl				
Karel Havlíček Borovský				
Lucerna				
Okovy				
Šest mušketýrů				
Syn hor				
Tulák				
Vdavky Nanynky Kulichovy				
Vyznavači slunce				

=== 1926 ===
Title	Director	Cast	Genre	Notes
Bludné duše				
Falešná kočička aneb Když si žena umíní	Svatopluk Innemann	Karel Hašler, Zdena Kavková, Vlasta Burian, Antonie Nedošínská	comedy	
The Good Soldier Schweik				
Hraběnka z Podskalí	Carl Lamac	Theodor Pistek, Anny Ondra	Comedy	
The Kreutzer Sonata				
Lásky Kačenky Strnadové	Svatopluk Innemann	Zdena Kavková, Vlasta Burian, Jiří Sedláček	comedy	
Modche a Rézi				
Na letním bytě				
Never the Twain				
Otec Kondelík a ženich Vejvara I				
Otec Kondelík a ženich Vejvara II				
Pantáta Bezoušek				
Prach a oky				
Pražský flamendr				
Příběh jednoho dne				
Švejk v ruském zajetí				
Z lásky				

=== 1927 ===
Title	Director	Cast	Genre	Notes
Aničko, vrať se!				
Bahno Prahy				
Batalión				
Chorus Girls				
Dům ztraceného štěstí				
Květ ze Šumavy				
The Lovers of an Old Criminal	Svatopluk Innemann	4. movie of Vlasta Burian (enacting two characters), Anny Ondra	comedy	
Schweik in Civilian Life	Gustav Machatý	Karl Noll, Dina Gralla, Albert Paulig	Comedy	Co-production with Austria
Sextánka				
Sladká Josefínka				
V panském stavu				

=== 1928 ===
Title	Director	Cast	Genre	Notes
Eve's Daughters				
Hřích				
Kainovo znamení				
Mlynář a jeho dítě				
Modrý démant				
Podskalák				
V blouznění				
Ve dvou se to lépe táhne				
Zamilovaný vodník				
Životem vedla je láska				

=== 1929 ===
Title	Director	Cast	Genre	Notes
Boží mlýny	Josef Medeotti-Bohác			
Erotikon	Gustav Machatý	Ita Rina, Olaf Fjord, Charlotte Susa, Julius von Borsody, Karel Schleichert		
Hanka a Jindra	Oldrich Kmínek			
Hříchy lásky (Sin of a Beautiful Woman)	Karel Lamač			
Hrísná krev (Call of the Blood)	Victor Trivas	Jan Sviták		
The Last Testament (Das verschwundene Testamant)	Rolf Randolf			
The Monte Cristo of Prague (Der Monte Christo von Prag)	Hans Otto			
Páter Vojtěch (Father Vojtech)	Martin Frič	Josef Rovenský, Carl Lamac, Ladislav H. Struna, Suzanne Marwille, Karel Schleichert, Eman Fiala, Anna Opplová, Jindřich Plachta, Jaroslav Marvan, Eduard Slégl, Karel Nemec, Jan Richter, Fred Bulín, Josef Kobík, Karel Fiala		Frič's first film
Pražské švadlenky (Prague Seamstresses)	Přemysl Pražský			
Spring Awakening (Frühlings Erwachen)	Richard Oswald			
Such Is Life (Takový je život / So ist das Leben)	Carl Junghans	Vera Baranovskaya, Theodor Pištěk, Máňa Ženíšková, Valeska Gert		
Varhaník u sv. Víta (The Organist at St. Vitus' Cathedral)	Martin Frič	Karel Hašler		
Z českých mlýnů (From the Czech Mills)	Svatopluk Innemann			
