= The Poisoned Light =

1921 film directed by Jan S. Kolár

- Theatrical release poster
- Otrávené světlo
- Directed by: Jan S. Kolár; Karel Lamač
- Written by: Jan S. Kolár; Karel Lamač
- Starring: Karel Fiala; Anny Ondra; Karel Lamač
- Cinematography: Otto Heller
- Production company: Kalos
- Distributed by: American
- Release date: 21 October 1921
- Running time: 62 minutes
- Country: Czechoslovakia
- Language: Silent

The Poisoned Light (Czech: Otrávené světlo) is a 1921 Czechoslovak silent adventure film co-directed and co-written by Jan S. Kolár and Karel Lamač. It is the first Czech non-comedic crime film, although a review in Czech Film Newsreel (Český filmový zpravodaj) also noted certain parodic elements.

It was one of the first Czech films to achieve success in international distribution, alongside another work by Kolár, The Arrival from the Darkness (Příchozí z temnot) (1921), which premiered just a week earlier on 14 October 1921.

== Plot ==
Professor Oskar Grant has discovered a way to turn night into day. His invention, so-called "cold light", is considered highly dangerous; to prevent its misuse, Dr. Karel Selín, a representative of the World Association of Industrialists, purchases it. However, an illusionist named Durk is secretly present at their meeting. Shortly thereafter, Dr. Selín is found dead in his hotel, with a shattered light bulb serving as the only clue. A young engineer, Milan Bell, puts the police on the right track by revealing that the bulb was filled with a poisonous gas, making it a murder weapon. There is no trace of the perpetrators.

Meanwhile, Professor Grant is preparing for his daughter Anny's birthday party, to which Durk and his accomplices have been invited to perform an illusion act. During the performance, Durk manages to steal the blueprints for the invention and makes his escape. Engineer Bell, who makes no secret of his affection for Anny, joins the hunt for the criminals. Through a handprint, it is discovered that the illusionist Durk is actually an escaped convict named Jiří Darken, and that his simple-minded brother has been left in prison in his place.

Durk kidnaps Professor Grant to carry out his plans, but Bell and Anny are in pursuit. A lead takes them to an old house where the criminals are hiding. Bell confronts Durk, but is ultimately overpowered and tied up. In a small room, he is exposed to radiation from a bulb filled with a toxic gas. Anny tries in vain to get inside or cut off the electricity supply. In the end, he is saved by Durk's assistant, Karban, who refuses to continue working with Durk and instead leads the police to him. Durk is ultimately defeated, the plans for the invention are safe, and Bell and Anny are happily together.

== Cast ==
- Karel Fiala as Professor Oskar Grant
- Anny Ondra as Grant's daughter Anny
- Karel Lamač as Milan Bell
- Jindřich Lhoták as Karel Selín
- Emil Artur Longen as illusionist Durk/Durk's brother
- Jan S. Kolár as Ferdinand Karban
- Přemysl Pražský as Martin Bálek
- Antonín Marek as servant/Baron Evans Margus
- Josef Šváb-Malostranský as servant Jan

== Production ==
The film was produced under the banner of the company Kalos-film (Note: The company name is derived from the initials of the names Karel Lamač and Anna Ondráková (Karel – Anny – Lamač – Ondráková – Spol. Spol. means Co.).), founded by Alfred Baštýř, a supporter of Czech cinema, and was among the first works shot at the newly established A–B Vinohrady film studios.

The filmmakers drew inspiration from post-war foreign productions, incorporating Hollywood techniques and an action-orientated narrative style: the film features a rapid succession of events, lively characters, and a romantic subplot interwoven with the investigative storyline. The film's fast-paced nature was also shaped by an innovative use of cliffhangers, a necessity stemming from the fact that most Czech cinemas were equipped with only a single projector. By placing suspenseful scenes at the end of each film reel, the filmmakers kept the audience in suspense even during the intermission required to change the reels. Foreign influences are also evident in elements such as Longen's expressive acting style and the symbolism of a fateful, looming evil.

The film offers a textbook example of a "MacGuffin"—an object essential to the plot (serving to drive the action and characters forward) but otherwise of little intrinsic importance—long before the term was popularised by Alfred Hitchcock.

== Release ==
In 2018, the Czech Film Archive released a restored version of the films The Poisoned Light and The Arrival from the Darkness on DVD, accompanied by a bilingual printed booklet. The DVD also features extensive supplementary material, including documentaries on the restoration of cinematic works, the silent film era, and the origins of Czech filmmaking, as well as analyses of both films. Additionally, the release includes five short films by Jan S. Kolár: Lady with the Small Foot (Dáma s malou nožkou) (1919), The Oriental Languages' Teacher (Učitel orientálních jazyků) (1918), Polykarp's Winter Adventure (Polykarpovo zimní dobrodružství) (1917), The Cross by the Brook (Kříž u potoka) (1921), and The Torn Photograph (Roztržené foto) (1921).

In 2019, this two-disc release was nominated for an award in the category of best DVD/Blu-ray of films produced before 1989 at the 33rd Il Cinema Ritrovato festival in Bologna, an international event dedicated to archival and restored cinema.

== Bibliography ==
=== Books ===
- Brož, Jaroslav; Frida, Myrtil (1959). Historie československého filmu v obrazech 1898–1930 [A History of Czechoslovak Film in Images 1898–1930]. Film Publications (in Czech). Prague: Orbis.
- Kolár, Jan Stanislav; Frida, Myrtil (1957). Československý němý film 1898–1930: základní materiály pro dějiny čs. filmu [Czechoslovak silent film 1898–1930: basic materials for the history of the Czech Republic. movie]. Library of Film and Time (in Czech). Prague: Czechoslovak Film.
- Urbanová, Eva; Urgošíková, Blažena (1995). Český hraný film [Czech feature film] (in Czech). Vol. I. 1898–1930. Prague: Czech Film Archive. ISBN 80-7004-082-3.

=== Articles ===
- Brooke, Michael (April 2019). "Příchozí z temnot/Otrávené světlo (The Arrival from The Darkness/The Poisoned Light(". Magazine of Film Preservation. No. 100. pp. 113–115. ISSN 1609-2694.
- "Otrávené světlo" [The Poisoned Light]. Český filmový zpravodaj: neodvislý filmový týdeník (in Czech). Vol. 1, no. 33–34. 29 October 1921. p. 5. ISSN 1801-9455.
- "Otrávené světlo" [The Poisoned Light]. Divadlo budoucnosti: filmový týdenník (in Czech). Vol. 2, no. 41. 1921. p. 2–3. ISSN 1801-9463.
- "Otrávené světlo" [The Poisoned Light]. Hlas lidu: Časopis hájící zájmy čtvrtého stavu (in Czech). Vol. 37, no. 131. 23 November 1922. p. 4. ISSN 1803-9901.
