= The Arrival from the Darkness =

1921 film directed by Jan S. Kolár

- Příchozí z temnot
- Directed by: Jan S. Kolár
- Written by: Karel Hloucha; Jan S. Kolár
- Starring: Theodor Pištěk; Anny Ondra; Karel Lamač
- Cinematography: Otto Heller; Otto Hoffmann
- Production company: Rexfilm
- Distributed by: Rexfilm
- Release date: 14 October 1921
- Running time: 62 minutes
- Country: Czechoslovakia
- Languages: Silent; Czech intertitles

The Arrival from the Darkness (Czech: Příchozí z temnot) is a 1921 Czechoslovak silent fantasy horror film directed by Jan S. Kolár. It was released in Germany, Austria, France, and Great Britain under the title Redivivus.

It was one of the first Czech films to achieve success in international distribution, alongside another work by Kolár, The Poisoned Light (Otrávené světlo) (1921), which premiered just a week later on 21 October 1921.

The film is considered incomplete, as about 600 metres are missing from its original length of 2,300 metres.

== Plot ==
Bohdan Dražický, a landowner and book enthusiast, receives an old book as a gift from his neighbour, Richard Bor, and immediately begins studying it. For Bor, however, this is merely a pretext to get rid of Dražický; he is courting Dražický's wife, Dagmar, and urging her to leave with him—but she refuses. While examining the book, Dražický stumbles upon a secret regarding the Black Tower and falls asleep. During his exploration of the tower, he discovers a mysterious alchemical laboratory, where he becomes trapped by a pressure-sensitive mechanism. Also present is a man who appears dead, holding a parchment with instructions how he can be revived. Following these directions, Dražický awakens his ancestor, Ješek Dražický, from a hibernation that has lasted several centuries. Together, they leave the Black Tower via a secret passage.

Ješek recounts his life at the court of Rudolf II, his collaboration with the alchemist Balthasar del Borro, and his beloved Alena, who died of the plague. Heartbroken, he drank Borro's mysterious elixir of life and fell into a deep sleep. Seeing a resemblance to his Alena in Dagmar, he decides to claim her for himself. He confesses his love to her, a declaration overheard by Dražický. Knowing from Borro's notes that Ješek must consume the elixir every three days to remain alive, Dražický destroys the supply and blows up the Black Tower with dynamite. In his desperation, Ješek abducts Dagmar, with Dražický and Bor in hot pursuit. They catch up with him by the water, and in the ensuing struggle, Bor is strangled by Ješek. Dražický fires a shot at Ješek, but at that moment, he wakes up and realises that the whole thing was just a dream. Dagmar is fine, but Bor is found dead, reportedly having suffered a stroke.

== Changes from the original concept ==
Karel Hloucha's original concept differs from Kolár's final screenplay in the change of the name of the female protagonist from Božena to Dagmar and, most significantly, in the finale itself. The character of Richard Bor—who, in the film, serves to ensure a happy ending—is entirely absent. In a dream-like confrontation with Ješek, Božena is carried off on a small boat, while Dražický is shot dead on the riverbank by a crossbow. Upon waking, he discovers that his wife has drowned after the boat capsized; he himself then dies as a result of the shock.

== Cast ==
Advertisement from the periodical Československý film, 18 July 1921, Vol. 3, No. 12, p. 32

- Theodor Pištěk as Bohdan Dražický
- Anny Ondra as Dagmar/Alena
- Karel Lamač as Ješek Dražický of Lom and Střehov, Alena's cousin
- Josef Šváb-Malostranský as old servant Jan
- Vladimír Majeras as Richard Bor/alchemist Balthazar del Borro
- Luigi Hofman as butler/Alena's father
- Jan W. Speerger as knight from a company of Ješek Dražický
- Alfred Baštýř as fisherman
- Rudolf Myzet as knight

== Production ==
The film was produced under the banner of the company Rexfilm at the Am Zoo film studios in Berlin—the same location where Kolár had made his previous film, The Song of Gold (Zpěv zlata) (1920). It was a relatively costly project, involving the construction of sets within the studio representing Prague during the reign of Rudolf II. Exterior shots were filmed at the castles of Karlštejn, Okoř, and Český Šternberk.

During production, Kolár drew inspiration from European (primarily German) cinema—most notably The Student of Prague (Der Student von Prag) (1913), directed by Stellan Rye and starring Paul Wegener. Furthermore, the scene in which Ješek is brought back to life alludes to Robert Wiene's The Cabinet of Dr. Caligari (Das Cabinet des Dr. Caligari) (1920).

This was the first Czech film in which two cameras were used simultaneously to shoot certain scenes.

== Release ==
The film was released in cinemas in Germany, Austria, France and Great Britain under the name Redivivus in 1921.

== Restored version ==
Between 2005 and 2007, restoration work was carried out on the film. This process revealed, among other things, that since 1952 (and possibly even earlier), audiences had been watching an incorrectly assembled version—though the narrative's complexity, already heightened by a fantastic plot full of flashbacks, likely masked any issues for viewers. The restored film was presented in 2013 at the 48th Karlovy Vary International Film Festival, as part of the "Return to the Sources" section.

In 2018, the Czech Film Archive released a restored version of the films The Arrival from the Darkness and The Poisoned Light on DVD, accompanied by a bilingual printed booklet. The DVD also features extensive supplementary material, including documentaries on the restoration of cinematic works, the silent film era, and the origins of Czech filmmaking, as well as analyses of both films. Additionally, the release includes five short films by Jan S. Kolár: Lady with the Small Foot (Dáma s malou nožkou) (1919), The Oriental Languages' Teacher (Učitel orientálních jazyků) (1918), Polykarp's Winter Adventure (Polykarpovo zimní dobrodružství) (1917), The Cross by the Brook (Kříž u potoka) (1921), and The Torn Photograph (Roztržené foto) (1921).

In 2019, this two-disc release was nominated for an award in the category of best DVD/Blu-ray of films produced before 1989 at the 33rd Il Cinema Ritrovato festival in Bologna, an international event dedicated to archival and restored cinema.

== Bibliography ==
=== Books ===
- Brož, Jaroslav; Frida, Myrtil (1959). Historie československého filmu v obrazech 1898–1930 [A History of Czechoslovak Film in Images 1898–1930]. Film Publications (in Czech). Prague: Orbis.
- Kolár, Jan Stanislav; Frida, Myrtil (1957). Československý němý film 1898–1930: základní materiály pro dějiny čs. filmu [Czechoslovak silent film 1898–1930: basic materials for the history of the Czech Republic. movie]. Library of Film and Time (in Czech). Prague: Czechoslovak Film.
- Urbanová, Eva; Urgošíková, Blažena (1995). Český hraný film [Czech feature film] (in Czech). Vol. I. 1898–1930. Prague: Czech Film Archive. ISBN 80-7004-082-3.

=== Articles ===
- Brooke, Michael (April 2019). "Příchozí z temnot/Otrávené světlo (The Arrival from The Darkness/The Poisoned Light(". Magazine of Film Preservation. No. 100. pp. 113–115. ISSN 1609-2694.
- "Otrávené světlo" [The Poisoned Light]. Český filmový zpravodaj: neodvislý filmový týdeník (in Czech). Vol. 1, no. 33–34. 29 October 1921. p. 5. ISSN 1801-9455.
- "Otrávené světlo" [The Poisoned Light]. Divadlo budoucnosti: filmový týdenník (in Czech). Vol. 2, no. 41. 1921. p. 2–3. ISSN 1801-9463.
- "Otrávené světlo" [The Poisoned Light]. Hlas lidu: Časopis hájící zájmy čtvrtého stavu (in Czech). Vol. 37, no. 131. 23 November 1922. p. 4. ISSN 1803-9901.
