= Dol Dauber =

Czech musician (1894–1950)

- Born: Adolf Dauber; 27 July 1894; Vyzhnytsia Bukovina, Austria-Hungary
- Died: September 15, 1950 (aged 56); Prague
- Occupations: Violinist, bandleader, composer
- Years active: c.1911–1948
- Known for: Premiering Rhapsody in Blue in Vienna; Czech film music

Adolf Dauber (known also as Dol, Doli or Dolfi Dauber) (born 27 July 1894 – died 15 September 1950) was a jazz violinist, bandleader, composer and music arranger of Jewish origin, who was active in the first half of the 20th century in Central Europe, mainly in Austria, Czechoslovakia and Germany. During his career, he collaborated with international jazz personalities, led numerous orchestras and ensembles, and created music for several films.

== Biography ==
Dauber was born to a musical family in Vyzhnytsia (Wijnitz), Bukovina, Ukraine (then Austria-Hungary). He started his musical education at the age of 4, under the mentorship of his older sister, Clara. While still in his childhood, his sister arranged an audience with Carl Flesch, a violin virtuoso and teacher at the Bucharest Conservatory. (Note: Carl Flesch worked at the Bucharest Conservatory from 1897 to 1902, on an invitation of the Romanian Queen Carmen Sylva.) His talent impressed Flesch and Dauber joined his class as the youngest pupil to be accepted.

In 1911, Flesh recommended him to the renowned Czech violinist and teacher, Otakar Ševčík. Dauber studied with Ševčík in Brno up to 1914. Even as a youngster, he earned money for his studies as a bandleader of ensembles in Chernivtsi (Czernowitz) and Lviv.

During World War I, he served as a concertmaster and soloist in a military orchestra in Italy. The opera composer Giacomo Puccini was allegedly so impressed by his playing that he dedicated to him several autograph pages from his opera Manon Lescaut. Later, Franz Lehár arranged his transfer to the renowned Austro-Hungarian military ensemble Deutschmeister.

After the war, Dauber traveled throughout Central Europe with a salon string quartet; however, ensembles of this kind were gradually replaced by modern jazz orchestras. Therefore, he refocused his energy toward modern rhythms and dance music, to the great disappointment of his teacher Ševčík. He founded a new orchestra (the line-up included saxophonist and banjo player), and performed popular melodies in Vienna and Mariánské Lázně. The performances were noted particularly for inventive and modern arrangements of classical repertoire, operetta melodies and waltzes. At that time, Dauber met and befriended various notable musicians and artists: Emmerich Kálmán, Oscar Straus, Robert Stolz and Fritz Grünbaum among others. His orchestra performed the Viennese premiere of Gershwin's Rhapsody in Blue.

In 1923, Dauber permanently resided in Vienna. In the early 1920s, he began recording for the label Homokord. His orchestra was offered a lucrative long-term contract by The Gramophone Company Ltd. For this label he recorded hundreds of songs over the course of the next 15 years. The basic cast of the orchestra included: five violins, viola, violoncello, double bass, flute, two trumpets, trombone, harp, piano and harmonium, however, the recordings marked as "jazz", "jazz-symphonic" or "dance" usually used different instrumentation: violin, double bass, banjo, two trumpets, three saxophones, trombone, accordion, euphonium and drums. The repertoire of Dauber's orchestra was remarkably wide-ranging, stretching from compositions of Karel Hašler, Jaroslav Ježek, R. A. Dvorský or Kurt Weill, to the arrangements of parts of Janáček's and Smetana's operas.

The mid-1930s were the most successful time in Dauber's career. He recorded, performed widely in Austria, Germany and Czechoslovakia, and created film music. Some of his recordings were distributed for the Czech diaspora in the US by the label Victor. However, the changing political situation in Europe caused by the rise of the Nazi regime negatively influenced his career. In 1936, Dauber and his orchestra moved to Prague and continued recording for the Czech label Ultraphon.

In 1939, Dauber traveled to England to record with a dance orchestra. He was invited to work in the US, but he declined and returned to his wife and son in Prague. His musical activities were banned due to his Jewish origin, but he was not imprisoned, allegedly because he was an "internationally renowned musician". This, however, did not prevent the Nazis from deporting his son, Robert Dauber, to the Theresienstadt concentration camp.

The information about Dauber's life in the Protectorate of Bohemia and Moravia is not clear. According to the testimony of the Czech composer and journalist Jiří Voldán, he spent a part of the war hidden by "good people". Allegedly, he had to pay for the shelter with his instrument, a Guarneri violin, a gift from the Queen Carmen Sylva. The information was, however, not confirmed by any reliable evidence. His son was sent in a transport to Auschwitz and later to Dachau, where he died shortly before the end of the war. Dol Dauber and his wife (who was a German from Brno) managed to survive, but the circumstances of his survival remain unclear.

After the World War II, Dauber briefly resumed his recording activities with the label Ultraphon. He made his last recording, a cycle of Jewish songs, in September 1948.

He died in 1950 in Prague, Czechoslovakia. The documentation related to his life and music activities is preserved in the Austrian National Library in Vienna.

== Filmography ==
Dol Dauber and his orchestra played in the following films:

- Hotel Modrá hvězda (The Blue Star Hotel)
- Eva tropí hlouposti (Eva Fools Around)
- Valentin Dobrotivý (Valentin the Good)
- Krb bez ohně

He has composed music to the films:

- Klatovští dragouni
- Umlčené rty

== Recordings ==
- Dol Dauber. Musical Fantasies and Jewish Liturgical Songs (Hudební fantazie a židovské liturgické písně, RADIOSERVIS, ŽMP 011 – 8594042080110) [CD]
- My Heart is a Jazz Band (Mé srdce je jazzband, RADIOSERVIS, ŽMP007 – 8594042080073) [CD]
