= Jan S. Kolár =

Czech film director

- Born: 11 May 1896; Prague, Austria-Hungary
- Died: 30 October 1973 (aged 77); Prague, Czechoslovakia
- Occupations: Film director Screenwriter; Actor

Jan S. Kolár (11 May 1896 – 30 October 1973) was a Czech film director, screenwriter, actor and film historian. He directed a big budget historical film St. Wenceslas.

== Life ==
Jan Stanislav Kolár was born Jan Nepomucký Josef Kohn in a Jewish family in Prague. The whole family converted to Christianity and changed their surname to Kolár. He studied law at Charles University and graduated in 1921. His favorite directors of the silent era were D. W. Griffith and Paul Wegener. He started directing films in 1917.

The most important surviving Kolár's films are a crime drama The Poisoned Light, a fantasy horror The Arrival from the Darkness, and a historical film St. Wenceslas. He stopped directing after 1929 and later worked as a studio executive in a nationalized film industry and then as a film historian in Czech Film Archive. He continued to act in supporting roles until his retirement in 1964.

In 2018 a DVD boxset with seven of Kolár's films was released by Czech Film Archive.

== Selected filmography ==
=== Director and screenwriter ===
| Year | Title | Director | Screenwriter | Notes |
|---|---|---|---|---|
| 1917 | Polykarp's Winter Adventure | Yes | Yes | Short film |
| 1918 | The Oriental Languages' Teacher | Yes | Yes | Short film |
| 1919 | Teddy Would Like to Smoke | No | Yes | Short film. Considered lost. |
| 1919 | Lady with the Small Foot | Yes | Yes | Co-directed with Přemysl Pražský. |
| 1919 | Alois Wins the Lottery | No | Yes | Considered lost. |
| 1919 | Chord of Death | Yes | Yes | Considered lost. |
| 1920 | The Missing Letters | No | Yes | |
| 1920 | The Song of Gold | Yes | Yes | Considered lost. |
| 1921 | The Cross by the Brook | Yes | Yes | |
| 1921 | The Poisoned Light | Yes | Yes | Co-directed with Karel Lamač. |
| 1921 | The Arrival from the Darkness | Yes | Yes | |
| 1921 | The Torn Photograph | Yes | Yes | Short film |
| 1922 | The Maharajah's Pleasure | No | Yes | Considered lost. |
| 1922 | The Dead are Living | Yes | Yes | Considered lost. |
| 1925 | Parnasie | No | Yes | |
| 1925 | The Sun Disciples | No | Yes | |
| 1926 | The Three Loves of Řina Sezimová | Yes | Yes | |
| 1928 | Eve's Daughters | No | Yes | |
| 1929 | St. Wenceslas | Yes | Yes | |
| 1937 | Blackmailer | No | Yes | |
