= Camel Through the Eye of a Needle =

1936 film by Hugo Haas

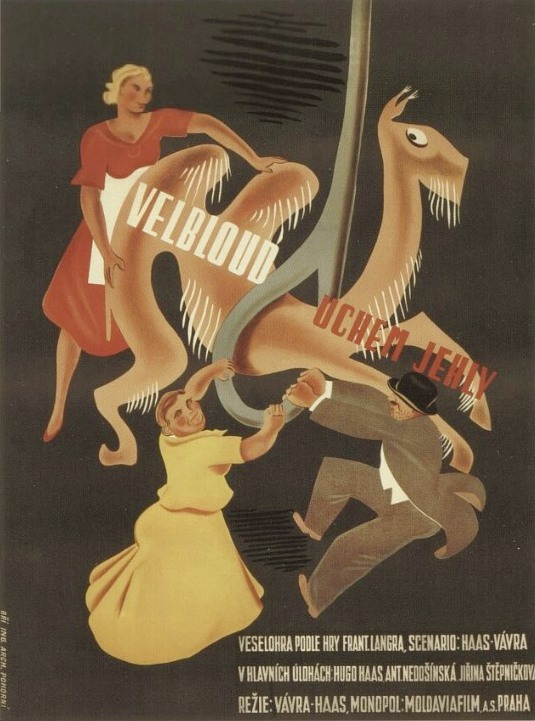
- Film poster
- Directed by: Hugo Haas; Otakar Vávra
- Written by: Hugo Haas; Otakar Vávra
- Based on: Velbloud uchem jehly by František Langer
- Produced by: Josef Stein
- Starring: Hugo Haas; Antonie Nedošinská; Jiřina Štěpničková
- Cinematography: Ferdinand Pečenka
- Edited by: Jan Kohout
- Music by: Julius Kalaš
- Production company: Moldavia
- Distributed by: Moldavia
- Release date: January 19, 1937
- Running time: 86 minutes
- Country: Czechoslovakia
- Language: Czech

Camel Through the Eye of a Needle (Czech: Velbloud uchem jehly) is a 1936 Czech comedy film directed by and starring Hugo Haas. The title is an allusion to the "eye of a needle" aphorism. It's a second movie adaptation of the play by František Langer after the 1926 film Never the Twain.

== Plot ==
Alík, son of a wealthy chocolate factory owner Adolf Vilím, is set to marry Nina Štěpánková from a wealthy family. But Alík is not interested in Nina. He gets to know the beggar Pešta and his falls in love with his step-daughter Zuzka.

== Cast ==
- Hugo Haas as Beggar Josef Pešta
- Antonie Nedošínská as Aloise Peštová
- Jiřina Štěpničková as Zuzka Peštová
- Rudolf Deyl Sr. as Adolf Vilím
- Pavel Herbert as Alík Vilím
- Oldřich Nový as Butler Alfons
- Eduard Blažek as Secretary
- Růžena Šlemrová as Mrs. Štěpánová
- Adina Mandlová as Nina Štěpánová
- Jindřich Plachta as Pavel Bezchyba
- Jan Pivec as Fred Krupička
- Božena Šustrová as Nina's friend

== See also ==
- Never the Twain (1926)
