= The Lovers of an Old Criminal =

1927 film

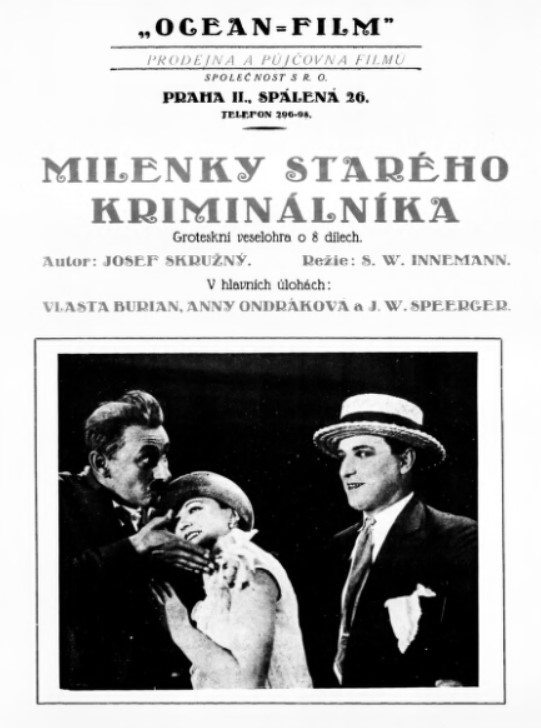
- Directed by: Svatopluk Innemann
- Written by: Josef Skružný; Elmar Klos
- Starring: Jan W. Speerger; Vlasta Burian; Anny Ondra
- Cinematography: Otto Heller
- Production company: Oceanfilm
- Distributed by: Oceanfilm
- Release date: 7 October 1927
- Country: Czechoslovakia
- Languages: Silent; Czech intertitles

The Lovers of an Old Criminal (Czech: Milenky starého kriminálníka) is a 1927 Czechoslovak comedy film directed by Svatopluk Innemann.

== Cast ==
- Jan W. Speerger as Pardon
- Vlasta Burian as Cyril Pondělíček / Alois Kanibal
- Anny Ondra as Fifi Hrazánková (as Anny Ondráková)
- Emilie Nitschová as Fifi's Mother
- Jiří Hron as Fifi's Admirer
- Betty Kysilková as Štefanie Lesczynská
- Věra Hlavatá as Olga Lesczynská
- Jindřich Plachta as Kristián
- Rudolf Sůva as Alois Pivoňka
- František Černý as Gardener
- Jarka Pižla as Gardener's Helper
- Ladislav H. Struna as Apache
- Elsa Vetešníková as Apachewoman
- Frantisek Juhan as Fifi's Chauffeur
- Ferry Seidl as Doorman

== Release ==
The film was reconstructed in 2008 and re-released in cinemas with live music by Neuvěřitelno in 2015. The film was released on DVD by Czech Film Archive in 2015.
