= From Saturday to Sunday =

1931 film

- Theatrical release poster
- Directed by: Gustav Machatý
- Written by: Vítězslav Nezval; Gustav Machatý
- Produced by: František Horký
- Starring: Ladislav H. Struna
- Cinematography: Václav Vích
- Edited by: Gustav Machatý
- Music by: Jaroslav Ježek
- Production company: A-B
- Distributed by: Lloyd
- Release date: 1 May 1931
- Running time: 72 minutes
- Country: Czechoslovakia
- Language: Czech

From Saturday to Sunday (Czech: Ze soboty na neděli) is a 1931 Czech drama film directed by Gustav Machatý based on a screenplay by Vítězslav Nezval. Art Director on the film was Alexandr Hackenschmied.

== Cast ==
- Ladislav H. Struna as Karel Benda, typesetter
- Magda Maděrová as Máňa, audio typist
- Jiřina Šejbalová as Nany, audio typist
- Karel Jičínský as Mr. Ervín
- R. A. Dvorský as Pavel
- F. X. Mlejnek as Announcer
- Mimi Erbenová as Nightclub attendant
- Jan Richter as Drunkard
- František Sauer as Drunkard
- Míla Svoboda as Drunkard
- Václav Menger as Police officer
- Leo Marten as Club dancer
- Aša Vašátková as Club dancer
- Milada Matysová as Club dancer

== Production ==
From Saturday to Sunday was Machatý's first sound film, which caused problems with financing. Studios weren't ready to spend resources on the sound movie for a small market. In the end the financing was provided by A-B production company and the film was shot at sound stages at A-B studios in Vinohrady. Jazz inspired soundtrack was composed by Jaroslav Ježek with Nezval writing the song lyrics. In 1932 a French dubbed version of the film was released under the name D’une nuit a l’autre.

== Reception ==
The contemporary local reviews were mixed. The critics praised the film visuals, camera work and editing, but criticised "banal and sentimental" story. The film was well-received in France.

== Home release ==
The film was digitally restored in 2017 and released on Blu-ray and DVD by Czech Film Archive.
