= A Charming Man =

1941 film by Martin Frič

- Directed by: Martin Frič
- Written by: Karel Steklý
- Starring: Oldřich Nový
- Cinematography: Václav Hanus
- Edited by: Jan Kohout
- Release date: 4 July 1941
- Running time: 86 minutes
- Country: Protectorate of Bohemia and Moravia
- Language: Czech

A Charming Man (Czech: Roztomilý člověk) is a Czechoslovak comedy film directed by Martin Frič. It was released in 1941.

== Cast ==
- Oldřich Nový as Viktor Bláha
- Ladislav Pešek as Jam Valtera
- Nataša Gollová as Polda Krusinová
- Lída Chválová as Karla Hasková
- Theodor Pištěk as Vitalis Hasek
- Ella Nollová as Grandmother Hasková
- Raoul Schránil as Ing. Ivan Molenda
- Jaroslav Marvan as JUDr. Kouril, advokát
- František Filipovský as Jaroslav Stárek
- Antonín Zacpal as Prof. Matousek
- Svetla Svozilová as Matousek's wife
- Zdeňka Baldová as Mrs. Malá, widow
- Blažena Slavíčková as Emilka
- Ferenc Futurista as Mr. Fretka
- Marie Blazková as Woman
