= Jiří Langer =

Jewish Czech poet, translator and writer (1894–1943)

Jiří Mordechai Langer
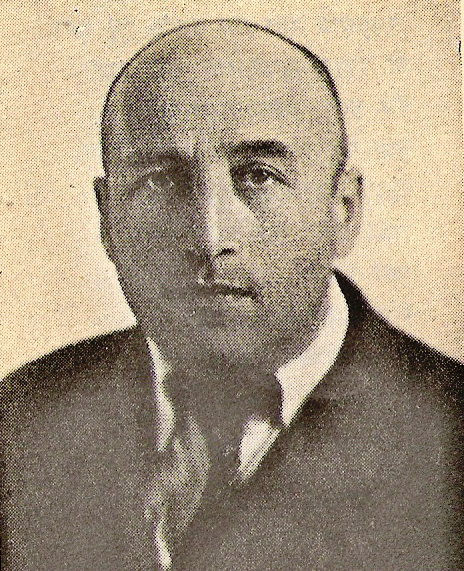
- Born: 19 March 1894; Prague, Austria-Hungary
- Died: 12 March 1943 (aged 48); Tel Aviv, British Mandate Palestine
- Occupation: Writer
- Writing career
- Notable works: Die Erotik der Kabbala; Devět bran

Jiří (Georg(o)) Mordechai Langer (19 March 1894 – 12 March 1943) was a Hebrew poet, scholar and essayist, journalist and teacher.

== Early life ==
Langer had been born to Europeanized Jewish family and attended Czech schools. His older brothers were Josef, and František Langer who was a successful playwright, legionnaire and military doctor. Jiří first became interested in mysticism through the poet Otokar Březina and his friend Alfred Fuchs.

At age 19, Langer travelled to Belz to join the Hasidic movement of Yissachar Dov Rokeach. He later described this journey and his experience in the Hasidic shtetl in the book Nine Gates to Hasidic Mysteries (cz. "Devět bran").

== World War I ==
At the outbreak of World War I he was drafted to the Austro-Hungarian army, but due to his religious beliefs had trouble integrating into army life. For refusing to obey orders that would violate halacha, he was imprisoned in military jail. After being released he returned to the Belzer Hasidim which had been exiled to Hungary during the war years. During this time he deepened his studies of Torah, Talmud, Midrash, and Kabbalah and lived the hasidic life together with the community.

== Between the Wars ==
He reunited with his brother František two years after the end of World War I. Although he no longer dressed like a hasidic Jew, he retained his religious belief, and ate only kosher food. During this time he published Die Erotik der Kabbala, under the influence of Sigmund Freud in which he combined Jewish mysticism with psychoanalysis; in particular, he was looking for a connection with erotic symbolism. However, his directness and uncriticalness towards Freud's theses made this work unpopular.

He taught at the Jewish school in Prague, was an official of the Central Union of Zionists and the Jewish National Fund. His lifelong friendship with the writer Max Brod began during this period. He also befriended writer Franz Kafka.

He also wrote poems in Hebrew and was said to be perhaps the only poet writing in Hebrew in Western Europe. In addition to Hebrew and the main European languages, he also mastered Yiddish, Aramaic and Arabic.

In 1929, he published the collection Pijutim ve-širej jedidut (Poems and Songs of Friendship). A second collection Me'at cori (A drop of balm) was published posthumously in 1943 in Tel Aviv. The basic message of his poetry, according to Miriam Drorová, is: "Man and the universe are in the power of forces beyond their control. Man does not control his actions in a deeper sense at all and acts as if in a dream from which he cannot wake up, although prophets, mystics, poets and philosophers try to do so. Human fate is to live on the edge of the abyss, and with this fate, man remains completely alone."

== Langer's literary highlight ==
Langer continued to remained a devout Jew yet attended concerts and the theater, things foreign to Hasidic Jews.

His most important work is Devĕt bran, published in English as Nine Gates to the Chasidic Mysteries. It is a collection of Hasidic legends important because it chronicles the tales and lifestyle of Hasidic Jews before the Holocaust from the perspective of a Baal Teshuvah.

"To write this book, my brother Jiří Langer had to transport himself from the living reality of the twentieth century into the mystical and ecstatic atmosphere of the Middle Ages. Nor could this be effected merely in a metaphorical way, on the wings of fantasy... Jiří found himself five hundred kilometers away to the east, and simultaneously two or even five centuries back in time." wrote his brother František in the introduction.

The book was not published until 1937.

The famed writer Isaac Bashevis Singer, in a review of the book wrote "The reader need not make his way through scholarly introductions, sociological theories, historical analyses. He enters straight into the gates of Hasidism and it is not important if he begins at the first gate or at the fifth. Jiri Langer guides him through the Hasidic courts (which are now ashes), sits him down on a bench with the other Hasidim, and bids him listen to their stories... the Nine Gates is thus not primarily for those whose approach to Hasidism is detached and analytical, although it would even be interesting to them. It is a book for the reader who wants to breathe Hasidic air."

== World War II, move to Israel and death ==
In the autumn of 1939, Jiří decided to emigrate to the Land of Israel and headed for Constantinople via Slovakia. The ships were delayed by the Nazis under various pretexts, until they were caught by severe frosts in the port of Sulina. The river froze and the ships with it. People were trapped in -30 degrees Celsius weather and with little food and diseases spread. This lasted until February 1940, when with the help of Czech compatriots they landed in Romania and with the intervention of the ambassador to the British government, they were rescued and transported to Istanbul. Jiří took it especially hard, because he filled his luggage mainly with his favorite books. He took 200 of them and, in addition to pneumonia, he also developed a kidney inflammation.

Jiří eventually reached the Land of Israel but he spent much of his time there in hospitals. Nevertheless, he did not stop working and began to translate his Hasidic legends into Hebrew and a follow-up to Nine Gates.

He wrote Hebrew poetry which were published in magazines. He reunited with his close friends Max Brod and his wife who often visited him in the hospital.

Langer died in 1943 and was buried in the Nachalat Yitzchak Cemetery in Giv'atayim. His writings were retained by the revered writer Dov Sadan who later donated them to the National Library of Israel.

== Legacy ==
The Nine Gates Festival of Czech-German-Jewish Culture took place in Prague on an annual basis for many years Pavel Dostal the Czech Cultural Minister said the Nine Gates Festival reminded citizens of the 1,000-year history of the Jewish people in Czech lands, of “its vitality, its wisdom and creative potential, and its significant contribution to Czech culture.”

In 2011 LGBT historian Shaun Jacob Halper published an article in the Jewish Quarterly Review entitled Coming out of the Hasidic closet: Jiří Mordechai Langer (1894–1943) and the fashioning of homosexual-Jewish identity which uses Langer's 1923 book Die Erotik der Kabbala to "contextualize this long-neglected text within Langer's fascinating biography; the debates in the early homosexual rights movement; the particular cultural features of the 'Prague circle' in which Langer wrote."

== Publications ==
- Die Erotik der Kabbala (The Eroticism of Kabbalah; 1923)
- [Zur] Funktion der Jüdischen Türpfostenroll (The Function of the Mezuzah; 1928)
- Piyyutim ve-Shirei Yedidot (Liturgical Songs and Poems of Friendship; 1929) (Hebrew)
- Die (Jüdischen) Gebetriemen (The [Jewish] Phylacteries; 1931)
- Devĕt bran (Nine Gates; 1937). En traduction : Les Neuf Portes du Ciel. Les secrets du hassidisme (traduit en français par Jacqueline et Cécile Rastoin, et Lena Korba-Novotna; Albin Michel, 1997).
- Talmud: ukázky a dĕjiny (Talmud: Anthology and History; 1938)
- Zpĕvy zavržených (The Poems of the Rejected; 1938)
- Meʻaṭ Tsori: Shirim (A bit of my Balm: Poems; 1943) (Tel Aviv, Hebrew)

== Bibliography ==
- Walter Koschmal: Der Dichternomade: Jiří Mordechai Langer, ein tschechisch-jüdischer Autor. Böhlau, Köln 2010, ISBN 978-3-412-20393-1
- Shaun Jacob Halper: Mordechai Langer (1894–1943) and the Birth of the Modern Jewish Homosexual. University of California, Berkeley 2013
- The YIVO Encyclopedia of Jews in Eastern Europe: Langer, Jiří
