= Josef Skružný =

Czech writer and journalist

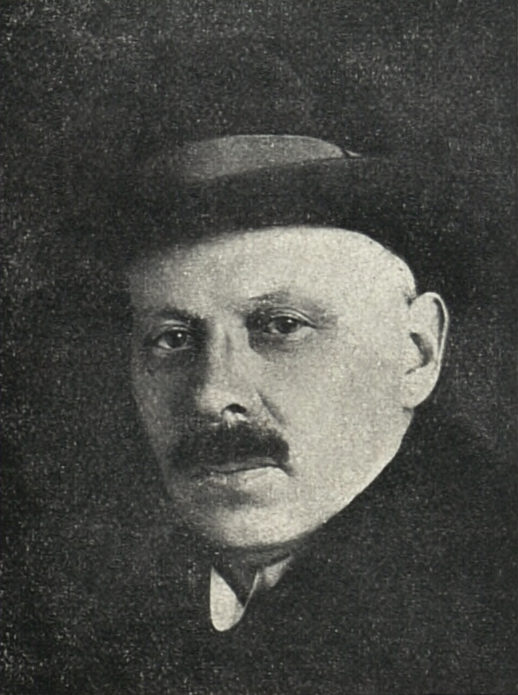
Josef Skružný

Josef Skružný (15 March 1871 in Prague – 12 May 1948) was a Czech writer and journalist. As well as writing under his own name, he used various pseudonyms, including Venouš Dolejš (alternatively Venoušek Dolejš), Matouš Česnek, and Venouš Huňáček.

== Biography ==
Skružný was born in 1871 in Dolní Krč, which was later merged into Prague. He was trained as a stone-cutter before becoming a journalist for Humoristické listy, a political satire magazine, where he contributed with short stories and cartoons. During the 1910s he was a friend of other satirists including Josef Lada and Jaroslav Hašek. During the First Republic of Czechoslovakia, Skružný was a popular author of dramatic and satirical novels, many of which were made into films. He named his villa in Zbraslav near Prague, "Venoušek a Stázička", after one of his most successful works.

Skružný began writing film scripts with his nephew, Elmar Klos, in the 1920s. Together, they wrote five scripts that later developed into feature films, directed by Svatopluk Innemann.

Skružný died in 1948 in Zbraslav.
