= Oldřich Nový =

Czech actor (1899–1983)

- Born: 7 August 1899; Prague, Bohemia, Austria-Hungary
- Died: 15 March 1983 (aged 83); Prague, Czechoslovakia
- Occupation: Actor
- Spouse: Alice Valentová-Nová (née Alice Wienerová-Mahlerová)

Oldřich Nový (7 August 1899 – 15 March 1983) was a Czech film and theatre actor, director, composer, dramaturge and singer. He is considered one of the greatest actors of the Czech cinema in the first half of the 20th century.

== Biography ==
Oldřich Nový was born in Prague on 7 August 1899. His father Antonín Nový, a member of the Prague Fire Brigade, wanted him to become a typographer, but Oldřich showed passion for theatre from a young age. He was supported by his uncle Miloš Nový, a well-known actor of the National Theatre in Prague. In 1916, Nový became involved with the amateur theatre group "Řemeslnická beseda" and he also appeared in the popular cabaret "U labutě". A year later he performed in the "Varieté" in Karlín Music Theatre. In 1918 he was engaged in Ostrava and in 1919 he moved to Brno where he became the director of the operetta ensemble of the National Theatre. Nový remained in Brno for more than fifteen years and came back to Prague in 1935.

In 1935 he co-founded the "Nové divadlo" (The New Theatre) together with his wife Alice Valentová-Nová (née Alice Wienerová-Mahlerová). There he attempted to develop the "musical comedy" genre and to combine spoken word with traditional operetta style into a new and modern expression. His theatre was characterized as an "operetta for cultured people" (Eduard Bass). However, the first success only came after his film performances.

During the German occupation of Czechoslovakia Oldřich Nový became a target for the fascist press and was persecuted by Nazis. His wife was of Jewish origin and Nový refused to divorce her. As a consequence they were both imprisoned in the German concentration camp in Osterode in 1944. His wife was imprisoned probably in Theresienstadt, which she survived, unlike half of her family including her father. As a result of her trauma she developed schizophrenia.

In the second half of the 1940s the Czechoslovak theatres were nationalized and Nový "donated" his scene to the newly formed communist state. Operetta and the "musical comedy" were considered a bourgeois anachronism in that time and the communist régime banned also the film productions which weren't in compliance with the socialist realism. Following that he was deputed to lead the "Divadlo Umění lidu" in Prague-Karlín, together with Jan Werich. From 1950 to 1955 he has worked as a dramaturg of the "Czechoslovak film" and later was engaged as a director of the State Theatre in Karlín (1955–1960). In Karlín he finally managed to stage the classical operetta repertoire (Polish Blood, Orpheus in the Underworld, Die Fledermaus, Mamzelle Nitouche and Rose-Marie).

In the 1960s Nový also appeared on Czechoslovak television, where he performed in the popular TV series "Taková normální rodinka" (1967–1971). His last theatre role was a title character of the play "Hodinový hoteliér" by Pavel Landovský, directed by Evald Schorm.

In his later years Nový almost never left his flat, to avoid his fans and publicity.

== Film career ==
Oldřich Nový first appeared in the film Neznámá kráska in 1922. However, he began to perform in films more regularly only in the second half of the 1930s, following his return from Brno. At first he acted in somewhat trivial comedies, and his first promising performance was the small role of a reticent valet in the film adaptation of the play Velbloud uchem jehly by Hugo Haas and Otakar Vávra. In 1937 he met with renowned pre-war director Mac Frič. The two began their collaboration the same year, but their first success came in 1939, with the comedy Kristián. Nový appeared in the title role together with Adina Mandlová and Nataša Gollová. Kristián was a very successful film and Nový suddenly became a movie star in Czechoslovakia. In the next crazy comedy – Eva tropí hlouposti – Nový appeared together with Gollová. In both films, Nový portrayed two characters in one. In 1939 he acted together with Lída Baarová in the comedy Dívka v modrém.

Following World War II Nový starred in Parohy, directed by Alfréd Radok. In 1949 Mac Frič made a brilliant parody of pre-war kitsch films – Pytlákova schovanka aneb Šlechetný milionář. Nový appeared as millionaire René Skalský.

In the 1950s Nový also conformed with the new régime and occasionally appeared in the comedies influenced by socialist realism, such as Slovo dělá ženu (1952) and Hudba z Marsu (1955). These films are considered rather marginal in his filmography.

Joel Grey played Nový in Lars von Trier's film Dancer in the Dark (2000).

== Filmography ==
- Taková normální rodinka (1971) – as Jan Koníček
- Muž, který rozdával smích (1970)
- Světáci (Men about Town) (1969) – Professor
- Fantom Morrisvillu (The Phantom of Morrisville) (1966) – Drummer Emil/Sir Hannibal Morris
- Alibi na vodě (1965) – Photographer
- Káťa a krokodýl (Kathy and Crocodile) (1965) – Man with umbrella
- Dva z onoho světa (1962) – Pavel Fort/Petr Ford
- Bílá spona (1960) – Horák
- Kde alibi nestačí (1960) – Hotel director Kraus
- O věcech nadpřirozených (1958)
- Nechte to na mně (Leave It to Me) (1955) – Patočka
- Hudba z Marsu (Music from Mars) (1955) – Composer Jiří Karas
- Slovo dělá ženu (1952) – Ludvík Zach
- Pytlákova schovanka (The Poacher's Ward) (1949) – René Skalský
- Parohy (The Antlers) (1947) – Viktorin
- Jenom krok (Only a Step) (1945)
- Paklíč (1944) – Gabriel Anděl
- Sobota (de:Samstag ist kein Alltag) (1944) – Richard Herbert
- Valentin Dobrotivý (Valentin the Good) (1942) – Valentin Plavec
- Hotel Modrá hvězda (The Blue Star Hotel) (1941) – Vladimír Rychta Rohan
- Roztomilý člověk (A Charming Man) (1941) – Viktor Bláha
- Turbína (1941)
- Když Burian prášil / Baron Prášil (Baron Munchhausen) (1940) – Arnošt Benda
- Dívka v modrém (1940) – Notary Jan Karas
- Život je krásný (Life Is Beautiful) (1940) – Writer Jan Herold
- Přítelkyně pana ministra (The Minister's Girlfriends) (1940) – Jan Hrubý
- Dědečkem proti své vůli (The Reluctant Grandfather) (1939) – Richard Osten
- Eva tropí hlouposti (1939) – Michal Norr
- Kristián (Christian) (1939) – Alois Novák alias Kristián
- Třetí zvonění (The Third Ringing) (1938) – Dr Jan Hudec
- Advokátka Věra (Lawyer Vera) (1937) – Petr 'Tygr' Kučera
- Důvod k rozvodu (Grounds for Divorce) (1937) – Pavel Bertl
- Falešná kočička (The False Pussycat) (1937) – MUDr Vladimír Přelouč
- Na tý louce zelený (1936)
- Rozkošný příběh (Delightful Story) (1936) – Jaroslav Nerad
- Uličnice (Minx) (1936) – Antonio Morreti alias Josef Hřebík
- Velbloud uchem jehly (Camel Through the Eye of a Needle) (1936) – Valet Alfons
- Rozpustilá noc (1934) – Monokl Fredy
- Never the Twain (1926)
- Neznámá kráska (The Mysterious Beauty) (1922) – Petr Stamati

Songs

- Kombiné něžné [CD]
