= Two Mothers (1921 film) =

1921 film

- Directed by: Přemysl Pražský
- Written by: Přemysl Pražský; Anna Benhartová
- Based on: Dvě matky by Emilie Richebourg
- Cinematography: Ferdinand Fiala
- Production company: Umfilm
- Distributed by: Gloriafilm
- Release date: 5 February 1921
- Country: Czechoslovakia
- Languages: Silent; Czech intertitles

Two Mothers (Czech: Dvě matky) is a 1921 Czechoslovak romantic drama film directed by Přemysl Pražský. The film is considered lost.

== Cast ==
- Helena Friedlová
- Marta Májová
- Jiří Myron
- Theodor Pištěk
- Růžena Šlemrová
- Marie Ptáková
- Přemysl Pražský
- Béda Pražský
