= White Paradise (1924 film) =

1924 film

- Directed by: Karel Lamač
- Written by: Karel Lamač; Martin Frič
- Starring: Karel Lamač; Vladimír Majer; Anny Ondra
- Cinematography: Otto Heller
- Production company: Kalos
- Distributed by: Kalos
- Release date: 1 August 1924
- Running time: 67 minutes
- Country: Czechoslovakia
- Language: Silent with Czech intertitles
- Budget: 90,000 Kčs

White Paradise (Czech: Bílý ráj) is a 1924 Czechoslovak film melodrama directed by Karel Lamač. The film was reconstructed in 2016.

== Plot ==
Orphan girl Nina lives in the mountain region with her foster father innkeeper Rezek. She falls in love with an escaped prisoner Ivan Holar.

== Cast ==
- Karel Lamač as Ivan Holar
- Vladimír Majer as Innkeeper Jakub Rezek
- Anny Ondra as Orphan Nina Mirelová
- Josef Rovenský as Puppeteer Tomáš
- Saša Dobrovolná as Ivan's mother
- Jan W. Speerger as Gendarme
- Karel Schleichert as Gendarme
- Karel Fiala as Prison director
- Lo Marsánová as Yvetta Karenová
- Přemysl Pražský as Prison guard
- Mario Karas as Bailiff
- Martin Frič as Doctor
- Anna Lamačová-Karinská as Yvetta
- Gustav Machatý as Yvetta's fiancée
- Marie Veselá as Neighbour
