= De Spooktrein =

1939 film by Karel Lamač

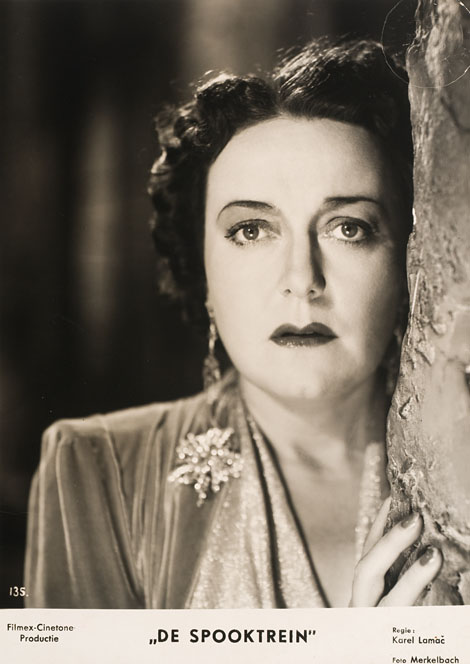
- Directed by: Carl Lamac
- Written by: Kees Bruynse; Nico De Jong
- Release date: 28 September 1939
- Running time: 70 minutes
- Country: Netherlands
- Language: Dutch

De Spooktrein is a 1939 Dutch horror film, directed by Carl Lamac.

It is an adaptation of the popular British play The Ghost Train by Arnold Ridley.

== Cast ==
- Jan Musch as Barendse
- Fien de la Mar as Julia van Dongen
- Louis Borel as Ted
- Adolphe Engers as Professor Alberto
- Cissy Van Bennekom as Corrie
- Sara Heyblom as Juffrouw Borneman
- Chris Baay as Eddy van Nie
- Lies de Wind as Mieke
- Lau Ezerman as Treinconducteur
- Nico De Jong]as Dr. Looman
- John Gobau
- Piet Rienks as Bendeleider
- Hans Tiemeyer as Inspecteur Bloemhof
