= Daughter of the Regiment (1933 film) =

Film based on the 1840 Donizetti opera

- German: Die Tochter des Regiments
- Directed by: Carl Lamac
- Written by: Hans H. Zerlett
- Produced by: Artur Hohenberg; Nikolaus Nowik
- Starring: Anny Ondra; Werner Fuetterer; Adele Sandrock
- Cinematography: Otto Heller; Ernst Mühlrad; Kurt Neubert
- Music by: Jára Benes; Curt Lewinnek
- Production companies: Ondra-Lamac-Film; Vandor Film
- Distributed by: Kiba Kinobetriebsanstalt (Austria)
- Release date: 31 March 1933
- Countries: Austria; Germany
- Language: German

Daughter of the Regiment (German: Die Tochter des Regiments) is a 1933 Austrian-German comedy film directed by Carl Lamac and starring Anny Ondra, Werner Fuetterer and Adele Sandrock. It is loosely based on the 1840 opera La fille du regiment by Gaetano Donizetti, with the setting updated from the Napoleonic to the First World War. A separate French-language version was also released, with Ondra reprising her role.

== Plot ==
A baby girl is found and rescued by a Scottish regiment during the First World War and adopted as the regiment's daughter. Many years later she is a grown-up when the Highlanders are sent on a special mission to the mountains of Bavaria to crack down on whiskey smugglers.

== Cast ==
- Anny Ondra as Mary Dreizehn
- Werner Fuetterer as Lord Robert
- Adele Sandrock as Lady Diana Heddingbroke
- Otto Wallburg as Sergeant Bully
- Jean Aymé as Jerome
- Albert Heine as General
- Fritz Heller
- Fritz Imhoff
- Walter Jensen
- Josef Rovenský
- Franz Schafheitlin as Major
- Willy Stettner as Leutnant William
- Ilka Thimm as Lady Georgia Bettersford
- Max Willenz
