= Battalion (1927 film) =

1927 film

- Directed by: Přemysl Pražský
- Written by: Přemysl Pražský
- Based on: Batalion by Josef Hais-Týnecký
- Starring: Karel Hašler; Bronislava Livia
- Cinematography: Jaroslav Blažek
- Production company: Přemysl Pražský
- Distributed by: Julius Schmitt
- Release date: 25 December 1927
- Running time: 96 minutes
- Country: Czechoslovakia
- Languages: Silent with Czech intertitles

Battalion (Czech: Batalion) is a 1927 Czechoslovak social drama film directed by Přemysl Pražský.

== Plot ==
Lawyer František Uher discovers his wife is cheating on him. He leaves home and goes to a low-class pub 'Battalion' where he meets various characters from the bottom of the society. He becomes their defender.

== Production ==
Battalion is an adaptation of a short story and later a play by Josef Hais-Týnecký. The story was inspired by a real life of 19th century lawyer and member of parliament František Uher who ended up as an alcoholic and a beggar. The film was shot in A-B studio in Vinohrady and in Kavalírka studio. The outdoor scenes were shot in the streets of Prague.

== Cast ==
- Karel Hašler as Lawyer František Uher
- Bronislava Livia as Uher's wife Zdenka
- Vladimír Pospíšil-Born as Lover of Uher's Wife
- Karel Noll as Former soldier Vondra
- Eman Fiala as Tuberculosis patient Eda
- Eugen Wiesner as Former actor Mušek
- Karel Švarc as Dog thief Bylina
- Josef Wanderer as Judge
- Nelly Kovalevská as Judge's daughter Olga
- Rudolf Růžička as Olga's fiancée Alfréd
- Vladimír Smíchovský as Bricklayer Rokos
- Roza Schlesingerová as Rokos' wife

== Release ==
The film's premiere was held in cinema Olympic in Prague, on 25 December 1927. Communist journalist Julius Fučík criticized the film for being too sentimental and distasteful, but praised the technical qualities. Today Battalion is considered one of the best Czech silent films. The film was released on DVD in 2017 with newly recorded music by Kryštof Mařatka.
