= The Blue Star Hotel =

1941 film by Martin Frič

- Directed by: Martin Frič
- Written by: Václav Wasserman; Martin Frič
- Produced by: Oldřich Papež
- Starring: Nataša Gollová; Oldřich Nový; Adina Mandlová
- Cinematography: Ferdinand Pečenka
- Edited by: Jan Kohout
- Music by: Sláva Eman Nováček
- Production company: Lucernafilm
- Distributed by: Lucernafilm
- Release date: August 28, 1941
- Running time: 89 minutes
- Country: Protectorate of Bohemia and Moravia
- Language: Czech

The Blue Star Hotel (Czech: Hotel Modrá hvězda) is a Czechoslovak comedy film directed by Martin Frič. It is a remake of Karel Lamač's German film The Love Hotel.

== Cast ==
- Nataša Gollová as Zuzana Nedbalová
- Oldřich Nový as Vladimír Rychta Rohan
- Adina Mandlová as Milada Landová
- Karel Černý as Milada's father
- Ladislav Pešek as Cook Zdeněk Junek
- Jan Pivec as Musician Jirka Tůma
- Antonín Novotný as Composer František Sojka
- Ferenc Futurista as Drunkard
- Jára Kohout as Security
- Karel Dostal as Hotel General Manager
- Čeněk Šlégl as Hotel Manager
- František Roland as Notary
- Vojtech Novák as Psychiatrist
- Marie Nademlejnská as Miss Fafejtová, owner of Hotel Merkur
- Ella Nollová as Thief in Hotel Modrá Hvězda
