= Robert Dauber =

Austrian musician

- Born: 27 August 1922
- Died: 24 March 1945 (aged 22)

Robert Dauber (27 August 1922 – 24 March 1945) was an Austrian Jewish composer, pianist and cellist.

== Life ==
He was born in Vienna in 1922. His father was a famous Jewish violinist Dol Dauber from Bukovina. His mother was a Bohemian German from Brno. The whole family moved to Prague in 1936. Robert was sent to Theresienstadt concentration camp on 8 August 1942. He participated in the musical life there. He performed the cello part in the opera Brundibár. He was transported to Dachau on 28 September 1944. He was killed there on 24 March 1945.

== Works ==
A Serenade for violin and piano is his only preserved composition.
