= The Thief of Bagdad (1952 film) =

1952 film

- Directed by: Karel Lamač
- Written by: Gustav Kampendonk
- Based on: The Thief of Bagdad; 1940 film by Lajos Bíró
- Produced by: Fritz Kirchhoff
- Starring: Sonja Ziemann; Rudolf Prack; Paul Kemp
- Cinematography: Willy Winterstein
- Edited by: Rosemarie Weinert
- Music by: Michael Jary; Lotar Olias
- Production company: Pontus Film
- Distributed by: Deutsche Cosmopol Film
- Release date: 10 April 1952
- Running time: 91 minutes
- Country: West Germany
- Language: German

The Thief of Bagdad (German: Die Diebin von Bagdad) is a 1952 West German musical comedy film directed by Karel Lamac and starring Theo Lingen, Paul Kemp, Sonja Ziemann and Rudolf Prack. It is not a remake of the 1940 film of the same name, but a comedy about the magic tricks of a female thief in Old Baghdad. It was filmed at the Bendestorf Studios in Lower Saxony. The film's sets were designed by the art directors Heinrich Beisenherz and Alfred Bütow.

== Plot summary ==
Caliph Omar does not have it easy. He is a weak ruler who is led around by servants. In marriage, wife Suleika takes the dominant role and gives her husband so little money that he cannot even bribe the eunuchs who guard his harem. Without bribery, he is not allowed into his harem and becomes frustrated. One day, Suleika tells him that she is expecting Prince Ali to visit. He has just crossed the state border and is in an area where the king of the highwaymen, Achmed, is causing trouble. Suleika sends guards to bring Ali safely to the palace in Baghdad. Ali, meanwhile, has a prestige problem because his camel, which he brought as a gift, has died on the journey. He has a search for a beautiful woman that he could give to the Caliph for his harem. His guards choose Fatme, who can sing and dance beautifully, but robs her audience in the process. Fatme travels around with the juggler and magician Ibrahim, who is looking for a rejuvenating spell. The magic word he utters, however, causes him and Fatme to change shape. He is now in her body, while Fatme finds herself in Ibrahim's old body. Ibrahim, in the form of Fatme, is kidnapped by Ali's men. A little later, Achmed attacks Ali and finds the supposed young woman he spontaneously wants to seduce. Ibrahim steals an earring from him and then manages to escape. He and Fatme reach Baghdad, where they can lift the spell.

Meanwhile, Achmed has assumed Ali's identity, as he wanted to get into the caliph's palace anyway to steal the state treasure. He moves into Baghdad with his gang members Hadji and Ommar and feigns great interest in the elderly caliph. In the end, it is Hadji who wants to find out the location of the state treasure from Suleika through intense flirting. Fatme had recently stolen a valuable garment from Suleika and has been followed by the palace guards ever since. She gets into the palace by chance and becomes part of a dance performance. The guards recognize her as the thief, Achmed as the young woman he fell in love with in the desert outside Baghdad, and Caliph Omar as a potential new addition to his harem. After the performance ends, Fatme is initially intercepted by Achmed, who is surprised that the young woman claims to have never seen him before. Shortly afterwards, Fatme is captured by the palace guards. Suleika wants to sentence her to a severe punishment, but Fatme is able to reduce her sentence by revealing to the Caliph a magic spell that is supposed to make men fall in love with her. In reality, it is the spell that puts her in another body. Fatme is sent to prison as normal and Achmed promises to free her.

Caliph Omar used a trick to gain access to his harem, but ends up outside the palace via a trick door. Here he meets Ibrahim, who has been looking for Fatme in vain. He slips into Omar's body using a magic spell and searches for her in the palace. His suddenly confident and determined demeanor earns him respect from his servants. However, he does not find Fatme and a short time later swaps bodies with the Caliph again. Back in the palace, the Caliph is pleased that his subordinates suddenly respect him. Hadji and Suleika have swapped bodies rather unwillingly, but this allows Hadji to enter the palace's secret treasure chambers with Achmed and Ommar. At some point Fatme manages to escape and joins the trio. The theft of the treasure fails, however, and the trio is arrested. Fatme now learns that Achmed is not a prince at all, but just an ordinary criminal. Achmed is arrested and sentenced to death. The Caliph gives Fatme the choice of saving Achmed's life by agreeing to the marriage, and Fatme agrees. The wedding with the Caliph begins a short time later, but he still wants to have Achmed and Hadji executed. Both manage to overpower the guards and smuggle Fatme out of the palace. She and Achmed become a couple and Ibrahim, who has always loved Fatme, gives her up.

== Cast ==
- Sonja Ziemann as Fatme, die Diebin von Bagdad
- Rudolf Prack as Achmed
- Paul Kemp as Kalif Omar
- Theo Lingen as Hadschi
- Fita Benkhoff as Suleika
- Hubert von Meyerinck as Hussa Hussa
- Fritz Odemar as Ibrahim
- Carl Voscherau as Sandu, Eunuch
- Walter Giller as Ommar
- Kurt Rackelmann as Hassan
- Kurt Fuß as Halef, Diener des Kalifen
- Hans Juergen Weidlich as Amento, Diener des Kalifen
- Joachim Rake as Prinz Ali
- Kurt A. Jung as Mansor
- Horst von Otto as Selim
- Horst Beck as Arzt
- Liselotte Malkowsky as Singer

== Bibliography ==
- Bock, Hans-Michael; Bergfelder, Tim, eds. (2009). The Concise Cinegraph: Encyclopaedia of German Cinema. New York: Berghahn Books. ISBN 978-1-57181-655-9.
