= Karel Havlíček Borovský (film) =

1925 film

- Directed by: Karel Lamač; Theodor Pištěk
- Written by: Karel Lamač; Theodor Pištěk
- Cinematography: Otto Heller
- Production company: Bratři Deglové
- Distributed by: Kinema
- Release date: 21 August 1925
- Running time: 59 minutes
- Country: Czechoslovakia
- Languages: Silent; Czech intertitles

Karel Havlíček Borovský is a 1925 Czechoslovak biographical film drama directed by Karel Lamač. It is about Karel Havlíček Borovský and is set during the 1848 revolutions. The film is considered lost.

== Cast ==
- Jan W. Speerger as Karel Havlíček Borovský
- Anny Ondra as Fanny Weidenhofferová
- Karel Lamač as Frantisek Havlíček
- Mary Jansová as Julie Sýkorová
- Anna Opplová as Julie's Mother
- Otto Zahrádka as Prince Windischgrätz
- Robert Ford as Staff Officer
- Rudolf Stahl as Staff Officer
- Theodor Pištěk as Weidenhoffer / minister Augustin Bach
- Max Körner as Newspaper publisher
- Běla Horská as Princess Windischgrätz
- Eduard Malý as Clerk
- Jaroslav Vojta
- Antonín Marek
