= St. Wenceslas (film) =

1930 film

- Theatrical release poster
- Directed by: Jan S. Kolár
- Written by: Jan S. Kolár; Josef Munclinger; František Horký
- Starring: Zdeněk Štěpánek; Jan W. Speerger
- Cinematography: Karel Kopřiva; Jan Stallich; Otto Heller; Václav Vích; Jindřich Brichta
- Music by: Oskar Nedbal; Jaroslav Křička
- Production companies: Elekta-Journal; Milenium-Film Praha
- Distributed by: Gong-film
- Release date: 4 April 1930
- Running time: 112 Minutes
- Country: Czechoslovakia
- Language: Czech
- Budget: 4,500,000 Kčs

St. Wenceslas (Czech: Svatý Václav) is a 1930 Czechoslovak historical film about Saint Wenceslas by Jan S. Kolár It was the most expensive Czech film to date, with the largest set constructed in Europe to accommodate an all-star cast of over a hundred, together with 5,000 extras for the lavish battle scenes.

== Cast ==
- Zdeněk Štěpánek as Wenceslaus I, Duke of Bohemia
- Jan W. Speerger as Boleslaus I, Duke of Bohemia
- Vera Baranovskaya as Ludmila of Bohemia
- Dagny Servaes as Drahomíra
- Josef Loskot as Skeř
- Erna Ženíšková as Radmila
- Jan S. Kolár as Bořivoj I, Duke of Bohemia
- Gustav Svojsík as Methodius
- Jindřich Edl as Bohemian Elder
- Josef Rovenský as Barbarian

== Production ==
=== Funding ===
The film initially received a loan of 1 million crowns by the government of Czechoslovakia — half of the film's original budget. However the budget has been increased to 4 million crowns due to filming in winter. When the film was on a verge of being terminated the government lent the production another 1 million crowns. The prime minister František Udržal also provided military equipment as well as people from the state services to finish the movie.

=== Shooting ===
The shooting started in September 1929. Exteriors were shot in Prokopské údolí, Šumava primeval forest, Křivoklát, Brdy and Unhošť. Sets of Wenceslaus' and Boleslaus' castles were built at the Strahov Stadium based on designs by Ludvík Hradský, who studied historical sources to be historically accurate. Large reflectors needed to be built for shooting the night scenes. The generators and planes were provided by the Ministry of Defence. Some scenes were filmed using five cameras. In December the production moved to Vinohrady's A-B Ateliers for interior scenes. The last big battle scene with Radslav was shot in March 1930. The whole film was shot over 82 filming days.

=== Post production ===
Orchestral music was composed by Oskar Nedbal and Jaroslav Křička. It was originally thought that the music will be synchronized with the movie, but the lack of funds proved this impossible. 40-piece orchestra accompanied the movie at its premiere. Some of the later screenings were with non-original music.

== Release ==
The film was planned to be released in 1929, 1000 years after the death of Wenceslaus. Finally released on 3 April 1930, the film wasn't a commercial success, because by that time sound films already replaced silent films in popularity. Another reason was that people were already tired of Wenceslaus celebrations that were occurring since 1929. Most of the film viewers were students at projections for schools who paid reduced admission fees.

=== Reconstruction ===
The film was reconstructed by František Balšán under the director Kolár's supervision in 1971. The music score, long considered lost, was discovered in Czech Radio archives. The film was screened in Rudolfinum accompanied by live orchestra on 28 September 2010. The projection was telecasted live by Czech Television. The film was released on DVD in the same year.
