= Prague Seamstresses =

1929 film

- Directed by: Přemysl Pražský
- Written by: Přemysl Pražský; Václav Wasserman
- Based on: Pražské švadlenky by Otto Faster
- Cinematography: Otto Heller; Josef Bulánek
- Production company: Bratři Deglové
- Distributed by: Degl a spol.
- Release date: 29 November 1929
- Running time: 73 minutes
- Country: Czechoslovakia
- Language: Silent

Prague Seamstresses (Czech: Pražské švadlenky) is a 1929 Czechoslovak comedy film directed by Přemysl Pražský.

== Cast ==
- Theodor Pištěk as Barnabáš Bernásek
- Máňa Ženíšková as Márinka, Dressmaker
- Karel Lamač as Jeník
- Marie Kopecká as Běla
- Čeněk Šlégl as Robert Řimbaba aka Mušoár
- Helena Monczáková as Serafina Škrtilová
- Jiří Hron as Vláďa Skružný
- Alois Dvorský as Isidor Kulich
- Béďa Pražský as Apprentice
- Saša Dobrovolná as Mrs. Havlová
- Darja Hajská as Cilka
