= Rudolf Antonín Dvorský =

Czech musician, composer and bandleader

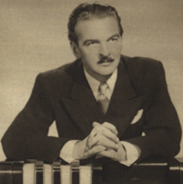
- Born: 24 March 1899; Dvůr Králové nad Labem, Bohemia, Austria-Hungary
- Died: 2 August 1966 (aged 67); Prague, Czechoslovakia
- Occupations: Singer, pianist, composer

Rudolf Antonín Dvorský (24 March 1899 – 2 August 1966) was a Czech singer, swing musician, composer and a bandleader of the Melody Boys.

== Filmography ==
- Him and His Sister (1931) - Singing postman
- From Saturday to Sunday (1931) - Pavel, friend of Ervín
- Muži v offsidu (1931) - Singer
- The Good Soldier Schweik (1931) - Commissioned officer
- The Ideal Schoolmaster (1932) - Bandleader
- The Inspector General (1933) -
- V cizím revíru (1934) - Conductor in the Hotel Richmond
- Jedna z milionu (1935) - Musician
- Raging Barbora (1935) - Singer
- Cácorka (1935) - Singer at the bar
- Pan otec Karafiát (1935) - With his orchestra Melody-boys
- Světlo jeho očí (1936) - Conductor
- Three Men in the Snow (1936) - Conductor
- Manželství na úvěr (1939) - Conductor
- Krb bez ohně (1939) - Vilém Kristen
- Malí velcí podvodníci (1939) - Dr. Pařík
- Umlčené rty (1939) - Publisher
- Lízino štěstí (1939) - Dr. Pařík
- U pokladny stál... (1939) - Singer
- Christian (1939) - Conductor and singer
- Srdce v celofánu (1939) - Singer at the operetta
- Madla zpívá Evropě (1939) - Don Manuel
- Těžký život dobrodruha (1939) - Singer
- Za tichých nocí (1939) - Conductor
- Půjčovna talentů (1939)

== Selected discography ==
- Vzpomínka na Miláno (Supraphon, 1957)
- Jen se s písničkou smát (písně z let 1938–1944) (Supraphon, 1986)
- 20x R. A. Dvorský & Melody Boys (Supraphon, 1996)
- Vzpomínky (FR centrum, 2003)
- Vzpomínky 2 (FR centrum, 2004)
- Vzpomínky 3 (FR centrum, 2005)
- Vzpomínky 4 (FR centrum, 2006)
- Rio Rita (FR centrum 2006)
