= Lady with the Small Foot =

1920 film

- Directed by: Jan S. Kolár; Přemysl Pražský
- Written by: Gustav Machatý; Jan S. Kolár
- Starring: Olga Augustová; František Pelíšek; Gustav Machatý; Anny Ondra
- Cinematography: Svatopluk Innemann
- Production company: Geem-Film
- Distributed by: Geem-Film
- Release date: 5 February 1920
- Country: Czechoslovakia
- Languages: Silent; Czech intertitles

Lady with the Small Foot (Czech: Dáma s malou nožkou) is a 1920 Czech silent comedy film directed by Jan S. Kolár and Přemysl Pražský and starring Olga Augustová, František Pelíšek and Gustav Machatý.

The actress Anny Ondra got her breakthrough in a supporting role, and soon under the direction of Karel Lamač emerged as Czechoslovakia's leading comedy star.

== Cast ==
- Olga Augustová as Lady with the Small Foot
- František Pelíšek as Tom
- Gustav Machatý as Archibald Pelich
- Přemysl Pražský as Dandy
- Svatopluk Innemann as Man in the Car
- Anny Ondra as Dandy's friend
- Jan S. Kolár as Man on the Roof
- Mása Hermanová as Murderer
- Emilie Boková as Old Street-cleaner
- Bonda Szynglarski
- František Herman
