= Otto Heller =

Czech cinematographer (1896–1970)

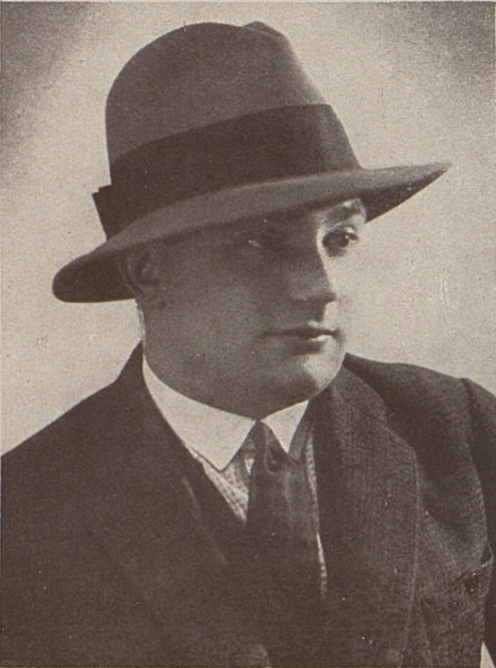
- Born: Otto Heller; 8 March 1896; Prague, Bohemia, Austria-Hungary
- Died: 19 February 1970 (aged 73); London, United Kingdom
- Occupation: Cinematographer
- Years active: 1919–1969

Otto Heller, B.S.C. (8 March 1896 – 19 February 1970) was a Czech cinematographer long resident in the United Kingdom. He worked on more than 250 films, including Richard III (1955), The Ladykillers (1955) and Peeping Tom (1960).

== Life ==
Otto Heller was born in Prague on 8 March 1896. As a teenager, he became a projectionist in the Lucerna cinema. During World War I, he worked in a film laboratory in Vienna. After the war, he started to work as a documentary cameraman at Pragafilm. During the 1920s, he was the most requested cinematographer in Czechoslovakia. Together with Karel Lamač, Anny Ondra and Václav Wasserman, he made many movies both for domestic and international audience. He often worked with Svatopluk Innemann, Martin Frič and Jan S. Kolár. Because of the rise of Nazism, he left Czechoslovakia in 1938 with Lamač.

In an interview on the making of The Ipcress File, Michael Caine recollects how Otto Heller told the story of leaving Nazi Germany in 1939. His camera crew were all Germans and they kept telling him to leave but he did not believe he needed to go and he would refuse, saying they were having a great time doing movies. Then one day his camera operator came dressed in an SS uniform and told him that he has joined the SS and urged Heller to go "now". Heller told Caine that he "went to the toilet, went out through the toilet window and I never stopped running till I got to London".

In that same interview, Caine revealed that Heller pretended throughout his career in Britain to read his light meter. After he died, Heller's instrument was found to have been "dead forever"; he had seen other cameramen using one, and felt obliged to give the impression that he too was using one. However, Caine said, Heller was such a brilliant director of photography that he would light scenes "wonderfully" using only eyesight.

He became a British citizen in 1945. Heller continued to live and make movies in UK until his death.

He died in London on 19 February 1970.

== Selected filmography ==
- The Arrival from the Darkness (1921)
- The Poisoned Light (1921)
- The Cross by the Brook (1921)
- White Paradise (1924)
- The Lantern (1925)
- The Countess from Podskalí (1926)
- The Kreutzer Sonata (1927)
- Suzy Saxophone (1928)
- Eve's Daughters (1928)
- Sinful and Sweet (1929)
- Street Acquaintances (1929)
- The Girl with the Whip (1929)
- Sin of a Beautiful Woman (1929)
- Prague Seamstresses (1929)
- The Caviar Princess (1930)
- The Cabinet of Doctor Larifari (1930)
- Fairground People (1930)
- St. Wenceslas (1930)
- The Typist (1931)
- Die Fledermaus (1931)
- The Private Secretary (1931)
- Mamsell Nitouche (1932)
- The Ringer (1932)
- Kiki (1932)
- Make-Up (1932)
- A Night in Paradise (1932)
- The Love Hotel (1933)
- Daughter of the Regiment (1933)
- Public Not Admitted (1933)
- Simone Is Like That (1933)
- Polish Blood (1934)
- The Switched Bride (1934)
- Little Dorrit (1934)
- A Woman Who Knows What She Wants (1934)
- The Young Count (1935)
- Raging Barbora (1935)
- The Eleventh Commandment (1935)
- Knockout (1935)
- Dreams Come True (1936)
- Tomorrow We Live (1936)
- Port Arthur (1936)
- Secret Lives (1937)
- Threats (1940)
- Sarajevo (1940)
- Alibi (1942)
- The Dark Tower (1943)
- They Met in the Dark (1943)
- The Night Invader (1943)
- Candlelight in Algeria (1943)
- Gaiety George (1946)
- Night Boat to Dublin (1946)
- They Made Me a Fugitive (1947)
- Temptation Harbour (1947)
- Bond Street (1948)
- Golden Arrow (1949)
- The Queen of Spades (1949)
- The Woman with No Name (1950)
- I'll Get You for This (1951)
- The Crimson Pirate (1952)
- The Man Who Watched Trains Go By (1952)
- The Rainbow Jacket (1954)
- The Divided Heart (1954)
- The Ladykillers (1955)
- Richard III (1955)
- The Vicious Circle (1957)
- The Silent Enemy (1958)
- Peeping Tom (1960)
- Victim (1961)
- Light in the Piazza (1962)
- West 11 (1963)
- The Curse of the Mummy's Tomb (1964)
- Woman of Straw (1964)
- The Ipcress File (1965)
- Masquerade (1965)
- That Riviera Touch (1966)
- Alfie (1966)
- Funeral in Berlin (1966)
- Billion Dollar Brain (1967)
- I'll Never Forget What's 'Isname (1967)
- Duffy (1968)
- Can Heironymus Merkin Ever Forget Mercy Humppe and Find True Happiness? (1969)
- Bloomfield (1971)
