= Okoř =

- Municipality
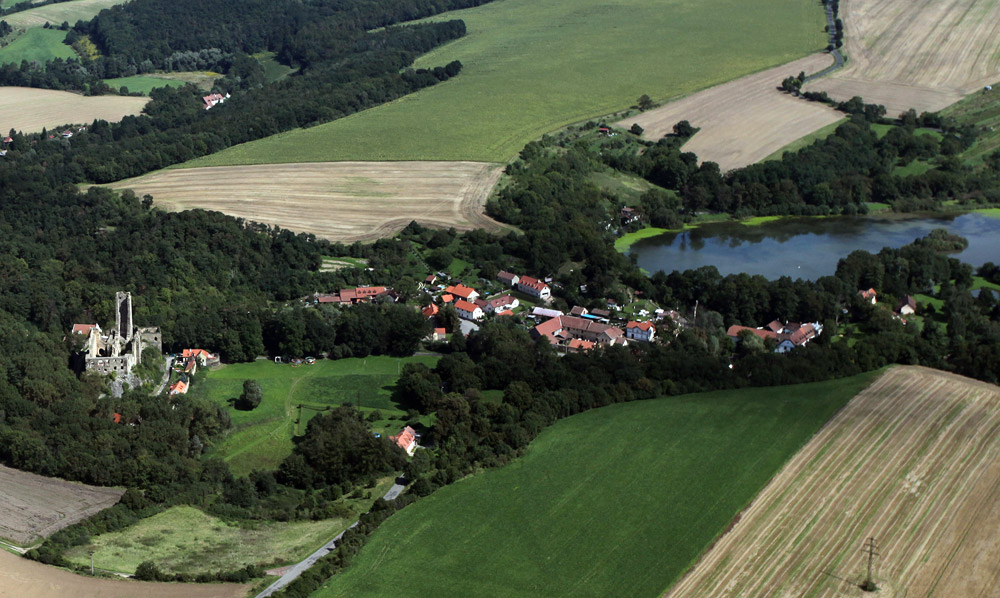
- Aerial view

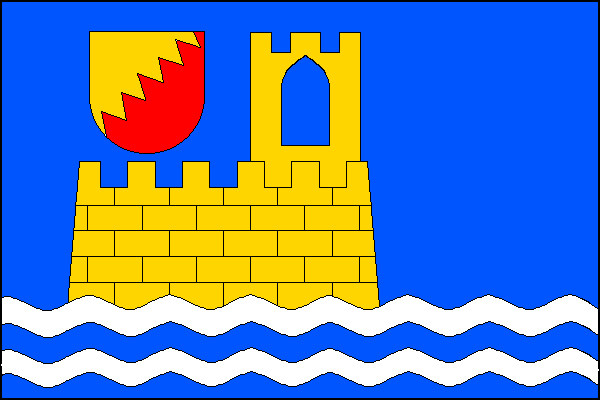
- Flag Coat of arms

- Location in the Czech Republic
- Coordinates: 50°9′43″N 14°15′31″E
- Country: Czech Republic
- Region: Central Bohemian
- District: Prague-West
- First mentioned: 1227

Area
  - Total: 2.14 km^{2} (0.83 sq mi)
- Elevation: 275 m (902 ft)

Population (2026-01-01)
  - Total: 112
  - Density: 52.3/km^{2} (136/sq mi)
- Time zone: UTC+1 (CET)
  - Summer (DST): UTC+2 (CEST)
- Postal code: 252 64
- Website: www.obecokor.cz

Okoř is a municipality and village in Prague-West District in the Central Bohemian Region of the Czech Republic. It has about 100 inhabitants. It is known for the Okoř Castle.

== Etymology ==
The name is derived from the personal name Okora.

== Geography ==
Okoř is located about 11 kilometres (7 mi) northwest of Prague. It lies in an agricultural landscape in the Prague Plateau. The stream Zákolanský potok flows through the municipality.

== History ==
The first written mention of Okoř is in a deed of King Ottokar I from 1227.

== Demographics ==
Historical population

Year	Pop.	±%
1869	170	—
1880	213	+25.3%
1890	182	−14.6%
1900	182	+0.0%
1910	169	−7.1%

Year	Pop.	±%
1921	133	−21.3%
1930	169	+27.1%
1950	101	−40.2%
1961	83	−17.8%
1970	72	−13.3%

Year	Pop.	±%
1980	49	−31.9%
1991	32	−34.7%
2001	51	+59.4%
2011	86	+68.6%
2021	108	+25.6%

Source: Censuses

== Transport ==
There are no railways or major roads passing through the municipality.

== Sights ==
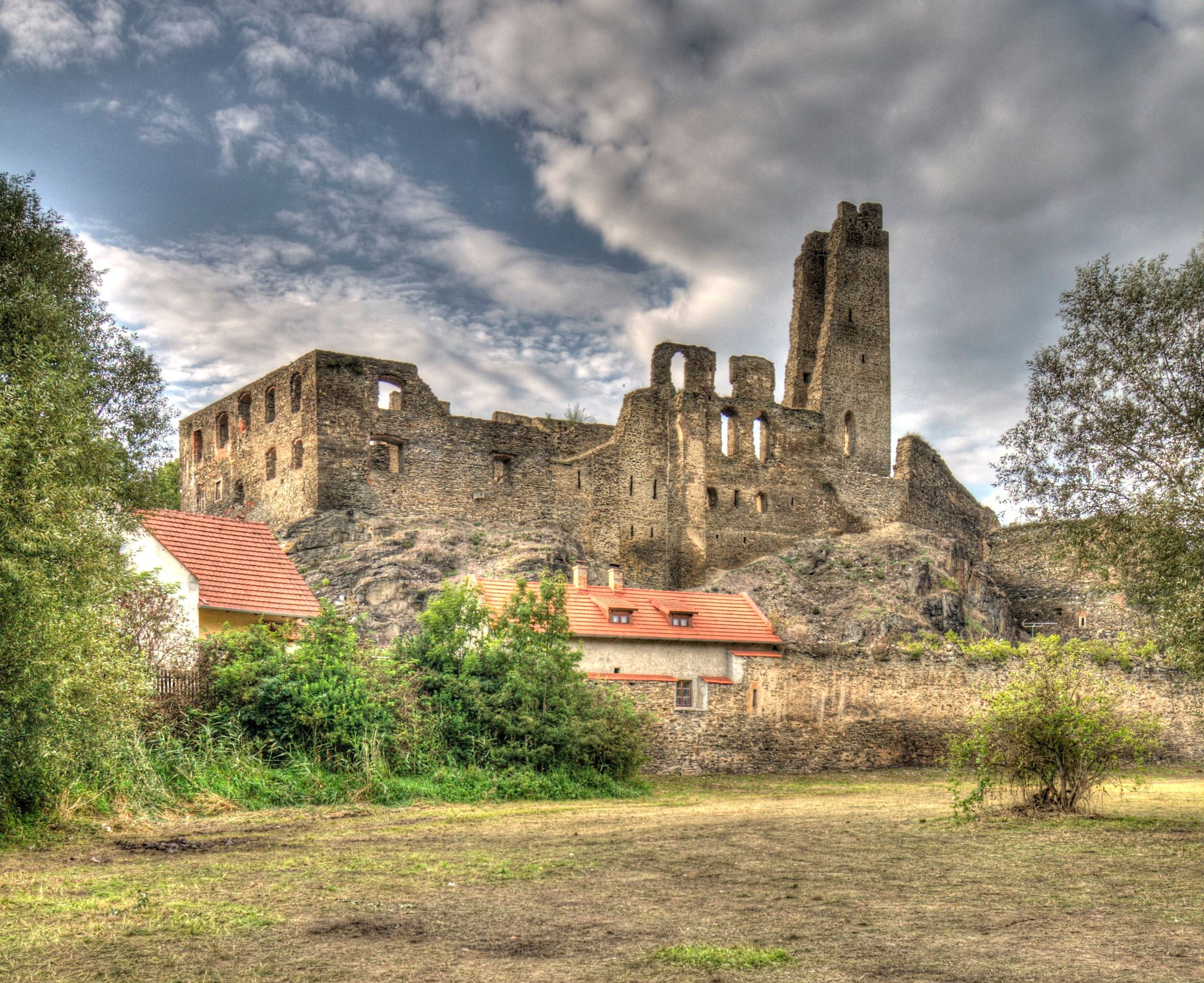
Okoř Castle

The main landmark of Okoř is the ruin of the large medieval Okoř Castle. It was gradually built from the 13th to the 15th century. During the Thirty Years' War, the castle became a ruin. The last construction modifications took place in the 18th century. Today the castle is a popular tourist destination. In the summer season, various cultural events are held here.
