= Little Red Riding Hood (1920 film) =

1920 film

- Directed by: Svatopluk Innemann
- Written by: Antonín Šíma; Jaro Kruis
- Based on: Little Red Riding Hood by Charles Perrault and by Brothers Grimm
- Starring: Zdena Kavková
- Cinematography: Svatopluk Innemann
- Release date: 21 January 1920
- Running time: 46 minutes
- Country: Czechoslovakia
- Languages: Silent; Czech intertitles

Little Red Riding Hood (Czech: Červená karkulka) is a 1920 Czechoslovak drama film directed by Svatopluk Innemann.

== Cast ==
- Ludmila Innemannová as Grandmother
- Zdena Kavková as Karkulka Podhorská
- Josef Zora as Father
- Arnošta Záhoříková as Mother
- František Beranský as Jirka
- Josef Rovenský as Wizard
- Karel Noll as Night watch Vrána
- Eman Fiala as Cobbler Smůla
- Karel Hruška as Tailor Nitka
- Antonín Frič as Reeve
- Jan W. Speerger as Forester Dubský
