= Okoř Castle =

Castle in the Czech Republic

Coordinates: 50°9′50.9″N 14°15′19.4″E

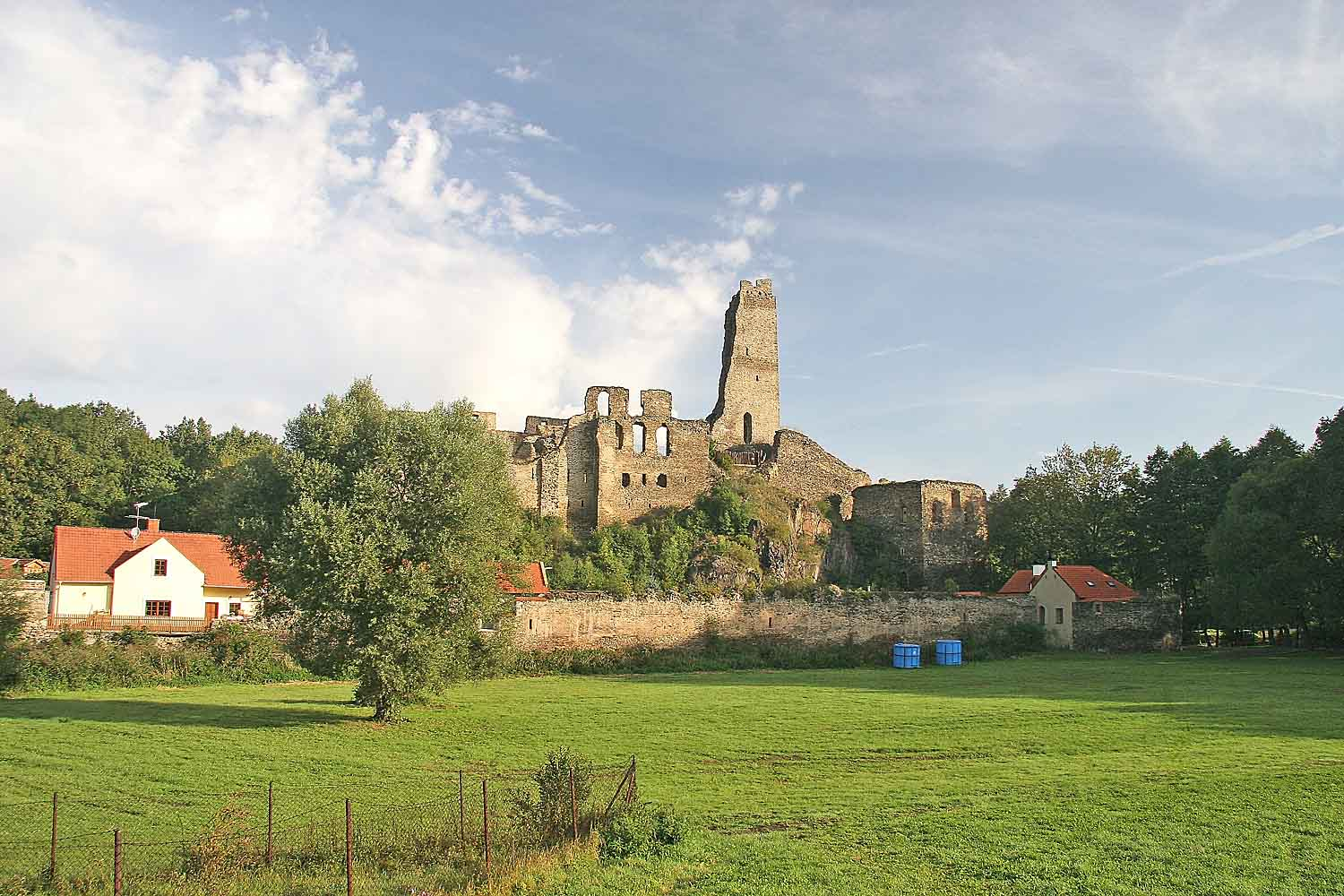
Ruins of Okoř Castle, district Praha-západ

Okoř is a castle on a low rocky promontory in Okoř, north-west of Prague, about 15 kilometres (9 mi) from the city centre, in the Central Bohemian Region of the Czech Republic.

In 1228 a stronghold was built in the small hamlet of Okoř. It was later modified into a Gothic castle, founded in 1359 by Frantisek Rokyčansky, a wealthy burgher of Prague's Old Town. It was later modified by comprehensive Late Gothic remodelling by the Lords of Donin. In 1518, during the reign of Bořitas of Martinice, the castle was turned into a residence in the Renaissance style.

During the Thirty Years' War the castle was heavily damaged and then restored in the Baroque style. It underwent further extension in the second half of the 15th century, and in the 17th century it was owned by Jesuits. Following their departure after the Jesuit order was discontinued in Bohemia, the Okoř castle became deserted in the late 18th century and slowly began to deteriorate.
