= Never the Twain (film) =

1926 film

- Directed by: Karel Lamač
- Written by: František Langer (play and screenplay); Karel Lamač
- Starring: Jan W. Speerger; Betty Kysilková; Anny Ondra
- Cinematography: Karl Degl
- Production company: Bratri Deglové
- Release date: 12 November 1926
- Country: Czechoslovakia
- Languages: Silent; Czech intertitles

Never the Twain (Czech: Velbloud uchem jehly) is a 1926 Czech silent comedy film directed by Karel Lamač and starring Jan W. Speerger, Betty Kysilková and Anny Ondra. It is based on the 1923 František Langer play Velbloud uchem jehly. The son of a wealthy industrialist marries the daughter of a beggar.

The film's sets were designed by the art director Artur Berger.

== Cast ==
- Jan W. Speerger as Pesta
- Betty Kysilková as Pestová
- Anny Ondra as Zuzka Pestová / Lili Weberová
- Theodor Pištěk as Dairy Shop Customer
- Karel Lamač as Alík Vilím
- Hugo Thimig as Joe Vilím
- Ela Lausmanová as Weberová
- Čeněk Šlégl as Berka
- František Havel as Andrejs
- Karl Noll as Bezchyba
- Joe Lars as Butler
- Oldřich Nový as Butler

== Bibliography ==
- Bock, Hans-Michael & Bergfelder, Tim. The Concise CineGraph. Encyclopedia of German Cinema. Berghahn Books, 2009.
