= The Mysterious Beauty =

1922 film

- Directed by: Přemysl Pražský
- Written by: Přemysl Pražský
- Cinematography: Otto Luňák
- Production company: Lloydfilm
- Distributed by: Lloydfilm
- Release date: 1922
- Country: Czechoslovakia
- Language: Silent

The Mysterious Beauty (Czech: Neznámá kráska) is a 1922 Czechoslovak comedy film directed by Přemysl Pražský. The film was shot in Brno and had a premiere there a month later.

== Cast ==
- Vladimír Marek as Jaroslav Smola
- Věra Skalská as Milada Smolová
- Oldřich Nový as Petr Stamati
- Jan Purkrábek as Ferdinand Veselý
- Katy Fibingerová as Ludmila Veselá
- Heda Marková as Máňa Vacková
- Josef Žídek as Theodor Straka
- Vlasta Bubelová as Straka's Wife
- Přemysl Pražský as Director at Lloydfilm
