= Christian (1939 film) =

1939 Czech comedy film

- Czech poster
- Directed by: Martin Frič
- Written by: Eduard Šimáček; Josef Gruss
- Produced by: Jan Sinnreich
- Starring: Oldřich Nový
- Cinematography: Ferdinand Pečenka
- Edited by: Jan Kohout
- Music by: Sláva Eman Nováček
- Production company: AB
- Distributed by: Lucernafilm
- Release date: 8 September 1939
- Running time: 96 minutes
- Country: Protectorate of Bohemia and Moravia
- Language: Czech
- Budget: 675,000 Kčs

Christian (Czech: Kristián) is a 1939 Czechoslovak comedy film directed by Martin Frič. The film is based on a French play by Yvan Noé. It is in the style of American screwball comedies such as The Lady Eve and The Awful Truth.

== Plot ==
Alois Novák is an uninspired clerk married to Marie, living a dull and uneventful life while yearning for excitement and adventure. Once a month, he visits the Orient Bar in disguise as a wealthy traveler named Kristian, where he seduces elegant women before leaving them heartbroken. One day, he meets Zuzana, who quickly sees through his ruse and refuses to be fooled. Determined to confront him, she begins searching for him, leading to a series of comical situations. Eventually, she finds Novák and compels him to return to reality. In the end, Novák abandons his Kristian persona, emerging as a more confident individual and a more loving, attentive husband to his wife.

== Cast ==
- Oldřich Nový as Alois Novák alias Kristián
- Nataša Gollová as Marie Nováková
- Raoul Schránil as Fred
- Bedřich Veverka as Petr
- Adina Mandlová as Fred's fiancée Zuzana Rendlová
- Jára Kohout as Travel agent Josef Novotný
- Anna Steimarová as Marie's aunt
- Jaroslav Marvan as Travel agency manager Král
- Čeněk Šlégl as Dandy with a handkerchief
- Josef Belský as Manager of the "Orient" bar
- František Paul as Waiter Robert
- Jan W. Speerger as Barman

== Production ==
The film is based on a play by Yvan Noé. Shooting of the film took 23 days and cost 675,000 Kčs. The film premiered on 8 September 1939. In real life, the actresses who played Zuzana and Novák's wife were friends, and during World War II they competed for the affections of the producer Willy Söhnel.

== Release ==
The film premiered on 8 September 1939. It remained in cinemas for 5 weeks. The film was re-released in theatres in 1951, but all scenes featuring Jára Kohout were cut from the film, because he emigrated in 1948.

Oldřich Nový wanted to collaborate with Martin Frič on a sequel called Christian Returns. Nový even wrote a screenplay with his wife.
