= The Good Soldier Schweik (1926 film) =

1926 film

- Directed by: Karel Lamač
- Starring: Karel Noll
- Release date: 12 February 1926
- Country: Czechoslovakia
- Language: Czech

The Good Soldier Schweik (Czech: Dobrý voják Švejk) is a 1926 Czech black-and-white silent era comedy film directed by Karel Lamač, based on Jaroslav Hašek's novel The Good Soldier Švejk. The first of the Czech films starring Karel Noll, as the Good Soldier Švejk. Of these, it was the most closely based on the original, unfinished novel. Subsequent films continued the original story.

== Cast ==
- Karel Noll as Josef Švejk
- Antonie Nedošinská as Mrs. Müllerová
- Karel Lamač as Innkeeper Palivec / Lt. Lukáš
- Jan W. Speerger as Bretschneider
- Betty Kysilková as Mrs. Palivcová

== Sequels ==
- Schweik at the Front (1926)
- Schweik in Russian Captivity (1926)
- Schweik in Civilian Life (1927)

A 76-minute cut of the first 3 films edited by Martin Frič, was released as The Fates of the Good Soldier Švejk in 1930.
