= Nikyho velebné dobrodružství =

1920 film

- Directed by: Evzen Nicolsen
- Release date: 1920
- Country: Czechoslovakia
- Language: Silent

Nikyho velebné dobrodružství is a 1920 Czechoslovak comedy film directed by Evzen Nicolsen.

== Cast ==
- Anny Ondra
- Jan Zelenka ... Priest
