= The Kreutzer Sonata (1927 film) =

1927 film

- Directed by: Gustav Machatý
- Written by: Gustav Machatý; Leo Tolstoy (story)
- Starring: Eva Byronová; Jan W. Speerger
- Cinematography: Otto Heller
- Production company: Julius Schmitt
- Distributed by: Julius Schmitt
- Release date: 25 February 1927
- Running time: 69 minutes
- Country: Czechoslovakia
- Languages: Silent; Czech intertitles

The Kreutzer Sonata (Czech: Kreutzerova sonáta) is a 1927 Czech silent drama film directed by Gustav Machatý. It is based on the 1889 novella of the same name by Leo Tolstoy. The film's art direction was by Vilém Rittershain.

== Cast ==
- Eva Byronová as Nataša Pozdnyševová
- Jan W. Speerger as Pozdnyšev
- Miroslav Paul as Truchačevský
- Božena Svobodová as Nataša's Mother
- Saša Dobrovolná as Nanny
- Alfred Schlesinger as Physician
- Václav Žichovský as Concert attendant
- Rudolf Stahl as Nataša's dancing partner
- Ladislav Desenský as Concert attendant
- Máňa Ženíšková as Young Girl in the Concert
