= Schweik in Civilian Life =

1927 film

- Directed by: Gustav Machatý
- Written by: Jacques Bachrach; Eduard Šimáček
- Starring: Karel Noll; Dina Gralla; Albert Paulig
- Cinematography: Viktor Gluck
- Production companies: Elektafilm; Hugo Engel-Filmgesellschaft
- Distributed by: Elektafilm
- Release date: 23 September 1927
- Running time: 90 minutes
- Countries: Czechoslovakia; Austria
- Languages: Silent; Czech intertitles

Schweik in Civilian Life (Czech: Švejk v civilu) is a 1927 Czech-Austrian silent comedy film directed by Gustav Machatý and starring Karel Noll, Dina Gralla and Albert Paulig. It is a sequel to the 1926 film The Good Soldier Schweik.

The film's sets were designed by the art directors Vilém Rittershain, Hans Ledersteger and Alois Mecera. Location shooting took place in Vienna, Karlovy Vary and Prague.

== Cast ==
- Karel Noll as Josef Švejk
- Dina Gralla as Anička, Foster-child
- Jiří Hron as Pavel
- Albert Paulig as Baron Camra
- Renati Renée as Dancer Lo
- Jan Richter as Žížala
- Josef Rovenský as Pižla
- Robert Ford as Hotel Manager
- Jindřich Fiala as Referee

== Bibliography ==
- Taylor, Richard. The BFI companion to Eastern European and Russian cinema. BFI, 2000.
