= Gilly in Prague for the First Time =

1920 film

- Directed by: Karel Lamač
- Written by: Karel Lamač
- Starring: Václav Pražský; Anny Ondra; Karel Lamač
- Cinematography: Josef Brabec
- Release date: 5 May 1920
- Country: Czechoslovakia
- Language: Silent

Gilly in Prague for the First Time (Czech: Gilly poprvé v Praze) is a 1920 Czechoslovak comedy film directed by Karel Lamač.

== Cast ==
- Václav Pražský as Gilly
- Anny Ondra as Girl (as Anny Ondráková)
- Karel Lamač as Uncle Hron
