= František Langer =

Czech playwright and screenwriter

Brigade General František Langer
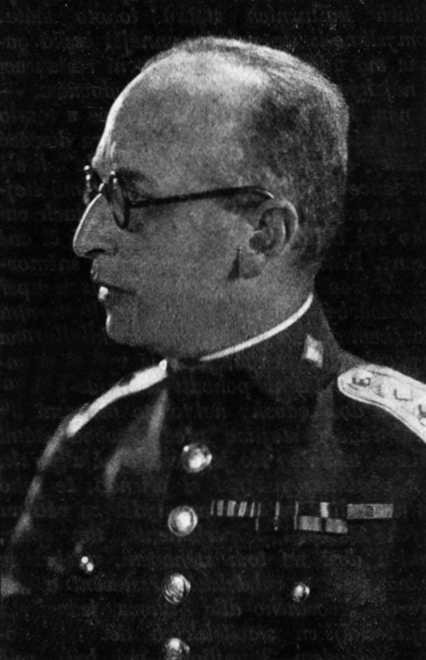
- František Langer, cca 1928
- Born: 3 March 1888; Prague, Bohemia, Austria-Hungary (now Czech Republic)
- Died: 2 August 1965 (aged 77); Prague, Czechoslovakia
- Education: Charles University
- Occupations: Writer, Physician

František Langer (3 March 1888 – 2 August 1965) was a Czech playwright, screenwriter, essayist, literary critic, publicist and military physician.

== Life ==
=== Early life ===
He was born to the secular Jewish family of Maximilian Langer (*1861) and his wife Růžena, née Taussig (1851-1932), in Prague. He was the eldest of three sons, his brother Josef was four and Jiří six years younger. Their ancestor came to Bohemia in the mid-17th century as a court Jew (a Jewish financier who managed the finances of the nobility), brought by Cardinal Franz von Dietrichstein to his ironworks in Staré Ransko.

In 1906, František graduated from the Gymnasium in Londýnská Street and began to study at the Faculty of Medicine of Charles University. At this time he became friends with Jaroslav Hašek, and later they wrote and performed together the play Pogrom na Křesťany v Jeruzalémě. In 1911 Langer joined Hašek's satirical political party, the Party of Moderate Progress within the Limits of the Law.

In 1912-1914 he edited Umělecký měsíčník, the newspaper of Skupina výtvarných umělců, a group of artists of which he was a member.

=== World War I ===
Shortly after graduation, Langer was drafted into the Austro-Hungarian Army and assigned as a lieutenant of the medical service to the Hucul Guard Regiment. Subsequently, his regiment was sent to Russia, where Langer spent almost a year on the Galician front and participated in the Vistula River offensive. During the fighting at the Bug River, Langer was hit by an enemy bullet in the back and sent to Vienna for treatment.

After his recovery he returned to the front, but in July 1916 he fell in Russian captivity. Langer was first transported to Kyiv and then to Tsaritsyn, where his medical experience earned him a position as a physician in a POW hospital. Here, he cared for patients of many nationalities and was sceptical of the activities of the emerging Czech Company for the time being. His view only changed after the February Revolution in 1917. In addition to his medical practice, he wrote for Legionary magazines and took care of cultural activities.

Langer joined the Czechoslovak Legion and was appointed chief physician of the 1st Rifle Regiment. In this capacity he took part in the Battle of Zborov and then in the Siberian Anabasis, when the Legions had to make a lengthy return to their homeland across Siberia. After Langer and the other legionnaires arrived in Vladivostok, they headed back to Prague via Japan, China and India, arriving there in 1920.

Although Langer served as an army medic, he was decorated several times for his service and attained the rank of major. For his services he received the Czechoslovak War Cross 1918, the Czechoslovak Revolutionary Medal, and twice the Order of the Sokol. In Russia, Langer married Maria Moyseva in 1918.

=== Later life ===
In 1935-1938 he worked as a dramatic adviser in Vinohrady Theatre and as the commander of a Prague military hospital. He spent World War II in England as a brigade general of the Czechoslovak army abroad.

His younger brother was the Hebrew poet and scholar Jiří Langer.

== Work ==
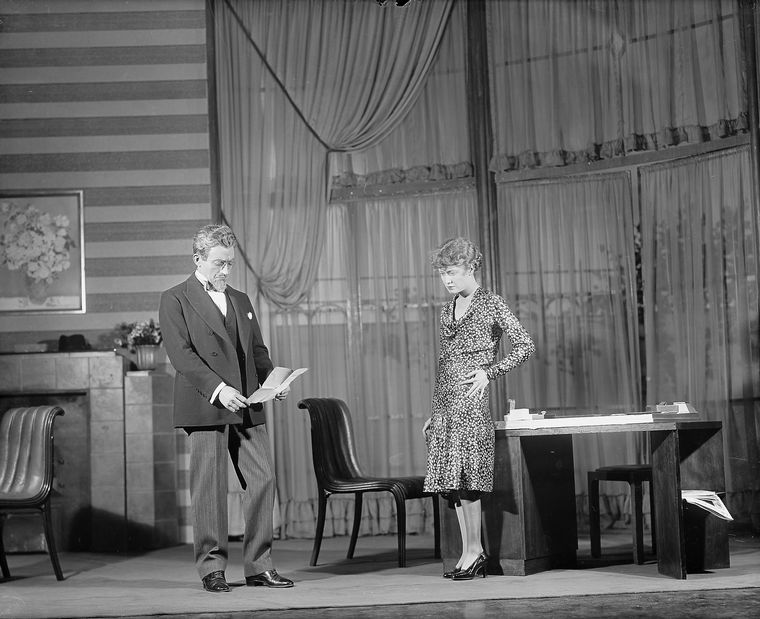
Claude Rains and Mary Kennedy in the Theatre Guild's Broadway production of The Camel Through the Needle's Eye (1929)

The main focus of Langer's work is in drama:

- Velbloud uchem jehly (aka The Camel through the Needle's Eye) (1923)
- Periférie (aka The Outskirts) (1925)
- Grandhotel Nevada (1927)
- Obrácení Ferdyše Pištory (The Conversion of Ferdyš Pištora, 1929)
- Jízdní hlídka (aka The Cavalry Watch) (1935)
- Dvaasedmdesátka (1937)
- Děti a dýka (The Kids and the Dagger, 1942)
- Pražské legendy (Prague Legends, 1956)
- Železný vlk (The Iron Wolf, 1923) - short stories

== Orders, decorations and medals ==
- Order of Tomáš Garrigue Masaryk, II. Class, 1995 in memoriam
- Czechoslovak War Cross 1918
- Czechoslovak War Cross 1939-1945
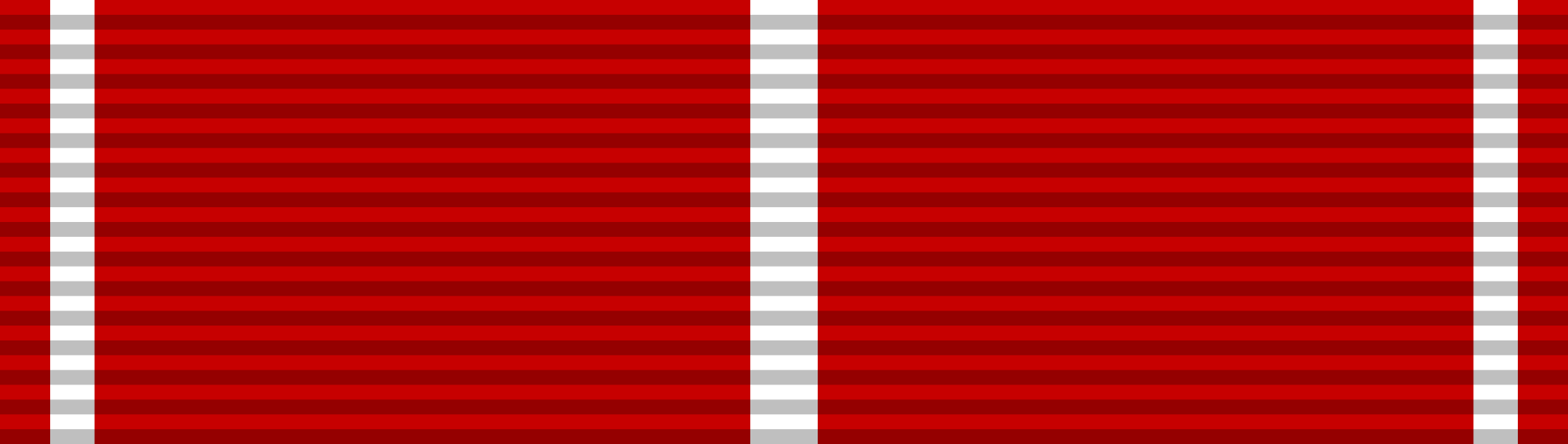
- Czechoslovak Order of the Hawk with swords
- Czechoslovak Order of the Hawk with a star
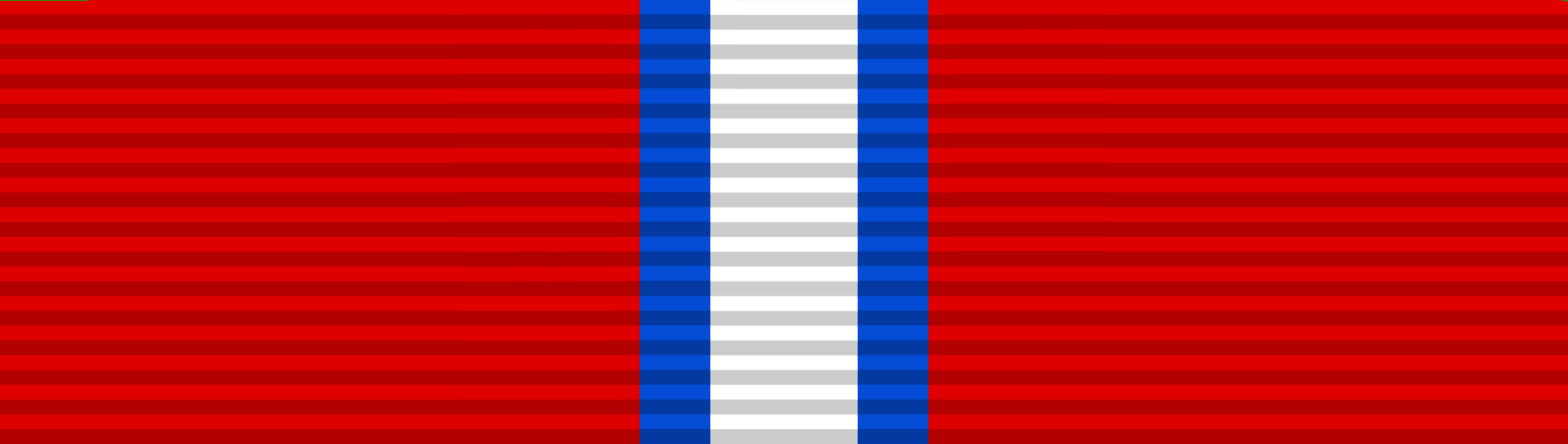
- Czechoslovak Revolutionary Medal
- Victory Medal
- Czechoslovak Medal for Merit 1st Class
- Commemorative Medal of Czechoslovak Army Abroad
- Croix de Guerre 1939–1945
