= The Cross by the Brook =

1921 film

- Kříž u potoka
- Directed by: Jan S. Kolár
- Written by: Jan S. Kolár
- Based on: Kříž u potoka by Karolina Světlá
- Starring: Přemysl Pražský; Rudolf Myzet
- Cinematography: Otto Heller
- Production company: AB
- Distributed by: American
- Release date: 1921
- Running time: 36 minutes
- Country: Czechoslovakia
- Language: Silent

The Cross by the Brook (Czech: Kříž u potoka) is a 1921 Czechoslovak silent drama film directed by Jan S. Kolár based on Based on the novel by Karolina Světlá.

== Cast ==
- Přemysl Pražský as Mikeš Potocký
- Rudolf Myzet as Franík Potocký
- Karel Noll as Kobosil
- Kamila Maroldová as Józa
- Emil Focht as Dolanský
- Růžena Maturová as Dolanská
- Natasa Cyganková as Evička
- Theodor Pištěk as Ambrož Potocký
- Hugo Svoboda as Štepán Potocký
- František Beranský as Hovorka
- Alois Sedláček as Oldest Town Councillor
- Vojtech Záhořík as Taverner
- Arnoštka Záhoříková as Maid
- Bronislava Livia as Marička Holá
- Josef Šváb-Malostranský as Rich farmer
