= Gustav Machatý =

Czech film director (1901–1963)

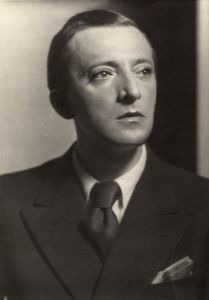
- Born: Augustín Otokar Jan Machatý; 9 May 1901; Prague, Austria-Hungary
- Died: 13 December 1963 (aged 62); Munich, West Germany
- Occupations: Film director, screenwriter
- Years active: 1919–1955
- Spouses: Maria Ray (m. 1937; died 1951) Helga Marlo (m. 1951)

Gustav Machatý (9 May 1901 – 13 December 1963) was a Czech film director, screenwriter and actor. He directed films in Czechoslovakia, the United States, and Germany, including Erotikon and Ecstasy.

== Life ==
He was born Augustín Otokar Jan Machatý in Prague. His father was a real estate investor. Machatý didn't finish high school and started to work in movies as a teenager. He worked as a cinema pianist, actor, screenwriter, producer and art director.

He directed his first film Teddy by kouřil in 1919. In 1920 he moved to the US, worked for Universal Pictures and returned to Czechoslovakia in 1922. In 1926 he finally managed to secure funds for his movie The Kreutzer Sonata. The film was a success and led to Machatý getting offers to direct. His next movie Schweik in Civilian Life was not successful. Machatý spent two years studying foreign movies and entered the period in which he created the best movies of his career. In 1929 he made a symbolist drama Erotikon, in 1931 a social drama From Saturday to Sunday and an adaptation of Karel Poláček's novel Načeradec, král kibiců and in 1933 his best known film Ecstasy.

Ecstasy was screened at the Venice Film Festival and made both Machatý and its lead actress Hedy Lamarr internationally famous. They both received offers to work for Metro-Goldwyn-Mayer. After making Nocturno in Germany and Ballerine in Italy he decided to accept the offer and traveled to the US. However his American career consisted mainly of low-level contract work for the studio and MGM producers didn't show interest in his ideas. From 1940 to 1943 he worked for RKO directing only camera test footage with starting actors. In 1945 he managed to direct Jealousy for a smaller production company Republic Pictures.

After the suicide of his wife Maria Ray (1904–1951) he returned to Europe and settled in Munich, West Germany. He directed his last movie in 1955 and later worked as a professor at Deutsches Institut für Film und Fernsehen in Münich. He died in Münich in 1963.

== Selected filmography ==
Year	Title	Actor	Director	Screenwriter	Notes
1919	Akord smrti	Yes	No	No	
1919	Teddy by kouřil	Yes	Yes	Yes	Short film
1919	Lady with the Small Foot	Yes	No	Yes	
1927	The Kreutzer Sonata	No	Yes	Yes	
1927	Schweik in Civilian Life	No	Yes	No	
1929	Erotikon	No	Yes	Yes	
1931	From Saturday to Sunday	No	Yes	Yes	
1931	Načeradec, král kibiců	No	Yes	Yes	
1933	Ecstasy	No	Yes	Yes	Won Best Director in 2nd Venice Film Festival
1934	Nocturno	Yes	Yes	No	
1936	Ballerine	No	Yes	No	
1937	The Good Earth	No	Yes	No	Uncredited
1937	Madame X	No	Yes	No	Uncredited
1937	Conquest	No	Yes	No	Uncredited
1938	The Wrong Way Out	No	Yes	No	Short film
1939	Within the Law	No	Yes	No	
1945	Jealousy	No	Yes	No	
1955	Es geschah am 20. Juli	No	No	Yes	
1955	Lost Child 312	No	Yes	No	
