= The Countess from Podskalí =

1926 film

- Directed by: Karel Lamač; Theodor Pištěk
- Written by: Karel Lamač
- Based on: Hraběnka z Podskalí by Alois Koldinský
- Starring: Theodor Pištěk; Anny Ondra; Karel Lamač
- Cinematography: Otto Heller
- Production companies: Bratři Deglové; Elpe
- Distributed by: Kinema
- Release date: 5 March 1926
- Running time: 83 minutes
- Country: Czechoslovakia
- Languages: Silent with Czech intertitles

The Countess from Podskalí (Czech: Hraběnka z Podskalí) is a 1926 Czechoslovak comedy film directed by Karel Lamač. The film is considered lost.

== Cast ==
- Theodor Pištěk as Innkeeper Štětina
- Anny Ondra as Liduška (as Anny Ondráková)
- Vladimír Majer as Joza
- Karel Lamač as Count Viktor of Renné
- Jan W. Speerger as Photographer Lambert
- Mary Jansová as Anna Salfická
- Ferdinand Kaňkovský as Music teacher Lukáš
- Ladislav Desenský as Fiala
- Emilie Nitschová as Countess Eleonora of Renné
- Oldřich Speerger as Child
- Přemysl Pražský
- Adolf Branald (as Karel Branald)
- Jaroslav Vojta
