= Svatopluk Innemann =

- Born: 18 February 1896; Ljubljana, Austria-Hungary
- Died: 30 October 1945 (aged 49); Klecany, Czechoslovakia
- Occupations: Film director Cinematographer; Film editor Screenwriter; Actor
- Years active: 1918–1937

Svatopluk Innemann (18 February 1896 – 30 October 1945) was a Czech film director, cinematographer, screenwriter, film editor and actor. He was one of the pioneers of Czech cinema.

== Biography and works ==
Innemann, was a son of the Czech director Rudolf Innemann and opera singer Ludmila Lvová-Innemannová. He was born in Slovenia during their engagement, but was raised in Prague, where he studied to be a pork butcher. Around 1918 he became interested in film, and began to work as a camera operator. As cameraman, he co-created his first film with Otto Heller. From 1919 he worked independently.

Innemann's early career was varied; he was involved in operettas, comedies and melodramas, short films and documentaries, often as cameraman. He made his directorial debut in silent films with the fairy-tale Little Red Riding-hood in 1920. In 1925 he directed the popular comedy From the Czech Mills and made a biographical film about Josef Kajetán Tyl, an important personality of the Czech National Revival. In 1927 he directed The Lovers of an Old Criminal, starring the Czech actor Vlasta Burian. He directed a total of 16 silent films: in 1931 he directed his first sound film, Poslední bohém (The Last Bohemian), about the Czech writer Jaroslav Hašek, and made the popular comedy Muži v offsidu (Men in Offside) with Hugo Haas in the title role. It remains popular in the Czech Republic.

The 1932 film Před maturitou, made in cooperation with the Czech writer Vladislav Vančura, is considered Innemann's second creative peak. In 1933, he directed the crime film Vražda v Ostrovní ulici, the first film to be made in the Barrandov Studios. His film career ended in 1937 with Švanda dudák, based on a theme by Josef Kajetán Tyl. Later, during the German occupation of Czechoslovakia, he intended to perform his own play with very controversial topic (he tried to portray German leader Adolf Hitler), but from 1940 had to undergo treatments for a mental disorder. He was one of the very few Czech filmmakers who claimed German citizenship during the Protectorate of Bohemia and Moravia. During World War II, Innemann cooperated with the ambitious Czech director and Nazi collaborator Václav Binovec. At the war's end, Innemann's wartime activities were investigated. He died on 30 October 1945 at his home in Klecany, near Prague, with the investigation incomplete.

== Filmography ==
=== Director ===
- Little Red Riding Hood (1920)
- Zelený automobil (1921)
- Komptoiristka (1922)
- Venoušek a Stázička (1922)
- Buď připraven (1925)
- From the Czech Mills (1925)
- Josef Kajetán Tyl (1925)
- Švejk v ruském zajetí (1926)
- Lásky Kačenky Strnadové (1926)
- Falešná kočička (1926)
- The Lovers of an Old Criminal (1927)
- Prague at Night (1927)
- Ve dvou se to lépe táhne (1928)
- Neviňátka (1929)
- Plukovník Švec (1929) - director
- Tchán Kondelík a zeť Vejvara (1929)
- Fidlovačka (1930)
- Muži v offsidu (1931)
- Třetí rota (1931)
- Karel Havlíček Borovský (1931)
- Poslední bohém (1931)
- Psohlavci (1931)
- Malostranští mušketýři (1932)
- Sňatková kancelář (1932)
- Před maturitou (1932)
- Písničkář (1932)
- Šenkýřka "U divoké krásy" (1932)
- Drž je! (1933)
- Vůně domova (1933)
- Prodaná nevěsta (1933)
- Skřivánčí píseň (1933)
- Vražda v Ostrovní ulici (1933)
- U Svatého Antoníčka (1933)
- Hudba srdci (1934)
- Z bláta do louže (1934)
- Tři kroky od těla (1934)
- Sextánka (1936)
- Arme kleine Inge (1936)
- Tvoje srdce inkognito (1936)
- Bílý cíl (1937)
- Švanda Dudák (1937)

=== Cinematographer ===
- Československý Ježíšek (1918)
- Aloisův los (1918)
- Akord smrti (1919)
- Láska je utrpením (1919)
- Divoká Marina (1919)
- Boby nesmí kouřit (1919)
- Utrpením ke slávě (1919)
- Dáma s malou nožkou (1919)
- Vzteklý ženich (1919)
- Zlatá žena (1920
- Šílený lékař (1920)
- Sněženky (1920)
- Za svobodu národa (1920)
- Za čest vítězů (1920)
- Magdalena (1920)
- Děvče ze stříbrné hranice (1921)
- Jak Vašíček přišel k nohám (1921)
- Závěť podivínova (1923)
- Lešetínský kovář (1924)
- The Lantern (1925)
- Okovy (1925)

=== Actor ===
- Byl první máj (1919)
- Dáma s malou nožkou (1919)
