= Přemysl Pražský =

Czech film director and actor

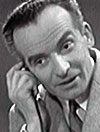
- Pražský in Him and His Sister, 1931
- Born: 24 July 1893; Nýřany, Bohemia, Austria-Hungary
- Died: 1 August 1964 (aged 71); Prague, Czechoslovakia
- Occupations: Film director Film actor Screenwriter

Přemysl Pražský was an early Czech film director, film actor, screenwriter and radio producer. He directed and appeared in a number of films in Czechoslovakia in the 1920s and 1930s, directing comedy films such as Two Mothers (1921), The Mysterious Beauty (1922), The Countess from Podskalí (1926) and Prague Seamstresses (1929). He is best known for his adaptation of the Josef Hais Týnecký novel Battalion (1927). He often worked with Theodor Pištěk.

== Early life and career ==
Pražský was born on 24 July 1893 in Nýřany. He began his studies in 1910 and continued them until 1914. He moved to Prague and began to work in the theater. He became the director of the Švanda Theatre during this time and was a frequent guest at the Vinohrady Theatre. It wasn't until 1919 that he moved to filmmaking. He had a successful acting and directing career. His 1927 film Battalion was his biggest success. It has been considered one of the most important works in Czech silent cinema. However, after the release of Battalion, he fell into debt. He attempted to move into sound and made only one sound film Sedmá velmoc (1933) but the film flopped. He left film for a career in radio production in 1933. He was director of Czech Radio from 1933 to 1958. In 1957 he was awarded the Prague artist of Outstanding Merit prize.

== Personal life and death ==
Pražský married radio announcer Marie Magdalena Tomanová in 1942. He died on 1 August 1964 in Prague at the age of 71.

== Selected filmography ==
- Lady with the Small Foot (1920)
- Two Mothers (1921)
- The Mysterious Beauty (1922)
- White Paradise (1924)
- The Countess from Podskalí (1926)
- Battalion (1927)
- Prague Seamstresses (1929)
