= Karel Lamač =

Czech film director (1897–1952)

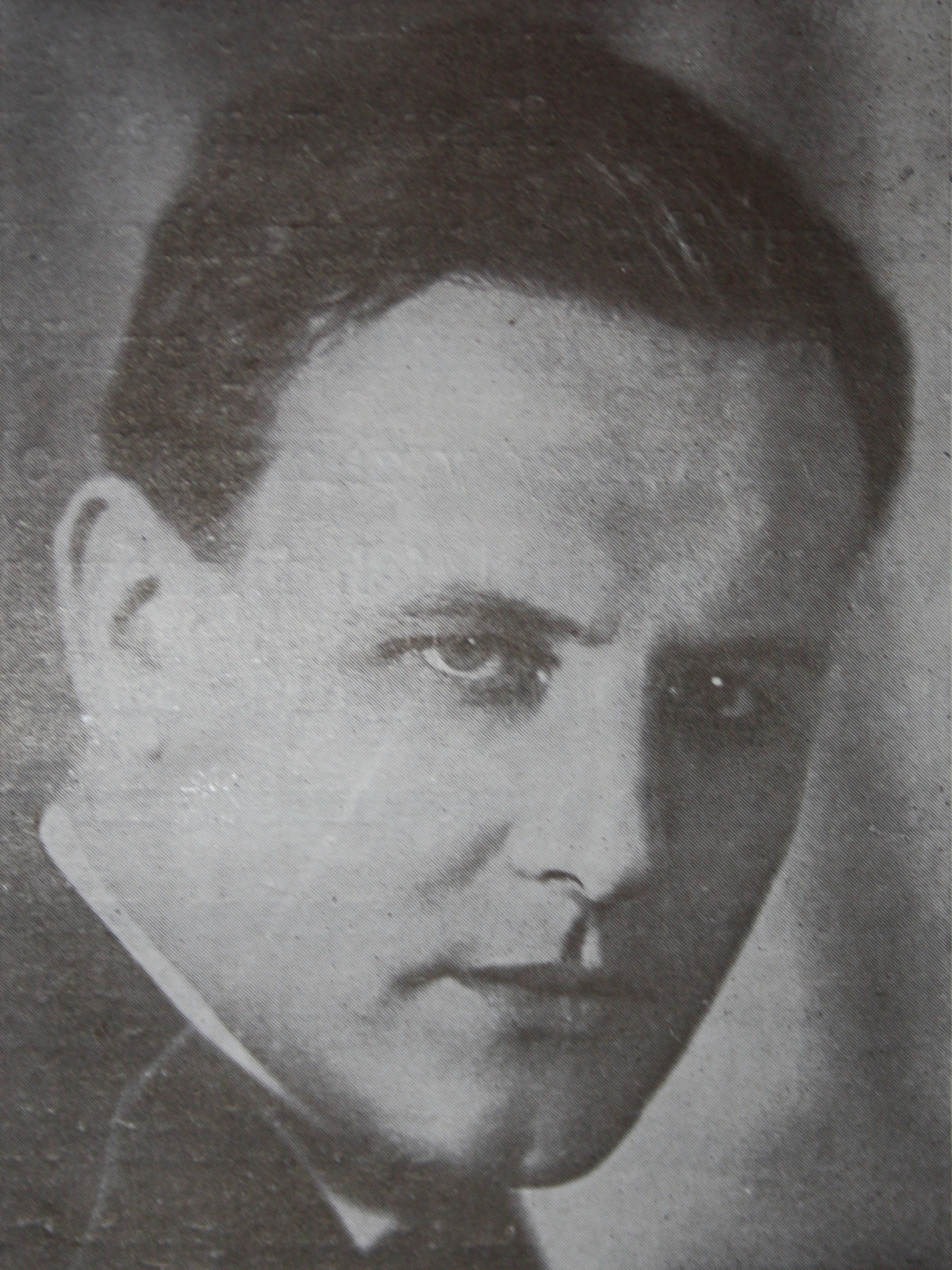
- Born: 27 January 1897; Prague, Bohemia, Austria-Hungary (now Czech Republic)
- Died: 2 August 1952 (aged 55); Hamburg, West Germany (now Germany)
- Other name: Carl Lamac
- Occupations: Film director, actor, screenwriter, film producer
- Years active: 1919–1952

Karel Lamač (27 January 1897 – 2 August 1952) was a Czech film director, actor, screenwriter, producer and singer. He directed more than 100 films in Czechoslovakia, Austria, Germany, the Netherlands and the United Kingdom.

== Life ==
Lamač was born 27 January 1897 in Prague, Austria-Hungary. His parents were Karel Lamač sr. (1863–1938), an opera singer and pharmacist, and Františka Lamačová (née Prusíková, 1860–1949). In his childhood Lamač was interested in pharmacy, electrical engineering, stage magic and acting. Before WWI he went to apprentice in camera manufacturer company Ernemann in Dresden. During the war he was a combat cameraman. After the war he became a technical director of film laboratory in Excelsiorfilm. He started working in movies in 1918, first as an actor, later as a writer and a director. Among his best movies of this period are crime drama The Poisoned Light, comedy Catch Him! and drama White Paradise. In 1923 he wrote a book, How to write a film libretto. His frequent collaborators were actress Anny Ondra, cinematographer Otto Heller and screenwriter Václav Wasserman. In 1926 he co-founded a film studio Kavalírka where he made his movies until it burned down in 1929.

In 1930 he founded a production company Ondra-Lamač Film with his then girlfriend Anny Ondra in Berlin. During 1930s he was making movies in Germany, Czechoslovakia, France and Austria. After the Nazi occupation of Czechoslovakia he left to Netherlands to make De Spooktrein and then to United Kingdom. He served in RAF until 1941. He made war documentaries and three feature movies during WWII. After the war he made two movies in France. In 1947 he went to the US, where he worked on technical innovations of color film and camera lenses. In 1951 he returned to Germany and directed his last film The Thief of Bagdad.

He died in Hamburg, West Germany, due to serious problems with his kidneys.

== Selected filmography ==
=== Director ===
Year	Title	Notes
1919	The Furious Bridegroom	Short film. Considered lost.
1919	Chord of Death	Considered lost.
1920	Gilly in Prague for the First Time	
1921	The Poisoned Light	
1923	The Lumberjack	
1924	White Paradise	
1925	Catch Him!	
1925	Karel Havlíček Borovský	Considered lost.
1925	The Lantern	
1926	The Countess from Podskalí	Considered lost.
1926	The Good Soldier Schweik	
1926	Schweik at the Front	
1926	Never the Twain	Considered lost.
1927	The Old Dad Bezoušek	
1927	A Flower of the Šumava Mountains	Considered lost.
1927	Sweet Josefine	Considered lost.
1928	Eve's Daughters	
1928	The First Kiss	
1928	Suzy Saxophone	
1928	Der erste Kuß	
1929	Sin	Considered lost.
1929	Sinful and Sweet	
1929	Sin of a Beautiful Woman	
1929	The Girl with the Whip	
1929	The Caviar Princess	
1930	Das Mädel aus U.S.A.	
1929	Fairground People	
1930	Imperial and Royal Field Marshal	
1930	K. und K. Feldmarschall	German version of Imperial and Royal Field Marshal
1930	Monsieur le maréchal	French version of Imperial and Royal Field Marshal
1930	Eine Freundin so goldig wie Du	
1931	Him and His Sister	
1931	Er und seine Schwester	German version of Him and His Sister
1931	The Squeaker	
1931	Business Under Distress	
1931	Die Fledermaus	
1931	Wehe, wenn er losgelassen	
1931	La Chauve-Souris	Co-directed with Pierre Billon
1932	Mamsell Nitouche	
1932	A Night in Paradise	
1932	Une nuit au paradis	
1932	Lelíček in the Services of Sherlock Holmes	
1932	The Undertaker	
1932	Die grausame Freundin	
1932	Faut-il les marier?	
1932	The Ringer	
1932	Kiki	
1932	Baby	
1933	Daughter of the Regiment	
1933	La fille du régiment	French version of Daughter of the Regiment
1933	Fräulein Hoffmanns Erzählungen	
1933	The Good Tramp Bernášek	
1933	Jindra, the Countess Ostrovín	
1933	The Love Hotel	
1933	Orchesterprobe	Short film
1934	So ein Theater!	Short film
1934	Der verhexte Scheinwerfer	
1934	The Switched Bride	Short film
1934	L'amour en cage	
1934	Karneval und Liebe	
1934	Little Dorrit	
1934	Frasquita	
1934	The Brenken Case	
1934	Polská krev	
1934	Polish Blood	German version of Polská krev
1934	Nezlobte dědečka	
1935	Knockout	
1935	Großreinemachen	
1935	I Love All the Women	
1935	J'aime toutes les femmes	French version of Ich liebe alle Frauen
1935	The White Horse Inn	
1935	The Young Count	
1936	The Postman from Longjumeau	
1936	The Bashful Casanova	
1936	Flitterwochen	
1936	On the Green Meadow	
1936	Where the Lark Sings	
1937	The Hound of the Baskervilles	
1937	A Girl from the Chorus	
1937	Vor Liebe wird gewarnt	
1937	Peter im Schnee	
1937	Grounds for Divorce	
1937	Cause for Divorce	German version of Důvod k rozvodu
1937	The Vagabonds	
1937	Pat und Patachon im Paradies	
1937	Florentine	
1938	Immer wenn ich glücklich bin..!	
1938	Forbidden Love	
1938	Frühlingsluft	
1938	Ducháček Will Fix It	
1938	The Lantern	
1938	Watch Out for the Ghosts	
1939	Place de la Concorde	
1939	Slávka, Don't Give In!	
1939	U pokladny stál...	
1939	De Spooktrein	
1940	Narcisse	
1943	Schweik's New Adventures	
1943	They Met in the Dark	
1944	It Happened One Sunday	
1947	La Colère des dieux	
1947	One Night at the Tabarin	
1952	The Thief of Bagdad	

=== Actor ===
- Gilly in Prague for the First Time (1920)
- The Poisoned Light (1921)
- The Arrival from the Darkness (1921)
- Look After Your Daughters (1922)
- Lead Us Not into Temptation (1922)
- Young Medardus (1923)
- Helena (1924)
- The Secret Agent (1924)
- White Paradise (1924)
- The Lantern (1925)
- Eve's Daughters (1928)

=== Producer ===
- The Double (1934)
