= Czech Film Archive =

Film archive in Prague, Czech Republic

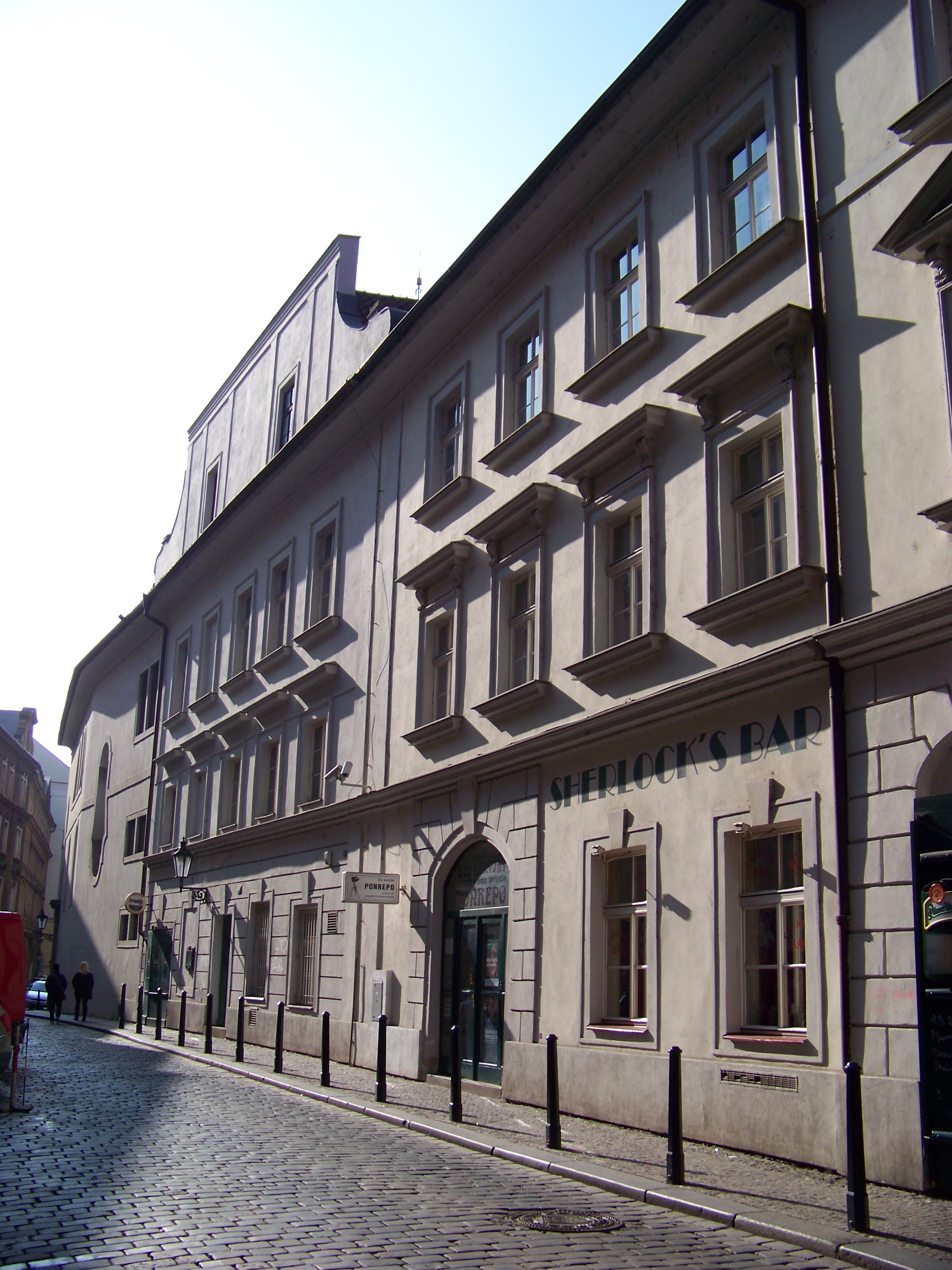
Czech Film Archive building with historical cinema Bio Konvikt

The National Film Archive (Czech: Národní filmový archiv, abb. NFA) is a film archive located in Prague, Czech Republic. It was established in 1943 (from 1943 to 1945 it was known as Filmový archiv, from 1945 to 1989 Československý filmový ústav, then from 1990 to 1992 Český filmový archiv) and in 1946 it became a member of the International Federation of Film Archives. In 1997 it became a founding member of the Association of European Film Archives and Cinematheques, ACE (Association des Cinémathèques Européenes).

== History ==
In the Czech Republic, the NFA is one of the major memory institutions; in addition to performing the archival role it manages Czech films and is engaged in scientific and publishing activities, exhibition and promotion of film heritage and support of contemporary Czech cinema. Since 2011, the NFA has been involved in major digitisation projects (Markéta Lazarová, The Firemen’s Ball, All My Compatriots, Closely Watched Trains, Voyage to the End of the Universe, Case for a Rookie Hangman, Adelheid and others.)

The NFA takes care of more than 150 million metres of film, more than 500,000 photos, over 30,000 posters, and 100,000 promotional materials. Archival collections and a film library serve professionals engaged in scientific research and are a source of information and materials for contemporary audio-visual production. In the years 1965–2008, the NFA preserved nearly 24 million metres of film copied from highly flammable stock. Czech Film Archive preserved last surviving copies of many films that were considered lost - Match de Prestidigitation (1904), La Chaussette (1905), Amoreux de Madame (1909) by Georges Méliès, Flowing Gold (1924), a technicolor version of Ben-Hur (1925), The Lost World (1925), Borrowed Finery (1925), Her Wild Oat (1927), It (1927), Now We're in the Air (1927), best preserved version of F.W. Murnau's Sunrise: A Song of Two Humans (1927), color version of Mysterious Island (1929), Vladimir Suteev's Street Across (1931) and other films by John Ford, Henry King, Tod Browning, Maurice Tourneur, and William Wellman.

== Functions ==
The National Film Archive offers:

- Access to Czech or Czechoslovak film materials and special collections, including technical cooperation, e.g. researching materials relating to people and specific themes
- Voluntary deposits of existing or newly created cinematographic works, free deposits of reproductive and preservation material to permanent archival care
- Access to collections as part of school and educational screenings or other academic and scientific activities
- Professional consultations or expert cooperation on Czech and international projects in the field of preservation, processing, cataloguing, research, theory and history of film and film archiving
- Publishing house
- Film educational programmes
- Representation of Czech cinema in major markets and international festivals
- Disseminating information about funding options offered in the MEDIA financial programme.

== See also ==
- List of film archives
- Cinema of Czech Republic
