= East and West (film) =

1923 film

- Directed by: Ivan Abramson; Sidney M. Goldin
- Written by: Sidney M. Goldin; Eugen Preiß
- Starring: Molly Picon; Jacob Kalich; Sidney M. Goldin
- Production companies: Bicon Film; Listo Film
- Release date: 17 August 1923
- Running time: 8 reels
- Country: Austria
- Languages: Silent; German intertitles

East and West (German: Ost und West) is a 1923 Austrian silent drama film directed by Ivan Abramson and Sidney M. Goldin and starring Molly Picon, Jacob Kalich and Sidney M. Goldin. It is also known by the alternative title of Good Luck.

== Cast ==
- Molly Picon as Mollie
- Jacob Kalich as Jacob Talmudist aka Ben Ali
- Sidney M. Goldin as Morris Brownstein aka Brown
- Laura Glucksman as Grandmother Brownstein
- Eugen Neufeld as Alfred Freed
- Johannes Roth
- Ida Astori
- Sigi Hofer
- Saul Nathan
- Eugen Preiß
- Nelly Spodek

== Bibliography ==
- Judith N. Goldberg. Laughter through tears: the Yiddish cinema. Fairleigh Dickinson University Press, 1983.
