= Sidney M. Goldin =

American film director

Sidney M. Goldin, born Samuel Goldstein (March 25, 1878 – September 19, 1937) was an American silent film director as well as a prominent writer, actor and producer for Yiddish theater and Yiddish cinema during the early 20th century. During his career, he worked frequently with Molly Picon, Maurice Schwartz and Ludwig Satz in Europe and Palestine.

== Career ==
Born in Odessa, his family emigrated to the United States in about 1880 or 1881. In New York, Goldin attended public school and was interested in theatre. In about 1895, he started as actor in small roles in theatres on the US eastcoast. In the early 1900s, he started acting in films in New York and for two years for Essanay in Chicago. 1912 he started directing films, plenty of them already treating Jewish topics. After World War I, in 1919, he moved to London and Prague, where he directed some movies. In 1921 he came to Vienna, where he directed at least four feature films, including Ost und West (“East and West”) in 1923, starring the famous Yiddish actress Molly Picon. Also in Vienna, he married the young actress of the Freie Jüdische Volksbühne (Independent Jewish Theatre) Betty Gärtner in November 1924.

In 1925 he moved back to New York. Brought to Hollywood in 1926, Goldin produced Yiskor with Maurice Schwartz before becoming a director for independent producers the following year. However, while under contract for A-B Studios, his film On the Mountains was considered a commercial and artistic failure nearly resulting in the bankruptcy of the studio.

After filming East Side Sadie in 1929, starring his wife, he returned east to produce Yiddish "talkies" until the 1930s although he would take a three-year absence from filmmaking until directing his last film The Cantor's Son in 1937. Becoming ill while on location in Easton, Pennsylvania, Goldin died of a heart ailment while at French Hospital in New York City, New York on the night of September 19, 1937.

== Filmography ==
- The Cantor's Son (1937) (uncredited)
- The Voice of Israel (1934)
- Live and Laugh (1933)
- Uncle Moses (1932)
- His Wife's Lover (1931)
- A Cantor on Trial (1931)
- Feast of Passover (1931)
- Shulamis (1931)
- Shulamith (1931)
- Eternal Fools (1930)
- The Jewish Gypsy (1930)
- Kol Nidre (1930)
- My Jewish Mother (1930)
- Oy, Doktor! (1930)
- Sailor's Sweetheart (1930)
- Shoemaker's Romance (1930)
- The Eternal Prayer (1929)
- East Side Sadie (1929)
- Style and Class (1929)
- The Fightin' Comeback (1927)
- Yizkor (1924)
- East and West (1923)
- Lead Us Not into Temptation (1922), print survives at the Library of Congress, as "The Polish Jew"
- Look After Your Daughters (1922)
- The Bird Fancier (1920)
- Tam na horách (1920)
- The Woman Hater (short film, 1920)
- The Gates of Doom (1919)
- The Mysterious Mr. Browning (1918), credited as Sidney M. Golden
- It Can't Be Done (1918), credited as Sidney M. Golden
- Oh! What a Whopper! (1916), credited as Sidney M. Golden
- Billy's College Job (1915)
- When the Call Came (1915/I), credited as Sidney M. Golden
- The Hunchback's Romance (1915), credited as Sidney M. Golden
- What Might Have Been (1915/I), credited as Sidney M. Golden
- The Last of the Mafia (1915)
- Hear Ye, Israel (1915)
- The Jewish Crown (1915), credited as Sidney M. Golden
- The Period of the Jew (1915), credited as Sidney M. Golden
- The Heart of a Jewess (1913)
- The Adventures of Lieutenant Petrosino (1912) print survives in the Filmmuseum in Amsterdam
- A Western Child's Heroism (1912), credited as Sidney Golden
