= Marcelle Praince =

French actress (1882–1969)

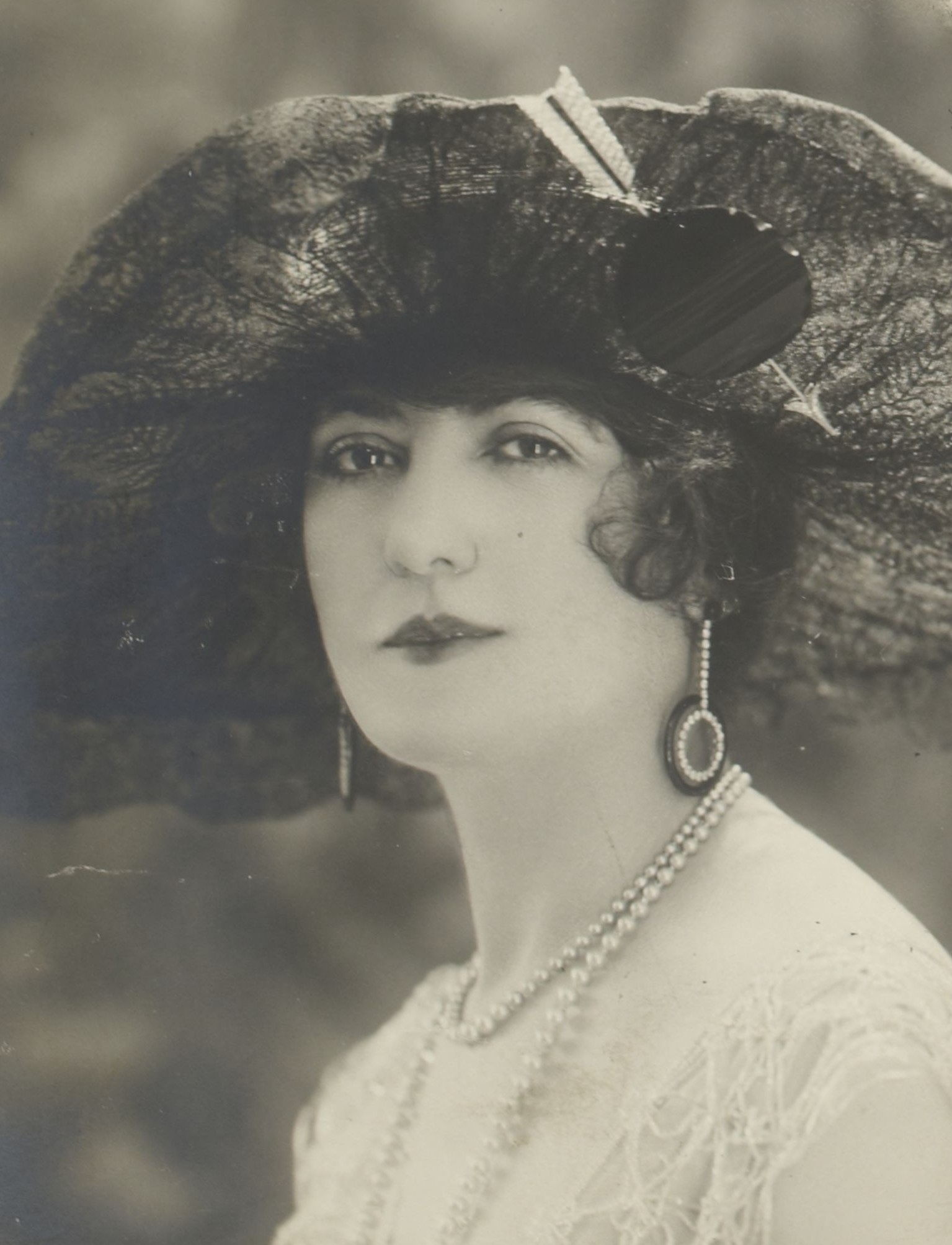
- Marcelle Praince, by Reutlinger
- Born: Célestine Cardi; 9 June 1882; Vigeois, Corrèze, France
- Died: 26 October 1969 (aged 87); Maisons-Laffitte, Yvelines, France
- Occupation: Actress

Marcelle Praince (9 June 1882 – 26 October 1969) was a French actress.

Praince was born Célestine Cardi in Vigeois, Corrèze, France and died in Maisons-Laffitte, Yvelines.

Praince acted in dozens of films and appeared in stage productions. As a young woman she was considered a fashionable stage beauty. During World War I, she was a member of the French Army Theater (Theatre aux Armes), a troupe of performers who entertained French soldiers in villages close to the front; her "beauty has cheered many a man about to die, or brought him back from the clutch of death", wrote Maude Radford Warren, a Canadian reporter, in 1917.

Praince performed in French productions in London, including the revue Plantons les capucines (1914). In 1921 she appeared in three Louis Verneuil plays on the London stage: Le traité d'Auteuil, L'honneur de Letournel, and La jeune fille au bain. She was in a French adaptation of Harvey at the Theatre Antoine in 1950.

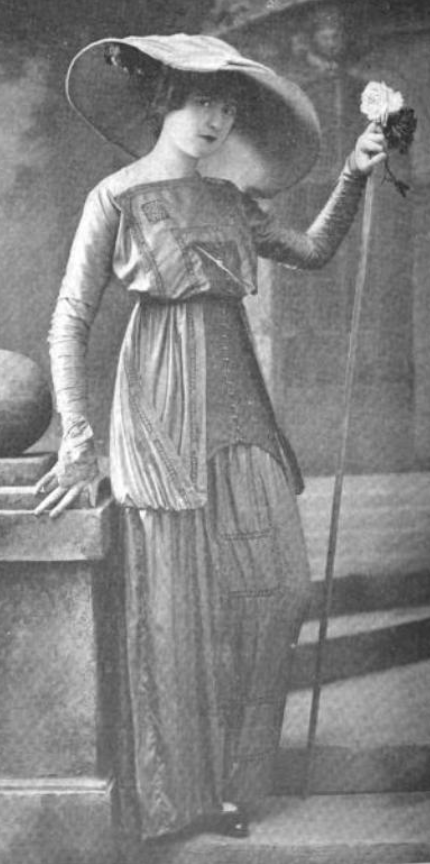
Marcelle Praince modeling a gown, from a 1912 publication

== Selected filmography ==
- Should We Wed Them? (1932)
- The Red Robe (1933)
- Sapho (1934)
- The Blue Mouse (1936)
- La Garçonne (1936)
- Parisian Life (1936)
- School for Journalists (1936)
- The Man of the Hour (1937)
- A Picnic on the Grass (1937)
- White Cargo (1937)
- Entence Cordiale (1939)
- The Fatted Calf (1939)
- The Duraton Family (1939)
- Place de la Concorde (1939)
- The Snow on the Footsteps (1942)
- Florence Is Crazy (1944)
- A Cage of Nightingales (1945)
- Father Goriot (1945)
- Captain Blomet (1947)
- The Three Cousins (1947)
- The Mysterious Monsieur Sylvain (1947)
- Dilemma of Two Angels (1948)
- The Cupid Club (1949)
- Doctor Laennec (1949)
- The Girl from Maxim's (1950)
- Darling Caroline (1951)
- Under the Sky of Paris (1951)
- Two Pennies Worth of Violets (1951)
- Matrimonial Agency (1952)
- Madame du Barry (1954)
- L'Air de Paris (1954)
- Every Day Has Its Secret (1958)
