= You Have to Be Beautiful =

1951 film

- Directed by: Ákos Ráthonyi
- Written by: Gustav Kampendonk; Kurt Schwabach; Fritz von Woedtke
- Produced by: Walter Koppel; Gyula Trebitsch
- Starring: Sonja Ziemann; Willy Fritsch; Anny Ondra
- Cinematography: Willy Winterstein
- Edited by: Klaus Dudenhöfer
- Music by: Michael Jary
- Production company: Real Film
- Release date: 1 February 1951
- Running time: 96 minutes
- Country: Germany
- Language: German

You Have to Be Beautiful (German: Schön muß man sein) is a 1951 German musical comedy film directed by Ákos Ráthonyi and starring Sonja Ziemann, Willy Fritsch and Anny Ondra. The film's sets were designed by art director Mathias Matthies. It was Ondra's final film apart from a brief cameo role in The Affairs of Julie.

It was made at the Wandsbek Studios of the Hamburg-based Real Film.

== Plot ==
Impresario Zwickel fears for the preview of the new operetta. One day remains to complete the fragmentary opus. The complete finale is missing. While Zwickel is plodding to bring the dawdling composer duo Jupp and Juppi Holunder up to speed, there is mobbing going on behind the scenery: chorister Maria Schippe accuses diva Rose of striking false notes. When the offended star refuses to enter the stage, Maria gets her great chance.

== Cast ==
- Sonja Ziemann as Maria Schippe
- Willy Fritsch as Jupp Holunder
- Anny Ondra as Rose de Lila
- Hardy Krüger as Juppi Holunder Jr.
- Rudolf Platte as Enrico Zwickel
- Hans Richter as Walter Schippe
- Ursula Herking as Wirtschafterin
- Marina Ried as Tilly
- Willy Maertens as Arzt
- Carl Voscherau as Schröder - Portier
- Joseph Offenbach as Kleiner Mann
- Bruno Fritz as Regisseur Treff
- Kurt Meister as Inspizient
- Michael Jary as Kapellmeister
- Jonny Crusoe as Jim
- Horst von Otto as Barchef
- Wolfgang Neuss as Moritatensänger
- Margret Neuhaus as Moritatensänger
- Die Hiller Girls as Themselves
- Ilka Hugo
- Das Original Hohner-Orchester as Orchestra
- Will Raabe
- Albert Vossen

== Bibliography ==
- Bock, Hans-Michael & Bergfelder, Tim. The Concise CineGraph. Encyclopedia of German Cinema. Berghahn Books, 2009.
