= The Fightin' Comeback =

1927 film

- Directed by: Tenny Wright
- Written by: Walter J. Coburn (story); Richard Thorpe
- Produced by: Lester F. Scott Jr.
- Starring: Buddy Roosevelt; Clara Horton; Sidney M. Goldin
- Cinematography: Ray Ries
- Production company: Action Pictures
- Distributed by: Pathé Exchange
- Release date: April 3, 1927
- Running time: 5 reels
- Country: United States
- Languages: Silent; English intertitles

The Fightin' Comeback is a 1927 American silent Western film directed by Tenny Wright and starring Buddy Roosevelt, Clara Horton and Sidney M. Goldin.

== Cast ==
- Buddy Roosevelt as Jim Jones
- Clara Horton as Goldie Lamont
- Sidney M. Goldin as Sam Phillips
- Richard Neill as Three-Card Spencer
- Robert Homans as Sheriff Beasley
- Charles Thurston as Boulder City Sheriff
- Richard Alexander as Red Pollock

== Preservation ==
With no holdings located in archives, The Fightin' Comeback is considered a lost film.
