= Elsie Janis =

American actress (1889–1956)

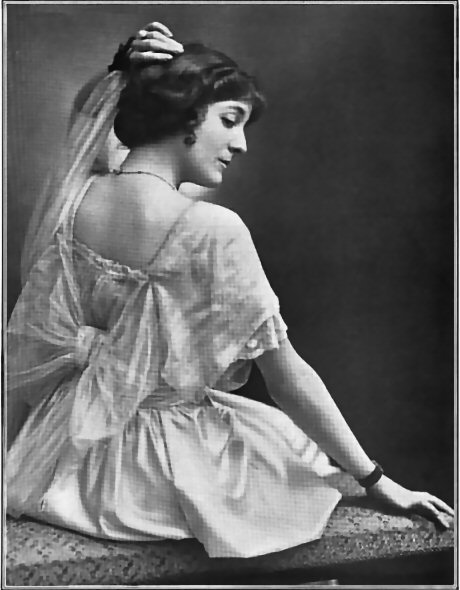
- The Theatre Magazine (November 1915)
- Born: Elsie Bierbower; March 16, 1889; Marion, Ohio, U.S.
- Died: February 26, 1956 (aged 66); Beverly Hills, California, U.S.
- Other name: Little Elsie
- Occupations: Actress (stage and screen); singer; songwriter; screenwriter; radio announcer
- Years active: 1894–1940
- Spouse: Gilbert Wilson (m.1932)

Elsie Janis (born Elsie Bierbower, March 16, 1889 – February 26, 1956) was an American actress of stage and screen, singer, songwriter, screenwriter and radio announcer. Entertaining the troops during World War I immortalized her as "the sweetheart of the AEF" (American Expeditionary Force).

== Early life ==
Elsie Bierbower was born in Marion, Ohio, the daughter of Josephine Janis and John Eleazer Bierbower. She had a brother, Percy John.

== Stage ==
Bierbower debuted on stage in 1896 in a production of East Lynne at Columbus's Southern Theatre. By age 11, she was a headliner on the vaudeville circuit, performing under the name Little Elsie. As she matured, using the stage name Elsie Janis, she began perfecting her comedic skills.

Acclaimed by American and British critics, Janis was a headliner on Broadway and London. On Broadway, she starred in a number of successful shows, including The Vanderbilt Cup (1906), The Hoyden (1907), The Slim Princess (1911), and The Century Girl (1916).

Elsie performed at the grand opening of the Brown Theatre in Louisville, Kentucky on October 5, 1925.

== Film, screenwriting and music ==
Janis also enjoyed a career as a Hollywood actress, screenwriter, production manager and composer. She was co-credited alongside Gene Markey for writing the original story for Close Harmony (1929) and as composer and production manager for Paramount on Parade (1930). She and director Edmund Goulding wrote the song "Love, Your Magic Spell Is Everywhere" for Gloria Swanson for her talkie debut film The Trespasser (1929). Janis's song "Oh, Give Me Time for Tenderness" was featured in the Bette Davis movie Dark Victory (1939), also directed by Goulding.

== Life with Basil Hallam ==
Before he entered service for World War I, English actor-singer Basil Hallam fell in love with Janis, with whom he had starred in The Passing Show of 1915. They set up home in the city of Liverpool, England. The couple never married; Hallam was killed in the Battle of the Somme in August 1916 while serving with the Royal Flying Corps.

== World War I ==
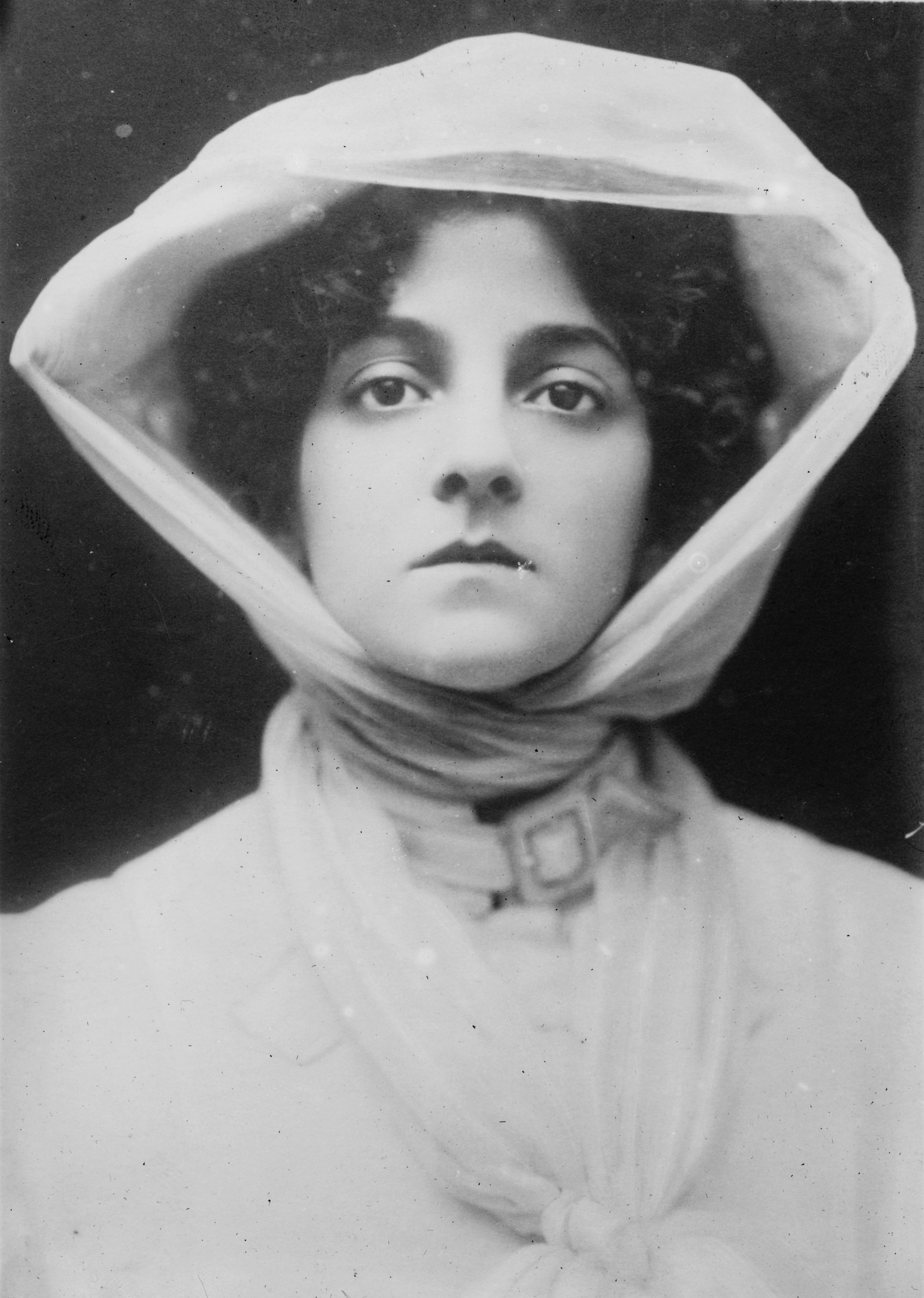
Elsie Janis, 17 years old, in The Vanderbilt Cup 1906. She is dressed in early automobile attire; in the play, she drives a car on stage

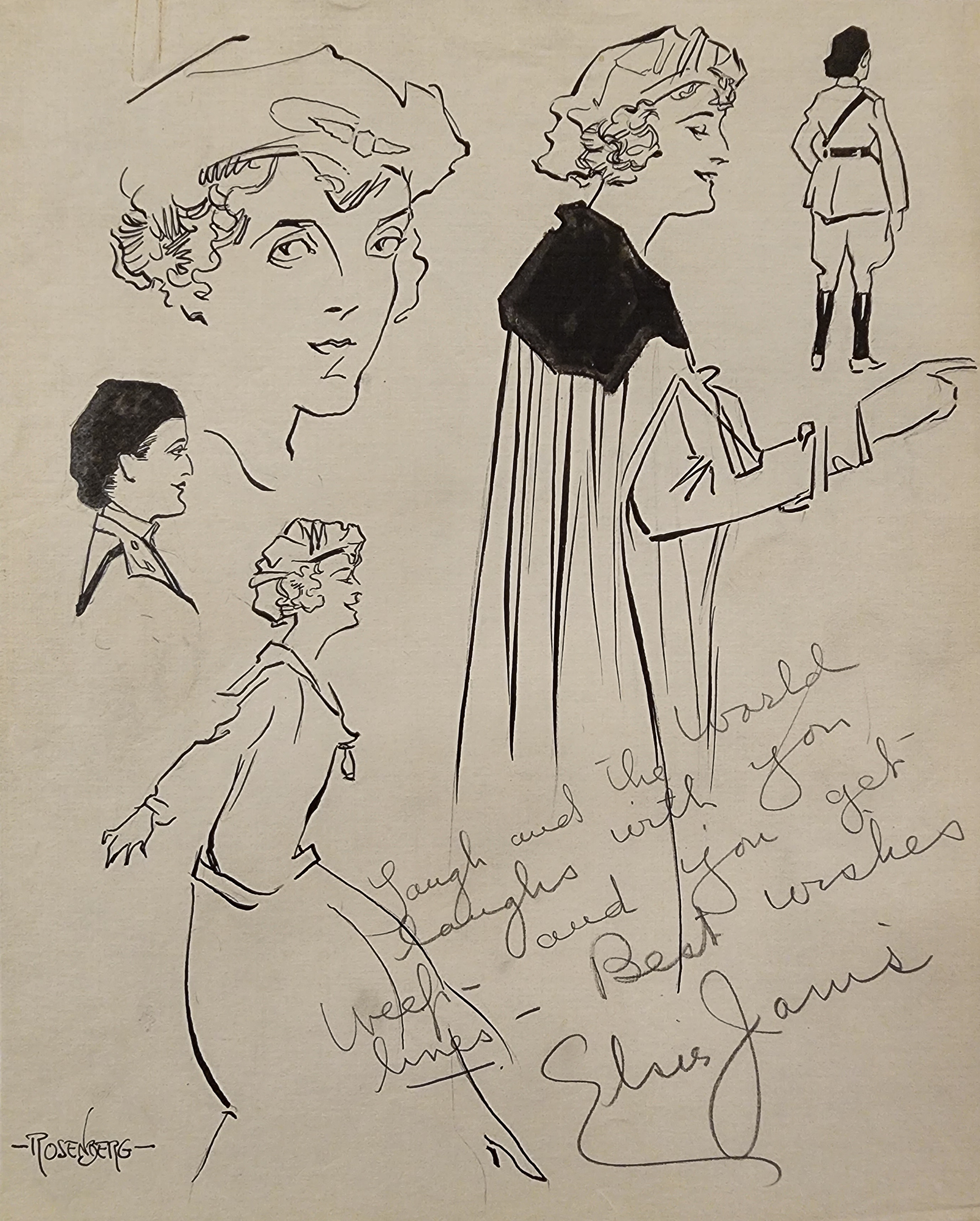
Signed drawing of Elsie Janis by Manuel Rosenberg, 1926

Janis advocated for British and American soldiers fighting in World War I. She raised funds for Liberty Bonds. Accompanied by her mother, Janis also took her act on the road, entertaining troops stationed near the front lines – one of the first popular American artists to do so in a war fought on foreign soil. Ten days after the armistice, she recorded for His Master's Voiceseveral numbers from her revue Hullo, America, including "Give Me the Moonlight, Give Me the Girl". She wrote about her wartime experiences in The Big Show: My Six Months with the American Expeditionary Forces (published in 1919), and recreated these in Behind the Lines, a 1926 Vitaphone musical short.

A musical about this period of her life called Elsie Janis and the Boys, written by Carol J. Crittenden and composer John T. Prestianni, premiered under the direction of Charles A. Wallace as part of the Rotunda Theatre Series in the Wortley-Peabody Theater in Dallas, Texas on August 15, 2014.

== Radio announcer ==
In 1934, Janis became the first female announcer on the NBC radio network.

== Children ==
Janis wanted to have children of her own. She became a foster mother to a 14-year-old Italian war veteran and orphan, Michael Cardi, in 1919.

== Later life ==
Janis maintained her private home “ElJan” on the east side of High Street in Columbus, Ohio. The home was across the street from what was Ohio State University's Ohio Field, the precursor to Ohio Stadium. Janis sold the house following her mother's death.

In 1932, Janis married Gilbert Wilson, who was 16 years her junior, which caused some scandal. There is some evidence it might have been a bearded relationship. The couple lived in the historic Philipsburg Manor House in Sleepy Hollow, New York (the village was called North Tarrytown at the time), until they were seriously injured in an automobile accident in the area. Following the accident, Janis moved to the Los Angeles area of California, where she lived until her death. Her final film was the 1940 Women in War.

Elsie Janis died in 1956 at her home in Beverly Hills, California, aged 66, and was interred in the Forest Lawn Memorial Park Cemetery in Glendale, California.

== Legacy ==
For her contribution to the motion picture industry, Elsie Janis has a star on the Hollywood Walk of Fame at 6776 Hollywood Blvd.

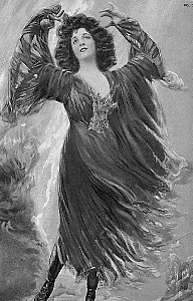
Janis in Theatre Magazine (March 1917)

== Partial filmography ==
- The Caprices of Kitty (1915)
- Betty in Search of a Thrill (1915)
- Nearly a Lady (1915)
- 'Twas Ever Thus (1915)
- The Imp (1919)
- A Regular Girl (1919)
- Bobbed Hair (1925)
- Elsie Janis in a Vaudeville Act, “Behind the Lines,” Assisted by Men’s Chorus of the 107th Regiment (1926)
- Close Harmony (1929) (screenplay)
- Paramount on Parade (1930) (production supervisor)
- Madam Satan (1930) (music)
- The Squaw Man (1931) (screenplay)
- Women in War (1940)
