= Lina Woiwode =

Austrian actress

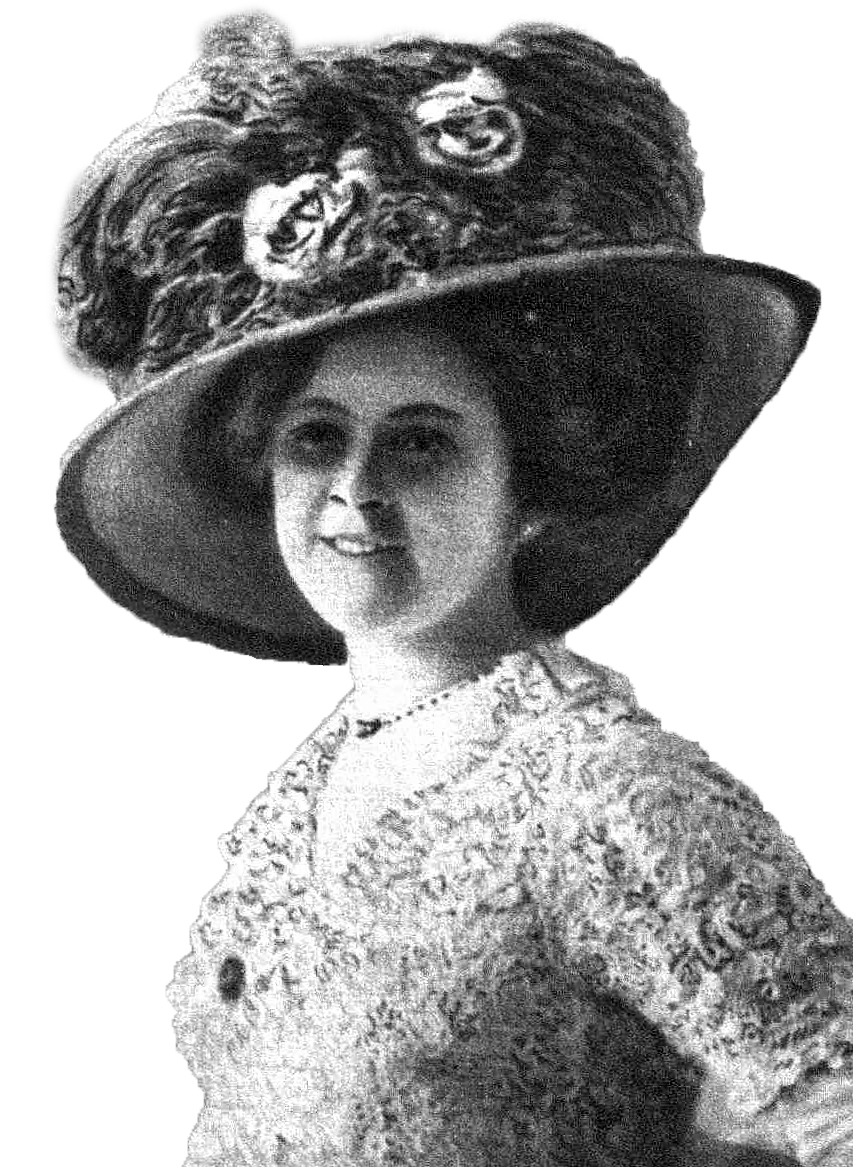
- Born: 1886; Austro-Hungarian Empire
- Died: 17 September 1971 (aged 84–85); Austria
- Occupation: Actress
- Years active: 1917–1949 (film)
- Spouse: Oskar Sima (1929-1969) (his death)

Lina Woiwode (1886–1971) was an Austrian stage and film actress.

== Selected filmography ==
- Her Majesty the Barmaid (1931)
- Once There Was a Waltz (1932)
- The Magic Top Hat (1932)
- The Cruel Mistress (1932)
- Suburban Cabaret (1935)
- The Missing Wife (1937)
- The Unexcused Hour (1937)
- Mirror of Life (1938)
- Anton the Last (1939)
- Viennese Girls (1945)

== Bibliography ==
- Youngkin, Stephen. The Lost One: A Life of Peter Lorre. University Press of Kentucky, 2005.
