= Glorious Youth =

1929 film

- Directed by: Graham Cutts
- Written by: Henry De Vere Stacpoole (novel); Reginald Fogwell; Maclean Rogers
- Produced by: Harry Ham
- Starring: Anny Ondra; William Freshman; Randle Ayrton; Gibb McLaughlin
- Production company: First National-Pathé
- Distributed by: First National-Pathé
- Release date: April 1929
- Running time: 7,146 feet
- Country: United Kingdom
- Languages: Silent; English intertitles

Glorious Youth is a 1929 British silent drama film directed by Graham Cutts and starring Anny Ondra, Randle Ayrton and William Freshman. It is also known by the alternative title of Eileen of the Trees. It was one of two films Cutts made with the Czech actress Anny Ondra. The film is based on the novel Eileen of the Trees by Henry De Vere Stacpoole and was made at Elstree Studios.

== Cast ==
- Anny Ondra - Eileen
- William Freshman
- Randle Ayrton
- Gibb McLaughlin
- A. Bromley Davenport
- Forrester Harvey
- Arthur Roberts
- Jerrold Robertshaw

== Bibliography ==
- Low, Rachel. The History of British Film: Volume IV, 1918–1929. Routledge, 1997.
