= The Caviar Princess =

1930 film

- Directed by: Carl Lamac
- Written by: Hans H. Zerlett; Walter Wassermann; Charlie Roellinghoff
- Produced by: Victor Skutezky
- Starring: Anny Ondra; Maria Forescu; André Roanne; Albert Paulig
- Cinematography: Otto Heller
- Music by: Pasquale Perris
- Production companies: Hom-AG für Filmfabrikation; Sofar-Film
- Release date: 17 January 1930
- Country: Germany
- Languages: Silent; German intertitles

The Caviar Princess (German: Die Kaviarprinzessin) is a 1930 German silent comedy film directed by Carl Lamac and starring Anny Ondra, Maria Forescu and André Roanne. The film's art direction was by Heinrich Richter. It is also known by the alternative title The Virgin of Paris.

== Cast ==
- Anny Ondra as Annemarie
- Maria Forescu as Ihre Tante
- André Roanne as Attaché
- Albert Paulig as Minister
- Ida Wüst as seine Frau
- Josef Rovenský as Jazzsänger
- Hans Mierendorff as Finanzmagnet
- Paul Rehkopf as Schutzmann
- Sig Arno as Dorfbursche
- Carl Walther Meyer as Journalist

== Bibliography ==
- Prawer, S.S. Between Two Worlds: The Jewish Presence in German and Austrian Film, 1910–1933. Berghahn Books, 2005.
