= Franklyn Bellamy =

English stage and film actor (1886–1961)

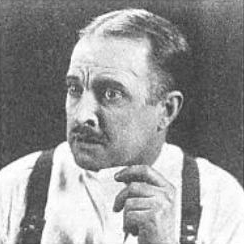
- In God's Clay (1928)
- Born: 7 March 1886; Kuala Lumpur, British Malaya
- Died: 15 February 1961 (aged 74); Bodmin, England
- Occupations: Stage and film actor

Franklyn Bellamy (7 March 1886 in Kuala Lumpur – 15 February 1961 in Bodmin) was an English stage and film actor. In 1924 he appeared in Frederick Lonsdale's melodrama The Fake in the West End.

== Partial filmography ==
- For Her People (1914)
- God's Clay (1928)
- Yellow Stockings (1928)
- Power Over Men (1929)
- Night Birds (1930)
- The Barton Mystery (1932)
- Leap Year (1932)
- Above Rubies (1932)
- The Little Damozel (1933)
- Up for the Derby (1933)
- It's a King (1933)
- Expert's Opinion (1935)
- Member of the Jury (1937)
- Mr. Smith Carries On (1937)
- Splinters in the Air (1937)
- The Last Chance (1937)
- Let's Be Famous (1939)
