= Harry Ham =

Canadian actor (1886–1943)

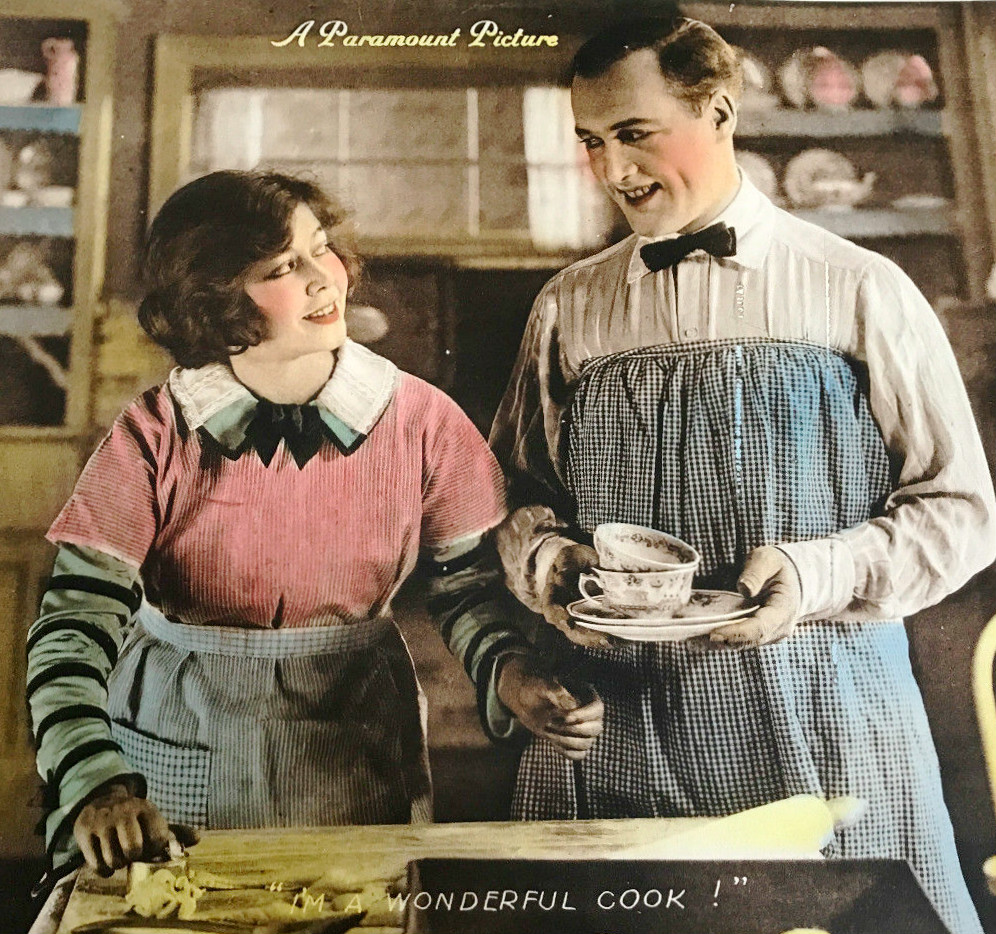
- Ann Pennington and Harry Ham in The Antics of Ann (1917)
- Born: 25 May 1886
- Died: 27 July 1943 (aged 57)

Harry Ham (25 May 1886 – 27 July 1943) was a Canadian actor from Napanee, Ontario. He died in 1943 in Beverly Hills, California.

== Selected filmography ==
Actor

- Betty in Search of a Thrill (1915)
- Nearly a Lady (1915)
- 'Twas Ever Thus (1915)
- Father and the Boys (1915)
- The Grip of Jealousy (1916)
- An Alabaster Box (1917)
- The Antics of Ann (1917)
- Her Kingdom of Dreams (1919)
- Blood Money (1921)
- The Broken Road (1921)
- The Harper's Mystery (1921)
- The Four Feathers (1921)
- Dangerous Lies (1921)
- The Spanish Jade (1922)

Producer

- God's Clay (1928)
- Glorious Youth (1929)
