= Nearly a Lady =

1915 film by Hobart Bosworth

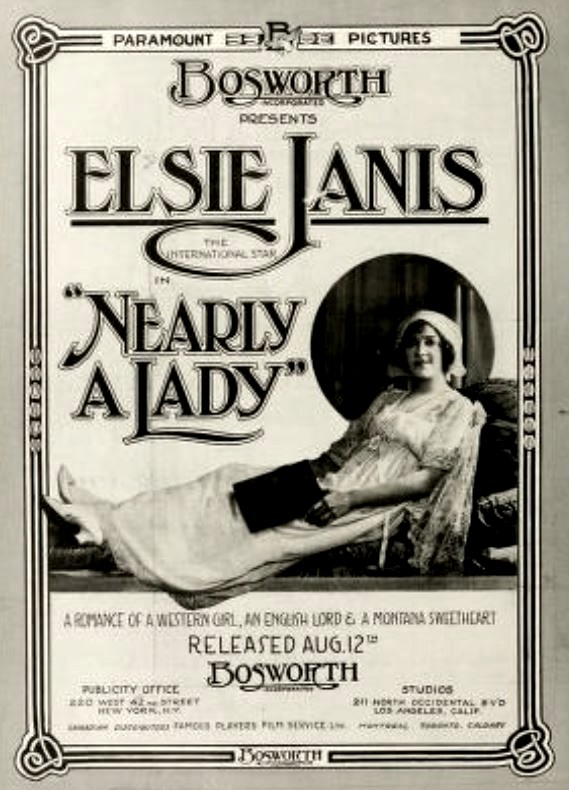
- lobby poster
- Directed by: Hobart Bosworth
- Story by: Elsie Janis
- Produced by: Hobart Bosworth
- Starring: Elsie Janis; Frank Elliott; Owen Moore; Myrtle Stedman; Harry Ham
- Production company: Hobart Bosworth Productions
- Distributed by: Paramount Pictures
- Release date: August 12, 1915
- Country: United States
- Language: English

Nearly a Lady is a lost 1915 American comedy silent film directed by Hobart Bosworth and written by Elsie Janis. The film stars Elsie Janis, Frank Elliott, Owen Moore, Myrtle Stedman and Harry Ham. The film was released on August 12, 1915, by Paramount Pictures.

== Cast ==
- Elsie Janis as Frederica Calhoun
- Frank Elliott as Lord Cecil Grosvenor
- Owen Moore as Jack Rawlins
- Myrtle Stedman as Mrs. Reginald Brooks
- Harry Ham as Jim Brooks
- Roberta Hickman as Elaine
