= Eve's Daughters =

1928 film

- French poster
- Directed by: Karel Lamač
- Written by: Jan S. Kolár; Helmuth Orthmann; Charlie Roellinghoff
- Produced by: Harry R. Sokal
- Starring: Anny Ondra; Karel Lamač; Máňa Ženíšková; Wolfgang Zilzer
- Cinematography: Otto Heller; Arthur Porchet
- Production companies: Bratři Deglové; Sokal-Film
- Distributed by: Bayerische Film; Degl a spol.
- Release date: 4 April 1928
- Running time: 90 minutes
- Countries: Czechoslovakia; Germany
- Languages: Silent; German intertitles Czech intertitles

Eve's Daughters (German: Evas Töchter; Czech: Dcery Eviny) is a 1928 Czech-German silent drama film directed by Karel Lamač and starring Anny Ondra, Karel Lamač and Wolfgang Zilzer.

The film's sets were designed by the art director Victor Trivas.

== Cast ==
- Anny Ondra as Dancer Nina Laval
- Karel Lamač as Rudolf Bünzli
- Máňa Ženíšková as Marie Santo
- Wolfgang Zilzer as Baron Hans von Stetten
- Steffie Vida as Baroness Edith
- Theodor Pištěk as Baron Bihl / Tramp
- Uli Tridenskaja as Rudolf's Mother
- Albert Paulig as Detective Harry Pilka
- Václav Srb as Tramp
- Friedel Seiler as Fisher's Daughter
