= The Antics of Ann =

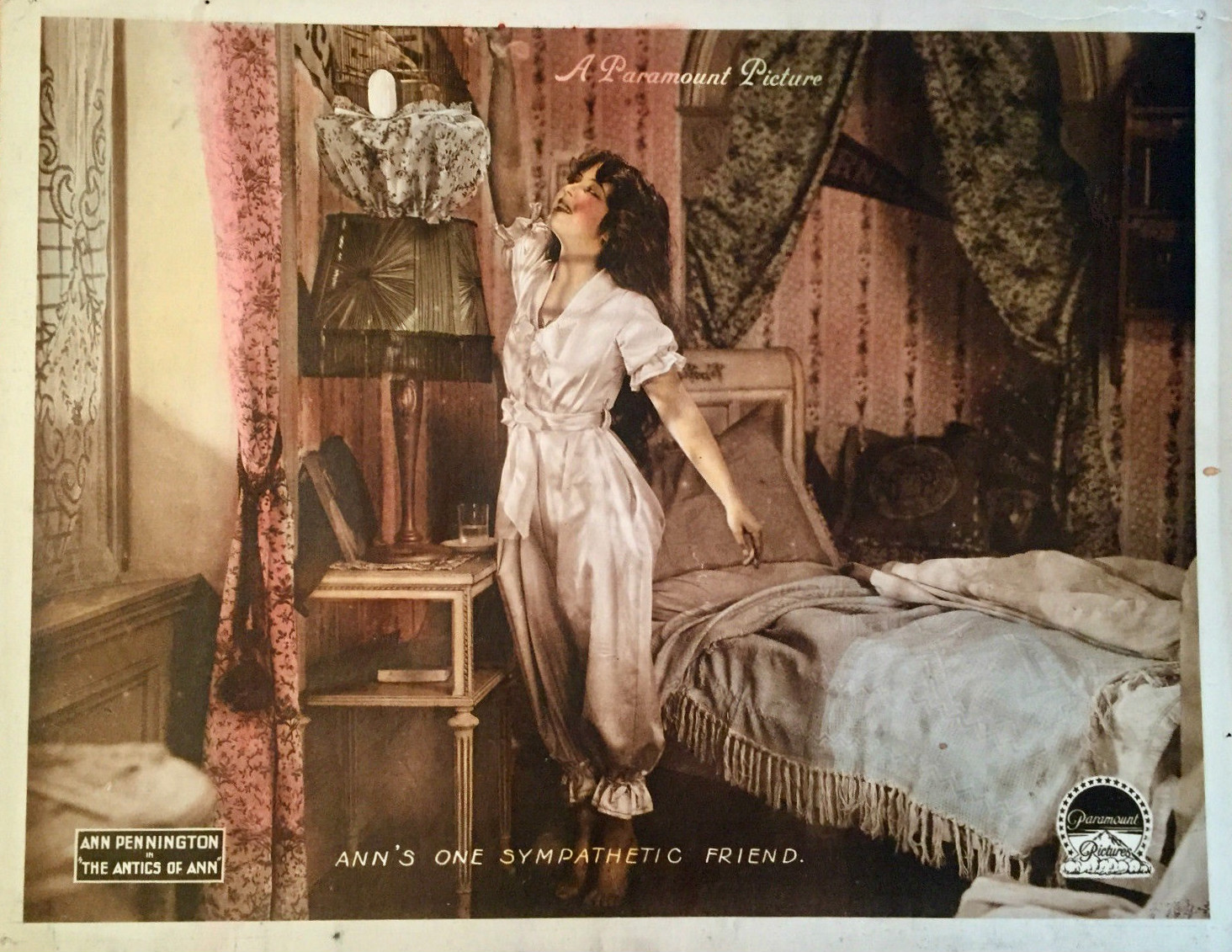
- Lobby card
- Directed by: Edward Dillon
- Written by: Coolidge W. Streeter
- Story by: Frederic Chapin
- Produced by: Adolph Zukor
- Starring: Ann Pennington
- Cinematography: Lewis W. Physioc
- Distributed by: Paramount Pictures
- Release date: November 5, 1917
- Running time: 5 reels
- Country: United States
- Language: Silent (English intertitles)

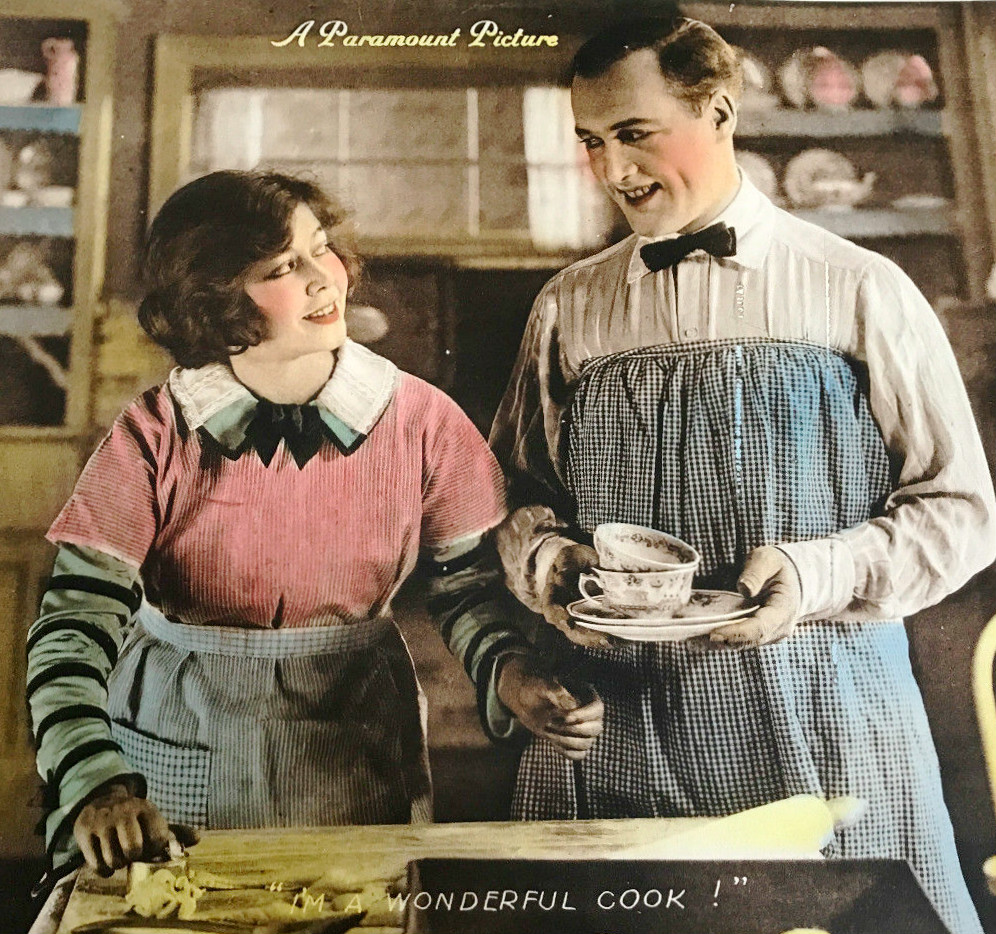
lobby poster.

The Antics of Ann is a lost 1917 American silent comedy film directed by Edward Dillon and starring Ann Pennington.

== Plot ==
As described in a film magazine, after breaking every rule in the Bredwell Seminary, Ann Wharton is dismissed. Seeking to beat the notification of her dismissal to her father, she runs away from school that night. She goes to sleep in a row boat and is awakened the next morning when her craft bumps a railroad bridge. After meeting Tom Randall, with whom she has formed a friendship, he takes her home where her father finds them, having been appraised by the seminary principal who hinted at an elopement. Ann is then taken to a winter resort where her father and sister Olive are staying. Here Tom finds her again. She breaks up an elopement of her sister and a fortune hunter by going to the latter's room and staying there until the time for the tryst has passed. Accused of compromising herself by her father, she goes to Tom's apartment and demands that he marry her, which he does. The couple receive the blessing of her father.

== Cast ==
- Ann Pennington as Ann Wharton
- Harry Ham as Tom Randall
- Ormi Hawley as Olive Wharton
- Crauford Kent as Gordon Trent
- William T. Carleton as Mr. Wharton (credited as W. T. Carleton)
- Charlotte Granville as Mrs. Bredwell
