= Suburban Cabaret =

1935 film by Werner Hochbaum

- Directed by: Werner Hochbaum
- Written by: Ernst Neubach; Werner Hochbaum
- Based on: Der Gemeine by Felix Salten
- Produced by: Ernst Neubach
- Starring: Mathias Wieman; Luise Ullrich; Oskar Sima; Lina Woiwode
- Cinematography: Eduard Hoesch
- Edited by: Ludolf Grisebach
- Music by: Anton Profes
- Production company: Styria-Film
- Distributed by: Styria-Film
- Release date: 17 January 1935
- Running time: 93 minutes
- Country: Austria
- Language: German

Suburban Cabaret (German: Vorstadtvarieté) is a 1935 Austrian musical drama film directed by Werner Hochbaum and starring Mathias Wieman, Luise Ullrich and Oskar Sima. It was shot at the Sievering Studios in Vienna. The film's sets were designed by the art director Alfred Kunz. It is based on the play Der Gemeine by Felix Salten.

== Cast ==
- Mathias Wieman as Josef Kernthaler, Bauzeichner
- Luise Ullrich as Mizzi Ebeseder, seine Braut
- Oskar Sima as Franz Ebeseder, ihr Bruder, Volkssänger
- Lina Woiwode as Mutter Ebeseder
- Olly Gebauer as Sophie, Volkssängerin
- Hans Moser as Der alte Kernthaler
- Frida Richard as Mutter Kernthaler
- Rudolf Carl as Schulmeister Edelfink
- Otto Hartmann as Leutnant von Daffinger
- Anton Pointner as Oberleutnant Höfelmeyer
- Fritz Imhoff as Der Feldwebel
- Lilian Bergo as Mariska
- Karl Skraup as Klavierspieler

== Bibliography ==
- Hake, Sabine. Popular Cinema of the Third Reich. University of Texas Press, 2001.
