= The Cruel Mistress =

1932 film by Carl Lamac

- Directed by: Carl Lamac
- Written by: Hans H. Zerlett; Walter Wassermann
- Produced by: Anatol Potock; Carl Lamac; Anny Ondra
- Starring: Anny Ondra; Fritz Rasp; Lina Woiwode
- Cinematography: Otto Heller; Josef Wirsching; Ernst Zahn
- Edited by: Ella Ensink
- Music by: Rolf Marbot; Bert Reisfeld
- Production companies: Ondra-Lamac-Film; Lothar Stark-Film
- Distributed by: Hugo Engel-Filmgesellschaft
- Release date: 12 July 1932
- Running time: 78 minutes
- Countries: Austria; Germany
- Language: German

The Cruel Mistress (German: Die grausame Freundin) is a 1932 Austrian-German comedy film directed by Carl Lamac and starring Anny Ondra, Fritz Rasp and Lina Woiwode. A separate French-language version Should We Wed Them? was also released. The film's sets were designed by the art directors Otto Erdmann and Hans Sohnle.

== Plot ==
Professor Bock, a quarrelsome astronomer, has long had a falling out with his brother, who went to America after marrying a circus performer. When his brother's widow and her son Jim arrive, a romance blossoms between the young man and the professor's daughter Welgunda.

== Cast ==
- Anny Ondra as Welgunda
- Fritz Rasp as Professor Bock
- Lina Woiwode as Frau Bock
- Werner Fuetterer as Jim Bock
- Olga Limburg as Jim Bocks Mutter
- Ernst Arndt as Professor Bierbrot
- Carl Goetz as Zirkusdirektor
- Karl Forest as Schulinspektor
- Dorothy Poole as Sängerin
- Gustav Werner as Hoteldirektor
- Hugo Thimig

== Bibliography ==
- Robert von Dassanowsky. Austrian Cinema: A History. McFarland, 2005.
