= Lead Us Not into Temptation (film) =

1922 film

- Directed by: Sidney M. Goldin
- Written by: Sidney M. Goldin
- Produced by: Sidney M. Goldin
- Starring: Karel Lamač; Anny Ondra
- Cinematography: Josef Zeitlinger
- Production company: Goldin-Film
- Release date: 1922
- Country: Austria
- Languages: Silent; German intertitles

Lead Us Not into Temptation (German: Führe uns nicht in Versuchung) is a 1922 Austrian silent film directed by Sidney M. Goldin and starring Karel Lamač and Anny Ondra.

== Cast ==
- Paul Baratoff
- Josef Zetenius
- Sybill de Brée
- Anny Ondra
- Marta Schlettinger
- Karel Lamač
- Carlo Rittmann
- Bela Lukacs
- Teddy Kolieb

== Bibliography ==
- Bock, Hans-Michael & Bergfelder, Tim. The Concise CineGraph. Encyclopedia of German Cinema. Berghahn Books, 2009.
