= Fairground People =

1930 film

- Directed by: Carl Lamac
- Written by: Charlie Roellinghoff; Václav Wasserman; Hans H. Zerlett
- Starring: Anny Ondra; Sig Arno; Margarete Kupfer
- Cinematography: Erich Giese; Otto Heller
- Music by: Jára Benes
- Production company: Ondra-Lamač-Film
- Release date: 14 August 1930
- Running time: 98 minutes
- Country: Germany
- Language: German

Fairground People (1930)

Fairground People (German: Die vom Rummelplatz, also known as Czech: Sensace) is a 1930 German comedy film directed by Carl Lamac (Karel Lamač) and starring Anny Ondra, Sig Arno and Margarete Kupfer. The film was made shortly after the sound revolution, which had damaged Ondra's career in British films and led her to return to Germany. It was the first production by Ondra-Lamač-Film, the company set up by Ondra and Lamač. It showcased Ondra's talents as a musical comedy star who sings and dances. Ondra's character dresses up as Mickey Mouse for her performances, and the film was known by the alternative title of Mickey Mouse Girl (Das Micky-Maus-Girl).

== Cast ==
- Anny Ondra as Anny Flock
- Sig Arno as Hannes, Ausrufer
- Margarete Kupfer as Annys Mutter
- Viktor Schwanneke as Annys Vater
- Toni Girardi as Ordini
- Max Ehrlich as Horbes, Agent
- Kurt Gerron as Schaubudenbesitzer
- Gretl Basch as Mimi
- Yvette Rodin as Lily
- Julius Falkenstein
- Paul Morgan
- Walter Norbert
- Paul Rehkopf
- Fritz Spira
- Bruno Arno

== Bibliography ==
- Bock, Hans-Michael; Bergfelder, Tim, eds. (2009). The Concise Cinegraph: Encyclopaedia of German Cinema. Berghahn Books. ISBN 978-1-57181-655-9.
