= Look After Your Daughters =

1922 film

- Directed by: Sidney M. Goldin
- Produced by: Sidney M. Goldin
- Starring: Franz Höbling; Anny Ondra; Carl Lamac
- Cinematography: Josef Zeitlinger
- Production company: Goldin-Film
- Release date: 14 April 1922
- Country: Austria
- Languages: Silent; German intertitles

Look After Your Daughters (German: Hütet eure Töchter) is a 1922 Austrian silent comedy film directed by Sidney M. Goldin and starring Franz Höbling, Anny Ondra and Carl Lamac.

== Cast ==
- Franz Höbling
- Carlo Rittermann
- Karel Lamač
- Anna Kallina
- Molly Picon
- Sybill de Brée
- Anny Ondra
- Pauline Schweighofer

== Bibliography ==
- Bock, Hans-Michael & Bergfelder, Tim. The Concise CineGraph. Encyclopedia of German Cinema. Berghahn Books, 2009.
