= An Alabaster Box =

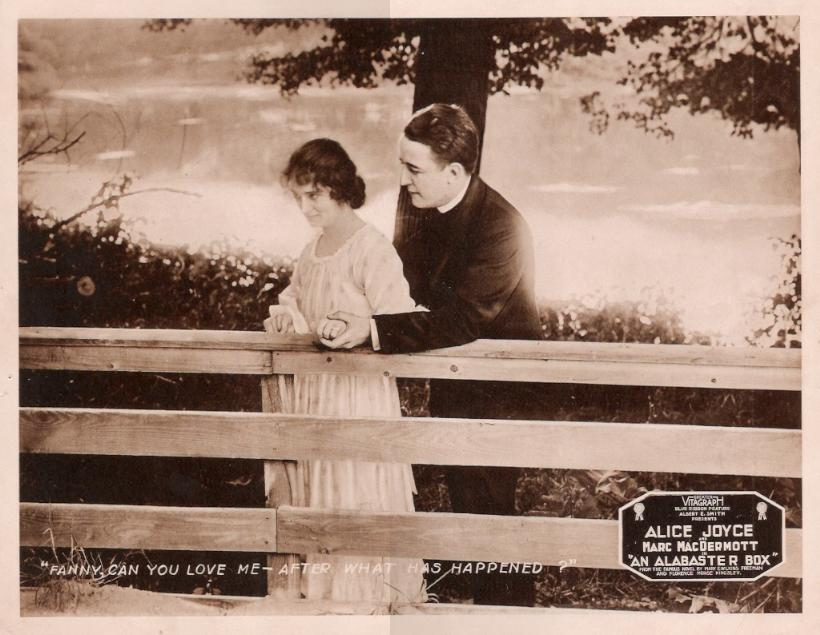
- Lobby card
- Directed by: Chester Withey
- Written by: A. Van Buren Powell
- Story by: Mary Eleanor Freeman; Florence Morse Kingsley
- Starring: Alice Joyce; Marc McDermott; Harry Ham
- Cinematography: Viola Lawrence
- Production company: Vitagraph Company of America
- Distributed by: V-L-S-E
- Release date: September 10, 1917
- Running time: 5 reels
- Country: United States
- Language: Silent (English intertitles)

An Alabaster Box is a lost 1917 American silent drama film directed by Chester Withey and starring Alice Joyce, Marc McDermott, and Harry Ham. It was produced by the Vitagraph Company of America.

== Cast ==
- Alice Joyce as Lydia Bolton / Lydia Orr
- Marc McDermott as Andrew Bolton
- Harry Ham as Jim Dodge
- Aida Horton as Lydia (child)
- Patsy De Forest as Fanny Dodge
- Frank Hall Crane as Wesley Elliott

== Preservation ==
With no holdings located in archives, An Alabaster Box is considered a lost film.

== Bibliography ==
- Donald W. McCaffrey & Christopher P. Jacobs. Guide to the Silent Years of American Cinema. Greenwood Publishing, 1999. ISBN 0-313-30345-2
