= Charlie Roellinghoff =

German writer (1897–1935)

- Born: 11 August 1897; Munich, German Empire
- Died: 17 August 1935 (aged 38); Berlin, Germany
- Occupation: Screenwriter
- Years active: 1927–1934 (film )

Karl Gottlieb Josef "Charlie" Roellinghoff (1897–1935) was a German screenwriter and novelist.

== Selected filmography ==
- The Merry Farmer (1927)
- The Queen of Spades (1927)
- Eve's Daughters (1928)
- Alraune (1930)
- The Caviar Princess (1930)
- Fairground People (1930)
- Everybody Wins (1930)
- The Copper (1930)
- The Singing City (1930)
- Every Woman Has Something (1931)
- Headfirst into Happiness (1931)
- Holzapfel Knows Everything (1932)
- A Thousand for One Night (1933)
- Girls of Today (1933)
- There Goes Susie (1934)
- North Pole, Ahoy (1934)
- White Slaves (1937)

== Bibliography ==
- Benson, Michael. Vintage Science Fiction Films, 1896-1949. McFarland, 2000.
