= Should We Wed Them? =

1932 film

- Directed by: Pierre Billon; Carl Lamac
- Written by: Henri-Georges Clouzot; Walter Wassermann; Hans H. Zerlett
- Starring: Anny Ondra; Lucien Baroux; Marcelle Praince
- Cinematography: Otto Heller
- Edited by: Ella Ensink
- Music by: Rolf Marbot; Bert Reisfeld
- Production company: Les Films Osso
- Distributed by: Les Films Osso
- Release date: 1 July 1932
- Running time: 86 minutes
- Country: France
- Language: French

Should We Wed Them? (French: Faut-il les marier ?) is a 1932 French comedy film directed by Pierre Billon and Carl Lamac and starring Anny Ondra, Lucien Baroux and Marcelle Praince. The film's sets were designed by the art directors Otto Erdmann and Hans Sohnle. It is the French-language version of the Austrian film The Cruel Mistress.

== Plot ==
Professor Bock is in the process of inaugurating a new museum, the anonymous donation for which actually came from his sister in law, a former tight rope walker, who he dislikes.

== Cast ==
- Anny Ondra as Anny
- Lucien Baroux as Prof. Bock
- Marcelle Praince as Miss Flora
- Jean-Pierre Aumont as Jim
- Charles Lamy as Prof. Petou
- Rachel Launay as Mrs. Bock
- Henri Kerny as The inspector

== Bibliography ==
- Crisp, Colin. Genre, Myth and Convention in the French Cinema, 1929-1939. Indiana University Press, 2002.
