= 'Twas Ever Thus =

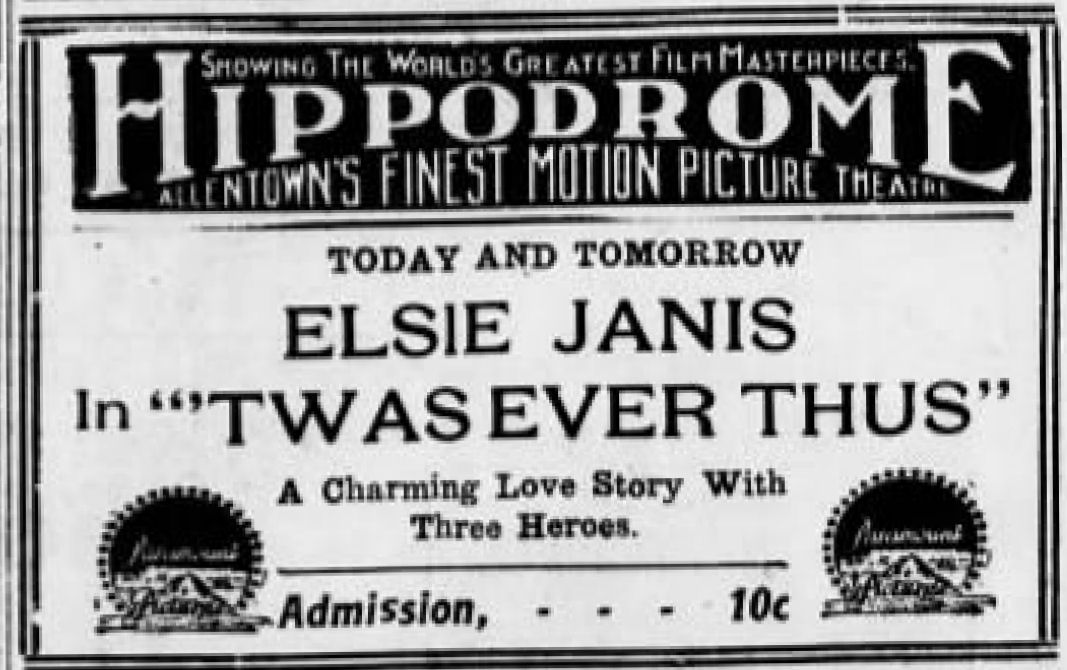
- Newspaper advertisement
- Directed by: Hobart Bosworth
- Story by: Elsie Janis
- Produced by: Hobart Bosworth
- Starring: Elsie Janis; Hobart Bosworth; Owen Moore; Myrtle Stedman; Harry Ham; Helen Wolcott
- Production company: Hobart Bosworth Productions
- Distributed by: Paramount Pictures
- Release date: September 23, 1915
- Running time: 5 reels
- Country: United States
- Language: Silent (English intertitles)

'Twas Ever Thus is a 1915 American drama silent film directed by Hobart Bosworth, written by Elsie Janis, and starring Elsie Janis, Hobart Bosworth, Owen Moore, Myrtle Stedman, Harry Ham, and Helen Wolcott. It was released on September 23, 1915, by Paramount Pictures.

== Plot ==
In the Stone Age, a caveman named Long Biceps tries to court a cavewoman named Lithesome. Lithesome's father, Hard Muscle, is against the marriage. Long Biceps manages to defeat Hard Muscle, winning Lithesome.

The film then jumps to the American Civil War, where a woman named Prudence Alden leaves Boston to care for her wounded brother in the south. Prudence falls in love with a Confederate soldier named Frank Warren. Frank's father, Col. Warren, opposes the romance. Frank defeats him, and continues his relationship with Prudence.

The film jumps to 1915, where a woman named Marian Gordon is trying to become a novelist. A publisher named John Rogers tells her that that she needs more life experience, so Marian takes a job as a maid in his house. She falls in love with his son, Jack. John approves of their relationship. Marian releases a bestselling novel.

== Cast ==
- Elsie Janis as Lithesome / Prudence Alden / Marian Gordon
- Hobart Bosworth as Hard Muscle / Col. Warren / John Rogers
- Owen Moore as Long Biceps / Frank Warren / Jack Rogers
- Myrtle Stedman as Joysome / Betty Judkns / chorus girl
- Harry Ham as Joe Alden / Sub-editor
- Helen Wolcott as Jean Hopkins / Helen Farnum
- Joe Ray as A Tough
- Ludloe Goodman as George St. John
- Charles Wainwright as Jack's Friend
- Art Acord as Manservant (uncredited)

== Production ==
The film was supposed to include four sections, but the fourth section, set in 1905, may not have ended up in the film.

Scenes set in the Stone Age were shot in Chatsworth, Los Angeles.

The film is considered lost.

== See also ==
- List of films and television shows about the American Civil War
