= God's Clay (1928 film) =

1928 film

- Directed by: Graham Cutts
- Written by: Claude Askew (novel); Alice Askew (novel); Maclean Rogers
- Produced by: Harry Ham
- Starring: Anny Ondra; Trilby Clark; Franklyn Bellamy; Haddon Mason
- Production company: First National Pictures
- Distributed by: First National Film Distributors
- Release date: August 1928
- Running time: 6,301 feet
- Country: United Kingdom
- Languages: Silent; English intertitles

God's Clay is a 1928 British silent drama film directed by Graham Cutts and starring Anny Ondra, Trilby Clark, Haddon Mason and Franklyn Bellamy. It is an adaptation of the novel God's Clay by Claude Askew and Alice Askew. It had previously been made into a 1919 film of the same name. The film was made at Elstree Studios by the British subsidiary of the First National Pictures.

== Plot ==
A respectable woman's position in society is threatened by a blackmailer.

== Cast ==
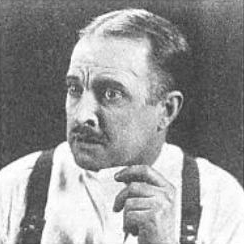
Franklyn Bellamy as Jaspar Murgatroyd

- Anny Ondra as Angela Clifford
- Trilby Clark as Poppy Stone
- Franklyn Bellamy as Jaspar Murgatroyd
- Haddon Mason as Geoffrey Vance
- Marie Ault as Hannah
- Julian Royce as Duke
- Bernard Vaughan as Butler
- Antoinette Brough as Mary Robbins
- Annie Esmond as Minor role

== Bibliography ==
- Low, Rachel. The History of British Film: Volume IV, 1918–1929. Routledge, 1997.
