= Member of the Jury =

- Directed by: Bernard Mainwaring
- Written by: David Evans
- Based on: novel by John Millard
- Produced by: John Findlay
- Starring: Ellis Irving; Marjorie Hume; Franklyn Bellamy
- Production company: Fox-British Pictures
- Distributed by: Twentieth Century Fox
- Release date: 1937
- Running time: 61 minutes
- Country: United Kingdom
- Language: English

Member of the Jury is a 1937 British crime film directed by Bernard Mainwaring and starring Ellis Irving, Marjorie Hume and Franklyn Bellamy. It was written by David Evans based on the 1933 novel by John Millard, and was made at Wembley Studios as a quota quickie.

== Plot ==
After a long spell of unemployment Walter Maitland gets a job with Sir John Sloane. On Maitland's first day work of, Sir John is arrested on for murder, and – coincidentally – Maitland is picked for jury service at his trial. Since he knows that his job depends on Sir John's acquittal, Maitland refuses to convict him, until he is finally able to reconstruct the case so that Sir John's innocence is demonstrated.

== Cast ==
- Ellis Irving as Walter Maitland
- Marjorie Hume as Mary Maitland
- Franklyn Bellamy as Sir John Sloane
- Arnold Lucy as uncle
- Roy Russell as Attorney General
- Aubrey Pollock as Defence
- W.E. Holloway as Judge

== Reception ==
The Monthly Film Bulletin wrote: "The long arm of coincidence plays a leading part in this unconvincing and artificial story. The dilemma in which the chief character finds himself is a real one, but lack of firm direction results in a frittering away of interest in a welter of trivial incidents and irrelevant details. The dialogue is feeble, and the acting stilted."

Kine Weekly wrote: "Trial drama too conflicting in its testimony and closely related to theatrical coincidence to interest other than unsophisticated audiences. Although the film is never true to life, it might have been good theatre had the producer put fundamentals before fictitious furbelows."

The Daily Film Renter wrote: "The long arm of coincidence is stretched almost to its limits in this unconvincing story, while legal procedure is not always believable, and dialogue frequently trite. The Old Bailey setting is good, but judge and clerk of the court are made to appear stock figures unlikely to strike a note of realism. The acting is undistinguished, save, perhaps, for an unnamed artiste who gives a deft study of a newspaper-seller called upon by the defence."
