= Anny Ondra =

Czech actress (1902–1987)

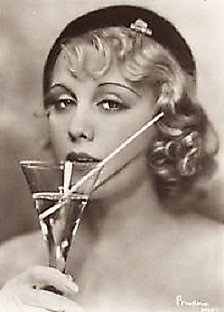
- Portrait photograph by Alexander Binder c. 1928
- Born: Anna Sophie Ondráková; 15 May 1902; Tarnów, Galicia, Austria–Hungary (now Poland)
- Died: 28 February 1987 (aged 84); Hollenstedt, West Germany
- Burial place: Saint Andreas Friedhof, Hollenstedt, Germany
- Occupation: Actress
- Years active: 1919–1957
- Spouse: Max Schmeling (m. 1933)
- Partner: Karel Lamač

Anny Ondra (born Anna Sophie Ondráková; 15 May 1902 – 28 February 1987) was a Czech film actress and producer who worked in Czech, German, Austrian, French and British cinema.

Ondra became one of the leading comic actresses of Czechoslovak cinema in the early 1920s, particularly through her films with actor and director Karel Lamač. She appeared in Austrian productions from 1922 and established an international career during the later 1920s. After beginning to work regularly in German films in 1926, she became one of the most popular Czech-born actresses in the German film industry. In Britain, she starred in one of the first British sound feature films, Blackmail (1929), directed by Alfred Hitchcock, and has been described as the first "Hitchcock blonde". Her popularity in Germany peaked in the mid-1930s, when she appeared in major Ufa productions and was regularly featured in film-industry publicity and the popular press. She continued to appear in films until 1957.

Her career was largely associated with comic and light roles, although she occasionally undertook more substantial dramatic parts. Ondra, together with Lamač, screenwriter Václav Wasserman and cinematographer Otto Heller, formed what was known as the "Great Four" of interwar Czech cinema. She co-produced several films in Germany in the 1930s.

In 1933, she married German former European and world boxing champion Max Schmeling, with whom she lived in Germany until her death. They were a prominent celebrity couple in 1930s Germany, appearing at many official occasions and associating with high-ranking Nazis, although they did not give political speeches or endorsements for the regime. After the Second World War, both faced allegations of collaboration with Nazi Germany. Schmeling underwent denazification proceedings and was classified as exonerated; Ondra's own postwar status is unclear.

== Early life and theatre ==
Ondra was born Anna Sophie Ondráková on 15 May 1902 (Note: Many sources incorrectly give her birth year as 1903. Ondra herself was inconsistent with the year.) in Tarnów, Galicia, to Czech parents. Her father, Bohumír Ondrák (1853–1926), was an officer in the Austro-Hungarian Army and later chief administrator of military warehouses. Her mother, Anna Ondráková (née Mračková, 1872–1935), was the daughter of a forester. Anna had two older brothers, Bohumír (b. 1895) and František (b. 1897).

She spent her childhood in Tarnów, Pula, Terezín and, from 1913, Prague, where she attended a Catholic Ursuline convent school (klášterní školu voršilek). During the school holidays, she visited her maternal grandparents in Moravia. For several years, she devoted herself to ballet, and as a young girl she also performed in the theatre, including the role of Kadéga in Frank Wedekind's play Pandora's Box (Die Büchse der Pandora). Jiří Nedošinský, the husband of the actress Antonie Nedošinská, discovered her and introduced her to professional theatre. At the beginning of her career, she also used the pseudonym Ossia Valdová. At that time, she performed at the Švanda Theatre in Smíchov, Prague, where she met director and actor Karel Lamač, who became her then boyfriend.

== Film career ==
=== Silent films and Czech cinema ===
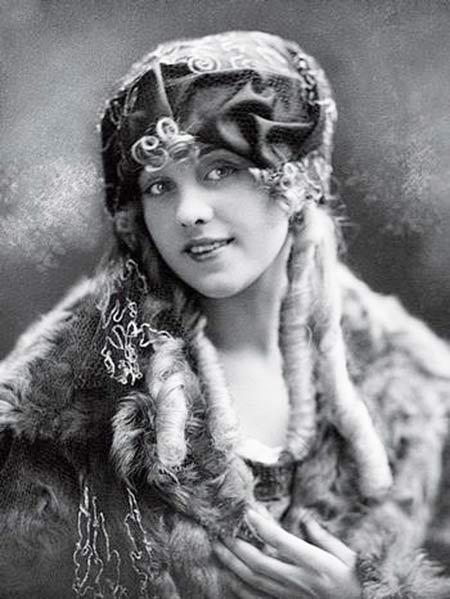
Portrait of a very young Anny Ondra, published in the USA prior to 1923

In a 1934 interview in Kinorevue, Ondra remembered, "[a]lthough I was a good student, the school wasn't happy with me because of my lively temperament. The nuns even insisted that I would never amount to anything ... I swim like a fish, ride like a cowboy, and I'd love to put all of these talents to use on screen … I most enjoy playing spirited young girls, as this allows me to showcase not only my naturally cheerful disposition but also my athletic abilities."

She began her film acting career at the age of 17 in the film Palimpsest (1919), directed by Lamač. (Note: Some sources show Ondra in the cast list for the short German film Meschugge ist Trumpf (1914), but this is unconfirmed.) After the First World War, the profession of an actress was not socially respected by some in Czech society, and her father hoped that she would pursue a secure administrative career, reportedly as a postal clerk, so when her family found out about her acting and her relationship with Lamač, there was an argument with her parents. She moved out to live with Lamač, and only the success of the film Lady with the Small Foot (Dáma s malou nožkou) (1920) convinced her parents of her talent.

She spoke Czech, German, English, and French, which helped her later international film career. Her breakthrough was in the 1920 film Gilly in Prague for the First Time (Gilly poprvé v Praze). In the years that followed, she took on numerous film roles, mostly in ingénue parts, and became one of the most popular comediennes of Czech film, and a fashion icon. She starred in two Czech films released within a week of each other in 1921, The Arrival from the Darkness (Příchozí z temnot) and The Poisoned Light (Otrávené světlo), both directed by Jan S. Kolár. They were two of the first Czech films to achieve success in international distribution. In 1921 and 1922 she worked in Vienna and, with the Austrian company Sascha-Film, owned by Alexander Joseph "Sascha", Count Kolowrat-Krakowsky, she starred in successful situation comedies. The most significant film for her during this period was Gypsy Love (Zigeunerliebe) (1922). Other films included That Stone Right There (Tu ten kámen) (1923) and Karel Havlíček Borovský (1925).

Throughout the 1920s, she worked closely with Lamač through their joint film company Kalos-film, (Note: The company name was derived from the initials of the names Karel Lamač and Anna Ondráková (Karel – Anny – Lamač – Ondráková – Spol, the last word meaning Co.)) founded by Alfred Baštýř, a supporter of Czech cinema in Czechoslovakia during the 1920s. Lamač directed her in several silent films, acted with her in films directed by other filmmakers, and they continued to work together after her marriage.

=== British films ===
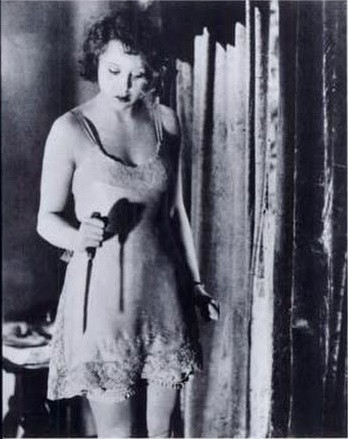
In Blackmail (1929)

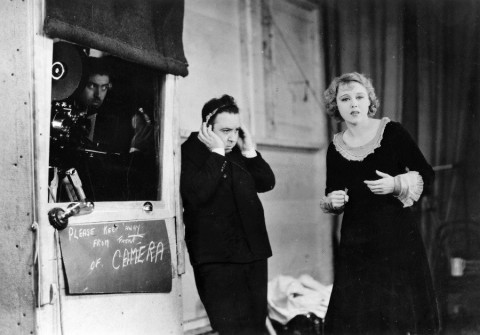
Hitchcock and Ondra during a sound test for Blackmail (1929)

After a few years of starring in various European productions, Ondra had become an international star, and her fame had outgrown the possibilities of the Czech domestic market. She worked in Germany and Austria during 1925 and 1926, and in 1927, she was approached by producers from England, where she appeared in four dramas. Despite The Film Daily describing her usual roles as "the little hoyden who worms herself into a series of complications" in romantic comedies, her British films were darker in tone. The first two, God's Clay and Glorious Youth (both 1928) were directed by Graham Cutts. In God's Clay, she plays a woman involved in a murder and its concealment, a part in which, according to a review in The Bioscope, she "makes a promising appearance" albeit given to overacting.

Her most notable appearances were in Alfred Hitchcock's The Manxman and Blackmail (both 1929), in which her characters were the first "Hitchcock blondes", that is, beautiful, haunted, and caught in a web of guilt or peril. In the latter film, she stabs a potential rapist to death in self-defence. Blackmail was started as a silent film; in the course of production, it was decided to make it what is frequently cited as the first British sound feature film. A minute-long test film where Ondra speaks English has survived, in which Hitchcock teases her to get an emotional response by asking if she is a "bad woman" and if she slept with men, making her laugh with embarrassment. Her accent was considered unacceptably strong and unsuited to her role as the daughter of a London tobacconist/newsagent, but Hitchcock did not want to do without her as an actress, so he had her part dubbed by British actress Joan Barry. The dubbing took place in an unusual way: Ondra moved her lips, and Barry spoke the text outside the picture. However, despite the film's being one of the most successful releases of that year and receiving critical praise, Ondra made no further films in Britain. It is said that the Hitchcocks visited her every time they were in Germany, and she sent them cards every Christmas.

=== German and other European films ===
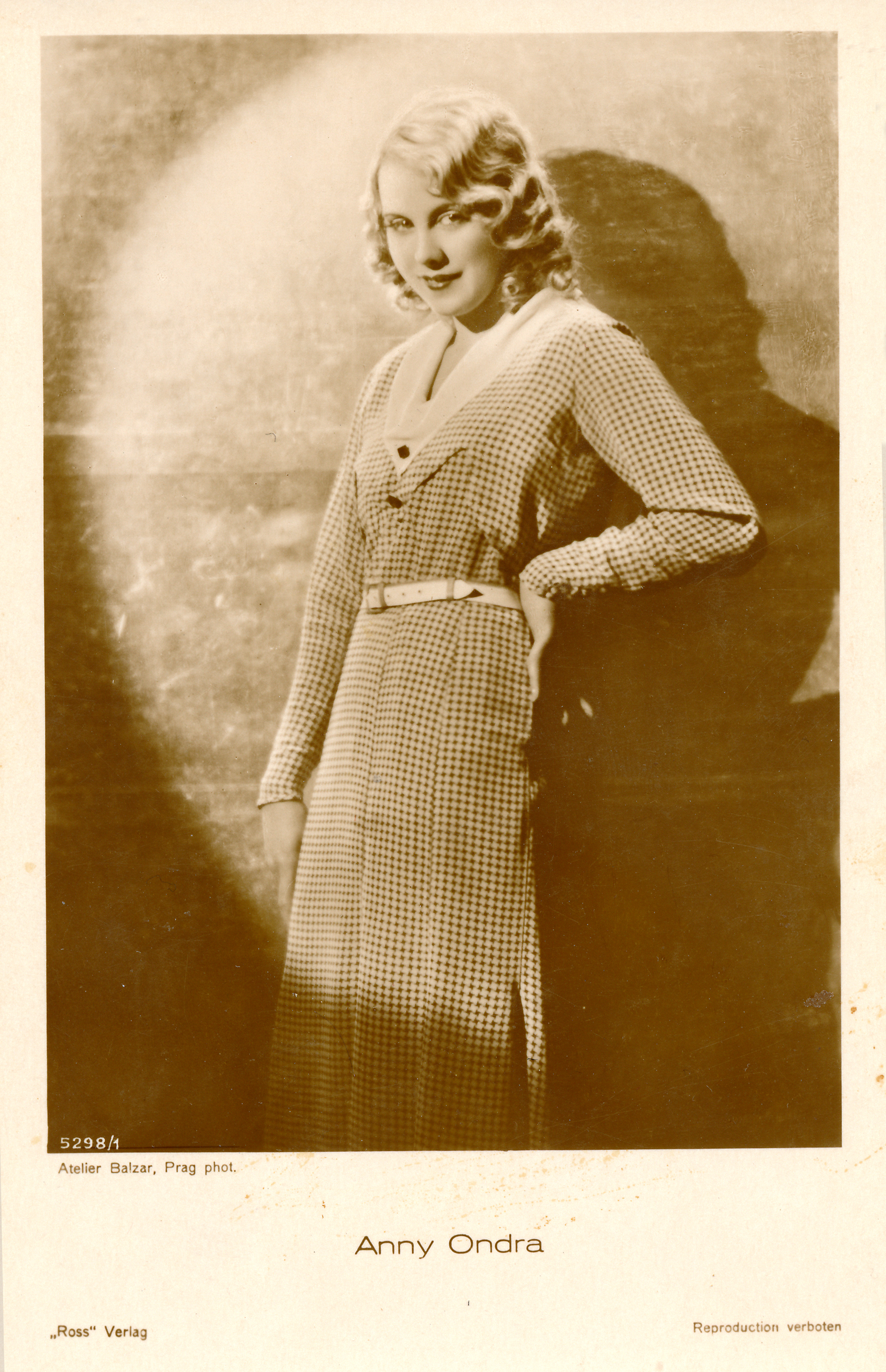
Postcard portrait by Jaroslav Balzar, 1930

Ondra became popular in the Austrian and German markets with the films Die Pratermizzi (1926), Eve's Daughters (Evas Töchter) (1928) and Sinful and Sweet (Sündig und süß) (1929), going on to make some forty more films in the sound era. The first sound-film role in which she spoke her own dialogue was Fairground People (Die vom Rummelplatz) (1930), titled Sensation (Sensace) in Czechoslovakia. Over the course of her career, she played dozens of roles in German and Austrian films, and made a few appearances in Czech sound films. Some of the Czech sound films in which she featured were also produced in foreign-language versions, and she appeared in several French films. Her popularity in Germany peaked in the mid-1930s, during which time she played the lead in big-budget Ufa productions.

From 1930, Ondra also worked as a film producer in partnership with Lamač, and they founded the Berlin-based production company Ondra-Lamac-Film GmbH. Ondra-Lamač-Film produced exclusively sound films, and Ondra was credited as co-producer of several films beginning with Fairground People.

The creative team of Anny Ondra, Karel Lamač, cinematographer Otto Heller, and screenwriter, film actor and director Václav Wasserman were sometimes referred to as "the Great Four" of interwar Czech film.

Her final Czech-language film was the comedy Cause for Divorce (Důvod k rozvodu) (1937), in which she appeared alongside Oldřich Nový and Adina Mandlová. She subsequently continued her career in German-language films.

Ondra continued acting in popular German comedy films throughout the 1930s and early 1940s, usually in the role of a "nice and capricious young girl". While her films were standard commercial entertainment produced within the heavily controlled German film industry rather than explicit political propaganda, all film production in Germany at the time fell under the oversight of Joseph Goebbels's Reich Ministry of Public Enlightenment and Propaganda. She retired from filmmaking in 1943, apart from an appearance in the West German musical You Have to Be Beautiful (Schön muss man sein) (1951), and a cameo performance as herself in The Zürich Engagement (Die Zürcher Verlobung) (1957). Her filmography comprises over ninety roles.

=== Film image and character ===
Ondra's appearance was an important part of her star image. She became known in the press for her slim legs, which were emphasised in films such as Lady with the Small Foot. She also helped cultivate this image by posing for studio photographs in shorts and short skirts. In 1931, German film publicity advertised her as "the girl with the beautiful legs" ("das Mädel mit den schönen Beinen").

According to Deutsche Biographie, "[t]hrough a style of grotesque comedy–which earned her the label of a "female Buster Keaton"–as well as frenetic physical movement and dance sequences, she was able to transcend the confines of the demure, maidenly ideal. Small in stature, slender, and light-footed, she exuded a mischievous, sprite-like charm. Her characters were proactive; they sought out and won the men of their hearts, often displaying a blend of coquetry and self-deprecating irony … Along with contemporaries such as Käthe von Nagy and Carola Neher, O[ndra] helped define a fashionable, youthful, androgynous, and emancipated female archetype characteristic of the late 1920s."

The Deutsches Filminstitut & Filmmuseum comments that "[i]n her films of the 1920s, the age of flappers, "It"- girls, and jazz babes, Anny Ondra stood for agility, exuberant talent, silliness, and self-deprecating humor."

German-born writer, art and film theorist Rudolf Arnheim wrote, "[s]he possessed something of Buster Keaton's cool beauty and his acrobatic and dance-like talent."

Czech film actor Otomar Korbelář said, "[s]he was like quicksilver; even during breaks in filming, no one could keep her still–yet she remained ever fresh, as if hungry for both life and work. And she was very pretty, with curly blonde hair. Even when she was supposed to look serious, she seemed to be wearing a mischievous smile. You never knew if she might be about to play some prank on you. She had a delightful way with words–never mean-spirited, but rather endearingly childlike."

In the opinion of Václav Wasserman, "Anny Ondráková wasn't just a gifted actress– she was a personality!"

A short obituary by the Association of Jewish Refugees in Great Britain recalls that "in the early Thirties … she was loved by a wide audience."

== Personal life ==
=== Relationship with Karel Lamač ===
Ondra and Lamač were romantically involved for several years and remained lifelong friends after their relationship ended. According to some later Czech biographical accounts, Ondra wanted to marry and start a family with him, but Lamač repeatedly deferred marriage, reportedly citing his professional commitments. (Note: Some biographical sources state that Ondra and Lamač married at some point, and were divorced in 1933, without providing evidence for the claims.)

=== Marriage to Max Schmeling ===
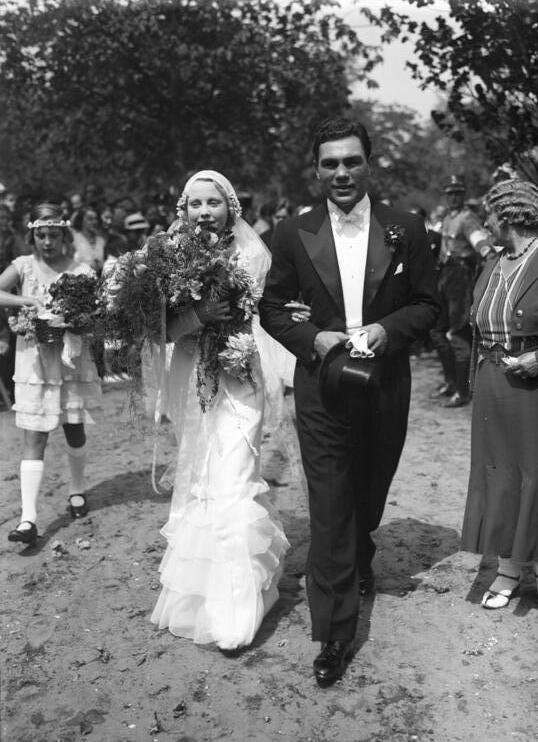
Wedding of Anny Ondra and Max Schmeling (1933)

In 1930, she was introduced to the German boxer Max Schmeling, who was later the world heavyweight champion from 1930 to 1932, becoming a national hero as the first German to hold the title. They were officially married on 6 July 1933, with a religious ceremony following on 20 July 1933, in Bad Saarow, Brandenburg. (Note: In 1933 Schmeling bought a summer house in Bad Saarow which had previously belonged to the expressionist painter Bruno Krauskopf, who emigrated after his works were denounced by the Nazi Party as "degenerate art".) Their marriage was a close one, and lasted 54 years.

Ondra and Schmeling appeared together in the film Knockout (Knockout – Ein Junges Mädchen, ein Junger Mann) (1935), and she subsequently moved to Germany to live with him. Her friend Lída Baarová later recalled that in 1936, three years into their marriage, Ondra miscarried after a car accident.

Sometime after Schmeling's high-profile return from the United States in 1936, where he had knocked out American rising star Joe Louis, the couple faced another misfortune: their relatively new home in Bad Saarow, built in 1933, burned down. Ondra later admitted that she had to stage a little scene to dissuade Schmeling from making dangerous attempts to rescue the household belongings. As a result, however, they lost some of their family possessions.

=== Ondra and Schmeling's life under the Nazi regime ===
Anny Ondra, Max Schmeling and Hitler after Schmeling's victory over Joe Louis in 1936

==== Public image and association with the regime ====
They became a popular and prominent couple in Germany during the 1930s. The Nazis sought to use their popularity for propaganda purposes and, as high-profile celebrities, they were photographed at official events and with Nazi leaders. The couple did not give political speeches or endorsements of the Nazi party, but they could not prevent their exploitation. As early as their wedding, Adolf Hitler had sent them a large floral arrangement and a tree sapling. Ondra remained focused on film production and performance. Because of Schmeling's status as a sporting hero and hers as an international film star, they were occasionally present at official state events and functions, including social gatherings hosted by regime officials like Joseph Goebbels. In Nazi propaganda, they were often shown in photos with Goebbels and Hitler, with Schmeling portrayed as a German Übermensch (superman), and Ondra as a blonde Aryan, despite her Slavic origins and Czech nationality.

According to Goebbels's diary, Ondra sat up through the night of 19–20 June 1936 with him and his wife, listening to the live shortwave radio commentary of Schmeling's first, victorious, fight against Joe Louis in New York. However, after Schmeling lost his rematch against Joe Louis in June 1938 for the undisputed world heavyweight championship, a contest regarded by the Nazis as a battle between a Nordic hero and an inferior black race, he attracted hostile attention from the Nazi regime. Ondra continued to appear in German films, although her screen appearances became less frequent in the following years.

==== Schmeling's wartime conduct ====
Schmeling was repeatedly offered membership in the Nazi Party as well as Nazi decorations, but he consistently refused. He also refused Nazi pressure to terminate his relationship with his Jewish boxing manager, Joe Jacobs. He was ultimately conscripted into the army, despite being well past the age for military service, was assigned to an anti-aircraft unit in East Prussia, and later underwent training as a paratrooper. He took part in the invasion of Crete in May 1941 where he was wounded, contracted dysentery, and nearly died. While in a field hospital, he gave an interview to an American journalist, which infuriated Goebbels.

In 1989, it was made public that, during the Kristallnacht pogroms in November 1938, Schmeling had hidden two Jewish teenage brothers, Henri and Werner Lewin, in his Berlin hotel room and then helped them leave Germany, in defiance of the Nazi regime and placing him at considerable risk from the authorities.

==== Postwar allegations and denazification ====
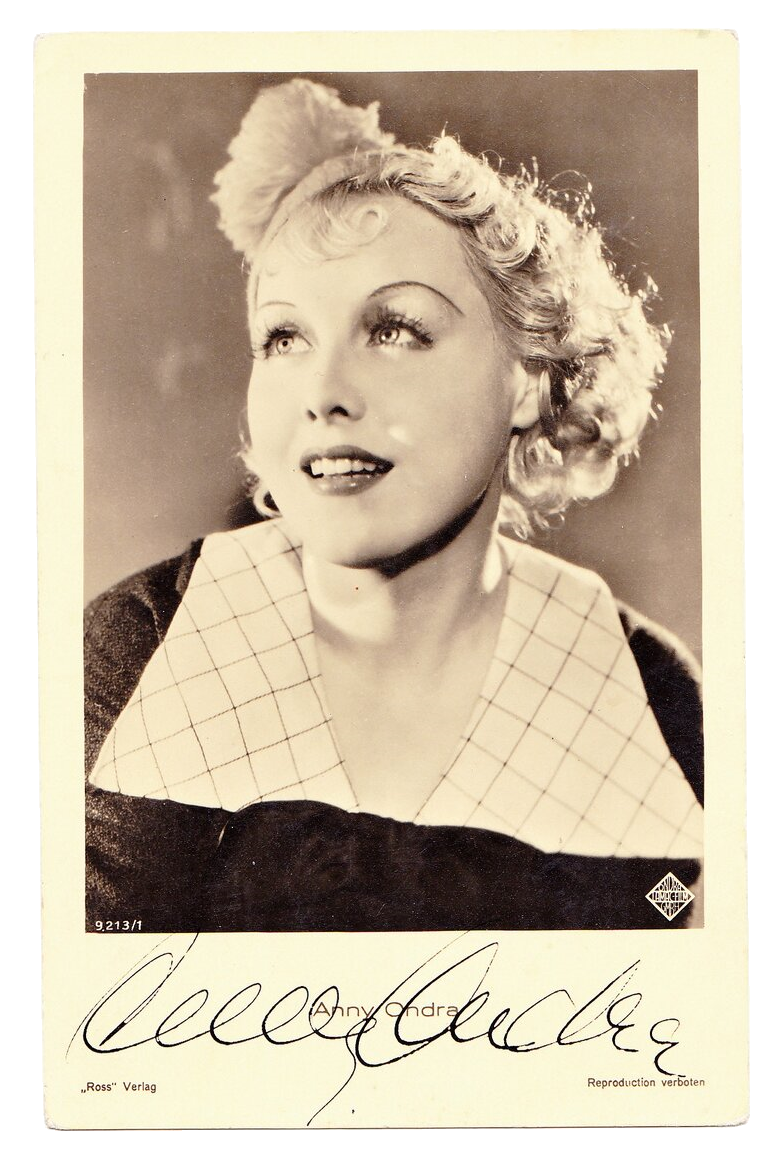
Signed promotional postcard, posted 5 May 1937

The assessment of David Margolick, who has written extensively about Schmeling's wartime record and postwar reputation, is that although loyal to Jews he knew personally, during the war years Schmeling showed "microcourage and macrocowardice", and that he "never said any more than he had to to stay in the Nazis' good graces. He did not spout Nazi rhetoric or wrap himself in the swastika." Though, "[w]henever the Nazis asked him to pitch in, he obliged." Ondra's actions are less clear, and Margolick's analysis cannot automatically be transferred to her.

After Germany's defeat the couple were suspected of collaboration, documented in a file in their joint names. In Western Allied-occupied Germany, Schmeling underwent denazification (Entnazifizierung) proceedings, and was cleared of political collaboration with the Nazi regime and classified as exonerated (Entlastete). Whether Ondra was questioned and her final status is unknown. Separately and unrelated to the collaboration investigation, on 13 May 1946, a military court sentenced Schmeling to three months in prison and a fine of 10,000 Reichsmarks for failing to comply with building regulations while constructing a house for himself and his wife. He was required to pay the fine and serve the full term of imprisonment.

Some Czech accounts report that a Czechoslovak arrest warrant for collaboration was issued against Ondra after the war; other accounts report that both Ondra and Schmeling faced postwar accusations of collaboration. The subsequent legal status of any warrant for Ondra is unknown. This accusation, and the rise to power of the Communist regime in Czechoslovakia in 1948, made it unlikely she could safely return to her country of birth, and she lived in West Germany afterwards.

=== Later life and death ===
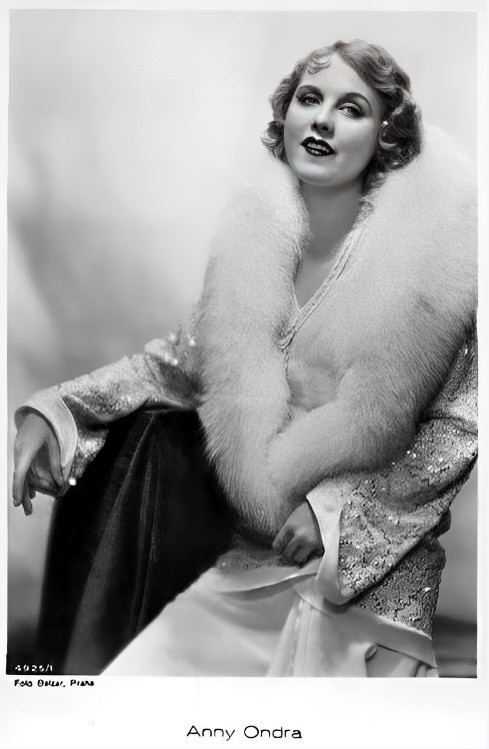
Postcard portrait by Jaroslav Balzar, c. 1930

After the war, the couple was left without funds or property. In 1949, they moved to Hollenstedt, near Hamburg. Together, they started a mink farm business on their land. Later, Schmeling became a senior manager at the Coca-Cola Company. From April 1952, Ondra and Schmeling lived in Styria, Austria; Lamač remained her friend throughout his lifetime, and it was there that they received the news of his death on 2 August 1952 in Hamburg. They managed to return in time to attend his funeral.

Ondra never returned to Czechoslovakia, though she often reminisced about it. In 1965, the magazine Kino published a unique interview with Ondra, in which she looked back nostalgically on her homeland, her relatives, and her friends:

I often think back to home, to Moravia, where I used to spend my school holidays … I have relatives there, and a few acquaintances in Prague, Václav Wasserman, for instance, though many have since passed away … I would love to visit Czechoslovakia and talk with friends, directors, and actors. Perhaps they haven't forgotten me entirely. After all, I've been here in Germany for 37 years now. I'll be quite nervous when I arrive in Prague; my Czech isn't what it used to be–my husband, for example, only knows how to say 'How are you?' in Czech. Still, I'm confident that I'll soon find my flow again. It's only natural that I might get a bit emotional. Later, we can talk at length about everything that's so difficult to put into writing …

— Anny Ondráková, "An Interview Across Decades and Hundreds of Kilometres", Kino (1965)

Ondra and Schmeling's marriage was a happy one, although childless. According to the Schmeling Foundation, "[t]hroughout her life, Anny was lovingly cared for by her Max. The secret to this perfect marriage was the respectful way they treated one another. Arguments between the two were rare. Max and Anny slept in separate rooms; she preferred a palatial bedchamber, while Max lived somewhat more modestly in a simply furnished room. Each in their own space, yet united nonetheless."

She died on 28 February 1987, in Hollenstedt, West Germany, where she is buried in the Catholic Saint Andreas Friedhof cemetery.

In 1997, her husband sent 30,000 marks to the Czech Republic to help address the damage caused by devastating floods. Schmeling died in 2005 and was buried next to her. In accordance with their wishes, the estate of Anna Ondráková and Max Schmeling was bequeathed to a foundation bearing Schmeling's name, the Max Schmeling Stiftung. They also left a significant portion to the SOS Children's Villages organisation.

== Awards ==
In 1970 Ondra was given the Honorary German Film Award for "long-standing and outstanding work in German film".

== Portrayals on screen and stage ==
Ondra was portrayed by Britt Ekland in the television film Ring of Passion (1978), in which her character was named Amy Ondra Schmeling. She was also portrayed by Peta Wilson in the docudrama Joe and Max (2002) and by Susanne Wuest in Max Schmeling (2010).

In the 2008 stage musical Der Kampf des Jahrhunderts – Max Schmeling gegen Joe Louis (The Fight of the Century – Max Schmeling vs. Joe Louis), Ondra became "Lada Kummar".

== Partial filmography ==
List does not include short films, or films which Ondra produced but did not appear in.

Year	Title	Role	Language/Format	Notes
1919	Palimpsest	—	Silent	
1920	Lady with the Small Foot (Dáma s malou nožkou)	Dandy's friend	Silent	with Karel Lamač
1920	Gilly in Prague for the First Time (Gilly poprvé v Praze)	Girl	Silent	with Karel Lamač
1920	The Song of Gold (Zpěv zlata)	Andrea Dombsová, the director's niece	Silent	Lost film
1921	The Arrival from the Darkness (Příchozí z temnot)	Dagmar/Alena	Silent	Surviving film is incomplete
1921	The Poisoned Light (Otrávené světlo)	Grant's daughter Anny	Silent	with Karel Lamač
1922	Look After Your Daughters (Hütet eure Töchter)	—	Silent	
1922	Gypsy Love (Zigeunerliebe)	—	Silent	
1922	Lead Us Not into Temptation (Führe uns nicht in Versuchung)	—	Silent	
1923	That Stone Right There (Tu ten kámen)	Aenny	Silent	
1923	The Kidnapping of Fux the Banker (Únos bankéře Fuxe)	Fux's daughter Daisy	Silent	Surviving film is incomplete
1923	The Man Without a Heart (Der Mann ohne Herz)	An American	Silent	
1924	White Paradise (Bílý ráj)	Nina Mirelová	Silent	
1924	Sins in Marriage (Hříchy v manželství)	—	Silent	
1925	I Love You (Ich liebe Dich)	Helen Adelström	Silent	
1925	Catch Him! (Chyťte ho!)	Lilly Wardová	Silent	with Karel Lamač
1925	Into the Estate of the Lords (Do panského stavu)	Kráčmerka's niece	Silent	
1925	Karel Havlíček Borovský	Fanny Weidenhofferová	Silent	
1926	The Countess from Podskalí (Hraběnka z Podskalí)	Liduška	Silent	with Karel Lamač. Lost film
1926	Trude (Trude, die Sechzehnjährige) a.k.a. The Little Thingamajig (Die kleine Dingsda)	Marie	Silent	
1926	Never the Twain (Velbloud uchem jehly)	Zuzka Pestová / Lili Weberová	Silent	with Karel Lamač
1927	Die Pratermizzi	Pratermizzi	Silent	
1927	Old Man Bezoušek (Pantáta Bezoušek)	Melanka	Silent	
1927	His Highness, the Professional Dance Partner (Seine Hoheit, der Eintänzer) (Austria) a.k.a. Hotel Archduchess Viktoria (Hotel Erzherzogin Viktoria) (Germany)	Steffi Haidegger	Silent	
1927	Anička, Come Back! (Aničko, vrať se!)	Anicka Karesová	Silent	
1927	A Flower from Šumava (Květ ze Šumavy)	Dáňa	Silent	
1927	The Lovers of an Old Criminal (Milenky starého kriminálníka)	Fifi Hrazánková	Silent	with Vlasta Burian
1928	Eve's Daughters (Dcery Eviny)	Nina Laval / Anny de Lavais	Silent	
1928	God's Clay	Angela Clifford	Silent	Directed by Graham Cutts
1928	Glorious Youth	Eileen	Silent	Directed by Graham Cutts
1928	The First Kiss (Der erste Kuß)	Anny Cord	Silent	
1928	Suzy Saxophone (Saxophon-Susi)	Anni von Aspen	Silent	
1929	The Manxman	Kate Cregeen	Silent	Directed by Alfred Hitchcock
1929	Blackmail	Alice White	English	Directed by Alfred Hitchcock
1929	The Girl with the Whip (Das Mädel mit der Peitsche)	Anny Nebenkrug	Silent	
1929	Sinful and Sweet (Sündig und süß)	Musette	Silent	
1930	The Caviar Princess (Die Kaviarprinzessin)	Annemarie	Silent	
1930	The Girl from the U.S.A. (Das Mädel aus U.S.A.)	Annemarie	German	
1930	Fairground People (German: Die vom Rummelplatz a.k.a. Das Micky-Maus-Girl) a.k.a. Sensation (Czech: Sensace)	Anny Flock	German	Producer
1930	The Great Longing (Die große Sehnsucht)	As herself	German	
1930	A Friend As Sweet As You (Eine Freundin, so goldig wie Du)	Anny	German	Producer
1931	Him and His Sister (On a jeho sestra)	Anny Brabcová	Czech	with Vlasta Burian. Producer
1931	Him and His Sister (Er und seine Schwester)	Anny Spatz	German	with Vlasta Burian. Producer
1931	Die Fledermaus	Adele	German	with Iván Petrovich and Georg Alexander
1931	Woe If He Is Let Loose (Wehe, wenn er losgelassen)	Secretary Mana	German	Producer
1932	Mamsell Nitouche	Mamsell Nitouche	German	with Georg Alexander. Producer
1932	A Night in Paradise (Eine Nacht im Paradies)	Monika Böhnicke	German	with Hermann Thimig. Producer
1932	A Night in Paradise (Une nuit au paradis)	Monique Béchue	French	Producer
1932	The Bat (La Chauve-Souris)	Arlette	French	with Iván Petrovich. Producer
1932	Should We Wed Them? (Faut-il les marier ?)	Anny	French	with Jean-Pierre Aumont. Producer
1932	The Cruel Mistress (Die grausame Freundin)	Welgunda	German	Producer
1932	Kiki	Kiki	German	with Hermann Thimig. Producer
1932	Kiki	Kiki	French	with Pierre Richard-Willm. Producer
1932	Baby	Baby	German	with Anton Walbrook
1933	Baby	Baby	French	with Pierre Richard-Willm
1933	The Ideal Schoolmaster (Kantor Ideál)	Věra Matysová	Czech	
1933	Daughter of the Regiment (Die Tochter des Regiments)	Mary Dreizehn	German	Producer
1933	Daughter of the Regiment (La fille du regiment)	Mary	French	with Pierre Richard-Willm. Producer
1933	Miss Hoffmann's Tales (Fräulein Hoffmanns Erzählungen)	Anita Limann	German	with Mathias Wieman. Producer
1933	The Love Hotel (Das verliebte Hotel)	Hanne Boll	German	with Mathias Wieman. Producer
1934	The Switched Bride (Die vertauschte Braut)	Virginia Vanderloo / Dolly	German	with Anton Walbrook. Producer
1934	Love in a Cage (L'amour en cage)	The Baroness de Rèze / Anny	French	Producer
1934	Little Dorrit (Klein Dorrit)	Amy Dorrit	German	with Mathias Wieman. Producer
1934	Polish Blood (Polenblut)	Helena Zaremba	German	with Hans Moser and Iván Petrovich. Producer
1934	Polish Blood (Polská krev)	Helena Zarembová	Czech	Producer
1935	Knockout (Knockout – Ein Junges Mädchen, ein Junger Mann)	Marianne Plümke	German	with her husband Max Schmeling. Producer
1935	Deep Cleaning (Großreinemachen)	Bessie	German	with Wolf Albach-Retty. Producer
1935	The Young Count (Der junge Graf)	Billy	German	with Hans Söhnker. Producer
1936	Donogoo Tonka. The Mysterious City (Donogoo Tonka. Die geheimnisvolle Stadt)	Josette	German	Directed by Reinhold Schünzel
1936	Honeymoon (Flitterwochen)	Ingeborg	German	with Hans Söhnker. Producer
1937	A Girl from the Chorus (Ein Mädel vom Ballett)	Henriette Lange	German	Producer
1937	Beware of Love (Vor Liebe wird gewarnt)	Anny Palme	German	Producer
1937	Cause for Divorce (Der Scheidungsgrund)	Anny	German	Producer
1937	Cause for Divorce (Důvod k rozvodu)	Anny Plavcova	Czech	
1937	The Irresistible Man (Der Unwiderstehliche)	Claudette Renier	German	with Hans Söhnker
1938	Fools in the Snow (Narren im Schnee)	Dorothee Heinemann	German	
1941	The Gasman (Der Gasmann)	Erika Knittel	German	with Heinz Rühmann
1943	Heaven, We Inherit a Castle (Himmel, wir erben ein Schloß)	Karla Schreyvogel	German	
1951	You Have to be Beautiful (Schön muß man sein)	Rose de Lila	German	with Sonja Ziemann
1957	The Zurich Engagement (Die Zürcher Verlobung)	As herself	German	with Liselotte Pulver

== Bibliography ==
- Brož, Jaroslav; Frída, Myrtil (1966). Historie československého filmu v obrazech 1930–1945 [A History of Czechoslovak Film in Images 1930–1945] (in Czech). Prague: Orbis. pp. 13, 20, 70, 71, 82, 111., photos 166, 167, 169, 207, 280
- Dumschat, Sabine. "I have seen something ..." Max Schmeling, die Boxerlegende, und seine Frau, die Filmschauspielerin Anny Ondra Tabellarische Lebensläufe mit einem Inventar wichtiger Archivalien des Bundesarchivs: Fotos, Filme, Wochenschauen, Akten und Zeitungsartikel zusammengestellt von Sabine Dumschat ["I have seen something..." Max Schmeling, the boxing legend, and his wife, the film actress Anny Ondra Biographical timelines, including an inventory of key archival materials from the German Federal Archives (Bundesarchiv)–photographs, films, newsreels, official records, and newspaper articles–compiled by Sabine Dumschat] (PDF) (in German).
- Friedrichová, Dorothea (2003). Anny Ondráková a Max Schmeling [Anny Ondráková and Max Schmeling] (in Czech). Prague: Ikar. ISBN 80-249-0239-7.
- Johnson, Kevin B. (2012). Annexation Effects: Cultural Appropriation and the Politics of Place in Czech-German Films, 1930-1945 (PhD thesis). Seattle: University of Washington.
- Johnson, Kevin B. (2021). "Chapter 10 - Foreign Attractions: Czech Stars and Ethnic Masquerade". Continuity and Crisis in German Cinema, 1928-1936. Boydell & Brewer. ISBN 9781782048435.
- Kasten, Jürgen (1999). "Ondra, Anny (eigentlich Anna Sophie Ondráková)" [Ondra, Anny (born Anna Sophie Ondráková)]. Deutsche Biographie (in German).
- Margolick, David (2005a). Beyond Glory: Joe Louis vs. Max Schmeling, and a World on the Brink (1 ed.). Alfred A. Knopf Inc. pp. 73–77, 131–134. ISBN 978-0375411922.
- Margolick, David (2 October 2005b). "In Germany, Selective Memories of Schmeling". The New York Times.
- Motl, Stanislav (2002). Prokletí Lídy Baarové : příběh české herečky ve světle nově objevených archivních dokumentů a autentických vzpomínek [The Curse of Lída Baarová: The Story of a Czech Actress in Light of Newly Discovered Archival Documents and Authentic Recollections] (in Czech). Prague: Rybka. pp. 43, 44, 60. ISBN 80-86182-61-4.
- Motl, Stanislav (2006). Mraky nad Barrandovem [Clouds over Barrandov] (in Czech). Prague: Rybka. pp. 42, 78–85. ISBN 80-86182-51-7.
- Nedvědová, Markéta (2014). Anny Ondráková: evropská kariéra začíná ve Vídni [Anny Ondráková: A European Career Begins in Vienna] (PDF) (Bachelor thesis) (in Czech). Brno: Masaryk University, Department of Film and Audiovisual Culture.
- Tunys, Ladislav (1998). Hodně si pamatuju: perličky v duši Raoula Schránila [I Remember a Great Deal: Pearls in the Soul of Raoul Schránil] (in Czech). Prague: Ametyst. pp. 155–156. ISBN 80-85837-35-8.
- Ornest, Ota; Valtrová, Marie (1993). Hraje váš tatínek ještě na housle? : rozhovor Marie Valtrové s Otou Ornestem [Does your father still play the violin? : an interview by Marie Valtrová with Ota Ornest] (in Czech). Prague. p. 142. ISBN 80-85625-19-9.
- Wolf, Milan (2006). Vlasta Burian v obrazech: Fotografie a dokumenty ze sbírky Milana Wolfa [Vlasta Burian in Pictures: Photographs and Documents from the Collection of Milan Wolf] (in Czech). Prague: Levné knihy KMa. p. 173. ISBN 80-7309-351-0.
