= Betty in Search of a Thrill =

1915 film by Phillips Smalley

Betty in Search of a Thrill (UK: The Merry Madcap)
- title of the film as released in UK. British poster with Elsie Janis and Owen Moore.
- Directed by: Phillips Smalley; Lois Weber
- Screenplay by: Elsie Janis
- Produced by: Hobart Bosworth
- Starring: Elsie Janis; Owen Moore; Juanita Hansen; Herbert Standing; Vera Lewis; Harry Ham
- Production companies: Hobart Bosworth Productions; Oliver Morosco Photoplay Company
- Distributed by: Paramount Pictures; Anchor Film Company (UK)
- Release date: May 17, 1915
- Running time: 5 reels
- Country: United States
- Language: Silent (English intertitles)

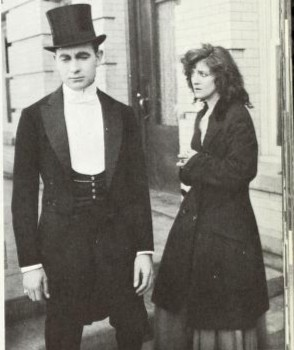
A scene in the film.

Betty in Search of a Thrill is a lost 1915 American silent adventure film that was directed by Phillips Smalley and Lois Weber and written by Elsie Janis. The film stars Elsie Janis, Owen Moore, Juanita Hansen, Herbert Standing, Vera Lewis, and Harry Ham. The film was released on May 17, 1915, by Paramount Pictures.

== Cast ==
- Elsie Janis as Betty
- Owen Moore as Jim Denning
- Juanita Hansen as June Hastings
- Herbert Standing as Mr. Hastings
- Vera Lewis as Mrs. Hastings
- Harry Ham as A Boarder
- Roberta Hickman as Maizie Folette
