= Maude Radford Warren =

Canadian author

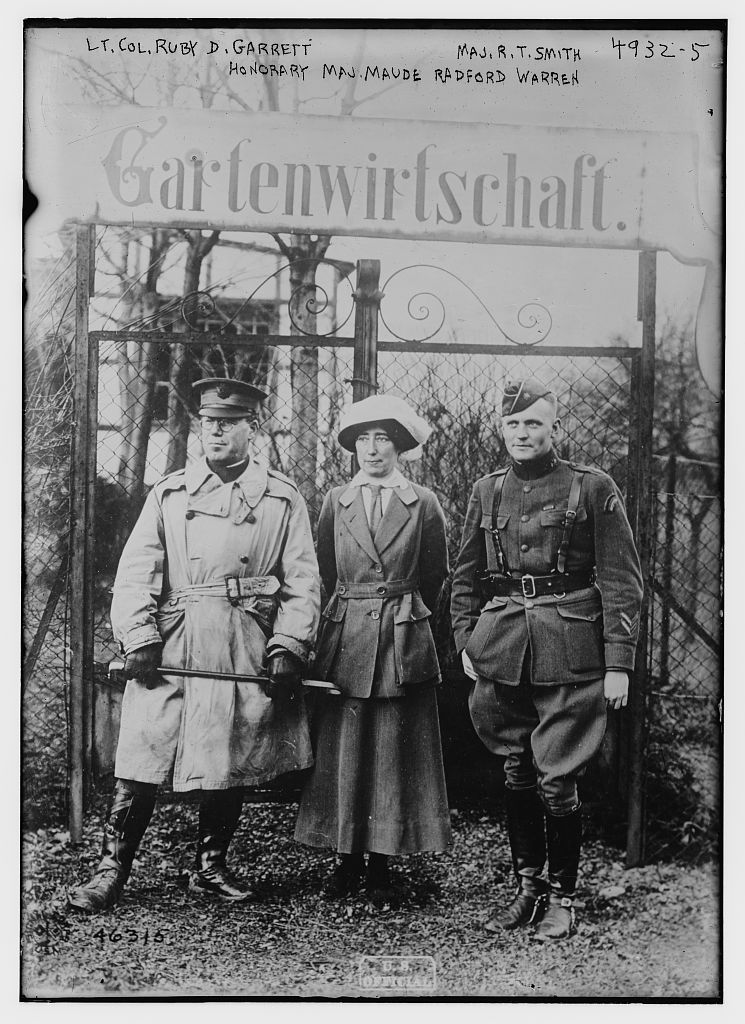
Lt. Col. Ruby Dwight Garrett, Honorary Maj. Maude Radford Warren, Maj. R.T. Smith In 1919

Maude Lavinia Radford Warren (née Radford; 1875–1934) was a Canadian author of children's literature and short fiction.

== Biography ==
Warren was born in 1875 in Wolfe Island, Ontario.

She was a war correspondent for the Saturday Evening Post.

She was also the author of many children's books, including King Arthur and His Knights, Robin Hood, Little Pioneers, and Indian Stories. Although a native of Canada, she was a graduate of the University of Chicago and taught in connection with the university. Her husband Joseph Parker Warren was a professor of the university.

Her fiction has been published by Harper Brothers, and she wrote for Woman's Home Companion, Harper's Magazine, the Saturday Evening Post, and Collier's.

Warren died of carbon monoxide poisoning in 1934, at the age of 59, while living in Ithaca, New York.
