= Yankel Kalich =

Yiddish theater actor, director (1891–1975)

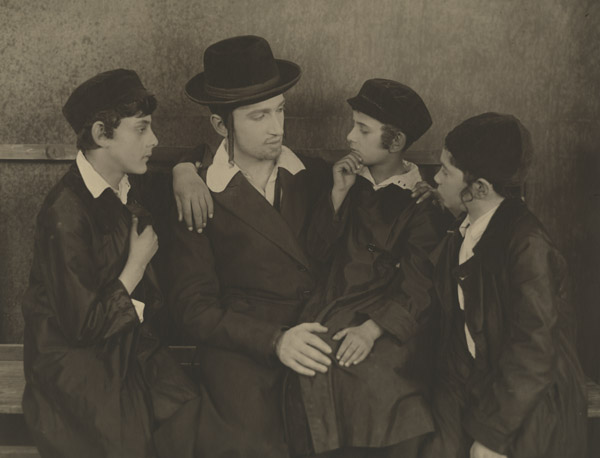
- Kalich, second from left, in Mezrach und Maarev (1921)
- Born: November 18, 1891
- Died: March 16, 1975 (aged 83); Mahopac, New York, US
- Other names: Jacob Kalich, Joseph Kalich

Yankel "Jacob" Kalich (Yiddish: יעקב קאַליך, 18 November 1891 – 16 March 1975) was a Yiddish theater actor, director, and producer.

Kalich was born in Rymanów, Galicia, Austria-Hungary in what is now Poland. He immigrated to America in 1914. He opened a theater in Philadelphia. He would go to New York to see Joseph Rumshinsky and would ask him for use of his operettas.

Kalish met actress Molly Picon when she was on the vaudeville circuit, stranded in Boston after an influenza epidemic had closed all the theaters. He hired her to work his Yiddish Theater Season at the Boston Opera House for two years. The couple married on June 29, 1919 in Philadelphia and then took a tour of Europe returning three years later with Picon being a woman "of international reputation." The couple began doing a daily radio show in 1934. Kalich later went on to produce and direct many productions that she was in including a biographical piece about Picon called Oy Is Dus a Lieben. The two of them toured doing Yiddish theater in Europe after World War II going "anywhere they could find an audience of survivors."

He made the transition from doing Yiddish theater to being in Hollywood films, playing the role of "Yankel" in Fiddler on the Roof.

== Personal life ==
Kalish and his wife Molly Picon lived on a 12-acre farm in Mahopac, New York. He died in 1975 in Mahopac. He is buried in the Yiddish Theatrical Alliance Plot within the Mount Hebron Cemetery in Flushing, New York.
