= The Zürich Engagement =

1957 film directed by Helmut Käutner

- Directed by: Helmut Käutner
- Written by: Barbara Noack (novel); Heinz Pauck; Helmut Käutner
- Produced by: Gyula Trebitsch
- Starring: Liselotte Pulver; Paul Hubschmid; Bernhard Wicki; Wolfgang Lukschy
- Cinematography: Heinz Pehlke
- Edited by: Klaus Dudenhöfer
- Music by: Michael Jary
- Production company: Gyula-Trebitsch-Film
- Distributed by: Europa Film
- Release date: 16 April 1957
- Running time: 106 minutes
- Country: West Germany
- Language: German

The Zürich Engagement (German: Die Zürcher Verlobung) is a 1957 West German comedy film directed by Helmut Käutner and starring Liselotte Pulver, Paul Hubschmid, and Bernhard Wicki.It is also known by the alternative title The Affairs of Julie.

It was shot at the Wandsbek Studios in Hamburg. The film's sets were designed by the art directors Albrecht Becker and Herbert Kirchhoff. The film is about a young woman working at a dentist's office falls in love with one of the patients. She writes down her fantasies about him, but problems arise when her notes are discovered and are turned into a screenplay for a new film.

== Plot ==
After an argument with her boyfriend Jürgen, the writer Juliane 'Julchen' Thomas seeks distance and comfort at her uncle Julius's Berlin home. A rude emergency patient nicknamed Büffel appears at his dentist's office. He is accompanied by his friend, the charming Zurich doctor Jean Berner, with whom Julchen falls instantly in love. A short time later, when Juliane presents a script telling this very story to a film production company, she meets Büffel, whose real name is Paul Frank and who is set to direct the film adaptation of her book.

Büffel seems to take a shine to Julchen. He sees through her announcement that she intends to get engaged in Zurich at Christmas. However, he offers to give her a ride to Zurich in his car, as he is traveling to St. Moritz with his son Pips for New Year's Eve. Hoping to meet Jean again there, Juliane accepts. To avoid getting off the train in Zurich, she invents a story during the journey that her engagement to a Mr. Uri has to be postponed because the father of the future groom has died unexpectedly. In St. Moritz, Juliane befriends Pips, and Jean joins them. Büffel, secretly amused by her fabricated stories, hires an unemployed actor, posing as the supposed Mr. Uri, to frame Juliane. Jean introduces Juliane to his conservative family, and Juliane soon realizes that she does not fit into this world and is in love with Büffel. Juliane and Jean part amicably, and Jean encourages Juliane to reveal herself to Büffel.

After further complications, Juliane and Büffel meet again in Hamburg to watch the finished film together. There is a happy ending, which pleases Pips, who can now return home from boarding school.

== Cast ==
- Liselotte Pulver as Juliane Thomas
- Paul Hubschmid as Dr. Jean Berner
- Bernhard Wicki as Paul Frank
- Wolfgang Lukschy as Jürgen Kolbe
- Roland Kaiser as Helge Frank / Pips
- Rudolf Platte as Edgar Stephan
- Werner Finck as Dr. Julius Wayer
- Erwin Linder as Veit Lauffer
- Traute Carlsen as Tante Marie Berner
- Gisela Peltzer as Lucie Krämer
- Peter Franck as Film Producer, Dr. Krämer
- Hans Hermann Schaufuß as Old Man from Heidelberg
- Maria Sebaldt as Grace, American Tourist
- Marianne Hediger as Heidi Lauffer
- Sibylle von Gymnich as Rosi Berner
- Elsbeth Gmür as Maria Berner
- Anny Ondra as herself
- Max Schmeling as himself
- Sonja Ziemann as herself

== Bibliography ==
- Reimer, Robert C.; Reimer, Carol J. (2010). The A to Z of German Cinema. Lanham, MD: Scarecrow Press. ISBN 978-0-8108-7611-8.
