= Molly Picon =

American actress (1898–1992)

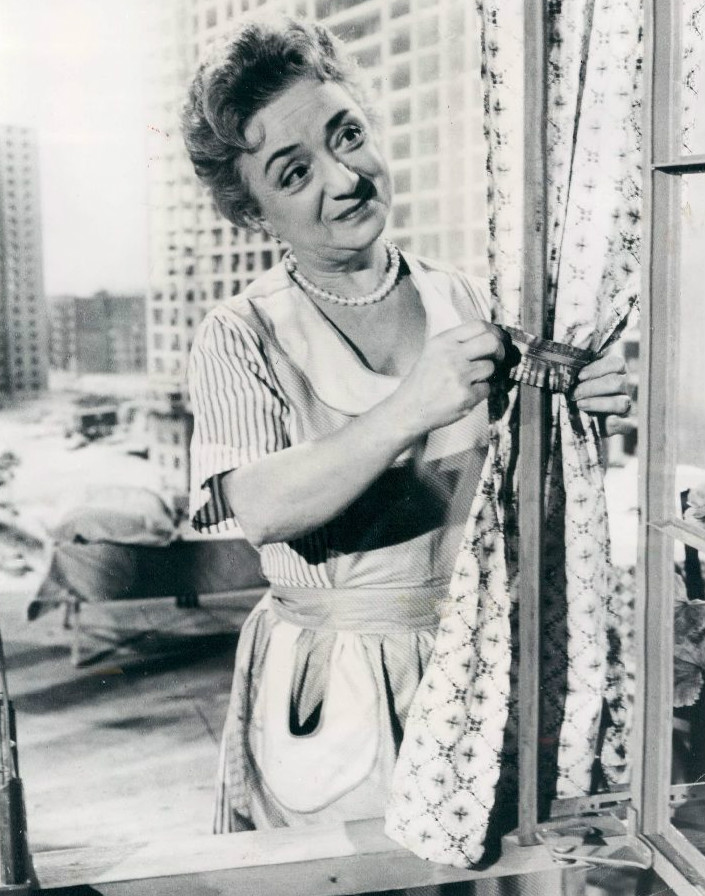
- Picon, as Mrs. Bronson, in Car 54, Where Are You? episode, Occupancy, August 1st (1962)
- Born: Mollie Picon; February 28, 1898; Manhattan, New York, New York
- Died: April 5, 1992 (aged 94); Lancaster, Pennsylvania, US
- Resting place: Mount Hebron Cemetery, New York City
- Occupation: Actress
- Years active: 1904–1984
- Spouse: Jacob Kalich (m. 1919; died 1975)

Molly Picon (Yiddish: מאָלי פּיקאָן; Malka Opiekun; February 28, 1898 – April 5, 1992) was an American actress of stage, screen, radio and television. She was also a lyricist and dramatic storyteller.

She began her career in Yiddish theatre and film, rising to a star, before transitioning into character roles in English-language productions. She is most widely known for her role as Yente the Matchmaker in the 1971 musical film Fiddler on the Roof.

== Early life ==
Picon was born in New York City to Jewish emigrants Louis (Opiekun) Picon and Clara (Ostrovsky) Picon. Her father was from Warsaw and her mother from near Kyiv. The family began living in Philadelphia, Pennsylvania, when she was three years old.

== Career ==
Picon became a star of the Yiddish Theatre District, performing in plays in the District for seven years. Picon was so popular in the 1920s, many shows had her adopted name, Molly, in their title. In 1931, she opened the Molly Picon Theatre.

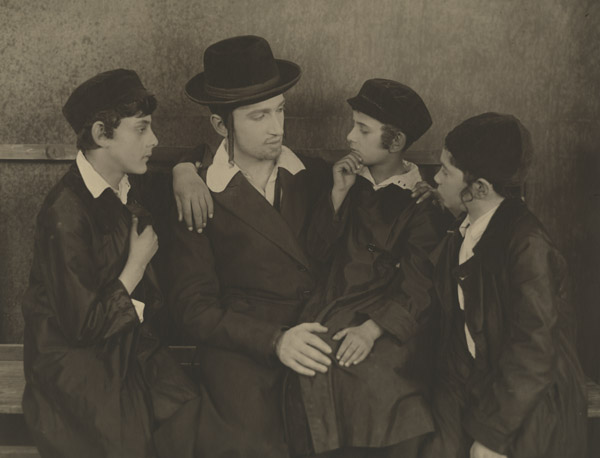
Jacob Kalich (second from left), Picon's husband, in the comedy play Mezrach und Maarev, 1921

Picon in a 1929 Vitaphone Varieties short film

Picon appeared in many films, beginning with silent movies. Her early films were made in Europe; among the first, and earliest to survive, was the Yiddish language East and West, a film adaptation of the 1921 play Mezrach und Maarev produced in Vienna in 1923. The film depicts a clash of New and Old World Jewish cultures. She plays a US-born daughter who travels with her father back to Galicia in East Central Europe.

In 1934, Picon had a musical comedy radio show, The Molly Picon Program, broadcast on WMCA in New York City. In 1938, she starred another radio program on WMCA, I Give You My Life. That program "combined music and dramatic episodes that purported to be the story of her life." Two years later, she starred in Molly Picon's Parade, a variety show on WMCA.

Picon made her English language debut on stage in 1940. On Broadway, she starred in the Jerry Herman musical Milk and Honey in 1961. In 1966, she dropped out of the disastrous Chu Chem during previews in Philadelphia; the show closed before it reached Broadway.

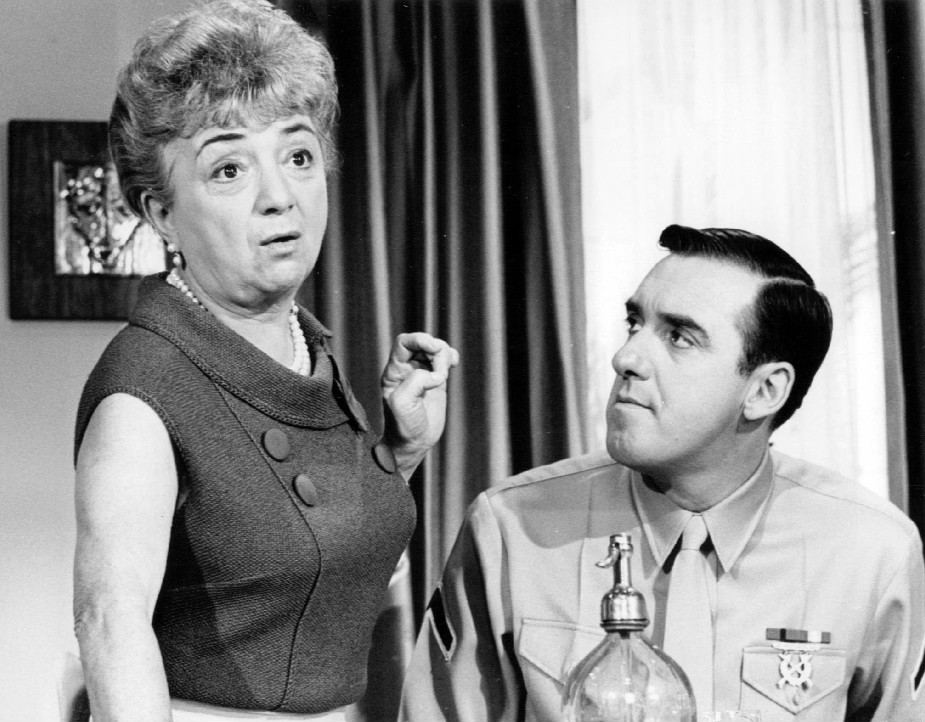
Picon and Jim Nabors in Gomer Pyle USMC (1968)

Picon had a bit part in the 1948 film The Naked City as the woman running a news-stand and soda fountain towards the climax of the film. Her first major Anglophonic role in the movies was in the film version of Come Blow Your Horn (1963), with Frank Sinatra, a role which earned her a nomination for a Golden Globe Award for Best Actress - Comedy or Musical. One of her best-known film roles was as Yente the Matchmaker in the 1971 film adaptation of the Broadway hit Fiddler on the Roof.

Picon appeared as Molly Gordon in an episode of CBS's Gomer Pyle, USMC and had a recurring role as Mrs. Bronson in the NBC police comedy Car 54, Where Are You?. In the comedy For Pete's Sake (1974), she appeared as an elderly madam ("Mrs. Cherry") who arranges a disastrous stint for Barbra Streisand on a job as a call girl. She later had television roles as Mother Mishkin in the third episode of Vega$, a role on the soap opera Somerset and appeared in a few episodes of The Facts of Life as Natalie's grandmother. Picon appeared on the ABC program Young People's Specials in an episode entitled "Grandma Didn't Wave Back". In 1983, Picon's turn on the program would earn her a nomination for a Daytime Emmy Award for Outstanding Performer in Children's Programming. Her final film roles were as Roger Moore's mother, Mrs. Goldfarb, in the screwball comedies Cannonball Run and Cannonball Run II, in 1981 and 1984, respectively.

== Books ==
Picon wrote So Laugh a Little (1962), a biography about her family. In 1980, she published her autobiography, Molly!.

== Personal life ==
Picon was married to actor and playwright Yankel (Jacob) Kalich from 1919 until his death from cancer in 1975. They had a stillborn child, "Baby Girl Kalich", 13 August 1920. Picon succumbed to Alzheimer's Disease on 5 April 1992 in Lancaster, Pennsylvania. She was 94.

== Legacy ==
- An entire room was filled with her memorabilia at the Second Avenue Deli in New York City (whose Second Avenue location is now closed), and is now at 162 E. 33rd St., where the Picon memorabilia adorns the walls.
- The New Century Theatre, a former legitimate Broadway theatre at 932 Seventh Avenue and West 58th Street in Midtown Manhattan (since closed and demolished), was briefly known as the Molly Picon Theatre in 1943.
- She was inducted into the American Theatre Hall of Fame in 1981.
- Picon Pie, a biographical play, ran off-Broadway from 2004 to 2005.
- In 2007, she was featured in the film Making Trouble, a tribute to female Jewish comedians, produced by the Jewish Women's Archive.
- Costumes she wore in various theater productions are displayed at the National Museum of American Jewish History in Philadelphia.

== Filmography ==
Year	Title	Role	Notes
1922	Look After Your Daughters		
1923	East and West	Mollie	
1936	Yiddle with His Fiddle	Itke aka Judel	
1937	Let's Make a Night of It	Specialty Act	Uncredited
1938	Mamele	Khavtshi Samet aka Mamele	
1948	The Naked City	Soda-Selling Shopkeeper	Uncredited
1959	Startime	Sarah Rabinowitz	Episode: "The Jazz Singer", a TV production starring Jerry Lewis
1961-1963	Car 54, Where Are You?	Mrs. Rachel Bronson	3 episodes
1968	Gomer Pyle, U.S.M.C.	Molly Gordon	1 episode
1963	Come Blow Your Horn	Mrs. Sophie Baker	
1971	Fiddler on the Roof	Yente	
1974	For Pete's Sake	Mrs. Cherry	
1975	Murder on Flight 502	Ida Goldman	
1979	That's Life		
1981	The Cannonball Run	Mom Goldfarb	
1984	Cannonball Run II	Mom Goldfarb	

== Sources ==
- Eth Clifford. Molly Picon – So Laugh a Little, Messner, 1962 (see ).
- Lila Perl, Donna Ruff. Molly Picon: A Gift of Laughter, Jewish Publication Society, 1990, ISBN 0-8276-0336-3.
