= List of Czech films before 1920 =

A List of Czech films, the earliest silent films before 1920.

== 1898–1919 ==
Title	Director	Cast	Genre	Notes
1898
Dostaveníčko ve mlýnici	Jan Kříženecký	Josef Malostranský		
Smích a pláč	Jan Kříženecký			
Výstavní párkař a lepič plakátů	Jan Kříženecký			
1907
Nejlepší číslo	Jan Kříženecký			
1910
Jarní sen starého mládence	Jan Kříženecký	Ferry Seidl; Berta Friedrichová; Otto Zahrádka, Bohumil Kovář; Marie Demartiniová		
1911
Hubička; Ponrepovo kouzelnictví Rudi na křtinách Rudi na záletech Rudi se žení Rudi sportsman Sokové	Antonín Pech	Emil Artur Longen		
1912
Pro peníze Svatojanské proudy Dáma s barzojem Záhadný zločin Falešný hráč	Antonín Pech			
1913
Zub za zub Pět smyslů člověka Americký souboj Estrella; Cholera v Praze; Idyla ze staré Prahy; Pan profesor, nepřítel žen Podkova; Prodoná nevěsta Rozvedená paní Šaty dělají člověka Šoférka; Tragédie ve sněhu Zkažená krev	Antonín Pech; J. Malostranský; Otakar Štáfl; Max Urban; Alois Jalovec; Max Urban; Jiří Steimar; Max Urban; Max Urban; Max Urban; Max Urban; Rudolf Kafka; Max Urban; Alois Wiesner			
1914
Andula žárlí Nenávistí k lásce Noční děs Zamilovaná tchyně	Otakar Štáfl Jan A. Palouš; Antonín Pech			
1919
Akord smrti	Jan S. Kolár			
Boby nesmí kouřit	Přemysl Pražský			
Divoká Maryna	Divoká Maryna			
Dáma s malou nožkou	Jan S. Kolár			
Láska je utrpením	Přemysl Pražský & Vladimír Slavínský			
Palimpsest	Joe Jenčík			
Sneženka z Tater	Olaf Larus-Racek			
Teddy by kouřil	Gustav Machatý			
Will o' the Wisp	Thea Červenicová			
