= Czech architecture =

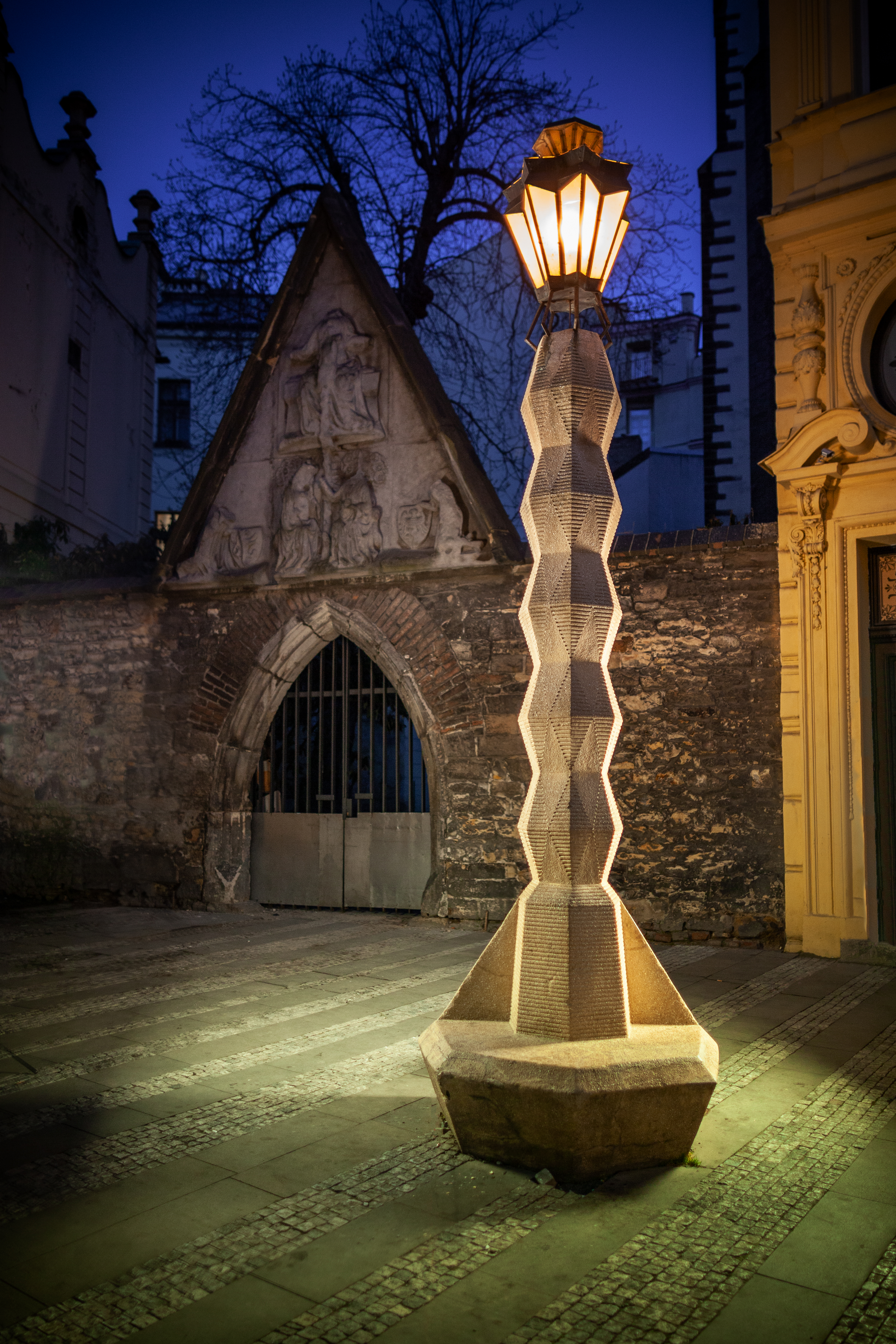
Cubist lamp by Emil Králíček, Jungmannovo náměstí, next to the Gothic Church of Our Lady of the Snows (Prague)

Czech architecture, or more precisely architecture of the Czech Republic or architecture of Czechia, is a term covering many important historical and contemporary architectural movements in Bohemia, Moravia, and Silesia. From its early beginnings to the present day, almost all historical styles are represented, including many monuments from various historical periods. Some of them are UNESCO World Heritage Sites.

== Neoclassicism ==
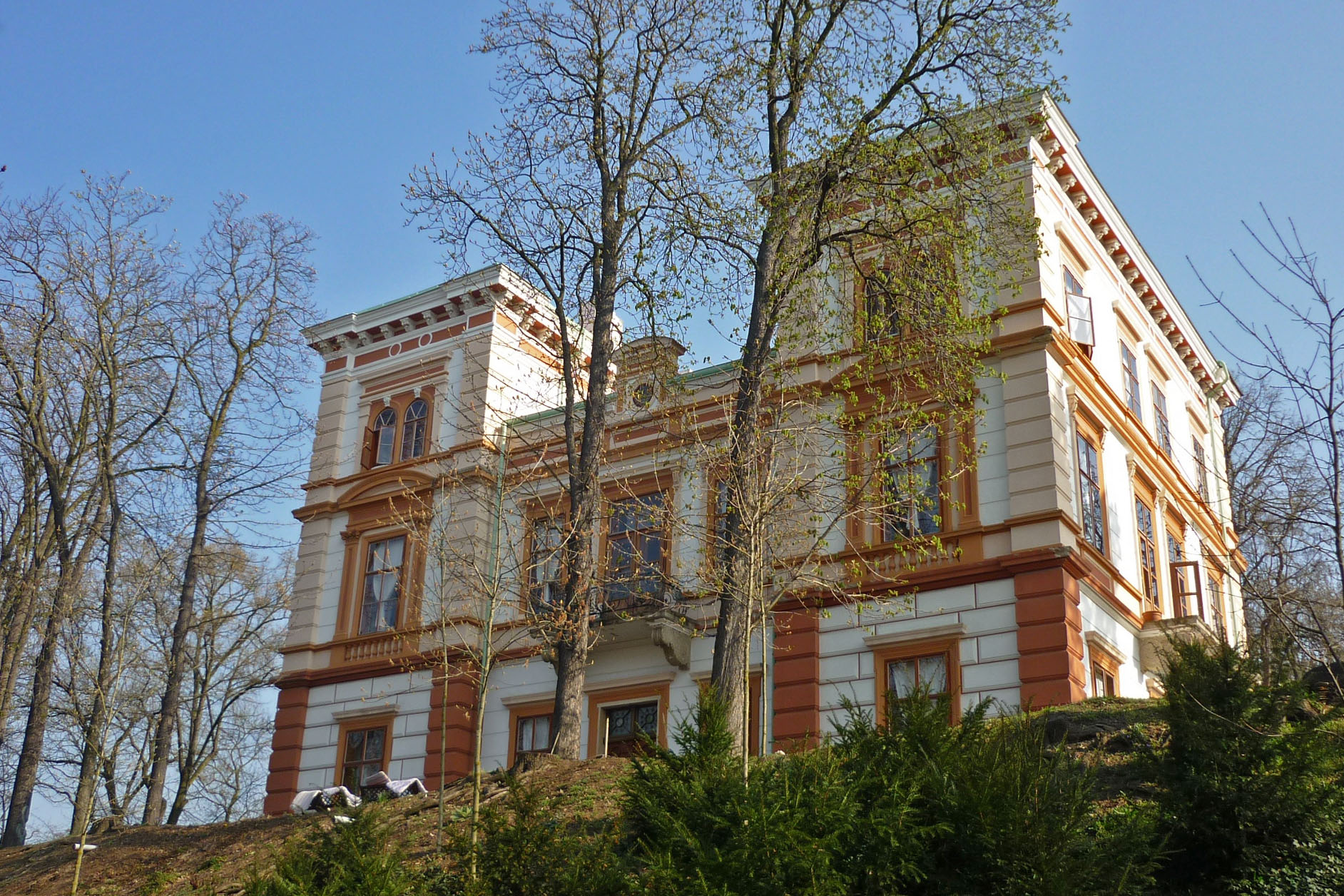
Korozluky Castle

Although late Baroque in the Czech lands is mainly associated with the reign of Maria Theresa (1740–1780), after her death, this style was more and more often replaced by Neoclassical architecture, and ultimately by Empire style. The transition from Baroque to Neolassicism is announced by the reconstruction of Prague Castle by the Viennese architect Nicolo Pacassi. He and Kilián Ignác Dientzenhofer were followed by Ignác Jan Nepomuk Palliardi, in whom the already high Baroque tradition is combined with Classicist decor. Antonín Haffenecker, another architect who went from Baroque to Classicism (Estates Theatre), is associated with Pacassi and Johann Bernhard Fischer.

In the entire Austrian Empire, i.e. in the Czech lands, there were no suitable conditions for the equally successful development of classical architecture as in France or Russia. In the Czech Republic, it is difficult to find a building from the early Classicist period. The reason for the slow development was the ideals of the Enlightenment, which were more restrictive of the old than the new.

During Maria Theresa's reign, compulsory schooling was introduced, which clearly contributed to the education of the empire's population. Her son, Emperor Joseph II, initiated the so-called Josephine reforms, during which hundreds of churches and monasteries were abolished throughout the Empire, entire orders were dissolved, and the abandoned buildings were transformed into offices, public hospitals or barracks. In Austria the bourgeoisie developed slowly, which was not strong enough to push through the changes and put an end to feudalism because it feared the atrocities that took place in revolutionary France. That's why classicism in the Czech lands was lagging behind and manifested itself sporadically in less important buildings. The evolution of Classicism from the Baroque period is quite evident, as figurative ornaments are gradually being abandoned and the richness of the ornamentation gives way to late Classicism buildings, which have been transformed into strict empire-building lines.

Examples might include Duchcov Chateau, Karlova Koruna Chateau, Kynžvart Castle.

== Empire style ==
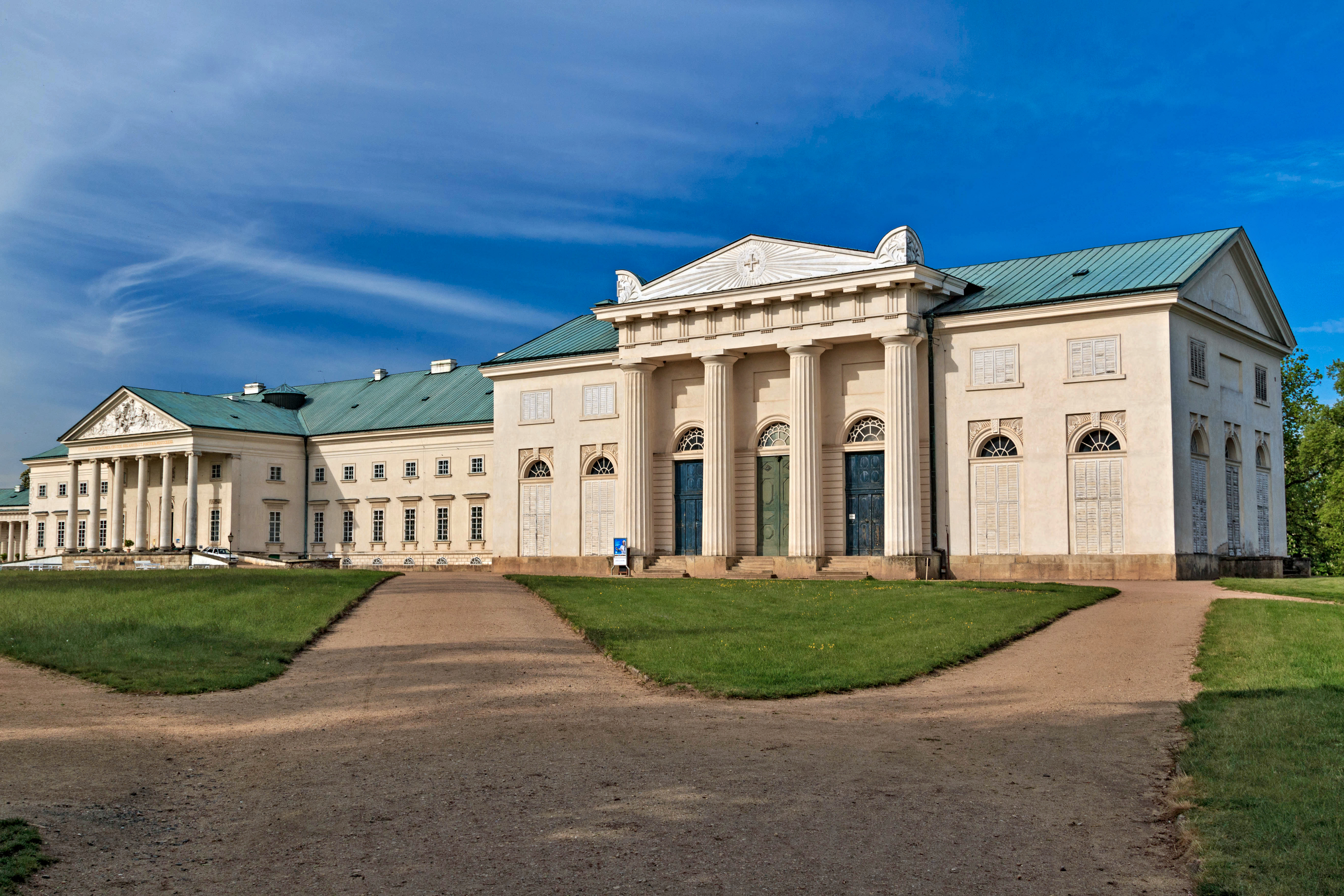
Kačina Castle in Chotkov

The period of imperial style is mainly associated with the First French Empire under Napoleon I. Typical for Empire buildings are clean, regular shapes with minimal decoration, lines are straight to raw. The main feature of Empire architecture is a frequent use of characteristic columns and triangular facades of larger buildings.

The most important building in the Empire style is Kačina Chotkov Castle, but also interesting are Fryštát (Lottyhaus) castle in Karviná, Boskovice, Pohansko (Lednice–Valtice Cultural Landscape) and Kostelec nad Orlicí Castle. An interesting example of the transition from classicism to the Empire style is the new chateau in Dačice.

== Modern period ==
=== Art Nouveau ===
The wave of Art Nouveau at the turn of the 19th and 20th centuries was significant in Czech architecture. Typical are Art Nouveau buildings, especially as private villas, hotels or public buildings (town hall, schools, crematoria), as well as several churches or castle buildings.

Municipal House

The most important Czech architects of this period are Antonín Balšánek, Osvald Polívka, Josef Fanta, Jan Letzel, Alfons Mucha.

Important monuments include Municipal House, Vršovice Savings Bank Building, Praha hlavní nádraží railway station, Brno hlavní nádraží railway station, Villa Bílek, Šaloun Villa, Hotel Paris (Prague), Vinohrady Theatre, J. K. Tyl Theatre, City of Prague Museum.

=== Cubism ===
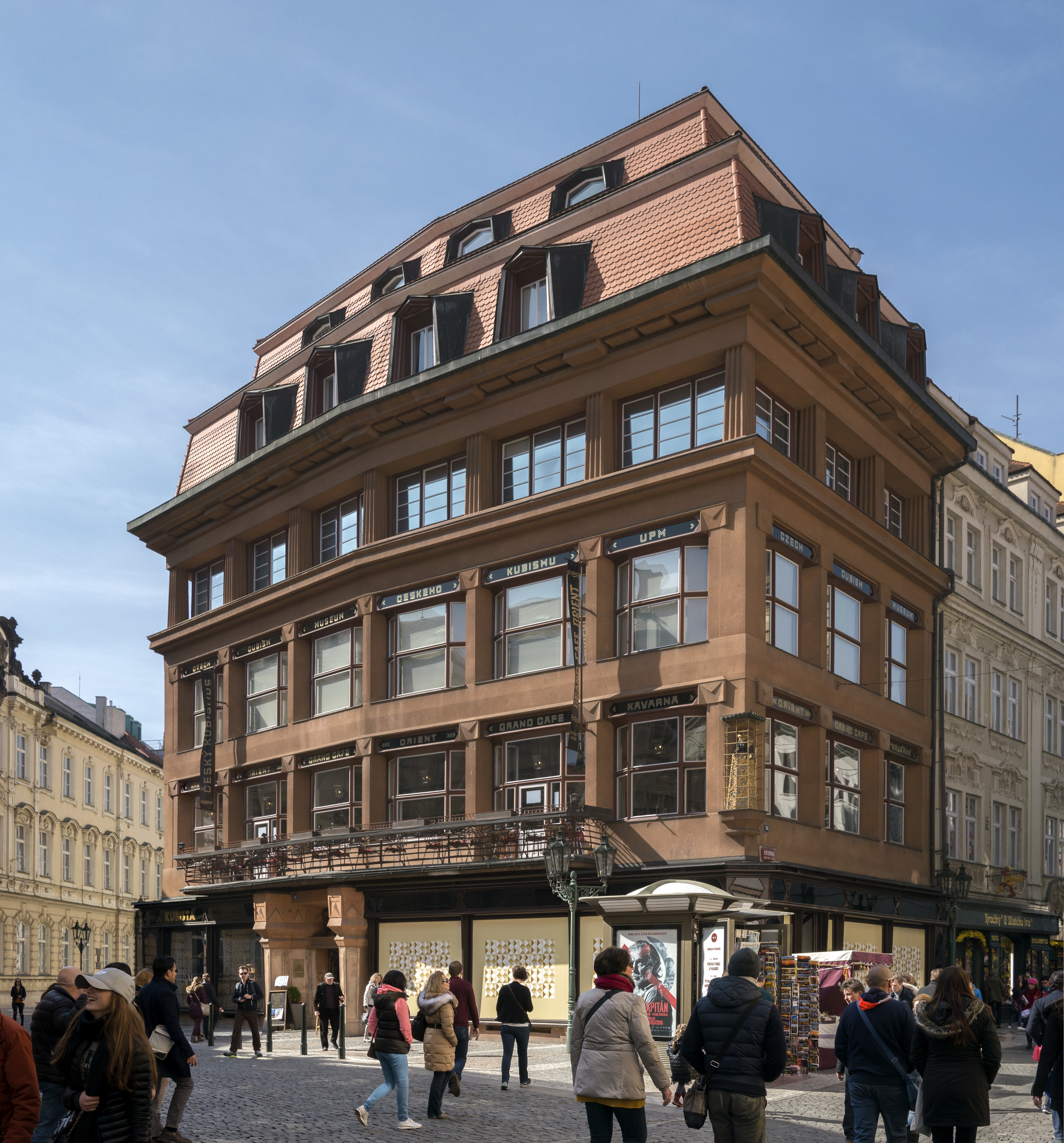
House of the Black Madonna

Cubism appeared at the beginning of the 20th century as an avant-garde artistic movement based on completely new ideas. The term "Cubism" was first used by the French art critic Louis Vauxcelles in 1908.

The principle of Cubism is based on the spatial concept of a work of art, in which it captures objects not only from one angle but from several angles at once. The presented object has been distributed into basic geometric shapes (mainly cubes). Therefore, Cubism had to solve new problems of perspective and create new spatial relations between the objects. Three-dimensional objects created many views with unusual angles.

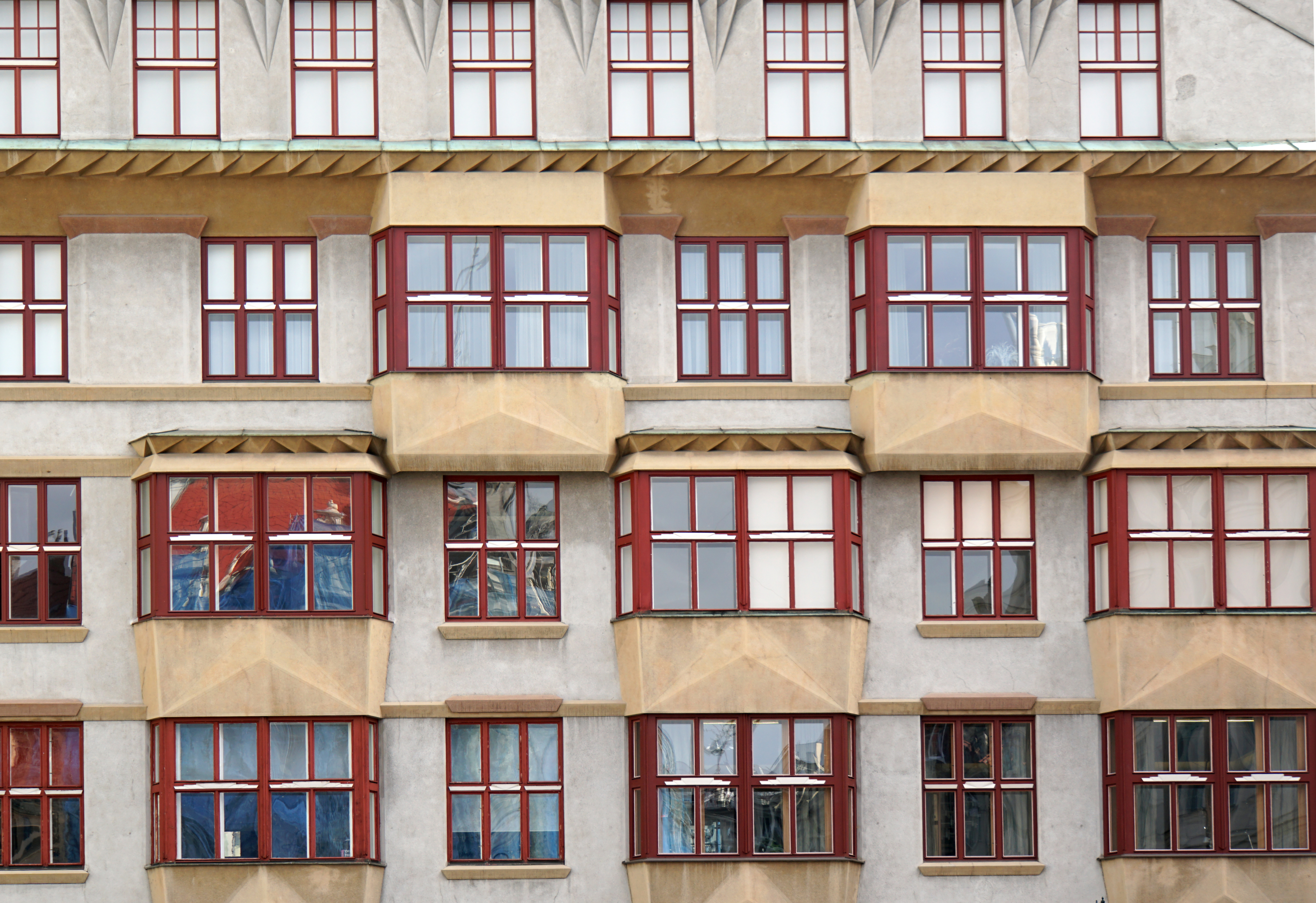
Cubist architecture in Prague

Cubism directly or indirectly influenced the development of new artistic styles (futurism, constructivism, and expressionism). However, unlike other movements, Cubism had no expression in literature. It manifested itself mainly in painting, sculpture, and partly also in the architecture of the former Czechoslovakia, where it became an independent artistic style.

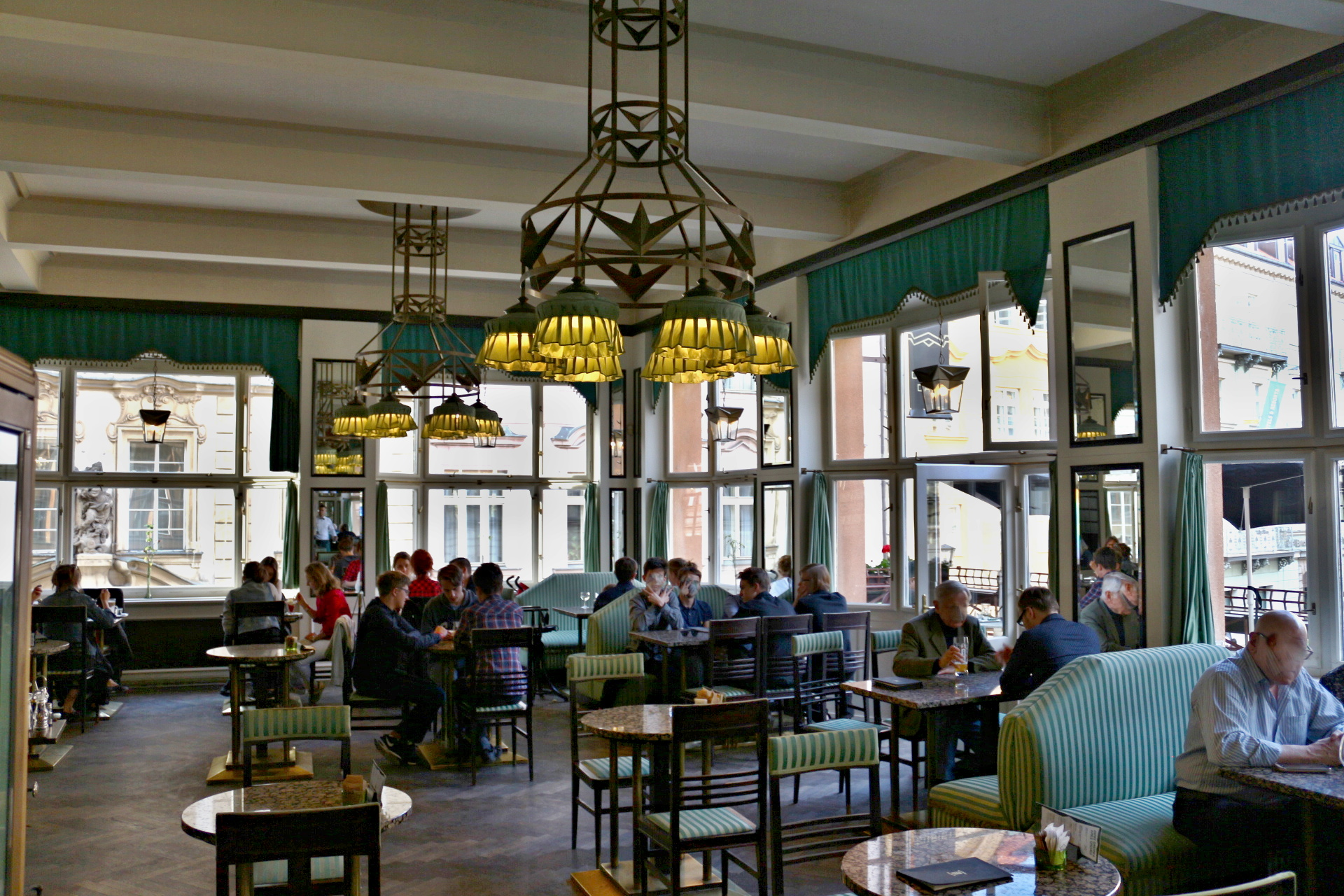
Grand Café Orient in Prague

Cubism manifested itself primarily in the fine arts (Picasso, Braque, Cézanne), which strongly influenced some architects, but one cannot speak of pure cubism, because of course, they had to be primarily functional. The architects working under the influence of Cubism created characteristic objects that seem a bit strange. Cubist architecture in Czechoslovakia has been operating since around 1911. In the 1920s, it developed in Prague. Its most prominent representatives gathered in the Manes Fine Arts Association. They include painters Emil Filla, Antonín Procházka and Josef Čapek, sculptor Otto Gutfreund, architects Josef Gočár, Josef Chochol, Pavel Janák, and others.

The Cubist style is unique in the world and nowhere else has Cubist architecture reached such a boom as in the Czech Republic.

Architects:

- Josef Gočár
- Josef Chochol
- Pavel Janák
- Otakar Novotný
- Vlastislav Hofman

=== Rondocubism ===
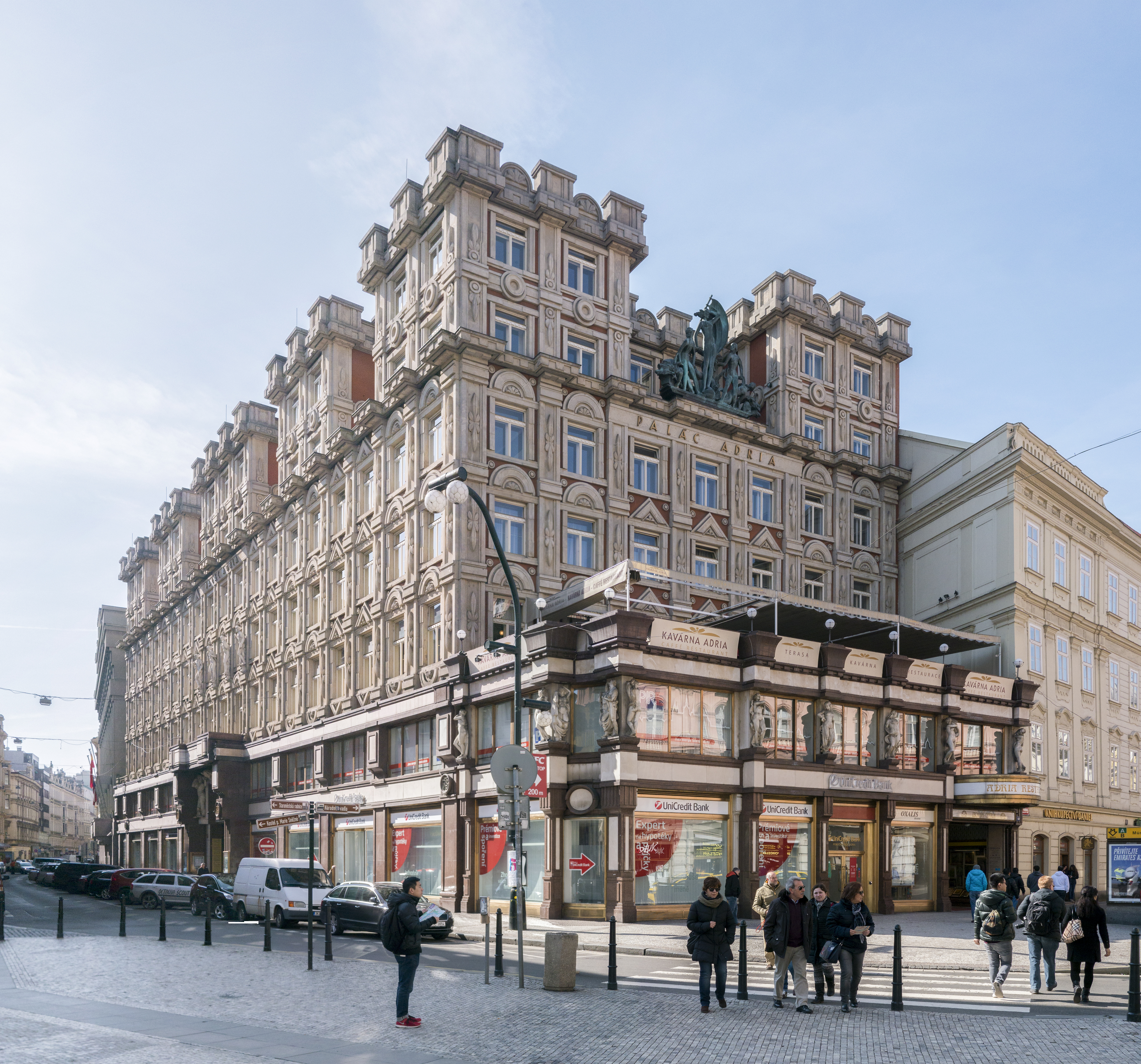
Adria Palace (Prague)

Rondocubism is an independent local formula of Czech architecture. It developed as an independent branch of the Cubist style after World War I in the newly established Czechoslovakia, where it became the national style for a short time.

Rondocubism, as the name suggests, is characterized by the use of round shapes such as arches, circles, and ovals, which are based on Cubist foundations. These were to commemorate national Slavic traditions. Rondocubism was most evident in Prague, but also in other places, especially in the form of industrial architecture. The highest buildings in the world of Rondocubism are considered to be Legiobanka by Josef Gočár and Adria Palace by Pavel Janák in Prague.

Rondo-Cubism has also manifested itself in art, for example in the paintings of Josef Čapek and Objectdesign. Furniture created by Bohumil Waigant and Josef Gočár is still preserved.

Rondocubism in architecture tried to contain characteristic Slavic elements. The use of national colors: red and white should also help. The shapes of rondocubist buildings are usually massive, cylindrical, round, similar to annual wooden rings.

The seat of the Legiobanka in Na Poříčí Street is a rondocubist monument from 1921-1923. Its facade was decorated by Otto Gutfreund and Jan Štursa. The stained-glass windows in the hall and decorative bricks are the work of František Kysel.

The Adria Palace, built in 1925 by Pavel Janák and German architect Josef Zasch from Prague, on Jungmann Square for the Italian insurance company Riunione Adriatica di Sicurtà. The sculptural decoration is the work of Jan Štursa and Karl Dvořák. In 1926, during a conference in Prague, when the French architect Le Corbusier saw the Adria Palace, he called it "a massive structure with an Assyrian appearance".

The Rondocubist furniture in the house on Kamenická Street in Holešovice is the work of Otakar Novotny.

=== Functionalism ===
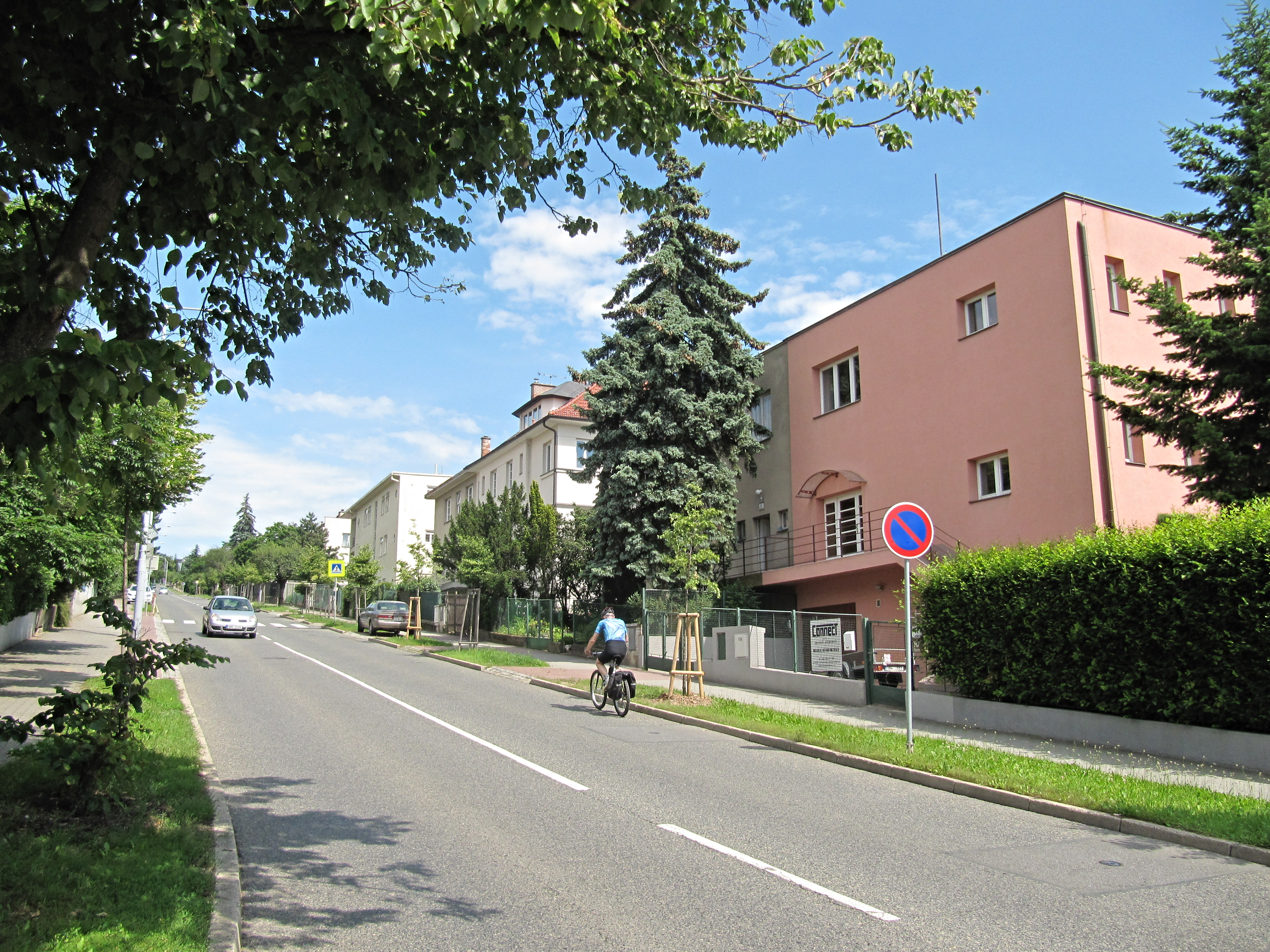
Semi-detached villa in Brno by Otto Eisler, according to MoMA's Henry-Russell Hitchcock and Philip Johnson, is a defining building of the International style.

Functionalist Villa Tugendhat is one of the most famous examples of Czech architecture of the 20th century and is a UNESCO World Heritage Site.

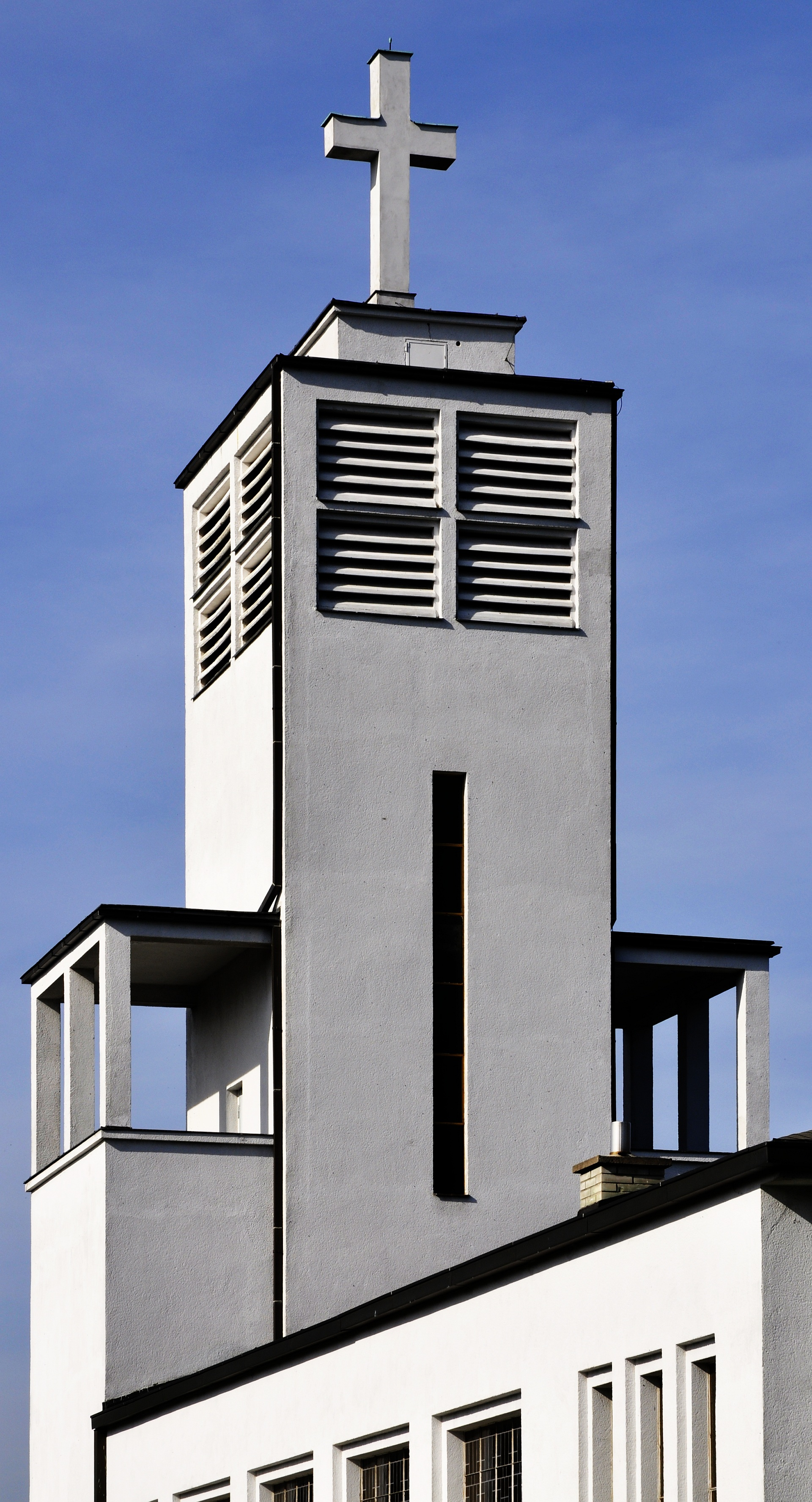
Church of Saint Agnes of Bohemia (Spořilov)

Since the 1920s, architecture has been striving for functionalism, an architectural style that primarily applies the criteria of functionality, usability and practical purpose. This direction is guided by the motto "form follows function", which in practice manifests itself in simple, sometimes even austere lines.

The main representatives of this direction in the Czech lands were architects Jan Kotěra and Josef Gočár, as well as the prominent Slovenian architect Jože Plečnik. He was the author of the Church of the Sacred Heart of Jesus in Prague. Another important foreign architect working in Czechoslovakia was Ludwig Mies van der Rohe, author of Villa Tugendhat.

Important monuments include: National Gallery Prague, Baťa's Skyscraper, Tomas Bata Memorial, Barrandov Terraces, Hus Congregational House, Agudas Achim Synagogue (Brno), Smíchov Synagogue.

== Late and postmodernism ==
=== Socialist realism ===
In the 1950s socialist realism (also called sorela) was required as an official style. Characteristic buildings in its spirit are the Jalta Hotel on Wenceslas Square or the Poruba housing estate in Ostrava. A specific branch of Sorela was the so-called Stalinist neoclassicism, which represents Hotel International in Prague's Dejvice.

=== Brussels style ===
However, in the late 1950s, the new style, known as "Brussels", became popular in architecture (and of course in design), as it was presented at Expo 58 in Brussels. It was characterized by round shapes and glass facades. A typical building in the Brussels style was the Czech Expo pavilion (no longer existing) and the building of the Czech restaurant (currently in Letná Park, Prague). Other important buildings in the Brussels style are the Z pavilion in the exhibition center in Brno, the swimming pool in Podolí and the railway station in Havířov.

=== Czech brutalism ===
In the late 1960s, the Czech version of brutalism replaced the Brussels style. The projects of Věra Machoninová and her husband Vladimír Machonín (residential community center in Prague, Hotel Thermal in Karlovy Vary, Kotva in Prague, the Czechoslovak embassy in Berlin) are particularly appreciated.

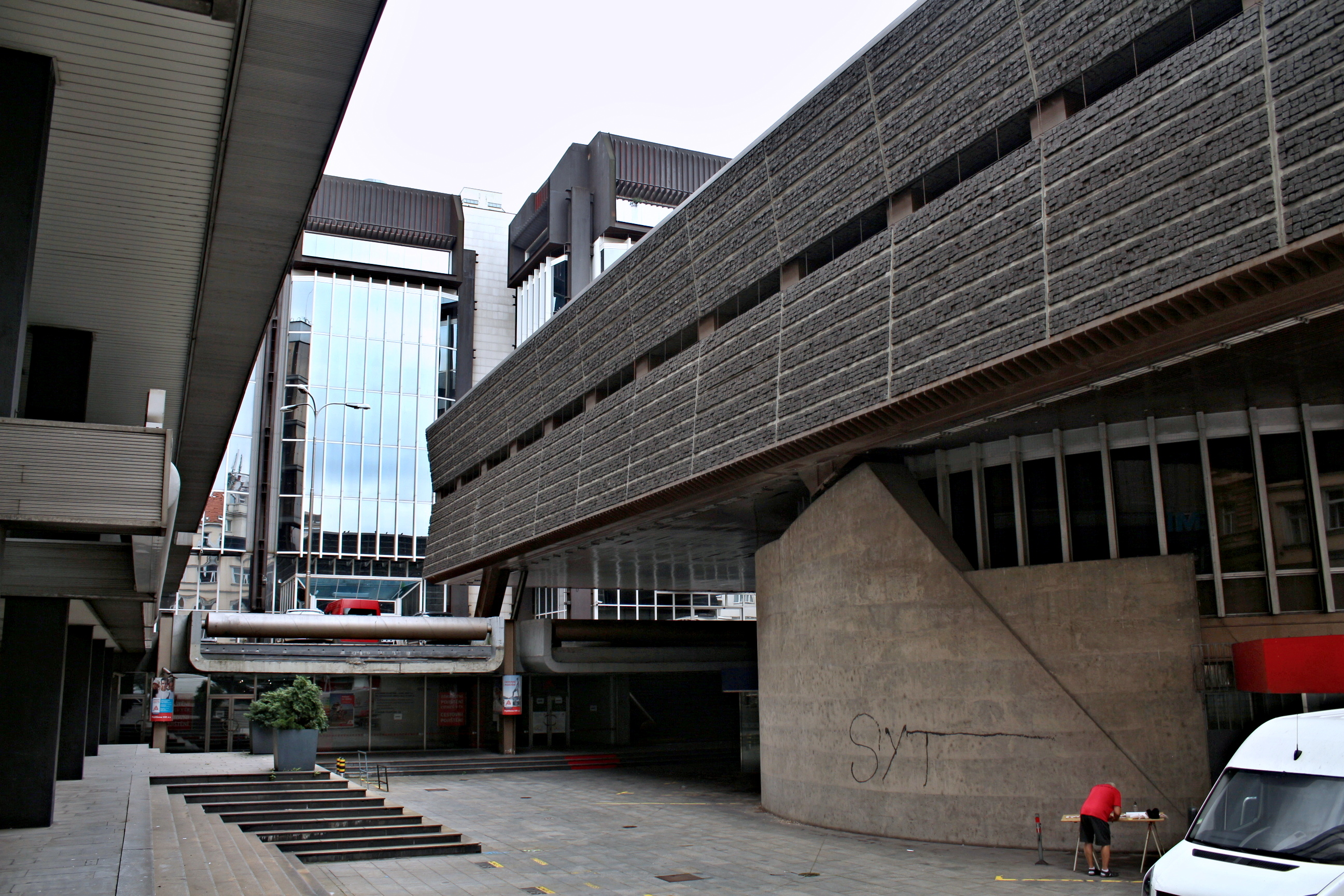
Iconic brutalist Transgas building, demolished in 2019

Other buildings include the Czechoslovak embassy in London (architects Jan Bočan, Jan Šrámek and Karel Štěpánský), the Intercontinental Hotel (Karel Bubeníček and Karel Filsak), Karel Prager buildings (former Federal Assembly building, New Stage of the National Theatre). However, the most valued building of that time was a transmitter and hotel on Ještěd, by Karel Hubáček.

=== Postmodern architecture ===
The Dancing House of Frank Gehry and Vlado Miluň in Prague, which was initiated directly by Václav Havel, is often referred to as a symbol of post-modern architecture. Jean Nouvel (Golden Angel in Prague's Smichov) or Ricardo Bofill were among the most important architects in Prague at that time.

Others include the project of transforming the surroundings of the Masaryk station, which was prepared by the Pritzker Prize winner Zaha Hadid. Among other projects, the National Technical Library in Prague's Dejvice district received the greatest recognition. The widely-discussed design of the new, modern building of the National Library by Neo-Futurist architect Jan Kaplický, remained only on paper. Among the successful contemporary Czech architects is Eva Jiřičná, who designed, for example, the Orangery at Prague Castle, Zlín Congress Centre and other buildings abroad.

== Literature and sources ==
- ČERNÁ, Marie. Dějiny výtvarného umění. Praha: IDEA SERVIS, 2012. ISBN 978-80-85970-74-6. S. 91-93.
- ŠAMÁNKOVÁ, Eva. Architektura české renesance. Praha: Státní nakladatelství krásné literatury a umění, 1961.
- Dějiny českého výtvarného umění II/1. Academia, Praha 1989. ISBN 80-200-0069-0
