= Prior (department store chain) =

Czechoslovak chain of department stores

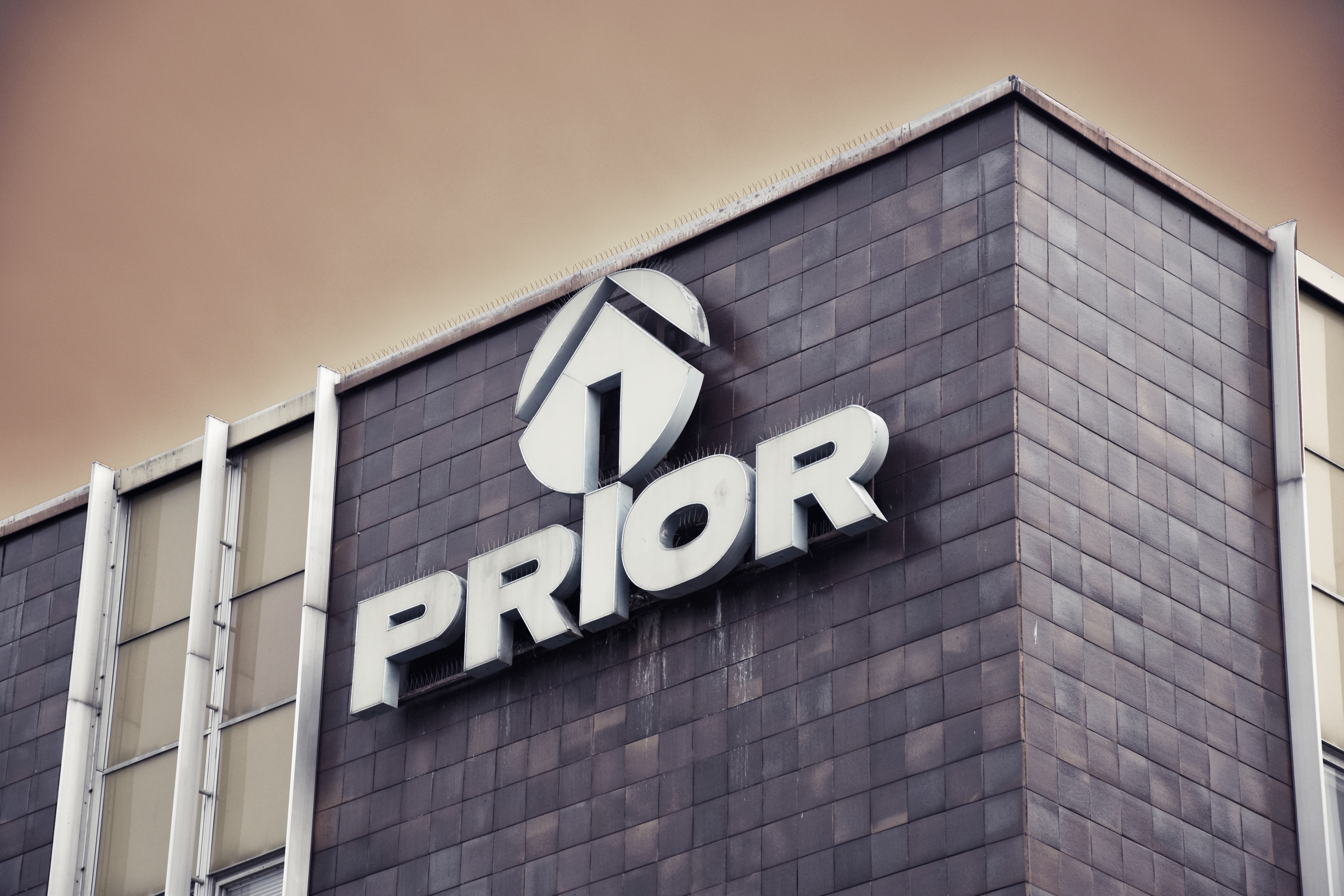
Logo from pre-1989 on the building of the never-opened Praha-Modřany store

Prior (Czech pronunciation: [prɪjɔ̯r] or occasionally Czech pronunciation: [prɪɔr]) was a chain of department stores that operated in Czechoslovakia during the Communist era. The chain was established as a cooperative organization of state-operated department stores and operated in both the Czech and Slovak parts of the country.

== History ==
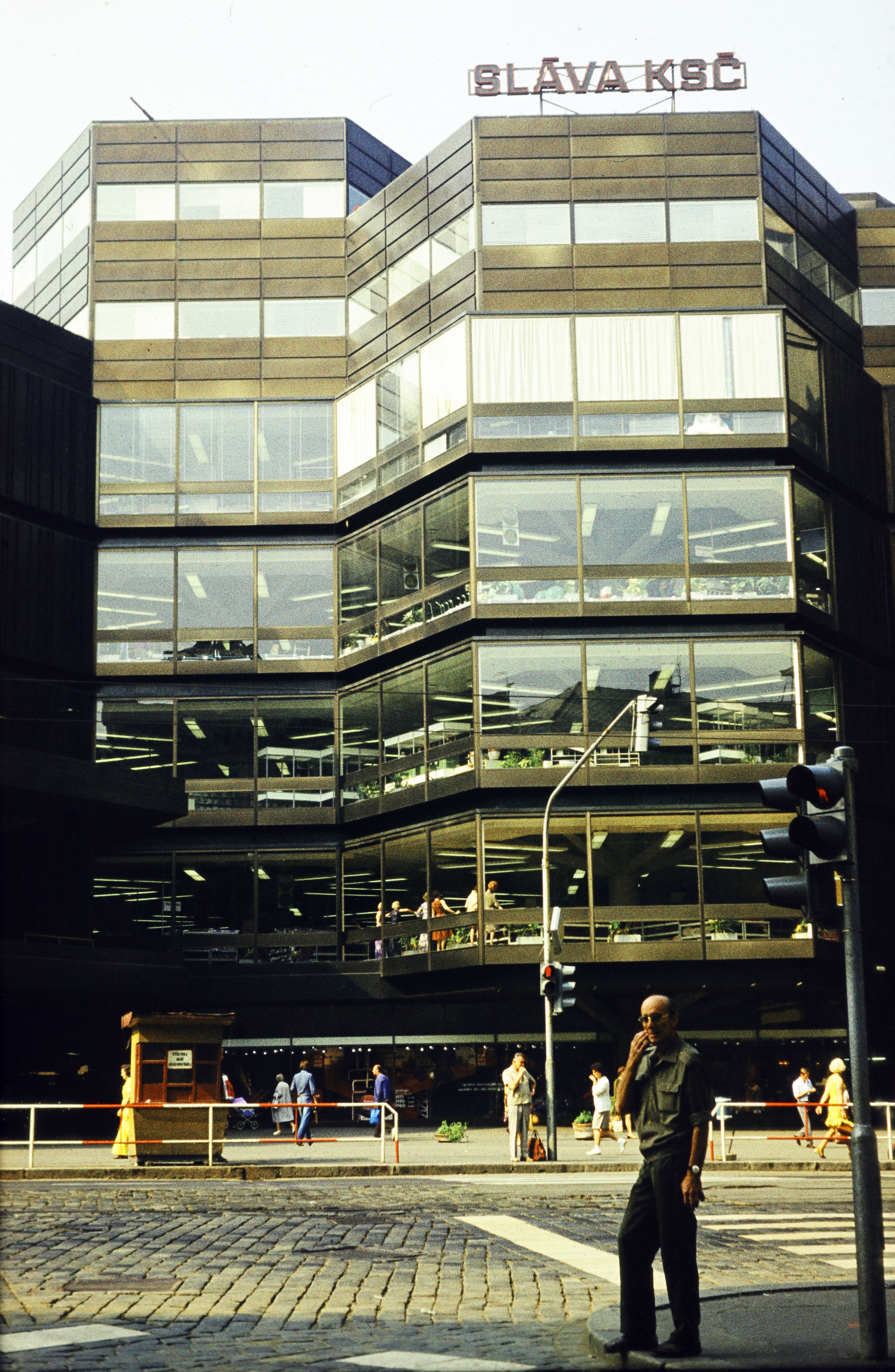
Kotva department store on Republic Square in Prague, part of the Prior chain, 1974

The first department store to bear the Prior name opened on 20 November 1968 in Bratislava, Slovakia. The chain subsequently incorporated several department stores that had existed before the Communist takeover of Czechoslovakia, including Bílá labuť in Prague. Most Prior department stores, however, were newly constructed. Notable examples included the Kotva and Máj department stores in Prague. Prior department stores were generally located in large and medium-sized cities throughout Czechoslovakia.

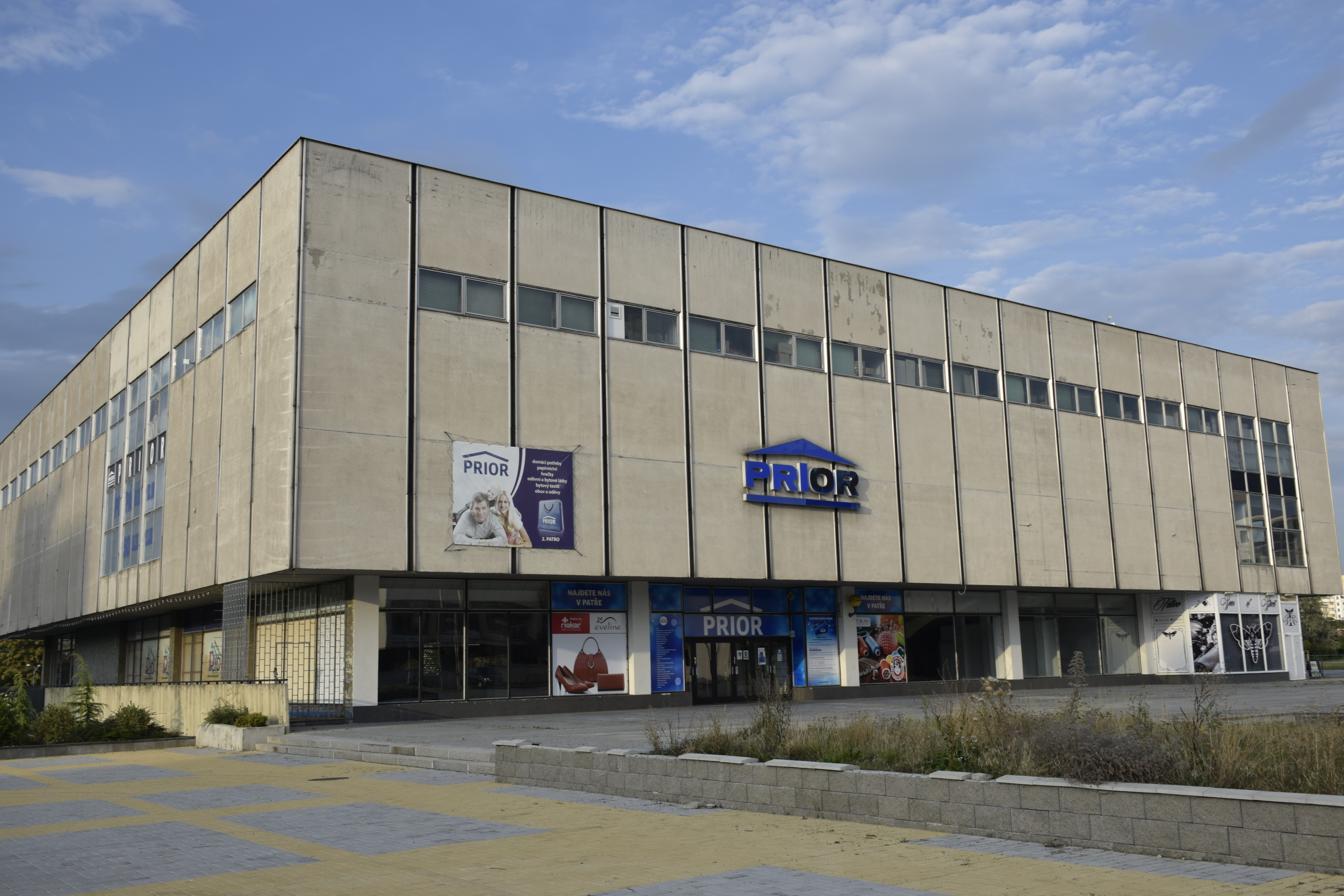
Prior in Most, 2021

The Prior chain had a unified visual identity, including standardized graphic elements and logos. Its advertising included television commercials (Note: Several period TV-spots have been uploaded on the Internet, an example of which is this YouTube video showing two of them.) and promotional posters. The development of a unified corporate identity was relatively unusual in the Czechoslovak retail sector at the time due to regime context.

Following the Velvet Revolution in 1989 and the subsequent transition to a market economy, the department stores in the Prior network were gradually privatized and transferred to different owners and operators. Some stores were closed or converted to other uses, while others continued operating under the Prior name, adopted new names, or became part of other new retail chains.

Several former Prior department stores were acquired in 1992 by the Czechoslovak branch of the American retail chain Kmart. These stores were later sold to the British retailer Tesco. Other former Prior department stores underwent various changes in ownership and use.

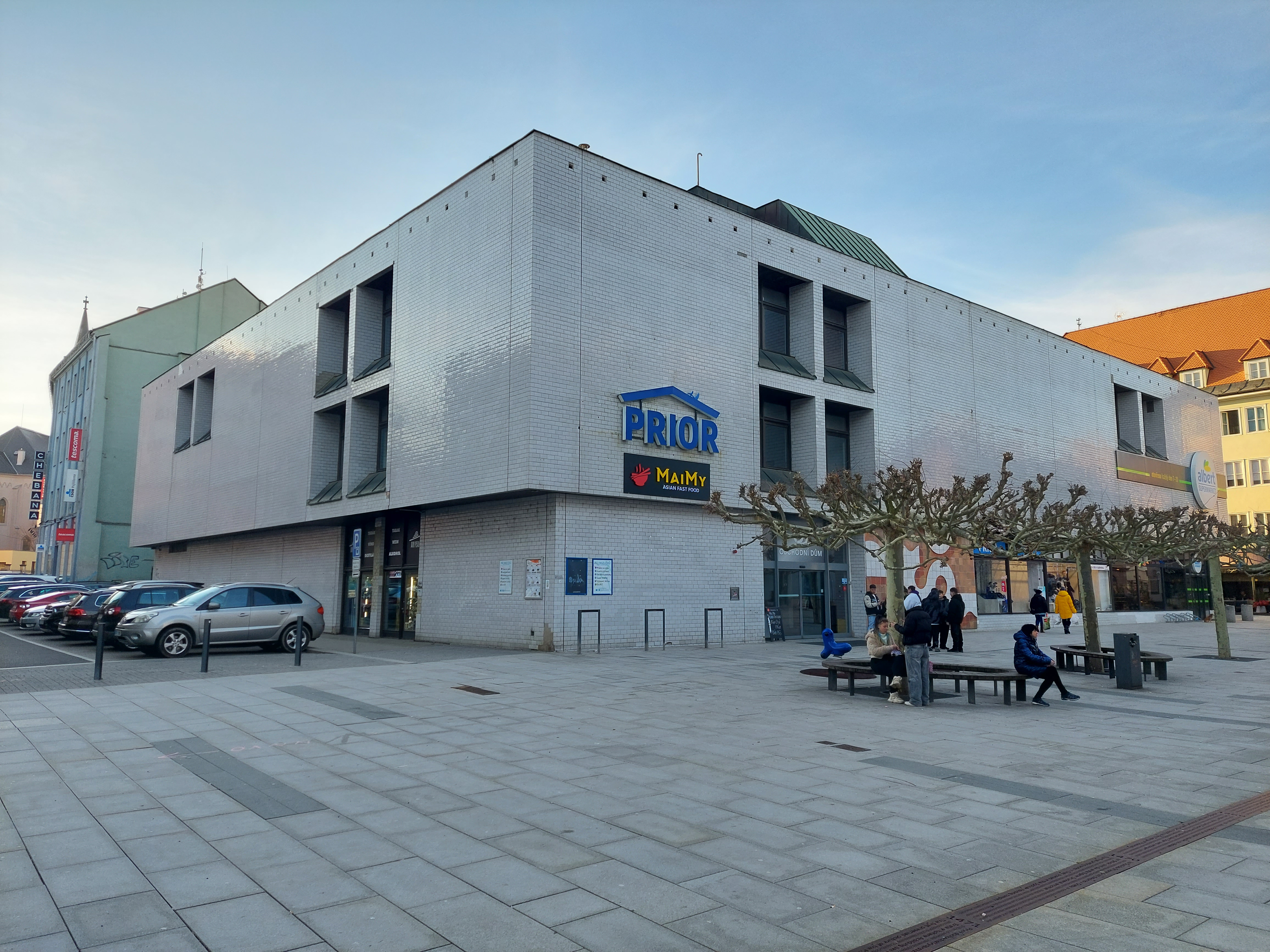
Prior in Cheb, 2025

The Prior name continues to be used by several independent retail businesses and commercial properties in the Czech Republic and Slovakia, although these do not constitute a continuation of the original nationwide department-store network.

In the Czech Republic, a retail chain operating under the Prior name had 12 department stores as of August 2026. Unlike the former Prior department stores, which offered a broad range of consumer goods, the chain's current assortment is primarily focused on haberdashery and textile goods, household equipment, and stationery. Its stores include locations like Cheb or České Budějovice. The chain also operated a mall in Most until its closure following the acquisition of the property by the city in 2024.

In Slovakia, the Prior name is used by a network of eight shopping centres. These properties primarily serve as commercial premises leased to various independent retailers and other businesses that are not affiliated with the Prior retail chain. Several department stores in Slovakia also continue to use the name Prior without belonging to a unified retail chain.

In some cities and towns, the name Prior is also used by local people as a designation for commercial buildings that formerly housed Prior department stores, even though the original chain no longer operates there.
