= Max Urban =

Max Urban may refer to:

- Max Urban (architect) (1882–1959), Czech architect and filmmaker
- Max Urban (composer) (1882–1949), German-born Mexican composer
