= Konec milování =

- Directed by: Otakar Stáfl; Max Urban
- Written by: Max Urban; Anna Sedlácková
- Starring: Anna Sedlácková
- Cinematography: Max Urban
- Release date: 1913
- Country: Austria-Hungary
- Languages: Silent; Czech intertitles

Konec milování is a 1913 Austro-Hungarian drama film directed by Otakar Stáfl and Max Urban.

== Cast ==
- Anna Sedlácková as Irena
- Milos Vávra as Fred
- Jarmila Kronbauerová as Lolotta
- Alois Sedlácek as Family Friend
- Otakar Stáfl as Notary
- Ema Kronbauerová as Irena's Friend
- Ruzena Havelská as Older Irena's Friend
- Václav Nykysa as Chauffeur
