= Podkova =

Podkova (Slavic Подкова 'horseshoe') may refer to:

- Podkova, a former genus of wasps currently treated as a junior synonym of Horismenus
- Podkova (film), a 1913 Austro-Hungarian comedy film
- Podkova (village), a village in Kirkovo Municipality, Kardzhali Province, Bulgaria
- Lake Podkova in northern Greece, also written Butkova, Butkovo, Batkova, Batkovo
- The Podkova, a device that is the MacGuffin in Mission: Impossible – The Final Reckoning
