= Pět smyslů člověka =

Pět smyslů člověka (The five human senses, or Prefantýn and his love)
- Directed by: Josef Svab-Lesser
- Starring: Josef Svab-Lesser (Prefatýn), Katy Kaclová - Vališová (the cook), Mary Klimešová (love)
- Cinematography: Antonin Pech
- Production company: Kinofa
- Release date: 1913
- Country: Austria-Hungary

Pět smyslů člověka is a 1913 Austro-Hungarian comedy film. It was filmed in Prague and is one of the few Czech films of its era to have survived.
