= Rudi na záletech =

- Directed by: Emil Artur Longen, Antonín Pech
- Written by: Emil Artur Longen, Antonín Pech
- Starring: Emil Artur Longen, Josef Waltner
- Production company: Kinofa
- Release date: 1911
- Country: Austria-Hungary

Rudi na záletech is a 1911 Austro-Hungarian comedy film. It's one of a series of four films written by and starring Emil Artur Longen as the title character, Rudi. It was filmed in Prague.

The short comedy is about a sailor called Rudi, who gets chased around the beach.
