= Xena Longenová =

Czech actress

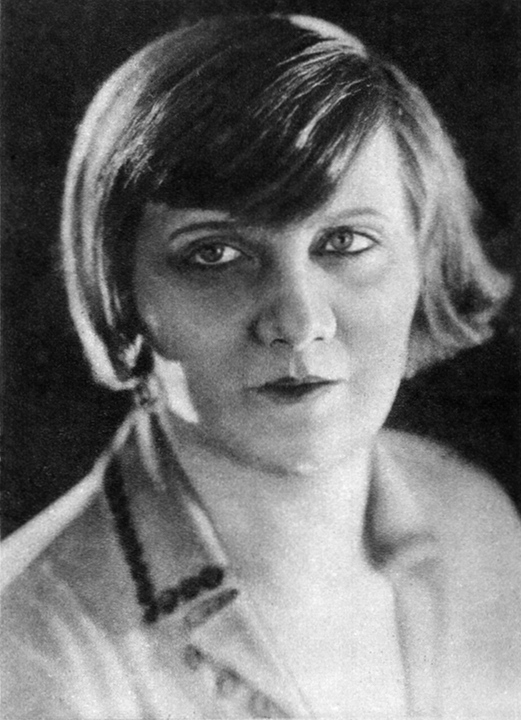
- Born: 3 August 1891; Strakonice, Austria-Hungary
- Died: 23 May 1928 (aged 36); Prague, Czechoslovakia
- Occupation: Actress
- Spouse: Emil Artur Longen

Xena Longenová (3 August 1891 – 23 May 1928), born Polyxena Marková, was a Czechoslovak actress, best known on the Prague stage. She also made one silent film, Prach a broky (1926).

== Early life ==
Polyxena Marková was born in Strakonice, the daughter of actor Antonín Marek (1862–1938), and the sister of actors Vladimir and Adolf Marek.

== Career ==
Longenová was a popular stage actress, often appearing with her actor husband in Prague cabarets, but also in Paris, Berlin, Brno, and Ljubljana. She created the lead role in her husband's adaptation of Egon Erwin Kisch's The Ascension of Tonka Šibenice. She appeared in one silent film, a comedy, Prach a broky (1926, now lost).

== Personal life ==
She married writer, artist, and actor Emil Artur Longen (born Emil Pitterman) in 1910. Longenová, unhappy in her marriage and using cocaine and morphine, died by suicide in 1928, aged 36 years, in Prague. Her niece was actress Heda Marková.

E. A. Longen wrote a novel based on his wife's story, The Actress. Franta Sauer wrote a biography of the Longens, Emil Artur Longen a Xena (1936).
