= Falešný hráč =

- Directed by: Jaroslav Hurt
- Written by: Jirí Dimmer
- Starring: Anna Sedlácková
- Cinematography: Max Urban
- Release date: 2 February 1913
- Country: Austria-Hungary
- Languages: Silent; Czech intertitles

Falešný hráč is a 1912 Austro-Hungarian drama film directed by Jaroslav Hurt. "The film was initially banned by censorship. Some data from the general list of editor Venclík, stored in the National Film Archive. The film materials are considered lost."

"The actor Jaroslav Hurt made his directorial debut, and he would go on to have considerable importance in another field of entertainment, as the initiator of radio dramaturgy and direction in Czechoslovakia."

== Cast ==
- Anna Sedlácková
- Rudolf Kafka
- Jaroslav Hurt
- Jára Sedlácek
- Vilém Rittershain
- Jirí Dimmer
- Alois Sedlácek
