= Rudi na křtinách =

- Directed by: Emil Artur Longen, Antonín Pech
- Written by: Emil Artur Longen, Antonín Pech
- Starring: Emil Artur Longen, Rudolf Sůva, Josef Waltner
- Production company: Kinofa
- Release date: 1911
- Country: Austria-Hungary

Rudi na křtinách is a 1911 Austro-Hungarian comedy film. It is one of a series of four films written by and starring Emil Artur Longen as the title character, Rudi. It was filmed in Prague.
