= Idyla ze staré Prahy =

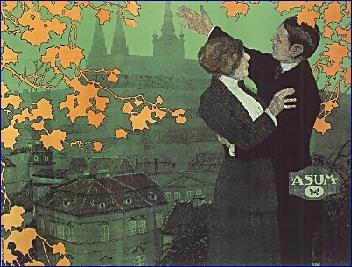
- Theatrical release poster
- Directed by: Max Urban
- Written by: Max Urban
- Production company: ASUM
- Release date: 13 September 1918
- Countries: Bohemia, Austria-Hungary
- Languages: Silent; Czech intertitles

Idyla ze staré Prahy ("Old Prague Idyll") is a 1918 Bohemian/Czech romantic drama film, which was directed by architect, producer and amateur director Max Urban. The film was made in 1913 but released in 1918, which was near the end of the World War I and six weeks before the creation of Czechoslovakia. The film is now lost, so the plot and runtime aren't known. The main role was played by Anna Sedláčková, the director's wife.

In history of Czech cinema, this film is renowned for one other feature: the movie poster (by Josef Wenig, 1918) is the oldest extant poster of Czech origin.

== Cast ==
- Karel Váňa as Gardener
- Anna Sedláčková
- Miloš Vávra
- Lída Sudová
- Zdenka Rydlová-Kvapilová
- Alois Sedláček
