= Rudi se žení =

- Directed by: Emil Artur Longen, Antonín Pech
- Written by: Emil Artur Longen, Antonín Pech
- Starring: Emil Artur Longen
- Release date: 1911

Rudi se žení was a 1911 Austro-Hungarian comedy film. It was one of a series of four films written by and starring Emil Artur Longen as the title character, Rudi. This film was never finished and all of its material has been lost.
