= Pan profesor, nepřítel žen =

1913 film

Pan profesor, nepřítel žen is a 1913 Austro-Hungarian comedy film. It was directed by Jiří Steimar, who also played the lead role.

"The introductory shots of the actors, according to information from contemporaries of the time, were coloured by hand. The film materials are believed lost.", according to filmovyprehled.
