= Věra Machoninová =

Czech Brutalist architect (born 1928)

- Born: Věra Větrovská; 27 September 1928; Strakonice, First Czechoslovak Republic
- Education: Czech Technical University in Prague
- Spouse: Vladimír Machonin

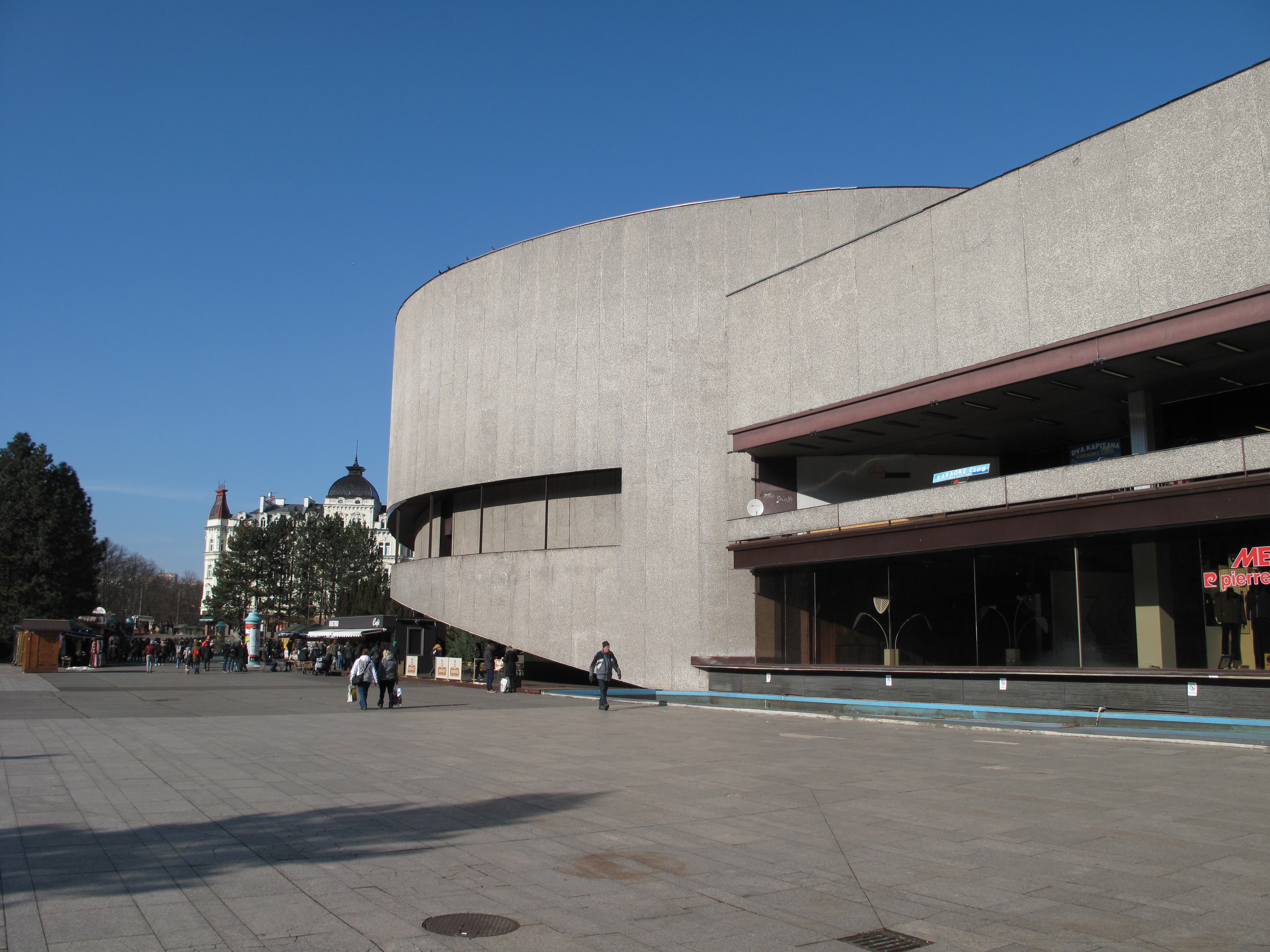
Hotel Thermal

Věra Machoninová (born 27 September 1928) is a Czech Brutalist architect who completed a number of projects with her husband Vladimír Machonin.

== Education ==
Věra Větrovská was born in 1928 in Strakonice, First Czechoslovak Republic. Větrovská attended the Czech Technical University in Prague's Faculty of Architecture. At the university she met Vladimír Machonin, whom she married in 1948. In 1952, Machoninová completed her studies and graduated.

== Gallery ==
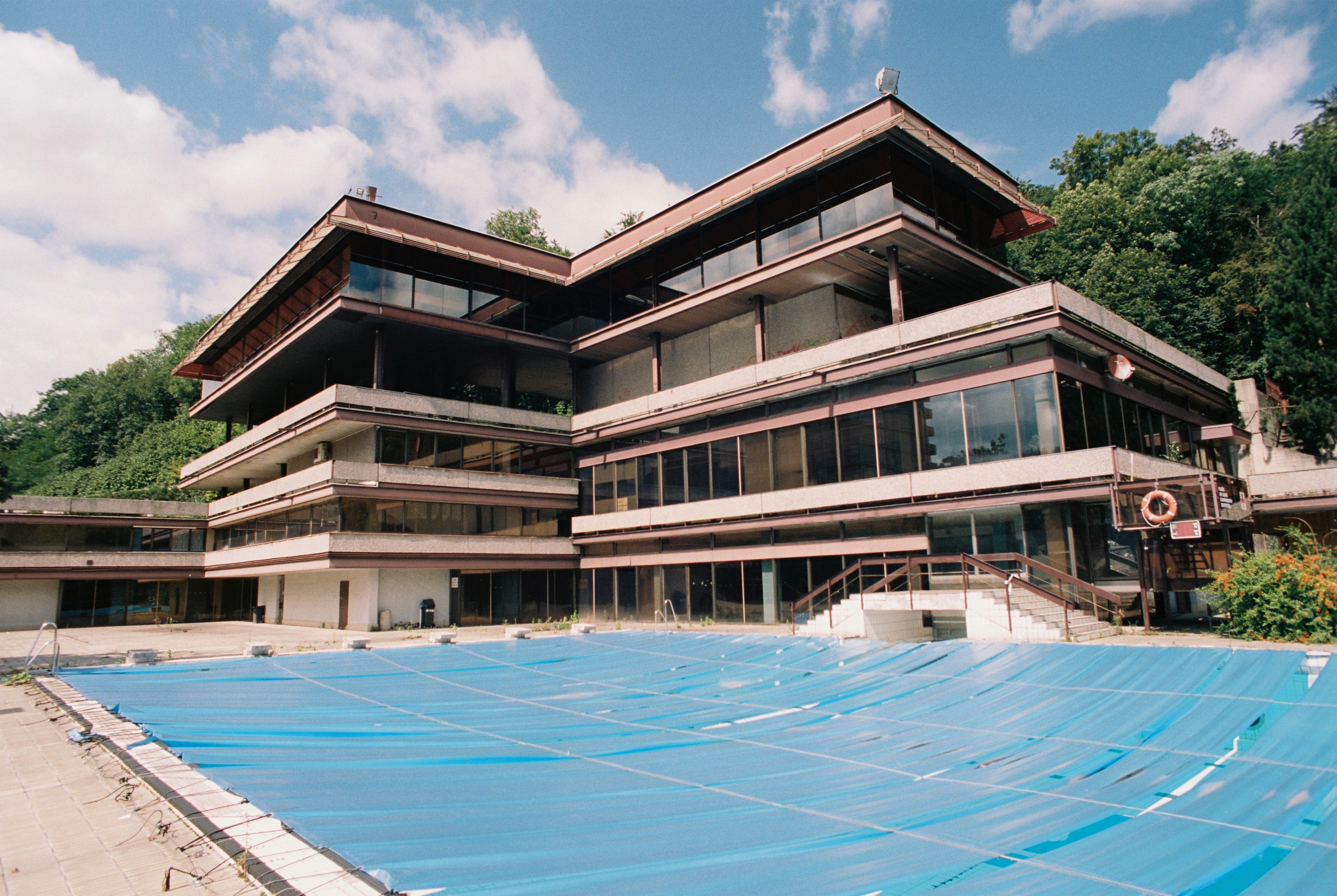
Pool at Hotel Thermal (1964), Karlovy Vary, Czech Republic

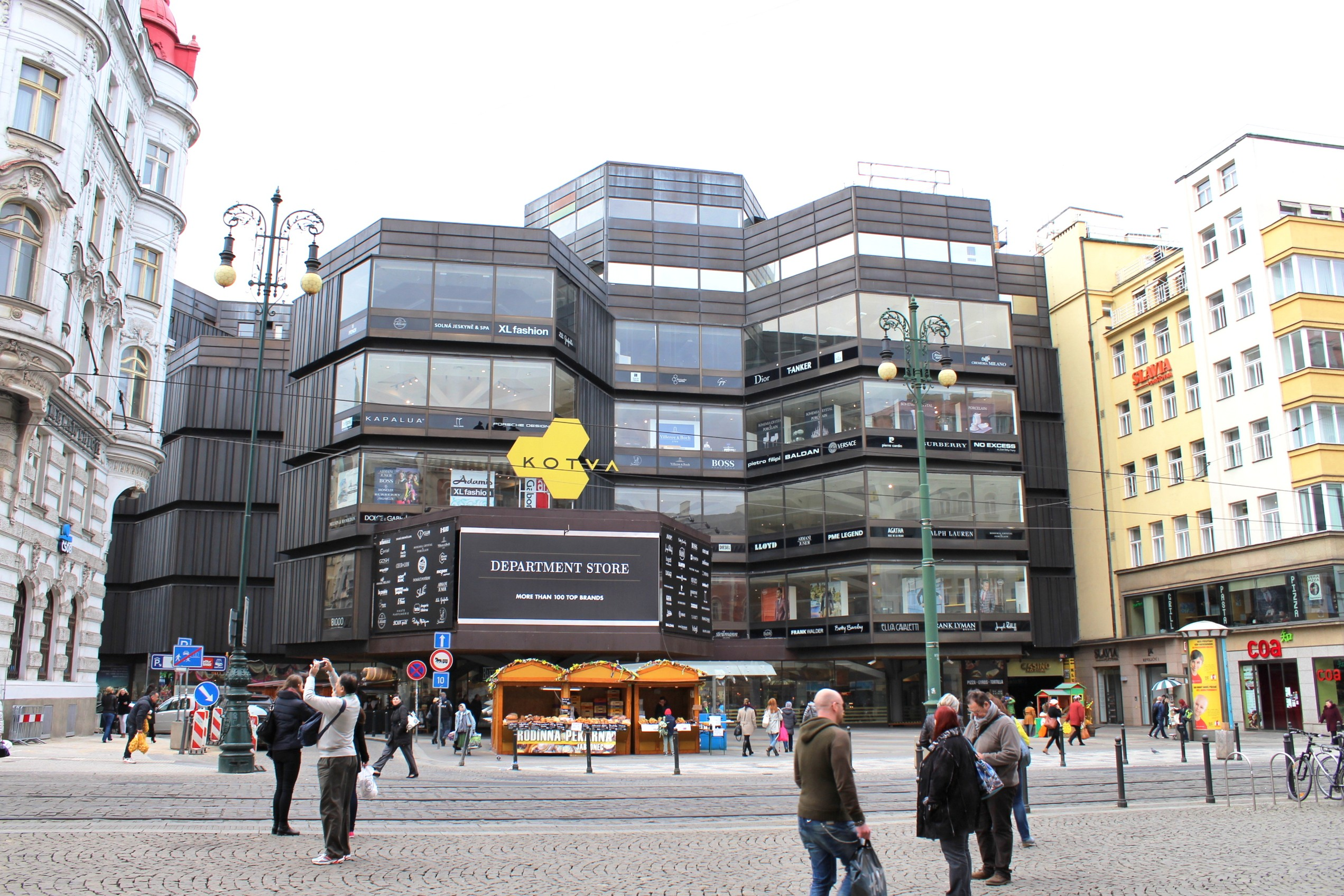
Kotva Department Store (1970), Prague

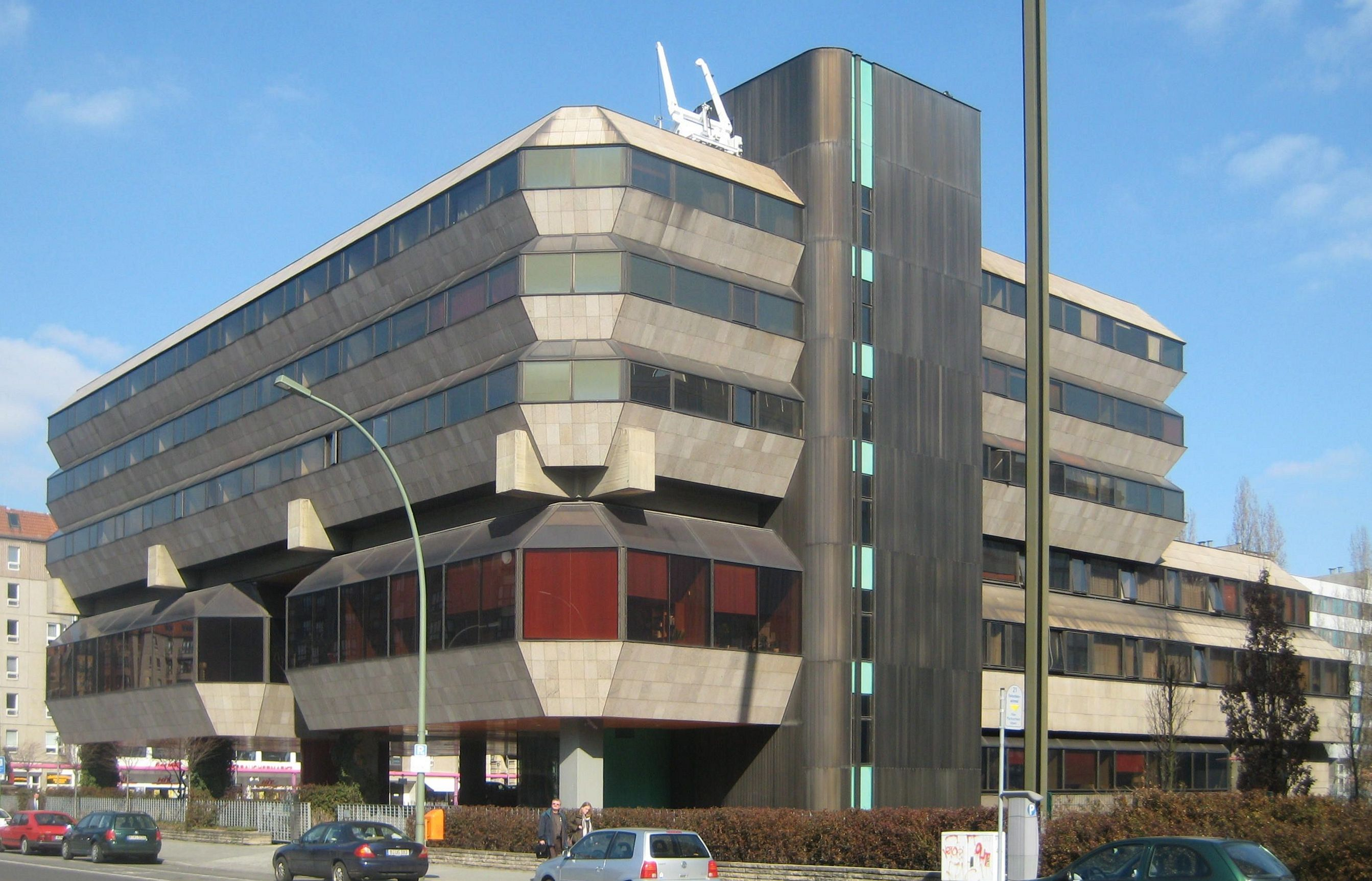
Czech Embassy (1972), Berlin

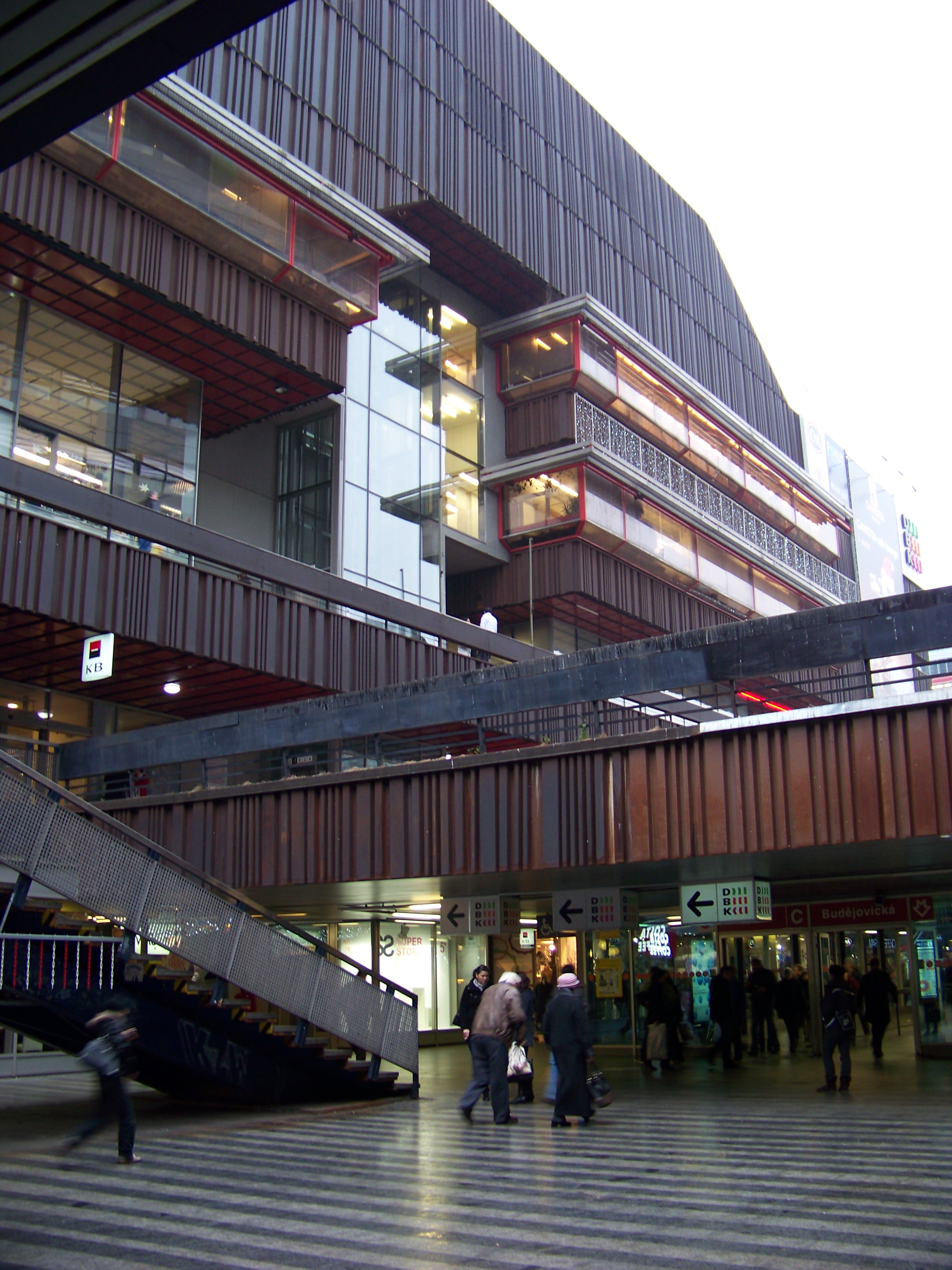
DBK Shopping Center (1981), Krč, Czech Republic
