= Hotel Paris Prague =

5-star luxury hotel in Prague, Czech Repuclic

Hotel Paris

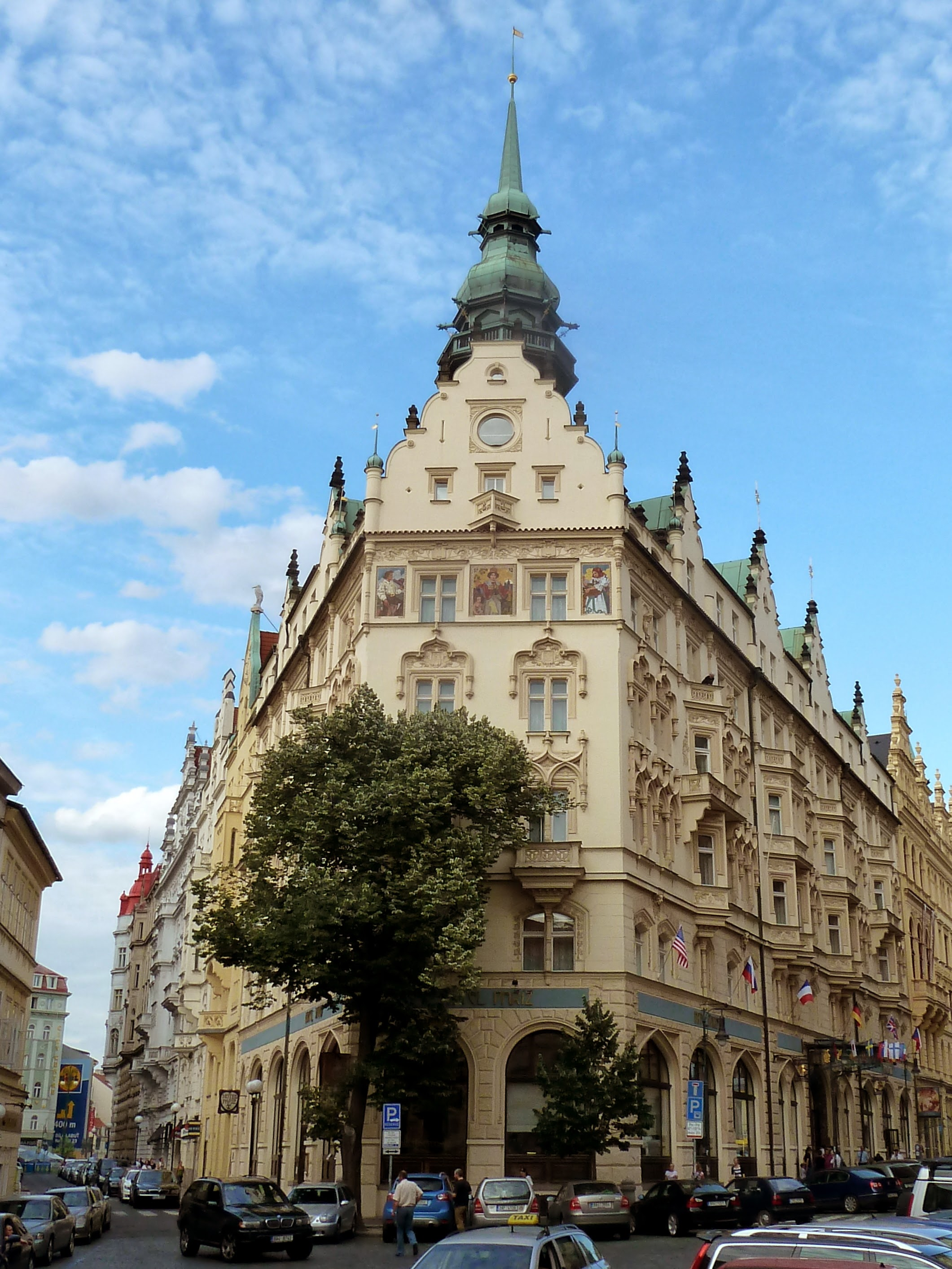
- Interactive map of the Hotel Paris area

General information
- Location: U Obecního domu 1, Prague, Czech Republic, 110 00
- Coordinates: 50°5′17.59″N 14°25′37.6″E
- Opening: 1904
- Owner: Brandejs family

Design and construction
- Architect: Jan Vejrych

Website
- www.hotel-paris.cz/en/

Hotel Paris Prague (Czech: Hotel Paříž Praha) is a 5-star luxury hotel in Prague, Czech Republic. It is located in the centre of Prague in Old Town. It was built in 1904 according to plans of Jan Vejrych. Its architectural style is a mixture of Art Nouveau and Gothic Revival. It featured as a location in Bohumil Hrabal's book I Served the King of England. In 1984, it was declared as a historical monument.
