= Cholera v Praze =

1914 film directed by Alois Jalovec

- Directed by: Alois Jalovec
- Written by: Katy Kaclová-Valisová; Antonín Michl
- Starring: Antonín Michl
- Release date: 16 January 1914
- Country: Austria-Hungary
- Language: Czech

Cholera v Praze, '(Cholera in Prague)' is a 1914 Austro-Hungarian comedy film directed by Alois Jalovec.

== Cast ==
- Antonín Michl as Cobbler
- Katy Kaclová-Valisová as Cobbler's Daughter
- Frantisek Fort as Suitor
- Rudolf Innemann
- Miroslav Innemann
