= Kotva Department Store =

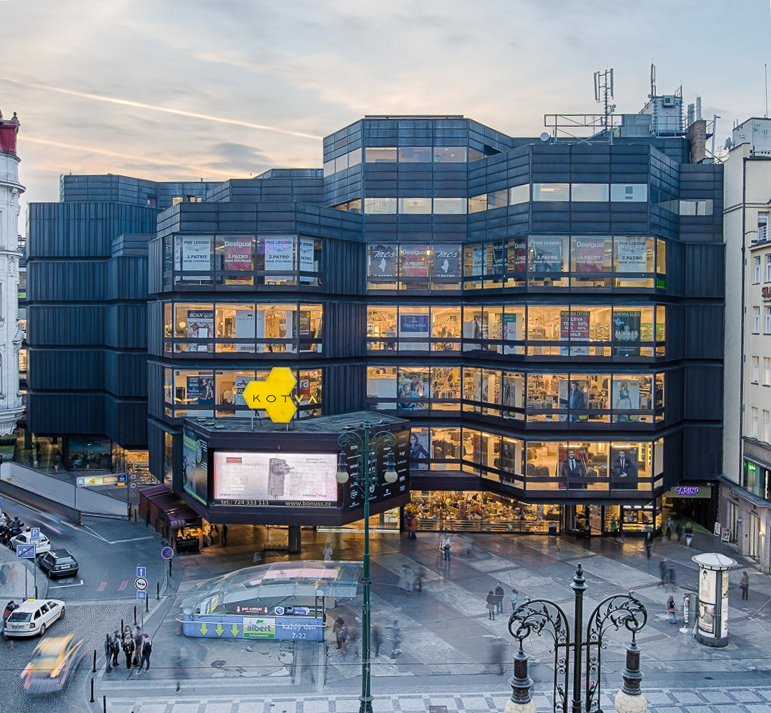
- Location: Náměstí Republiky, Prague
- Coordinates: 50.0889°N 14.4272°E
- Address: Náměstí Republiky 656/8
- Opened: 10 February 1975
- Architect: Vladimír Machonin, Věra Machoninová
- Floors: 5
- Parking: 360 spaces
- Public transit: Náměstí Republiky metro station
- Website: od-kotva.cz/en/

Kotva Department Store (Czech: Obchodní dům Kotva) is a department store in Prague on Náměstí Republiky (Republic Square). Its name, meaning anchor in English, comes from an older neighboring building.

It was a member of the International Association of Department Stores from 1993 to 2000.

== Historic build-up area ==
On the site of the department store stood the Romanesque church of St. Benedict. Before the mid-13th century, there was a commandry of Prague Teutonic Knights which had a fortress character and was related to current fortifications built in the Old Town. Strahov premonstratensians in the 17th century established a campus Norbertinum here and a baroque church was rebuilt according to plans by Domenico Orsi, newly consecrated as St. Norbert. The church was demolished in the late 18th century due to the construction of the New Town noblewomen Institute. During the construction of the department store, valuable houses from the 19th and 20th century were demolished. Due to time pressure during construction, significant archeologic areas were lost.

== Construction ==
The Kotva department store was created between 1970 and 1975, designed by Czech architect couple Věra Machoninová and Vladimir Machonin. It was built by the Swedish construction company SIAB, which was at that time very unusual. The floor plan consists of multiple intertwined hexagons. Kotva has five stories above ground, a total of ten interconnected escalators (two shafts of five escalators) and about the same number underground, serving as a garage and supermarket. It was intended to become a symbol of abundance and wealth in socialism. At the time of construction it was the largest department store in the Czechoslovak Socialist Republic. Kotva did not avoid supply problems, which showed the weakness of the country's economy. Until the 1990s, the store offered a diverse range of products, today its focus is on clothing and fashion goods.

== Monument declaration ==
In 2007, architectural historian Rostislav Švácha suggested the Ministry of Culture declare the building a cultural monument because it represents a highpoint in Czech architecture of the first half of the 1970s and its visual and structural concept is peculiarly dealing with the suggestions of several directions in the post-war world of architecture. A similar architectural character began to be used before the Second World War by Frank Lloyd Wright. This request failed.

In 2018, Kotva Department Store became a Czech cultural monument. This was finalised in April 2019, following a 2016 request for it to be added to the list.

== Current ==
In 2025 the Kotva building is undergoing a major renovation, led by Generali Real Estate, which acquired the property in 2020. The company has embarked on an ambitious CZK 2 billion redevelopment project, expected to take two years. Upon completion, the lower two floors will be dedicated to fashion, cosmetics, and jewelry, while the upper floors will be transformed into office spaces.
