= Náměstí Republiky, Prague =

City square in Czechia

Coordinates: 50°5′18″N 14°25′43″E

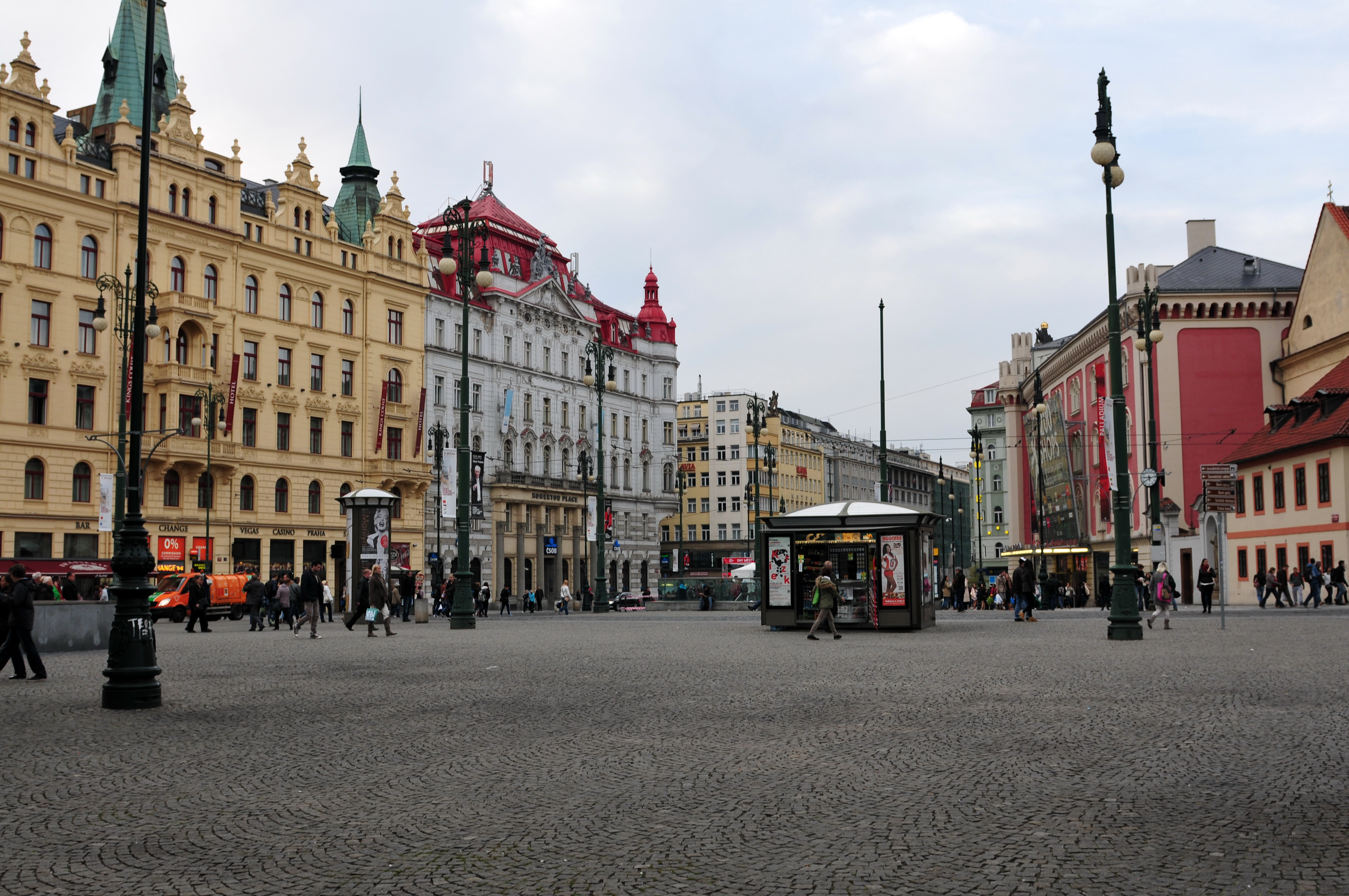
Náměstí Republiky

Náměstí Republiky (Republic Square) is a city square in Prague, Czech Republic, lying at the boundary of the Old Town and New Town. On the square, or in the very near vicinity, are these significant buildings: Kotva Department Store, Municipal House, Powder Tower, Czech National Bank and Palladium shopping mall. From the square leads Na příkopě street, the most expensive street in all of the V4, connecting it with the Wenceslas Square.
