= Podkova (film) =

Podkova (The Horseshoe)
- Directed by: Max Urban
- Written by: Anna Sedlácková
- Starring: Karel Vána
- Production company: Asuma
- Release date: 1913
- Country: Austria-Hungary

Podkova is a 1913 Austro-Hungarian comedy film directed by Max Urban and written by his wife, Anna Sedlácková. In it, a young man finds a horseshoe and keeps it, thinking it will bring him luck. The opposite is true.
