= Barrandov Terraces =

Coordinates: 50°2′15.3″N 14°24′9″E

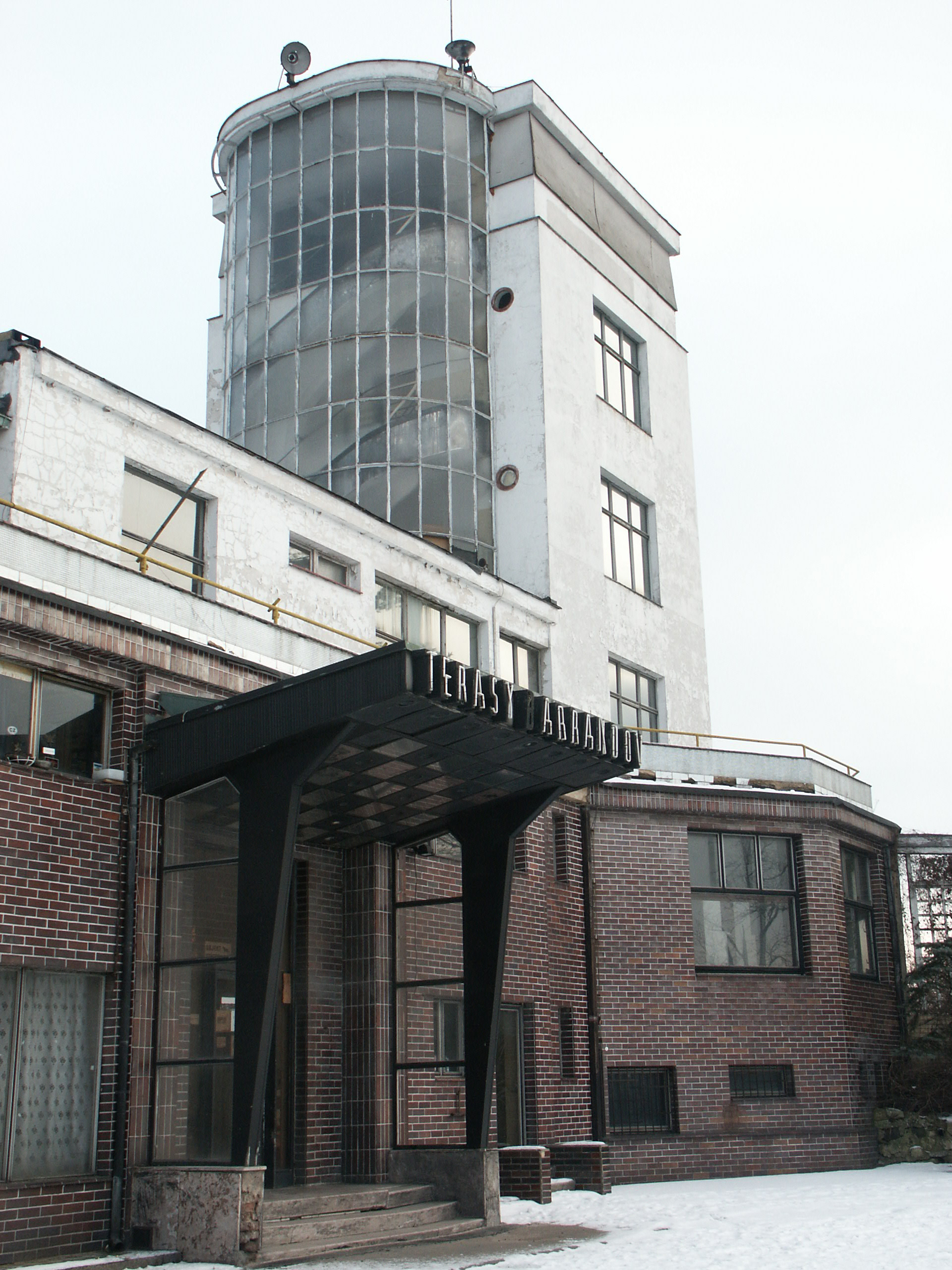
Barrandov Terraces

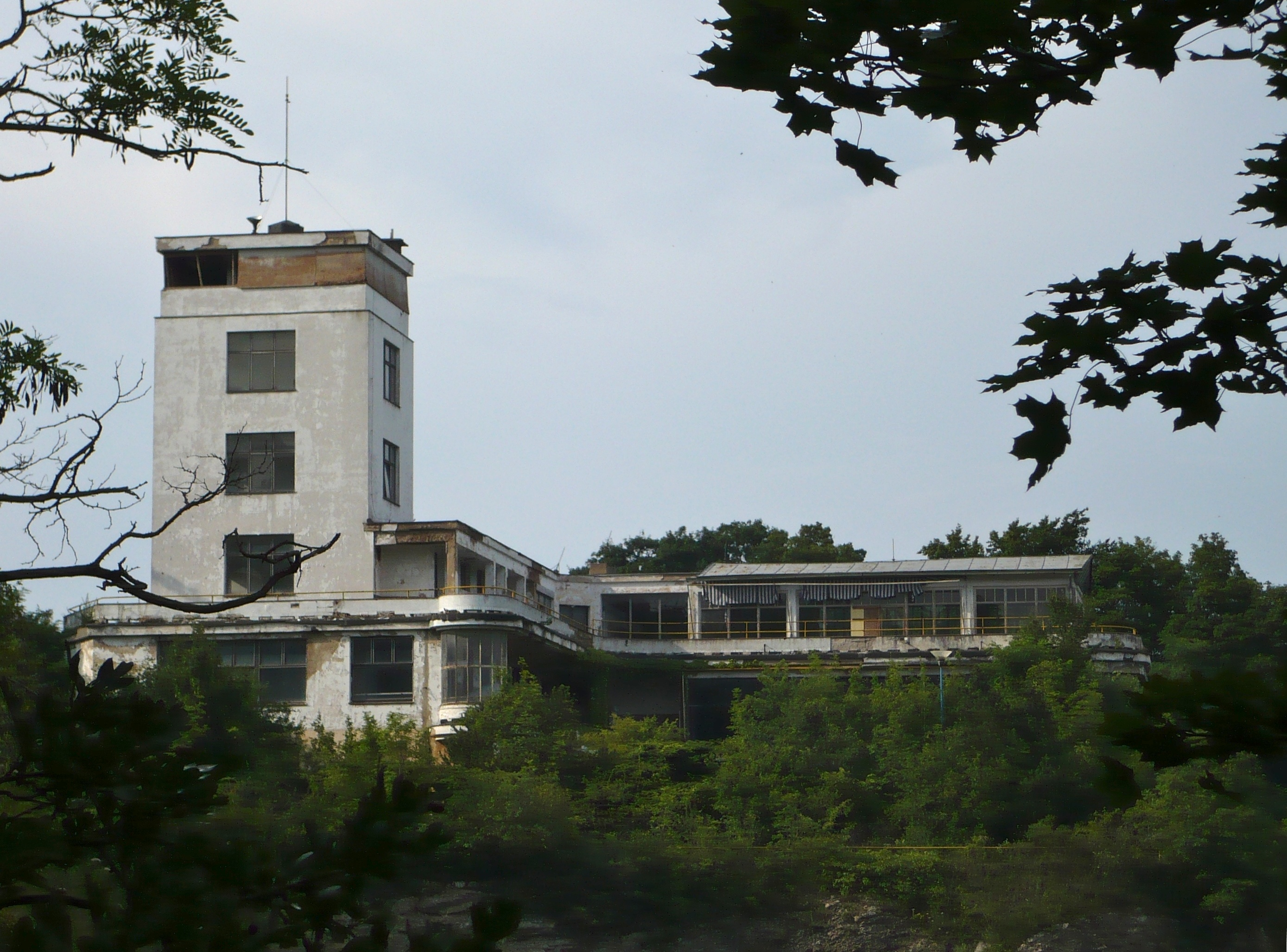
View from the south (2009)

Barrandov Terraces (Czech: Barrandovské terasy) is a complex of buildings in the southern part of Prague, Czech Republic. It is dominated by the functional view restaurant Terraces (Czech: Terasy) designed by architect Max Urban (1927–31). Barrandov Terraces are a part of the project of Václav M. Havel for the construction of a neighbourhood on the slope of the Habrová hill. The project was inspired by Cliff House near San Francisco. The building is owned by the Barrandovské terasy, a.s. company, whose major shareholder is Michalis Dzikos.

== History ==
After the Second World War Barrandov Terraces were nationalized by the state. In 1982 the popular Trilobit bar was closed.

In 1992 the complex was returned to the Havel family, specifically to brothers Ivan and Václav, sons of Václav M. Havel. Ivan M. Havel transferred his share ownership to his wife Dagmar. After a couple of years Václav Havel transferred his ownership share to his second wife Dagmar Havlová, who in turn purchased from the wife of Ivan Havel her share for more than 20 million Czech koruna (CZK). The swimming pool, a property acquired from the company Vodní stavby for 900,000 CZK in 1994 was excluded from the deal. In October 2001 the dilapidated Trilobit bar burned down; it was at that time a refuge for a small group of homeless people.

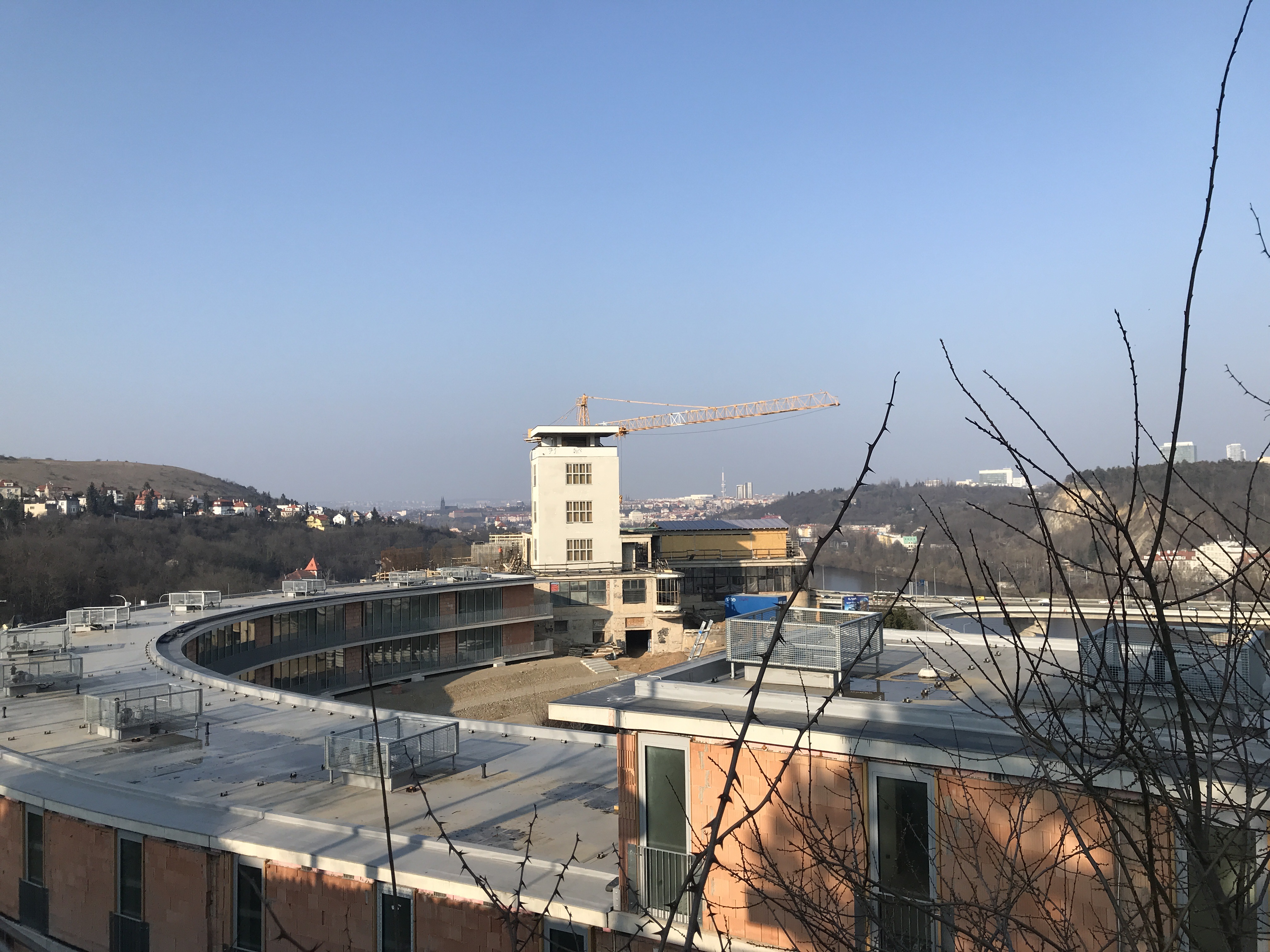
Construction of Barrandovské terasy hotel in 2021

In August 2001 Dagmar Havlová transferred Barrandov Terraces to her company Barrandovské terasy, a.s. and two years later sold her majority stake in the company to an unknown investor. A project for the reconstruction of Barrandov Terraces includes a plan for construction of a hotel, which is likely to improve the profitability of the project. The reconstructed hotel was originally planned to have a 2014 opening, but this deadline was later cancelled due to economic factors. Preparations for the start of reconstruction began in May 2016.
