= The Old Bachelor's Dream =

- Directed by: Josef Kricenský
- Written by: Josef Kricenský
- Starring: Josef Kricenský
- Cinematography: Jan Krízenecký
- Release date: 7 February 1913
- Country: Austria-Hungary
- Languages: Silent; Czech intertitles

The Old Bachelor's Dream (Czech: Jarní sen starého mládence) is a 1913 Austro-Hungarian comedy film directed by Josef Kricenský. It was produced in 1910 and released on 7 February 1913.

== Cast ==
- Josef Kricenský as Tobiás
- Ferry Seidl as Oskar
- Berta Friedrichová as Lilly
- Marie Demartiniová-Hradcanská as Landlady
- Otto Zahrádka as Forester
- Bohumil Kovár as Landlord
