= Emil Artur Longen =

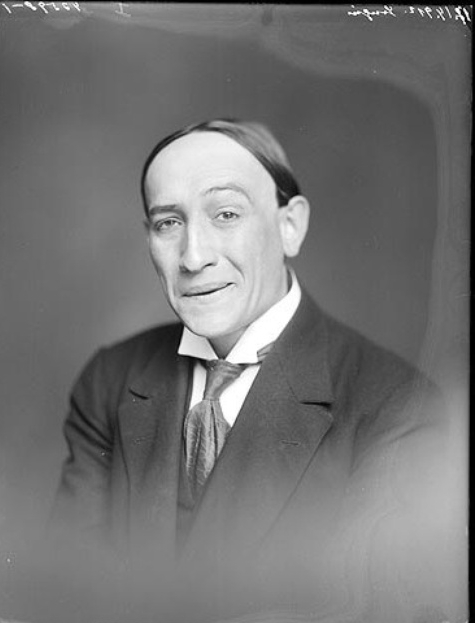
Emil Artur Longen (1912, made up for a part)

Emil Artur Longen (born Emil Václav František Pitterman (29 July 1885 – 24 April 1936) was a Czech playwright, director, actor, screenwriter and painter. He was initially drawn to Post-Impressionism and Expressionism, but was also influenced by Cubism. In addition to painting, he created illustrations and caricatures for various periodicals.

== Biography ==
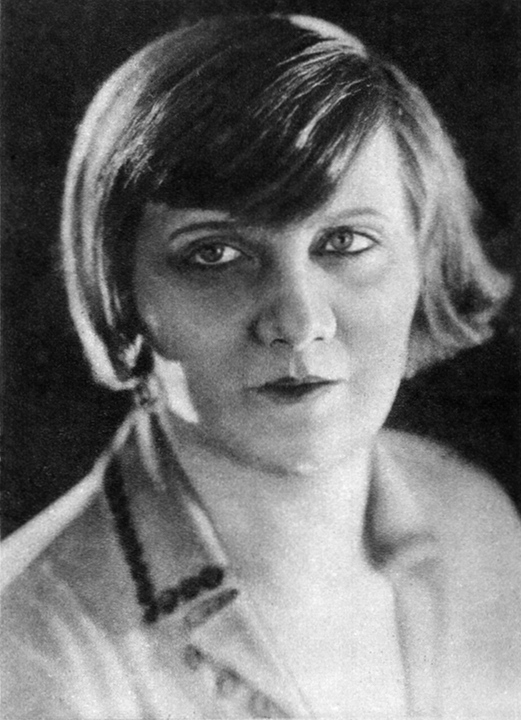
His first wife, Xena

Longen was born Emil Václav František Pitterman on 29 July 1885 in Pardubice, Bohemia, Austria-Hungary. His father was a notary, originally from Vlašim. After 1904, he studied at the Academy of Fine Arts, Prague, with Franz Thiele. In 1907, he participated in founding the artists' association, Osma. He was expelled from the Academy in 1908, for disciplinary infractions.

Although focused on art, he was also attracted to the theatre and the cabaret. Around 1909, he began to collaborate with the writer and actor, Eduard Bass. It was then that he first used the pseudonym "Longen". Over the next twenty years, he would become a prominent figure in many Prague cabarets, including the famous Červená sedma ('Red Seven'). In 1910, he married the actress Xena Marková.

In 1911, he made his mark at the beginnings of Czech cinema, co-authoring and starring in a series of four short comedies about a bon-vivant named Rudi. He also directed the last film in the series, Rudi sportsman.

He opened his own cabarets in 1920: Bum (Boom) and Revoluční scéna (The Revolutionary Scene). In 1921, he was in his first full-length silent film; Otrávené světlo (The Poisoned Light), playing a magician opposite Karel Lamač and Anny Ondra. For a time, he also worked abroad; in Paris, Ljubljana and Berlin. Back in Prague in 1925, he and the director, Vladimír Gamza, agreed to merge their theatre companies to create a new company named Sečesteal (an acronym for "Spojené ensembly Českého studia E. A. Longena"). It was short-lived, however, so he became an actor and dramaturge at the new Vlasta Burian Theatre. While there, in 1927, he wrote a biography of the theatre's founder, the comedian Vlasta Burian.

Despite his professional successes, his marriage proved to be a very unhappy one. Xena felt disrespected, became depressed, addicted to morphine and cocaine and, in 1928, committed suicide by jumping from a window. Later that same year, he remarried, to Maria Uhlířová, apparently also an actress, and they had two children. He wrote a biographical novel in Xena's honor, called Herečka (Actress)

Since his student days, he had been known for his Bohemian lifestyle and explosive temperament, and was intoxicated almost daily. Much of his considerable income was squandered, and he was perpetually in debt. During the last half of his life, his paintings increasingly came to serve as little more than a way to help pay those debts. He died on 24 April 1936 in the Benešov Hospital, at the age of fifty, from a perforated ulcer.

== Selected paintings ==
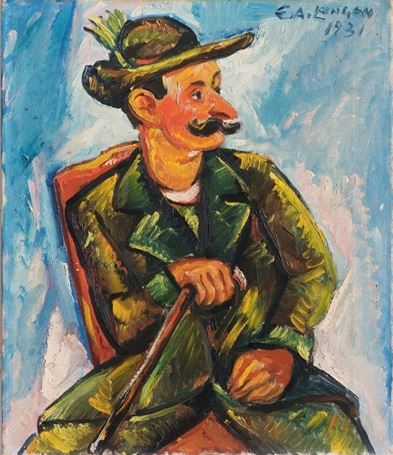
Portrait of Vlasta Burian

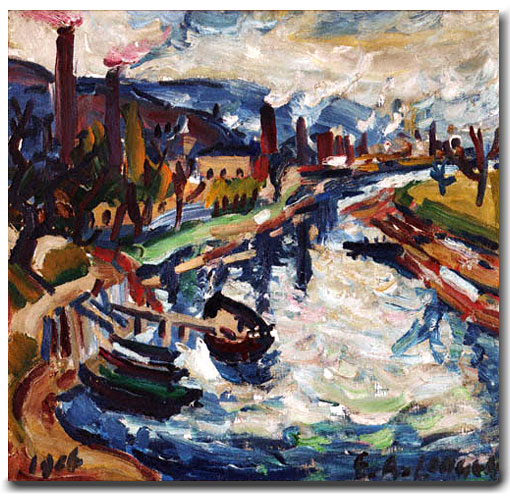
Factory on the River Bank

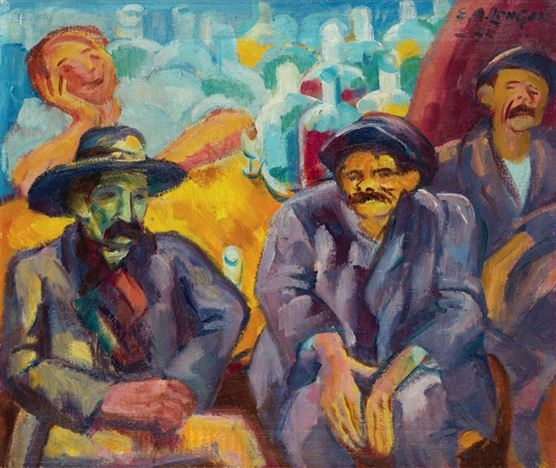
In the Bar

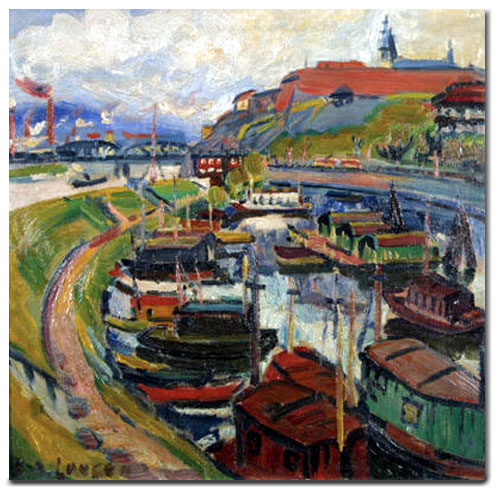
Prague Harbor

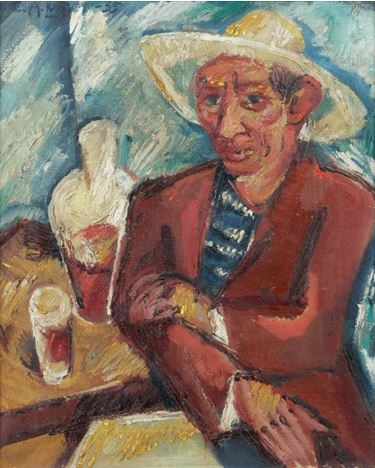
Captured by Alcohol
(self-portrait)
