= Max Urban (architect) =

Czech architect and filmmaker (1882–1959)

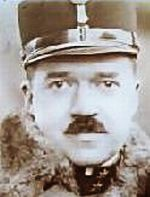
- Born: 24 August 1882; Prague, Austria-Hungary
- Died: 17 July 1959 (aged 76); Prague, Czechoslovakia
- Occupations: Architect, filmmaker

Max Urban (24 August 1882 – 17 July 1959) was a Czech architect and filmmaker. After studying at the Czech Technical University in Prague he worked as a pioneering filmmaker in the years before the First World War. He collaborated with his wife, the actress Andula Sedláčková, and worked as a screenwriter, cinematographer and film director. After the conflict, and Czechoslovakia's independence from Austria-Hungary, he focused on his architectural career. Among his most notable works was the Barrandov Studios in Prague, noted for its modern design. He also designed the Barrandov Terraces complex of buildings.
