= List of Czechoslovak films =

A list of films produced in the historical country of Czechoslovakia. As yet only work has been completed on 1898–1935. For films of the Czech Republic from 1991 onwards please see List of Czech Republic films.

== 1898–1918 ==
(as part of Austria-Hungary)

Title	Director	Cast	Genre	Notes
1898
Dostaveníčko ve mlýnici	Jan Kříženecký	Josef Malostranský	Farce	
Smích a pláč	Jan Kříženecký			
Výstavní párkař a lepič plakátů	Jan Kříženecký		Farce	
1907
Nejlepší číslo	Jan Kříženecký			
1910
Jarní sen starého mládence	Jan Kříženecký	Ferry Seidl, Berta Friedrichová	Comedy	
1911
Hubička	Antonín Pech		Comedy	
Ponrepovo kouzelnictví	Antonín Pech	Viktor Ponrepo		
Rudi na křtinách	Antonín Pech	Emil Artur Longen, Rudolf Sůva	Comedy	
Rudi na záletech	Antonín Pech	Emil Artur Longen	Farce	
Rudi se žení	Antonín Pech	Emil Artur Longen		
Rudi sportsman	Antonín Pech	Emil Artur Longen	Farce	
Sokové	Antonín Pech			
1912
Dáma s barzojem	Max Urban		Drama	
Falešný hráč	Jaroslav Hurt		Drama	
Pro peníze	Antonín Pech		Drama	
Svatojanské proudy	Antonín Pech			
Záhadný zločin	Rudolf Kafka		Drama	
1913
Zub za zub	Antonín Pech			
Pět smyslu člověka	J.Malostranský		Comedy	
Americký souboj	Otakar Štáfl		Comedy	
Estrella	Max Urban		Melodrama	
Cholera v Praze	Alois Jalovec		Comedy	
Idyla ze staré Prahy	Max Urban		Drama	
Pan profesor, nepřítel zen	Jiří Steimar		Comedy	
Podkova	Max Urban			
Prodoná nevěsta	Max Urban		Comedy	
Rozvedená paní	Max Urban			
Šaty dělají člověka	Max Urban			
Šoférka	Max Urban			
Tragédie ve sněhu	Rudolf Kafka			
Zkažená krev	Alois Wiesner			
1914
Andula žárlí	Otakar Štáfl		Comedy	
Nenávistí k lásce	Otakar Štáfl	Jára Sedláček		
Noční děs	Jan A. Palouš		Comedy	
Zamilovaná tchyně	Antonín Pech	Alois Jalovec, Katy Kaclová-Vališová		
1917
The Prague Adamites	Antonín Fencl	Josef Vošalík, Terezie Javůrková		

== 1919 ==
Title	Director	Cast	Genre	Notes
1919
Akord smrti	Jan S. Kolár, Karel Lamač	Lea Vercy, Karel Lamač, Josef Rovenský	Romance	
Boby nesmí kouřit	Přemysl Pražský		Comedy	
Byl první máj	Thea Červenková	Svatopluk Innemann, Eva Levínská, Ludmila Innemannová	Comedy	
Divoká Maryna	Vladimír Slavínský		Comedy	
Lady with the Small Foot	Jan S. Kolár, Přemysl Pražský	Olga Augustová	Comedy	
Láska je utrpením	Přemysl Pražský, Vladimír Slavínský		Drama	
One Night at Karlštejn Castle	Olaf Larus-Racek	Josef Bělský, Berta Šíblová-Zuzáková, Málka Tuháčková	Comedy	
Papá	Joe Jenčík		Comedy	
Probuzené svědomí	Robert Zdráhal	Karel Schleichert, Anči Jelínková	Drama	
Sneženka z Tater	Olaf Larus-Racek		Drama	
Teddy by kouřil	Gustav Machatý		Comedy	
The Man Who Built the Catedral	Karel Degl, Antonín Novotný	Jakub Seifert, Rudolf Deyl sr.	Historical	

== 1920s ==
Title	Director	Cast	Genre	Notes
1920
Dráteníček				
Gilly poprvé v Praze				
Little Red Riding Hood				
Magdalena				
Nikyho velebné dobrodružství				
Setřelé písmo				
Sněženky				
Tam na horách				
Two Mothers				
Za svobodu národa				
Zlatá žena				
Zpěv zlata				
Sílený lékar			Crime, Horror, Drama	
Melchiad Koloman			Horror, Sci-Fi	
1921
Cikáni				
Děti osudu				
Děvče ze Stříbrné Skalice				
Jánošík	Jaroslav Siakeľ	Theodor Pištěk; Mária Fábryová; Miloslav Schmidt		
Kříž u potoka				
Mnichovo srdce				
Nad propastí				
Otrávené světlo				
Příchozí z temnot			Horror	
Roztržené foto				
Siciliana − Princess Kanningsten's Necklace	Imrich Darányi	Július Oláh, Ada Vojtíšková	Adventure	orig.: Siciliána - Náhrdelník kňažnej Kanningstenovej
Stíny				
Živé mrtvoly				
1922
Adam a Eva				
The Bartered Bride				
Cikán Jura				
Drvoštěp				
Harémy kouzla zbavené				
Likérová princeznička				
Little Witch from the Grove	Ján Moncoľ	Zuzana Piaterová-Koniarová, Zuzana Bútorová	Drama	orig.: Strídža spod hája
The Mysterious Beauty				
Noc tříkrálová				
O velkou cenu				
Proč se nesměješ				
Tulákovo srdce				
Venoušek a Stázička				
Mrtví zijí			Horror	
1923
Muž bez srdce				
Pepánek nezdara				
Problematický gentleman				
Tu ten kámen				
Únos bankéře Fuxe				
Záhadný případ Galginův				
1924
Chyťte ho!				
A Double Life				
Hříchy v manželství				
Kam s ním?				
White Paradise				
1925
Do panského stavu				
From the Czech Mills				
Hraběnka z Podskalí				
Josef Kajetán Tyl				
Karel Havlíček Borovský				
Lucerna				
Okovy				
Šest mušketýrů				
Syn hor				
Tulák				
Vdavky Nanynky Kulichovy				
Vyznavači slunce				
Svatební kosile			Horror	
1926
Bludné duše				
Falešná kočička aneb Když si žena umíní				
The Good Soldier Schweik				
The Kreutzer Sonata				
Lásky Kačenky Strnadové				
Modche a Rézi				
Na letním bytě				
Never the Twain				
Otec Kondelík a ženich Vejvara I				
Otec Kondelík a ženich Vejvara II				
Pantáta Bezoušek				
Prach a oky				
Pražský flamendr				
Příběh jednoho dne				
Švejk v ruském zajetí				
Z lásky				
1927
Aničko, vrať se!				
Bahno Prahy				
Batalión				
Chorus Girls				
Dům ztraceného štěstí				
Květ ze Šumavy				
The Lovers of an Old Criminal				
Schweik in Civilian Life				
Sextánka				
Sladká Josefínka				
V panském stavu				
1928
Eve's Daughters				
Father Vojtech				
Hřích				
Kainovo znamení				
Mlynář a jeho dítě				
Modrý démant				
Podskalák				
V blouznění				
Ve dvou se to lépe táhne				
Zamilovaný vodník				
Životem vedla je láska				
1929
Boží mlýny				
Erotikon				
From the Czech Mills				
Hanka a Jindra				
The Last Testament				
The Monte Cristo of Prague				
The Organist at St. Vitus' Cathedral				
Prague Seamstresses				
Sin of a Beautiful Woman				
Spring Awakening				
Such Is Life				
Through Mountains and Valleys	Karel Plicka		Documentary	orig.: Po horách, po dolách

== 1930s ==
Title	Director	Cast	Genre	Notes
1930
Bezúčelná procházka				
Černé oči, proč pláčete...?				
Chudá holka				
Der falsche Feldmarschall				
Když struny lkají				
A Girl from the Reeperbahn				
Naše jedenáctka				
Svatý Václav				
Tonka of the Gallows	Karel Anton			Based on Nanebevstoupení Tonky Šibenice, novel by Egon Erwin Kisch
Utrpení šedé sestry				
Vendelínův očistec a ráj				
Vše pro lásku				
Za rodnou hroudou				
1931
Aféra plukovníka Redla				
C. a k. polní maršálek				
Dobrý voják Švejk				
Er und seine Schwester				
Der Fall des Generalstabs-Oberst Redl				
Fidlovačka				
Hyppolit a lakáj				
Ihr Junge				
Karel Havlíček Borovský				
Kariéra Pavla Camrdy				
Miláček pluku				
Monsieur le maréchal				
Muži v offsidu				
Na Pražském hradě				
Načeradec, král kibiců				
On a jeho sestra				
Osada mladých snů				
Poslední bohém				
Psohlavci				
Svět bez hranic				
Světlo proniká tmou				
To neznáte Hadimršku				
Ze soboty na neděli				
Operené stíny			Horror	
1932
Anton Špelec, ostrostřelec				
Devčátko, neříkej ne!				
Funebrák				
Gehetzte Menschen				
Kantor ideál				
Lelíček ve službách Sherlocka Holmese				
Madla z cihelny				
Obrácení Ferdyse Pištory				
Peníze nebo život				
Před maturitou				
Právo na hřích				
Pudr a benzin				
Písnickář				
Roi bis, Le				
Růžové kombiné				
Šenkýrka u divoké krásy				
Tisíc za jednu noc				
Wehe, wenn er losgelassen				
Zapadlí vlastenci				
Zlaté ptáče				
1933
Diagnosa X				
Dobrý tramp Bernásek				
Dům na předmestí				
Dvanáct křesel				
Extase	Gustav Machatý	Hedy Kiesler, Aribert Mog	Romantic drama	
Její lékař				
Jindra, hraběnka Ostrovínová				
Jsem děvče s čertem v těle				
Na sluneční straně				
Okénko				
Perníková chaloupka				
Pobočník jeho výsosti				
Professeur Cupidon				
Řeka				
Revizor				
S vyloučením veřejnosti				
Sedmá velmoc				
Skřivánčí píseň				
Srdce za písničku				
Strýček z Ameriky				
Svítání				
Tausend für eine Nacht				
U snědeného krámu				
U svatého Antoníčka				
V tom domečku pod Emauzy				
Zem spieva				
Život je pes				
Záhada modrého pokoje				
1934
Adjutant seiner Hoheit				
Anita v ráji				
Doppelbräutigam, Der				
Exekutor v kabaretu				
Hej-Rup!				
Hrdinný kapitán Korkorán				
Hřích mládí				
Marijka nevěrnice				
Matka Kráčmerka				
Mazlíček				
Na růžích ustláno				
Na Svatém Kopečku				
Nezlobte dědečka				
Pokušení paní Antonie				
Polenblut				
Polská krev				
Posel míru				
Poslední muž				
Pozdní máj				
Pán na roztrhání				
Rozpustilá noc				
U nás v Kocourkově				
Volga en flammes				
A Woman Who Knows What She Wants				
Za ranních červánků				
Za řádovými dveřmi				
Žijeme v Praze				
Zlatá Kateřina				
1935
A život jde dál				
Ať žije nebožtík				
Barbora radí				
Bezdětná				
Cácorka				
Held einer Nacht				
Her Highness Dances the Waltz				
Hrdina jedné noci				
Jana				
Jedenácté přikázání				
Jedna z miliónu				
Jánošík				
Koho jsem včera líbal?				
Král ulice				
Liebe auf Bretteln				
Listopad				
Maryša				
Osudná chvíle				
Polibek ve sněhu				
Pozdní láska				
První políbení				
Studentská máma				
Svatá lež				
Tři muži na silnici (slečnu nepočítaje)				
Vdavky Nanynky Kulichovy				
Výkřik do sibiřské noci				
Der Wilderer vom Egerland				
1936
Arme kleine Inge				
Černobílá rapsodie				
Děti velké lásky				
Divoch				
Le Golem			Horror	
Das Gäßchen zum Paradies				
Hra bublinek				
Irčin románek				
Jizdní hlídka				
Komediantská princezna				
Lojzička				
Manželství na úvěr				
Le Mari rêvé				
Mravnost nade vše				
Na tý louce zelený				
Páter Vojtěch				
Rozkošný příběh				
Sextánka				
Srdce v soumraku				
Švadlenka				
Světlo jeho očí				
Trhani				
Tři muži ve sněhu				
Tvoje srdce inkognito				
Ulice zpívá				
Ulička v ráji				
Uličnice				
Velbloud uchem jehly				
Vojnarka				
Vzdušné torpédo 48				
1937
1938

== 1940s ==
Title	Director	Cast	Genre	Notes
1945
1946
1947
1948
Podobizna			Horror	
1949

== 1950s ==
Title	Director	Cast	Genre	Notes
1950
Bajaja	Jiří Trnka		Animation, fantasy	Awarded a Golden Leopard at the 1954 Locarno International Film Festival
Katka	Ján Kadár	Božena Obrová, Július Pántik	Comedy	
Pára nad hrncem	Miroslav Cikán	Vladimír Ráž, Eva Kavanová	Comedy	
Past	Martin Frič	Vlasta Chramostová, Jindra Hermanová	Drama	Entered into the 1951 Cannes Film Festival
Posel úsvitu	Václav Krška	Vladimír Ráž, Hana Kavalírová	Drama	
Priehrada	Paľo Bielik	Alexander Kautnik, Gustáv Valach	Drama	
Racek má zpoždění	Josef Mach	Vladimír Řepa, Rudolf Deyl Jr.	Comedy	
Temno	Karel Steklý	Otýlie Benísková, Zdenek Bittl	Drama	After the novel Temno by Alois Jirásek
1951
Akce B	Josef Mach	Josef Bek, Rudolf Deyl Jr.	Adventure, drama	
Boj sa skončí zajtra	Miroslav Cikán	Elo Romančík, Vladimír Petruska	Drama	Awarded the Special Jury Prize at the 1954 Karlovy Vary International Film Festival
Císařův pekař a pekařův císař	Martin Frič	Jan Werich, Marie Vásová	Comedy, fantasy	
DS-70 nevyjíždí	Vladimír Slavínský	Rudolf Deyl Jr., Ladislav H. Struna	Drama	
Mikolás Ales	Václav Krška	Karel Höger, Dana Medřická	Biographical, drama	Fictionalized biography of Mikolás Ales
O zlaté rybce	Jiří Trnka		Animation, short	
Veselý cirkus	Jiří Trnka		Animation, short	
1952
Dovolená s Andělem	Bořivoj Zeman	Jaroslav Marvan, Josef Pehr	Comedy	
Dúha nad Slovenskom	Vladimír Bahna		Documentary	
Lazy sa pohli	Paľo Bielik	Antos Tihelka, Oľga Adamčíková	Drama	
Mladá léta	Václav Krška	Eduard Cupák, Nataša Tanská	Biographical, drama	Fictionalized biography of Alois Jirásek
Pyšná princezna	Bořivoj Zeman	Alena Vránová, Vladimír Ráž	Comedy, family	
1953
Anna Proletářka	Karel Steklý	Marie Tomášová, Josef Bek	Drama	After the novel Anna Proletářka by Ivan Olbracht
Měsíc nad řekou	Václav Krška	Zdeněk Štěpánek, Zdeňka Baldová	Drama, romance	
Nástup	Otakar Vávra	Ladislav Chudík, Jaroslav Mareš	Drama	
Poklad ptačího ostrova	Karel Zeman		Animation	
Rodná zem	Josef Mach	Martin Tapák, Heda Melicherová	Musical, romance	
Staré pověsti české	Jiří Trnka		Animation	After the book Ancient Bohemian Legends by Alois Jirásek
Tajemství krve	Martin Frič	Vladimír Ráž, Zdeněk Štěpánek	Biographical, drama	Fictionalized biography of Jan Janský
V piatok, trinásteho…	Paľo Bielik	Ondrej Jariabek, Olga Adamcíková	Comedy	
Výstraha	Miroslav Cikán	Jirí Dohnal, Josef Mixa	Drama	
1954
Cirkus bude!	Oldřich Lipský	Jaroslav Marvan, Irena Kacírková	Comedy	
Dnes večer všechno skončí	Vojtěch Jasný, Karel Kachyňa	Eva Kubešová, Josef Vinklář	Drama	
Dva mrazíci	Jiří Trnka		Animation, short	
Jan Hus	Otakar Vávra	Zdeněk Štěpánek, Karel Höger	Biographical, drama, war	Fictionalized biography of Jan Hus; first part of Vávra's Hussite Revolutionary Trilogy
Komedianti	Vladimír Vlcek	Jaroslav Vojta, Ladislav Pešek	Drama	Entered into the 1954 Cannes Film Festival
Nejlepší člověk	Ivo Novák, Václav Wasserman	Vlasta Burian, Stanislav Neumann	Comedy	
Olověný chléb	Jiří Sequens	Ludek Závora, Dagmar Stránská	Drama	
Príďte všetci!	Vladimír Bahna		Documentary, short	
Stříbrný vítr	Václav Krška	Eduard Cupák, Frantisek Slégr	Drama	After the novel Stříbrný vítr by Fráňa Šrámek
1955
Anděl na horách	Bořivoj Zeman	Jaroslav Marvan, Milada Zelenská	Comedy	
Byl jednou jeden král…	Bořivoj Zeman	Jan Werich, Vlasta Burian	Comedy, fantasy	
Cesta do pravěku	Karel Zeman	Vladimír Bejval, Petr Herrman	Adventure, science fiction	
Dobrý voják Švejk	Jiří Trnka		Animation	After the novel The Good Soldier Švejk by Jaroslav Hašek; awarded a Golden Leopard at the 1955 Locarno International Film Festival
Jan Žižka	Otakar Vávra	Zdeněk Štěpánek, Frantisek Horák	Biographical, drama, war	Fictionalized biography of Jan Žižka; second part of Vávra's Hussite Revolutionary Trilogy
Na konci města	Miroslav Cikán	Miloš Nedbal, Gustav Heverle	Crime, drama	
Nechte to na mně	Martin Frič	Oldřich Nový, Theodor Pištěk	Comedy	
Psohlavci	Martin Frič	Vladimír Ráž, Jana Dítětová	Drama	After the novel Psohlavci by Alois Jirásek; entered into the 1955 Cannes Film Festival
Strakonický dudák	Karel Steklý	Josef Bek, Sylva Byšická	Drama	
1956
Čisté ruky	Andrej Lettrich	Karol Machata, Katarína Vrzalová	Drama	
Dalibor	Václav Krška	Václav Bednář, Karel Fiala	Drama, musical	After the opera Dalibor by Bedřich Smetana; entered into the 1956 Cannes Film Festival
Dobrý voják Švejk	Karel Steklý	Rudolf Hrušínský, Svatopluk Beneš	Comedy, war	After the novel The Good Soldier Švejk by Jaroslav Hašek
Hrátky s čertem	Josef Mach	Josef Bek, Eva Klepáčová	Comedy, fantasy	After the play Playing with the Devil by Jan Drda
Labakan	Václav Krška	Eduard Cupák, Karel Fiala	Fantasy	Bulgarian-Czechoslovak co-production; after the fairy tale Das Märchen vom falschen Prinzen by Wilhelm Hauff
Legenda o lásce	Václav Krška	Apostol Karamitev, Zheni Bozhinova	Fantasy, romantic	Bulgarian-Czechoslovak co-production
Muž v povětří	Miroslav Cikán	Vlasta Burian, Milka Balek-Brodská	Comedy	
Proti všem	Otakar Vávra	Zdeněk Štěpánek, Gustav Hilmar	drama, war	After the novel Proti všem by Alois Jirásek; third part of Vávra's Hussite Revolutionary Trilogy
Vina Vladimíra Olmera	Václav Gajer	Eduard Cupák, Jirí Broz	Drama	
Ztracenci	Miloš Makovec	Stanislav Fišer, Vladimír Hlavatý	Drama, war	Entered into the 1957 Cannes Film Festival
1957
Florenc 13:30	Josef Mach	Josef Bek, Jiřina Bohdalová	Comedy	
Jurášek	Miroslav Cikán	Karel Hašler, Vladimir Gulyayev	Drama	
Páté kolo u vozu	Bořivoj Zeman	Zdeňka Baldová, Vlasta Fabianová	Comedy	
Posledná bosorka	Vladimír Bahna	Olga Zöllnerová, Mikulás Huba	Drama	
Škola otců	Ladislav Helge	Karel Höger, Blažena Holišová	Drama	
Štyridsaťštyri	Paľo Bielik	Juraj Sarvaš, Dušan Blaškovič	Drama, war	
Zářijové noci	Vojtěch Jasný	Václav Lohniský, Ladislav Pešek	Drama	
Vlčí jáma	Jiří Weiss	Jiřina Šejbalová, Jana Brejchová	Drama	After the novel Vlčí jáma by Jarmila Glazarová
Zemianska česť	Vladimír Bahna	Eva Krivánková, Andrej Bagar	Comedy, drama	
1958
Dnes naposled	Martin Frič	Zdeněk Štěpánek, Vladimír Ráž	Drama	
Hořká láska	Josef Mach	Jan Sedliský, Eva Kubešová	Drama, romance	
Poslušně hlásím	Karel Steklý	Rudolf Hrušínský, Svatopluk Beneš	Comedy, war	After the novel The Good Soldier Švejk by Jaroslav Hašek; follow-up to Dobrý voják Švejk from 1956
Povodeň	Martin Frič	Zdeněk Štěpánek, Otomar Krejča	Drama	
Szent Péter esernyője (Hungarian title)	Frigyes Bán, Vladislav Pavlovič	Sándor Pécsi, Mari Törőcsik	Comedy, drama	After the novel St. Peter's Umbrella by Kálmán Mikszáth; Czechoslovak-Hungarian co-production
Touha	Vojtěch Jasný	Jan Jakeš, Václav Babka	Drama	Entered into the 1959 Cannes Film Festival
Vynález zkázy	Karel Zeman	Lubor Tokoš, Arnošt Navrátil	Adventure, Science fiction	After several works of Jules Verne; awarded several international prizes, such as the Grand Prix at the Festival Mondial du Film during Expo 58
Žižkovská romance	Zbyněk Brynych	Hanuš Bor, Jana Brejchová	Romance	Entered into the 1958 Cannes Film Festival
1959
Kam čert nemůže	Zdeněk Podskalský	Miroslav Horníček, Jana Hlaváčová	Comedy	Entered into the 1960 Cannes Film Festival
Kapitán Dabač	Paľo Bielik	Ladislav Chudík, Elo Romančík	Drama, war	
Král Šumavy	Karel Kachyňa	Radovan Lukavský, Jiří Vala	Crime, drama	
Princezna se zlatou hvězdou	Martin Frič	Marie Kyselková, Stanislav Neumann	Family, fantasy	
Sen noci svatojánské	Jiří Trnka		Animation	After the play A Midsummer Night's Dream by William Shakespeare; entered into the 1959 Cannes Film Festival
Útek ze stínu	Jiří Sequens	František Smolík, Ludmila Vendlová	Animation	Awarded a Golden Medal at the 1959 Moscow International Film Festival

== 1960s ==
Title	Director	Cast	Genre	Notes
1960
Bílá spona	Martin Frič	Čestmír Řanda, Jarmila Smejkalová	Crime	
Dařbuján a Pandrhola	Martin Frič	Jiří Sovák, Rudolf Hrušínský	Fantasy	
Holubice	František Vláčil	Kateřina Irmanovová, Karel Smyczek	Drama	Entered into the 1960 Venice International Film Festival
Jerguš Lapin	Jozef Medveď	Jozef Kroner, Hana Meličková	Drama	
Konec cesty	Miroslav Cikán	Michael Kostič, Alena Vránová	Crime	
Práče	Karel Kachyňa	Martin Růžek, Vladimír Hlavatý	Family, war	
Přežil jsem svou smrt	Vojtěch Jasný	František Peterka, Jiří Sovák	Drama, war	
Romeo, Julie a tma	Jiří Weiss	Ivan Mistrík, Daniela Smutná	Drama	
Vyšší princip	Jiří Krejčík	František Smolík, Jana Brejchová	Drama	After the book Němá barikáda by Jan Drda; banned in West Germany at the time of its release
1961
Baron Prášil	Karel Zeman	Miloš Kopecký, Jana Brejchová	Adventure, romance	
Ďáblova past	František Vláčil	Vítězslav Vejražka, Miroslav Macháček	Drama	
Každá koruna dobrá	Zbyněk Brynych	Miloš Kopecký, Miroslav Horníček	Comedy	
Kde alibi nestačí	Vladimír Čech	Karel Höger, Josef Bek	Crime	
Kočičí škola	Břetislav Pojar		Animation, short	
Kohout plaší smrt	Vladimír Čech	Milka Balek-Brodská, Josef Bek	Drama	
Muž z prvního století	Břetislav Pojar	Miloš Kopecký, Radovan Lukavský	Comedy, science fiction	Entered into the 1962 Cannes Film Festival
Pouta	Karel Kachyňa	Radovan Lukavský, Blanka Bohdanová	Drama, science fiction	Entered into the 1962 Moscow International Film Festival
Trápení	Karel Kachyňa	Jorga Kotrbová, Zora Jiráková	Drama	
Zbabělec	Jiří Weiss	Ladislav Chudík, Dana Smutná	Drama	
1962
Boxer a smrt'	Peter Solan	Štefan Kvietik, Manfred Krug	Drama	
Klaun Ferdinand a raketa	Jindřich Polák	Jiří Vršťala, Hanuš Bor	Family, science fiction	
Transport z ráje	Zbyněk Brynych	Zdeněk Štěpánek, Ilja Prachař	Drama	Awarded a Golden Leopard at the 1963 Locarno International Film Festival
1963
The Cassandra Cat	Vojtěch Jasný	Jan Werich, Emília Vášáryová, Vlastimil Brodský		
Something Different	Věra Chytilová			
1964
Atentát	Jiří Sequens	Radoslav Brzobohatý, Luděk Munzar, Ladislav Mrkvička, Rudolf Jelínek	War	
The Cry	Jaromil Jireš	Eva Límanová, Josef Abrhám	Drama	
Diamonds of the Night	Jan Němec	Ladislav Jansky, Antonin Kumbera	War drama	
A Fresh Start	Miroslav Hubáček	Slávo Záhradnik, Milena Dvorská, Rudolf Jelínek, Dusan Lenci	Drama	
A Jester's Tale	Karel Zeman	Petr Kostka, Miloslav Holub, Emília Vášáryová	Black comedy	
1965
First Day of My Son	Ladislav Helge			
Fotbal	Jaroslav Mach			
Kissing-Time Ninety	Antonín Moskalyk			
Loves of a Blonde	Miloš Forman	Hana Brejchová, Vladimír Pucholt, Vladimír Menšík		Released on DVD by The Criterion Collection
The Shop on Main Street	Ján Kadar and Elmar Klos	Ida Kamińska, Jozef Kroner, František Zvarík		Released on DVD by The Criterion Collection
1966
Closely Watched Trains	Jiří Menzel	Václav Neckář, Vlastimil Brodský, Jitka Bendová	Coming-of-age	Released on DVD by The Criterion Collection
Daisies	Věra Chytilová	Jitka Cerhová, Ivana Karbanová, Marie Češková, Jiřina Myšková	Comedy drama	Released on DVD through the Eclipse series of The Criterion Collection
Katia and the Crocodile	Věra Plívová-Šimková		Family	
Pearls of the Deep	Jiří Menzel, Jan Němec, Evald Schorm, Věra Chytilová, Jaromil Jireš	Pavla Marsálková, Milos Cirnácty, Josefa Pechlátová, Vera Mrázková, Dana Valtová		Anthology; released on DVD through the Eclipse series of The Criterion Collection
A Report on the Party and the Guests	Jan Němec	Ivan Vyskočil, Jan Klusák, Jiří Němec, Pavel Bošek	Political satire	Released on DVD through the Eclipse series of The Criterion Collection
1967
The Firemen's Ball	Miloš Forman			Released on DVD by The Criterion Collection
Marketa Lazarová	František Vláčil	Magda Vášáryová, Josef Kemr, Naďa Hejná, František Velecký	Historical	Released on Blu-ray by The Criterion Collection
Return of the Prodigal Son	Evald Schorm	Jan Kačer, Jana Brejchová, Dana Medřická, Milan Morávek	Drama	Released on DVD through the Eclipse series of The Criterion Collection
Romance for Bugle	Otakar Vávra	Zuzana Cigánová, Věra Crháková, Jaromír Hanzlík, Miriam Kantorková	Drama	
The Wishing Machine	Josef Pinkava			
1968
Capricious Summer	Jiří Menzel	Rudolf Hrušínský, Vlastimil Brodský, František Řehák, Míla Myslíková	Comedy	Released on DVD through the Eclipse series of The Criterion Collection
Spring Waters	Václav Krška	Vít Olmer, Alžbeta Štrkulová, Květa Fialová, Marie Glázrová	Drama, romance	After 1872 novel by Ivan Turgenev
1969
The Cremator	Juraj Herz	Rudolf Hrušínský, Vlasta Chramostová	Horror	
The Joke	Jaromil Jireš	Josef Somr, Jana Dítětová, Luděk Munzar, Jaroslava Obermaierová		Released on DVD through the Eclipse series of The Criterion Collection
Prague Nights			Horror	

== 1970s ==
Title	Director	Cast	Genre	Notes
1970
Adelheid	František Vláčil	Petr Čepek, Emma Černá	Drama	
Behold Homolka	Jaroslav Papoušek	Josef Šebánek, Marie Motlová, František Husák, Helena Růžičková, Petr Forman and Matěj Forman (sons of Miloš Forman)	Comedy film	
Fruit of Paradise	Věra Chytilová	Jitka Nováková, Karel Novák, Jan Schmid	Avant-garde drama	
Valerie and Her Week of Wonders	Jaromil Jireš	Jaroslava Schallerová, Helena Anyžová, Petr Kopriva, Jirí Prýmek	Horror drama, coming-of-age	Released on Blu-ray by The Criterion Collection
Witchhammer	Otakar Vávra	Elo Romančík, Vladimír Šmeral	Horror drama	
Eden and After			Horror	
Velká neznámá			Horror	
Die Weibchen	Zbyněk Brynych		Horror	
1971
Slaměný klobouk	Oldřich Lipský	Miloš Kopecký, Iva Janžurová, Vladimír Menšík	Comedy film	Based on Un chapeau de paille d'Italie by Eugène Labiche and Marc-Michel
1972
Morgiana	Juraj Herz	Iva Janžurová, Petr Čepek, Josef Abrhám	Gothic horror	
1973
Fantastic Planet	René Laloux	Jean Valmont, Jennifer Drake, Eric Baugin, Jean Topart	Science fiction	Animation; co-production with France; released on Blu-ray by The Criterion Collection
1974
Jáchyme, hod ho do stroje!	Oldřich Lipský	Luděk Sobota, Marta Vančurová, Věra Ferbasová, Zdeněk Svěrák	Comedy	
1975
1976
Odysseus and the Stars	Ludvík Ráža	Jaroslava Obermaierová, Alois Švehlík, Gustav Bubník		
1977
1978
The Sorcerer's Apprentice			Horror, Fantasy, Coming of age	
Adela Has Not Had Supper Yet			Black Comedy	
Beauty and the Beast	Juraj Herz	Zdena Studenková, Vlastimil Harapes, Václav Voska	Gothic horror, Dark Fantasy	
1979
Those Wonderful Movie Cranks	Jiří Menzel	Rudolf Hrušínský, Vladimír Menšík, Jiří Menzel, Vlasta Fabianová	Comedy	
The Ninth Heart	Juraj Herz	Ondřej Pavelka, Anna Maľová, Julie Jurištová	Dark Fantasy, Adventure	

== 1980s ==
Title	Director	Cast	Genre	Notes
1980
1981
Friday Is Not Sunday	Otakar Fuka			
Waiter, Scarper!	Ladislav Smoljak	Josef Abrhám, Libuše Šafránková	Comedy	
The Mysterious Castle in the Carpathians	Oldřich Lipský	Michal Dočolomanský, Rudolf Hrušínský	Comedy	
1982
Upír z Feratu	Juraj Herz	Jiří Menzel, Dagmar Veškrnová	Horror	
1983
Best Regards from the Earth	Oldřich Lipský	Milan Lasica, Július Satinský, Jiří Menzel, Naďa Konvalinková	Comedy, Science fiction	
1984
Slunce, seno, jahody	Zdeněk Troška		Comedy	
The Snowdrop Festival	Jiří Menzel	Rudolf Hrušínský, Josef Somr	Comedy	
1985
1986
1987
Discopříběh	Jaroslav Soukup	Rudolf Hrušínský III, Ladislav Potměšil	Musical	
Princess Jasnenka and the Flying Shoemaker	Zdeněk Troška	Michaela Kuklová, Jan Potměšil, Lubor Tokoš, Antonie Hegerlíková	Fantasy	
Wolf's Hole	Věra Chytilová	Miroslav Macháček, Tomás Palatý, Stepánka Cervenková, Jan Bidlas	Science fiction horror	
1988
Alice	Jan Švankmajer	Kristýna Kohoutová	Dark fantasy	
Mr. Blob in the Universe	Krzysztof Gradowski	Piotr Fronczewski	Science fiction	Co-production with Poland
1989

== See also ==
- Lists of Czech films
- List of Slovak films
