= Otakar Vávra filmography =

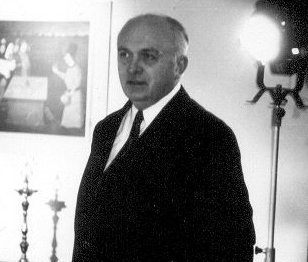
Otakar Vávra in 1980

Otakar Vávra (28 February 1911 – 15 September 2011) was a Czech filmmaker whose career spanned eight decades. In addition to his own career in filmmaking, he taught generations of directors at the Film and TV School of the Academy of Performing Arts in Prague. Notably, he was the teacher of several prominent members of the Czechoslovak New Wave.

== Filmography ==
Vávra is credited for the following films.

Year	English title	Czech title	Notes
1931		Světlo proniká tmou	
1934		Žijeme v Praze	
1935		Listopad	
1936	Three Men in the Snow	Tři muži ve sněhu	Writer only
1936	Camel Through the Eye of a Needle	Velbloud uchem jehly	
1937	Panenství	Panenství	
1937	History of Philosophy	Filosofská historie	
1938		Na 100%	
1938	The Merry Wives	Cech panen kutnohorských	
1939		Humoreska	
1939	The Magic House	Kouzelný dům	
1939		Dívka v modrém	
1940	May Fairy Tale	Pohádka máje	
1940		Podvod s Rubensem	
1940		Pacientka Dr. Hegla	
1940	The Masked Lover	Maskovaná milenka	
1941	Turbine	Turbina	
1942	I'll Be Right Over	Přijdu hned	
1942	Enchanted	Okouzlená	
1943	Happy Journey	Šťastnou cestu	
1945		Vlast vítá	
1945	Rozina, the Love Child	Rozina sebranec	
1946	The Adventurous Bachelor	Nezbedný bakalář	
1946		Cesta k barikádám	
1947	Premonition	Předtucha	
1948	Krakatit	Krakatit	
1949	Silent Barricade	Němá barikáda	
1949		Láska	
1953		Nástup	
1954	Jan Hus	Jan Hus	
1955	Jan Žižka	Jan Žižka	
1957	Against All	Proti všem	
1958		Občan Brych	
1959		První parta	
1960		Srpnová neděle	
1960		Policejní hodina	
1961	The Night Guest	Noční host	
1962		Horoucí srdce	
1965		Zlatá reneta	
1967	Romance for Bugle	Romance pro křídlovku	
1968	The Thirteenth Chamber	Třináctá komnata	
1969	Witchhammer	Kladivo na čarodějnice	
1973	Days of Betrayal	Dny zrady	
1974		Sokolovo	
1976		Osvobození Prahy	
1977		Příběh lásky a cti	
1980	Dark Sun	Temné slunce	
1983	Jan Amos Comenius	Putování Jana Ámose	
1984		Komediant	
1985		Veronika	
1985		Oldřich a Božena	
1989		Evropa tančila valčík	
2003		Moje Praha	
