= Hussite Revolutionary Trilogy =

1954–56 trilogy of films by Otakar Vávra

- Country: Czechoslovakia
- Language: Czech
- Budget: Total (3 films): 33 million Kčs

Hussite Revolutionary Trilogy is a trilogy of films by Otakar Vávra. It consists of Jan Hus, Jan Žižka and Against All. It was the most expensive Czechoslovak cinematic project. Budget was 33 million Czechoslovak crowns. Vávra stated that he was inspired by the works of František Palacký. He was also inspired by Alois Jirásek's works about Hussite Wars and their interpretation as a class struggle by Communist Minister of Culture Zdeněk Nejedlý.

Some actors appeared in more films of the trilogy but sometimes in different roles with most notable example being Zdeněk Štěpánek who played Jan Hus and Jan Žižka.

1947 film Warriors of Faith is sometimes considered "ancestor" of the trilogy. 2022 film Medieval is set 10 years prior events chronicled in the trilogy. Director of the film called it a prequel to Hussite Revolutionary Trilogy.

== Jan Hus ==
Jan Hus was released in 1954. It is the first part of the trilogy. It is set in period 1412–1415. It shows the last years of Hus' life.

== Jan Žižka ==
Jan Žižka was released in 1955. It shows period 1419–1420. The film concludes with Žižka's victory at Sudoměř.

== Against All ==
Trilogy was concluded by Against All in 1956. It is set after Battle of Sudoměř and ends with Battle of Vítkov Hill. Against All was the most expensive Czechoslovak film at the time.

== Recurring cast and characters ==
Character	Films		
Character	Jan Hus (1954)	Jan Žižka (1955)	Against All (1956)
Jan Žižka	Zdeněk Štěpánek	Zdeněk Štěpánek	Zdeněk Štěpánek
Sigismund, Holy Roman Emperor	Jan Pivec	Jan Pivec	Jan Pivec
Václav IV	Karel Höger	Karel Höger	
Sophia of Bavaria	Vlasta Matulová	Vlasta Matulová	
Čeněk of Wartenberg	Václav Voska	Václav Voska	
Jan of Chlum	Gustav Hilmar	Gustav Hilmar	
Václav z Dubé	Vítězslav Vejražka	Vítězslav Vejražka	Vítězslav Vejražka
Jan Želivský		František Horák;	František Horák;
Johanka	Marie Tomášová	Marie Tomášová	
Miserere, the jester	Ladislav Pešek	Ladislav Pešek	
