= Nastup (disambiguation) =

Nástup was a semimonthly Slovak periodical (1933–1940).

Nastup or Nástup, meaning "offensive" in several Slavic languages, may also refer to:

- Nástup (film), 1953 Czechoslovak film
- Nastup (Ukrainian periodical), a periodical of the Carpathian Sich (1938–1939) and the Melnykite faction of the OUN (1940–1944)
- NASTUP, or National Alliance of Freedom and Ukrainian patriotism "OFFENSIVE"
- Nástup, 1951 novel by Václav Řezáč
