= John of Chlum =

15th-century Bohemian nobleman

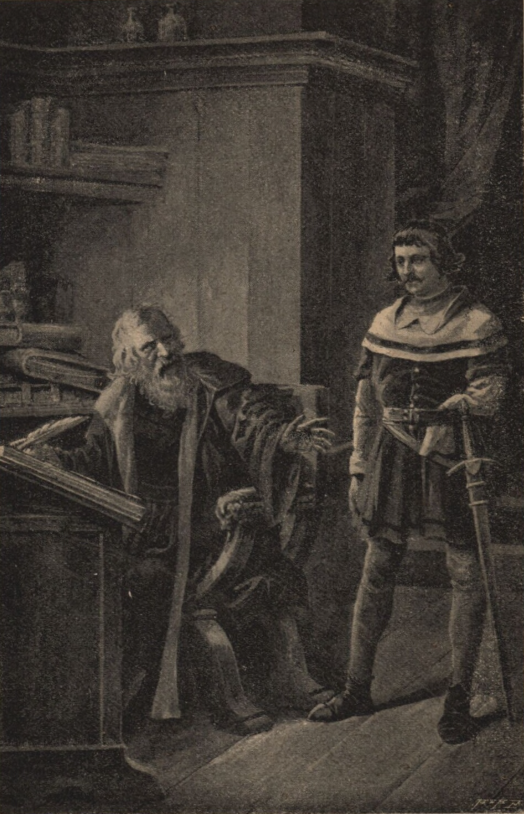
John of Chlum receiving a message about the journey of John Hus to Konstanz (J. B. Novák: Illustrované dějiny české, 1904)

John of Chlum (Czech: Jan Kepka z Chlumu; fl. 1381–1424) was a Bohemian nobleman and member of the entourage of Jan Hus.

== Biography ==
John was born to Ješek of Chlum, an impoverished noble in the service of the Berka of Dubá family. His date of birth is unknown; he is first mentioned in documents from 1381. John, as well as his brothers Peter and William, was likely born in the castle of Svojkov. He inherited Svojkov after the death of his father. Following his education, John entered the military service of Sigismund of Hungary. In 1414, Sigismund ordered John and Václav of Dubá to accompany Jan Hus to the Council of Constance. It was here that John and Jan developed a close friendship.

After the council, John entered the service of Sophia of Bavaria. In 1418, he was appointed as burgrave of Mělník. He was also given the lands of Pihel. John of Chlum likely died before 1425.

== In popular culture ==
John of Chlum was played by Gustav Hilmar in the 1954 movie Jan Hus and the 1955 follow-up Jan Žižka.
