= Transport from Paradise =

1962 Czechoslovak drama film

- Theatrical release poster
- Directed by: Zbyněk Brynych
- Written by: Zbyněk Brynych; Arnošt Lustig
- Based on: Night and Hope by Arnošt Lustig
- Starring: Zdeněk Štěpánek; Ilja Prachař
- Cinematography: Jan Čuřík
- Edited by: Miroslav Hájek
- Music by: Jiří Sternwald
- Production company: Filmové studio Barrandov
- Distributed by: Ústřední půjčovna filmů
- Release date: 5 March 1963
- Running time: 92 minutes
- Country: Czechoslovakia
- Language: Czech

Transport from Paradise (Czech: Transport z ráje) is a 1962 Czech drama film directed by Zbyněk Brynych. The film won the Golden Leopard at the Locarno International Film Festival.

== Cast ==
- Zdeněk Štěpánek as Council of Elders leader David Löwenbach
- Ilja Prachař as Obersturmführer SA Moritz Herz
- Ladislav Pešek as Prisoner Hynek Roubíček
- Jindřich Narenta as SS general Josef Knecht
- Vlastimil Brodský as Servant
- Čestmír Řanda as Ignatz Marmulstaub
- Jiří Vršťala as Driver Binde
- Jaroslav Raušer as Camp commander von Holler
- Walter Taub as Prisoner Joachim Spiegel
- Martin Gregor as Cabaretier Kurt Gerron
- Josef Abrhám as Datel
- Josef Vinklář as Vágus
- Jiřina Štěpničková as Prisoner Elisabeth Feinerová
- Juraj Herz as Mylord

== Release ==
It was released on DVD in the UK in March 2014.
