= Mist on the Moors =

1943 film

- Directed by: František Čáp
- Written by: František Čáp
- Based on: Mist on the Moors by Karel Klostermann
- Produced by: Karel Šilhánek
- Starring: Zdeněk Štěpánek; Marie Blažková
- Cinematography: Ferdinand Pečenka; Bruno Stephan; J. V. Staněk
- Edited by: Antonín Zelenka
- Music by: Jiří Srnka
- Production company: Lucernafilm
- Distributed by: Lucernafilm
- Release date: 14 January 1944
- Running time: 94 minutes
- Countries: Protectorate of Bohemia and Moravia
- Language: Czech

Mist on the Moors (Czech: Mlhy na Blatech) is a 1943 Czech drama film directed by František Čáp based on a novel by Karel Klostermann.

== Cast ==
- Zdeněk Štěpánek as Farmer Josef Potužák
- Marie Blažková as Potužák's wife
- Vladimír Salač as Václav, their son
- Jarmila Smejkalová as Apolenka, their daughter
- Terezie Brzková as Old woman
- Rudolf Hrušínský as Farmhand Vojta
- Jaroslav Zrotal as Gamekeeper Radonický
- Jaroslav Průcha as Farmer Jakub Krušný

== Release ==
In 2020 the movie was officially released online on YouTube by Czech Film Archive.
