= The Merry Wives (1938 film) =

1938 film

- Film poster
- Directed by: Otakar Vávra
- Written by: Zdeněk Štěpánek; Otakar Vávra
- Based on: Paní mincmistrová and Zvíkovský rarášek by Ladislav Stroupežnický
- Starring: Zdeněk Štěpánek; Ladislav Pešek; Václav Vydra
- Cinematography: Jan Roth
- Edited by: Antonín Zelenka
- Production company: Lucernafilm
- Distributed by: Lucernafilm
- Release date: 16 September 1938
- Running time: 96 minutes
- Country: Czechoslovakia
- Language: Czech

The Merry Wives (Czech: Cech panen kutnohorských) is a 1938 Czechoslovak historical comedy film directed by Otakar Vávra.

== Cast ==
- Zdeněk Štěpánek as Mikuláš Dačický of Heslov
- Ladislav Pešek as Očko
- Václav Vydra as Vilém of Vřesovice
- František Smolík as Alderman Tříska
- Jiřina Šejbalová as Žofie, Tříska's wife
- Theodor Pištěk as Vogt Vodňanský
- Antonie Nedošinská as Vodňanský's wife
- František Kreuzmann as Master Felix of Hasenburg
- Gustav Hilmar as Tailor Mládek
- Hana Vítová as Alžběta
- Adina Mandlová as Rozina
