= The Adventurous Bachelor =

1946 film directed by Otakar Vávra

- Directed by: Otakar Vávra
- Written by: Zdeněk Štěpánek; Otakar Vávra; Zikmund Winter
- Starring: Zdeněk Štěpánek
- Cinematography: Jan Roth
- Release date: 6 September 1946
- Running time: 96 minutes
- Country: Czechoslovakia
- Language: Czech

The Adventurous Bachelor (Czech: Nezbedný bakalář) is a 1946 Czech comedy film directed by Otakar Vávra. It was entered into the 1946 Cannes Film Festival.

== Cast ==
- Zdeněk Štěpánek – Jan, bakalář
- Vlasta Matulová – Anna, hostinská U Strípku
- Otomar Korbelář – Mikuláš, řezník
- František Smolík – Smardoch, konsel
- Jaroslav Marvan – Písecký, primas města Rakovníka
- František Kreuzmann – Zlutický, inspektor a městský písař
- Jaromíra Pacová – Markyta, Zlutický's Wife (as Míla Pacová)
- Saša Rašilov – Hruška, pekař a konsel
- František Roland – Slach, konsel
- Jaroslav Vojta – Matěj, vysloužilec
- Antonín Šolc – Ondřej Kralovic, kantor
- Josef Gruss – Zachariáš, sukcentor
- Zdeňka Baldová – Slachova žena
- Milada Smolíková – Hrušková, mestka
- Gustav Hilmar – Simon Cerasýn, děkan
