= Bedřich Feuerstein =

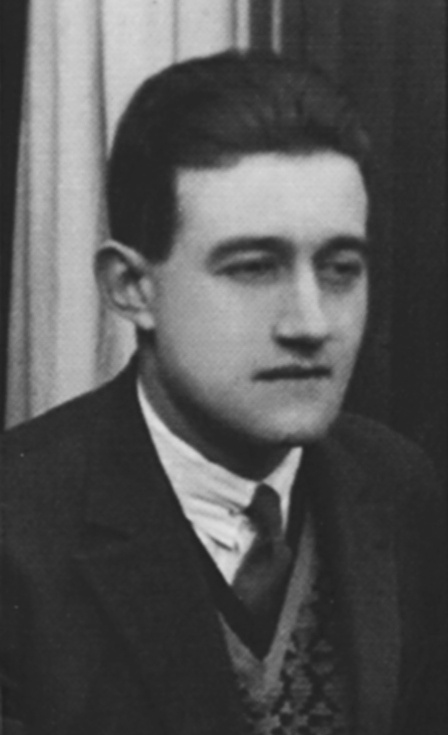
Feuerstein in 1930

Bedřich Feuerstein (15 January 1892 – 10 May 1936) was a Czech architect, painter and essayist.

Feuerstein was born in Dobrovice and studied at the Czech Technical University under professor Jože Plečnik. Between 1924 and 1926, he worked with Auguste Perret in Paris, and between 1929 and 1931 in Tokyo, Japan, with Antonín Raymond. His work was influenced by purism and by Frank Lloyd Wright.

After returning from Japan, Feuerstein suffered from nervous illness. His worsening condition and his financial problems led him to commit suicide in 1936, in Prague.

Important buildings:

- Military Geographical Institute (Vojenský zeměpisný ústav) in Prague
- crematorium in Nymburk
- hospital in Tokyo, shopping centre in Yokohama
