= Svojkov =

- Municipality
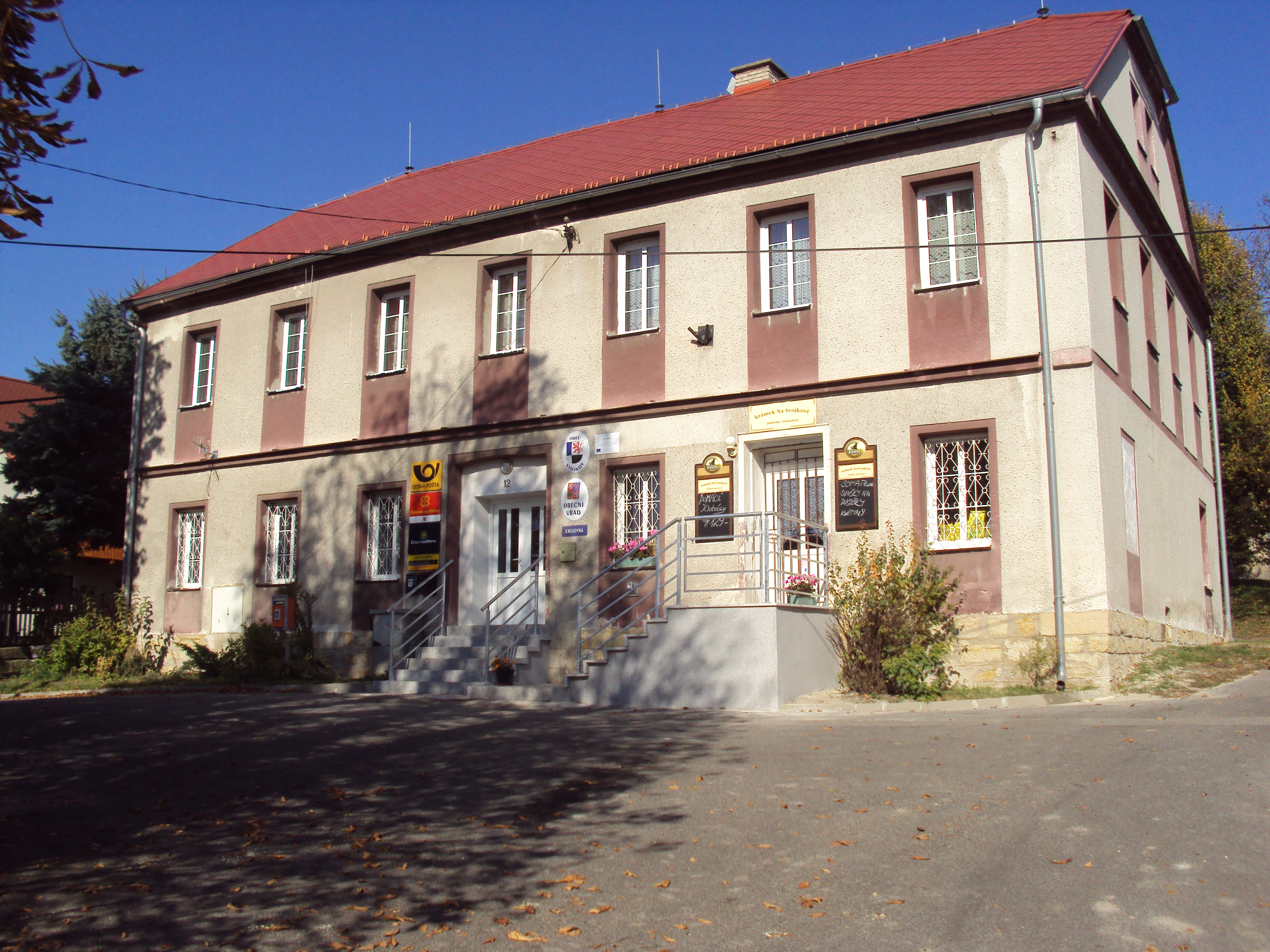
- Municipal office

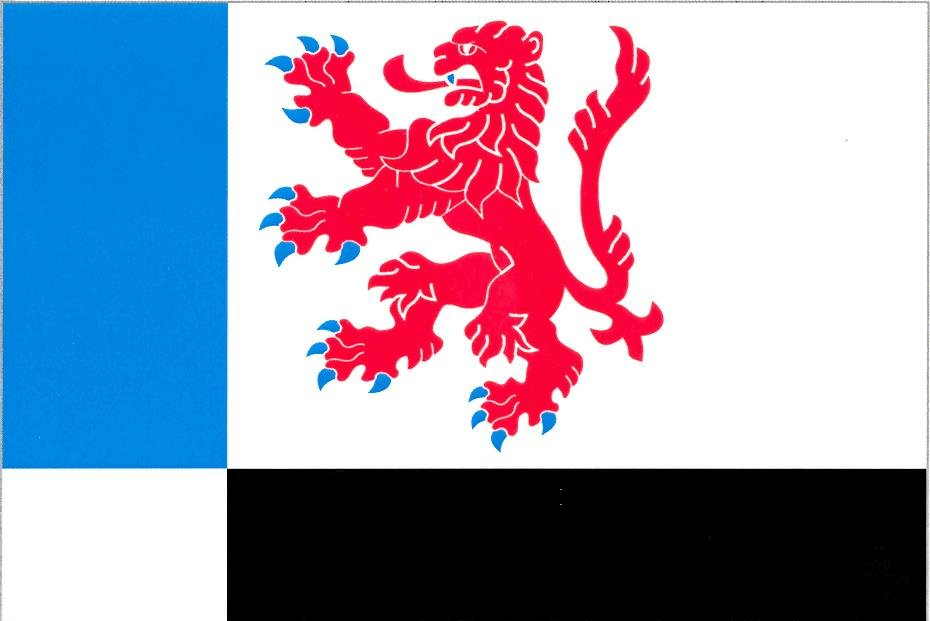
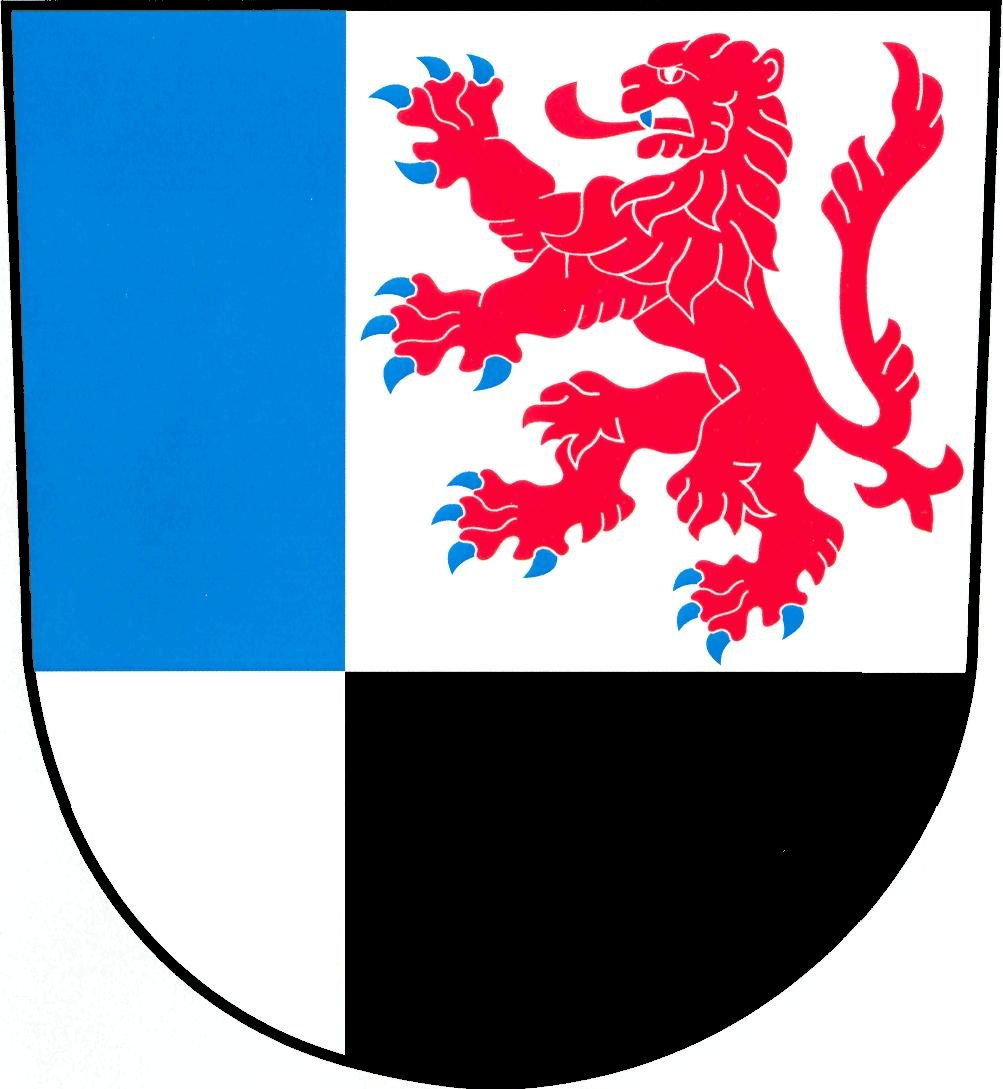
- Flag Coat of arms

- Location in the Czech Republic
- Coordinates: 50°43′10″N 14°35′57″E
- Country: Czech Republic
- Region: Liberec
- District: Česká Lípa
- First mentioned: 1370

Area
  - Total: 3.45 km^{2} (1.33 sq mi)
- Elevation: 362 m (1,188 ft)

Population (2026-01-01)
  - Total: 298
  - Density: 86.4/km^{2} (224/sq mi)
- Time zone: UTC+1 (CET)
  - Summer (DST): UTC+2 (CEST)
- Postal code: 471 53
- Website: www.obec-svojkov.cz

Svojkov is a municipality and village in Česká Lípa District in the Liberec Region of the Czech Republic. It has about 300 inhabitants.

== Demographics ==
Historical population
Year	Pop.	±%
1869	650	—
1880	626	−3.7%
1890	543	−13.3%
1900	501	−7.7%
1910	458	−8.6%
1921	401	−12.4%
1930	435	+8.5%
1950	245	−43.7%
1961	189	−22.9%
1970	125	−33.9%
1980	112	−10.4%
1991	91	−18.8%
2001	101	+11.0%
2011	187	+85.1%
2021	259	+38.5%
Source: Censuses

== Notable people ==
- John of Chlum (before 1381 – before 1425), nobleman and friend of Jan Hus
