= Pacientka Dr. Hegla =

1940 film

- Directed by: Otakar Vávra
- Written by: Marie Pujmanová; Otakar Vávra
- Starring: Adina Mandlová
- Release date: 30 August 1940
- Running time: 86 minutes
- Country: Czechoslovakia
- Language: Czech

Pacientka Dr. Hegla is a 1940 Czechoslovak drama film directed by Otakar Vávra.

== Cast ==
- Adina Mandlová as Karla Janotová
- Otomar Korbelář as Dr. Jindrich Hegl
- Svetla Svozilová as Dr. Hegl's wife
- Zorka Janů as Dr. Hegl's daughter Ela
- Svatopluk Beneš as Dr. Jaroslav Kriz
- Jaroslav Průcha as Pharmacist Janota
- Zdeňka Baldová as Mrs. Janota
- Gustav Hilmar as Mr. Kriz
- Růžena Šlemrová as Mrs. Kriz
- Jana Ebertová as Milada Svarcová
