= Jan Kříženecký =

Czech cinema pioneer, film director, cinematographer and photographer

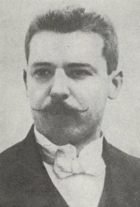
- Jan Kříženecký in his middle age
- Born: 20 March 1868; Prague, Bohemia, Austria-Hungary
- Died: 9 February 1921 (aged 52); Prague, Czechoslovakia
- Occupation: Filmmaker
- Years active: 1898–1912

Jan Kříženecký (20 March 1868 – 9 February 1921) was a Czech cinema pioneer, film director, cinematographer and photographer.

== Life ==
Worker at the Palacký Monument, 1912–1919

He studied architecture, but didn't finish his studies. His brother Rudolf became a famous architect. Since his youth Kříženecký was interested in photography. Since 1903 he worked as professional photographer documenting the soon to be demolished houses in the streets of Prague for Municipal Building Authority. In 1896 he first saw Lumière brothers' cinematograph in Prague. In 1898 he bought his own cinematograph together with his friend Josef František Pokorný. He started showing Lumières' as well as his own short documentary films at pavilion in Prague's Výstaviště during Architecture and Engineering Exhibition in June 1898. Kříženecký staged, directed, developed and showed his films by himself. Lumière brothers even bought some of his short movies. He was the only professional Czech filmmaker until 1908.

His filmmaking career ended in 1912. After that he worked as a projectionist for cinemas Louvre (1912–1915), Kino (1915–1916) and Světozor (1916–1921). He died forgotten in 1921 and none of the four Czech film magazines at that time reported his death.

His achievements were re-discovered by film historian Karel Smrž in 1930s. Many documateries about his life were made, including Jak to začalo (1968, dir. Květa Lehovcová), Jan Kříženecký (1968, dir. Bohumil Veselý), Praha Jana Kříženeckého (1981, dir. Miro Bernat), Jan Kříženecký (1983, dir. Vojtěch Trapl).

The character Kolenatý in Jiří Menzel's Those Wonderful Movie Cranks (1978) is based on Kříženecký.

Czech Film Archive released a DVD Short films of Jan Kříženecký in 2018.

== Selected filmography ==
=== Staged films ===
- Dostaveníčko ve mlýnici (1898)
- Smích a pláč (1898)
- Výstavní párkař a lepič plakátů (1898)
- Nejlepší číslo (1907)

=== Documentaries ===
- Purkyňovo náměstí na Královských Vinohradech (1898)
- Polední výstřel z děla na baště sv. Tomáše (1898)
- Svatojanská pouť v českoslovanské vesnici (1898)
- Alarm staroměstských hasičů (1898)
- Výjezd parní stříkačky k ohni (1898)
- Útok pražského dělostřelectva (1898)
- Poklepy na základní kámen pro pomník Františka Palackého (1898)
- Rychlovlak v Podbabí (1898)
- Defilování vojska o Božím těle na Královských Vinohradech (1898)
- Přenesení kolébky Františka Palackého z Hodslavic na výstaviště (1898)

== Bibliography ==
- Zdeněk Šťábla (1973). Český kinematograf Jana Kříženeckého. Prague: Čs. filmový ústav.
- Luboš Batošek (1985). Náš film. Kapitoly z dějin (1896–1945). Prague: Mladá fronta.
- Jaroslav Brož; Myrtil Frída (1959). Historie Československého filmu v obrazech 1898 – 1930. Prague: Orbis.
