= Muzikantská Liduška =

1940 film

- Directed by: Martin Frič
- Written by: Vítězslav Hálek; Karel Steklý
- Starring: Gustav Hilmar
- Cinematography: Jan Roth
- Edited by: Jan Kohout
- Release date: 7 June 1940
- Running time: 96 minutes
- Countries: Bohemia and Moravia
- Language: Czech

Muzikantská Liduška is a 1940 Czech drama film directed by Martin Frič.

== Cast ==
- Gustav Hilmar as Farmer Stanek
- Marie Blazková as Stanek's wife
- Jiřina Štěpničková as Liduska
- Hermína Vojtová as Landlady Krejzova
- Vilém Pfeiffer as Krejzova's son
- Ella Nollová as Frantina - herbewoman
- Karel Cerný as Jaros - clarinetist
- Gustav Nezval as Toník
- Jaroslav Marvan as Liska
- Eman Fiala as Chomelka
- Josef Príhoda as Trumpetist
- Alois Dvorský as Clarinetist
- Ludvík Veverka as Lahoza
- Vojta Merten as Homolka
- Ferenc Futurista as Soucek
