= Paradise Road (1936 film) =

1936 film

- Directed by: Martin Frič
- Written by: Hugo Haas; Otakar Vávra
- Produced by: Vladimír Kabelík
- Starring: Hugo Haas
- Cinematography: Otto Heller
- Edited by: Jan Kohout
- Release date: 1936
- Running time: 86 minutes
- Country: Czechoslovakia
- Language: Czech

Paradise Road (Czech: Ulička v ráji) is a 1936 Czech drama film directed by Martin Frič. Frič also directed a German-language version Das Gäßchen zum Paradies in the same year.

== Cast ==
- Hugo Haas as Tobiás
- Vladimír Jedlicka as Petrícek
- Zdeněk Štěpánek as Gustav
- Hana Vítová as Anicka
- Svetla Svozilová as Sona
- Jiří Dohnal as Emil
- Bedřich Vrbský as Broz
- Zita Kabátová as Brozová
- Theodor Pištěk
- Stanislav Neumann
- Jaroslav Průcha
