= Dobrovice =

- Town
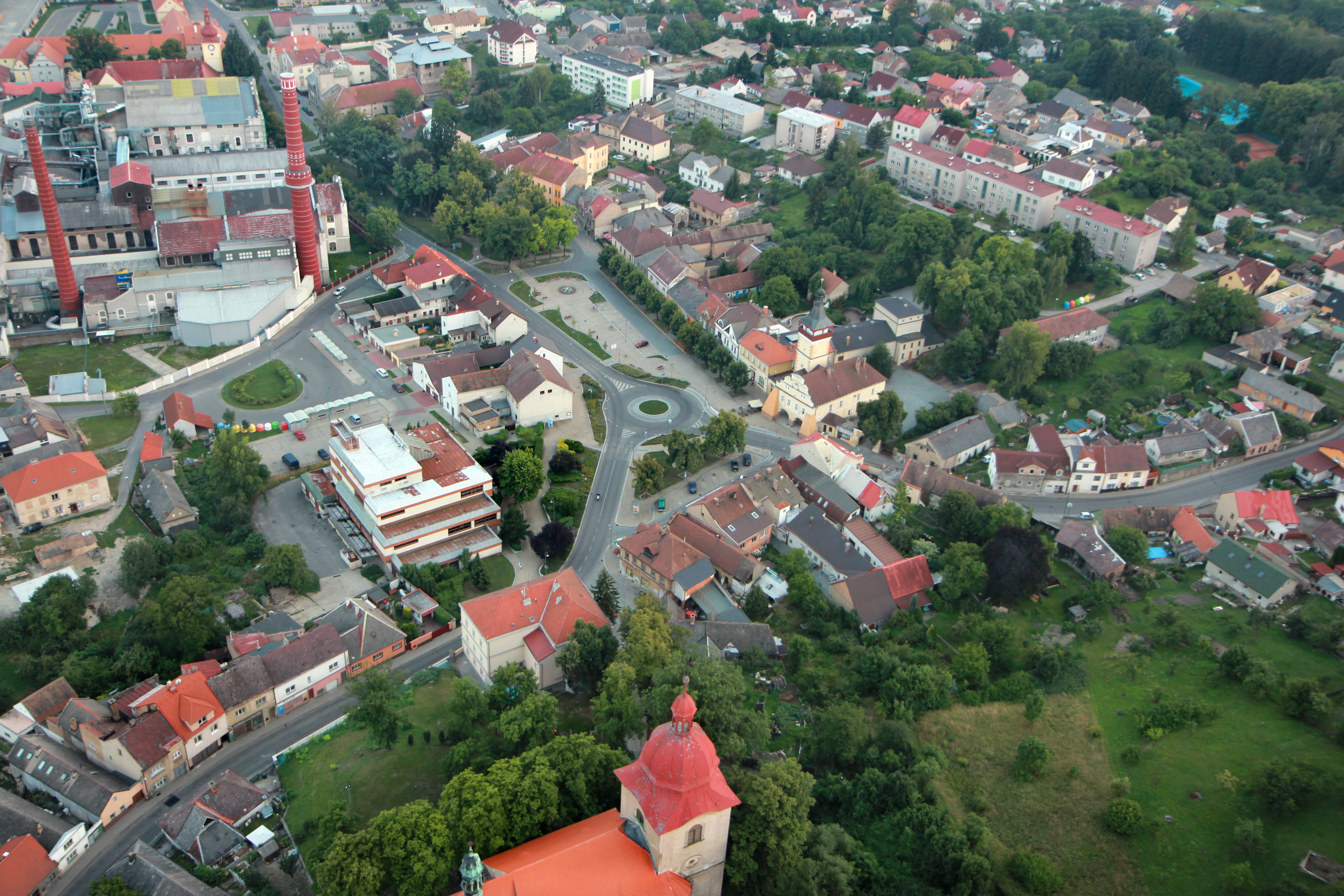
- Aerial view of the town centre

- Flag Coat of arms

- Location in the Czech Republic
- Coordinates: 50°21′59″N 14°57′53″E
- Country: Czech Republic
- Region: Central Bohemian
- District: Mladá Boleslav
- First mentioned: 1249

Government
  - Mayor: Tomáš Sedláček

Area
  - Total: 24.64 km^{2} (9.51 sq mi)
- Elevation: 247 m (810 ft)

Population (2026-01-01)
  - Total: 3,643
  - Density: 147.8/km^{2} (382.9/sq mi)
- Time zone: UTC+1 (CET)
  - Summer (DST): UTC+2 (CEST)
- Postal codes: 294 41, 294 42, 294 46
- Website: www.dobrovice.cz

Dobrovice (Czech pronunciation: [ˈdobrovɪtsɛ]) is a town in Mladá Boleslav District in the Central Bohemian Region of the Czech Republic. It has about 3,600 inhabitants. It is known for one of the oldest sugar factories in the world.

== Administrative division ==
Dobrovice consists of eight municipal parts (in brackets population according to the 2021 census):

- Dobrovice (1,962)
- Bojetice (247)
- Chloumek (129)
- Holé Vrchy (168)
- Libichov (193)
- Sýčina (267)
- Týnec (181)
- Úherce (347)

Chloumek, Libichov and Sýčina form an exclave of the municipal territory.

== Etymology ==
The oldest form of the name was Dobrovicěves. The name was derived from the personal name Dobrovít, meaning "Dobrovít's village".

== Geography ==
Dobrovice is located about 6 kilometres (4 mi) south of Mladá Boleslav and 43 km (27 mi) northeast of Prague. It lies on the border between the Jizera Table and Jičín Uplands. The highest point is the hill U doubku at 367 m (1,204 ft) above sea level.

== History ==
The first written mention of Dobrovice is from 1249. In 1541, the Lords of Chlum built a fortress in Dobrovice. In 1558, Dobrovice gained town rights and the fortress became a castle.

== Demographics ==
Historical population

| Year | Pop. | ±% |
|---|---|---|
| 1869 | 3,054 | — |
| 1880 | 3,607 | +18.1% |
| 1890 | 4,246 | +17.7% |
| 1900 | 4,461 | +5.1% |
| 1910 | 4,712 | +5.6% |

| Year | Pop. | ±% |
|---|---|---|
| 1921 | 4,673 | −0.8% |
| 1930 | 4,572 | −2.2% |
| 1950 | 3,521 | −23.0% |
| 1961 | 3,682 | +4.6% |
| 1970 | 3,222 | −12.5% |

| Year | Pop. | ±% |
|---|---|---|
| 1980 | 3,135 | −2.7% |
| 1991 | 2,936 | −6.3% |
| 2001 | 2,937 | +0.0% |
| 2011 | 3,265 | +11.2% |
| 2021 | 3,494 | +7.0% |

Source: Censuses

== Economy ==
There is a sugar factory in the town since 1831. It is the biggest and the oldest sugar factory in the Czech Republic, one of the oldest sugar factories in the world and the oldest one still working in its original premises. Since 2004, the sugar factory holds the name of its owner, French conglomerate Tereos.

== Transport ==
Dobrovice is located near the D10 motorway from Prague to Turnov, which briefly runs along the northwestern municipal border.

Dobrovice is located on the railway line Mladá Boleslav–Nymburk. However, the train station is situated outside the built-up area, between the fields southwest of the town proper.

== Sights ==
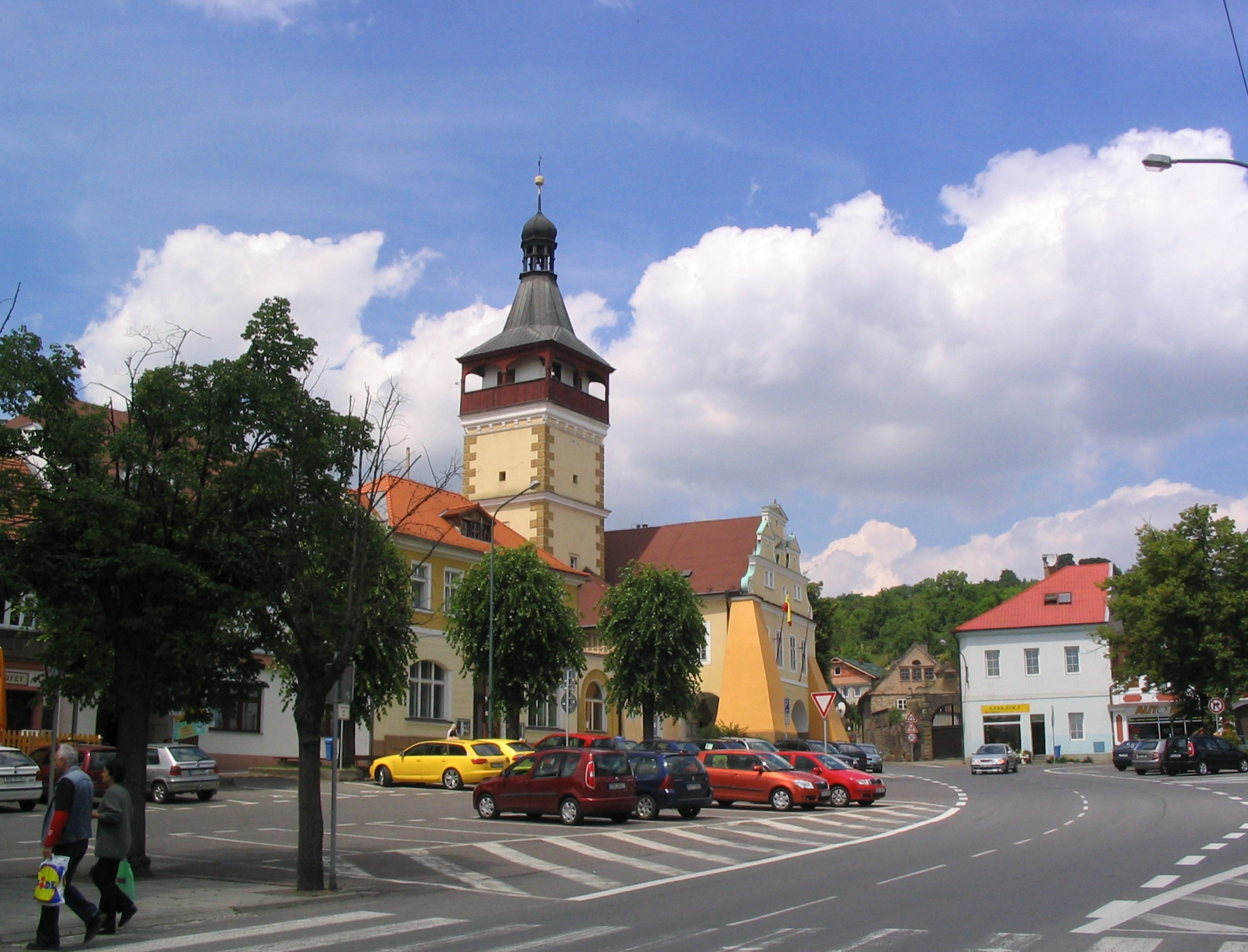
Town square with the town hall

The late Renaissance town hall was built in 1610 and reconstructed in 1674, after it was damaged by fire. Its tower is a landmark of the town square and today serves as a lookout tower for public.

The Church of Saint Bartholomew was built in the Renaissance-Gothic style in 1559–1571. It is a valuable sacral area with a number of quality sculptures. The Baroque rectory dates from 1709.

The sugar factory opened museums of sugar production, ethanol production and sugar beet processing in May 2010.

== Notable people ==
- Bedřich Feuerstein (1892–1936), architect, painter and essayist
- Jiří Adamíra (1926–1993), actor
- Marie Tomášová (born 1929), actress
