= Jan Amos Comenius (film) =

- Directed by: Otakar Vávra
- Written by: Otakar Vávra
- Starring: Ladislav Chudík
- Music by: Otmar Mácha
- Release date: 1983
- Running time: 150 minutes
- Country: Czechoslovakia
- Language: Czech

Jan Amos Comenius Czech: Putování Jana Amose, literally The Wanderings of Jan Amos) is a 1983 Czechoslovak historical film directed by Otakar Vávra. It tells the story of John Amos Comenius, a Czech philosopher, pedagogue and theologian who is considered the father of modern education.

== Cast ==
- Ladislav Chudík as Jan Amos Comenius
- Jana Březinová as Dorota
- Marta Vančurová as Jana Gaiusová
- Zuzana Cigánová as Magdaléna
- Jiří Adamíra as Dr. Tupl
