= První parta (film) =

1959 film

- Directed by: Otakar Vávra
- Written by: Karel Čapek; Otakar Vávra
- Starring: Eduard Cupák
- Release date: 1959
- Running time: 101 minutes
- Country: Czechoslovakia
- Language: Czech

První parta is a 1959 Czechoslovak drama film directed by Otakar Vávra.

== Cast ==
- Eduard Cupák as Stanislav Pulpán
- Gustáv Valach as Adam
- Jaroslav Vojta as Suchánek
- Rudolf Deyl as Falta
- Jaroslav Rozsíval as Martínek
- Milan Kindl as Matula
- Bohus Záhorský as Anders
- Marie Tomášová as Adamová
- Vladimír Ráž as Ing. Hansen
- Miriam Kantorková as Hansenová
- František Vnouček as Director of the mine
