= The Masked Lover =

1940 film

- Directed by: Otakar Vávra
- Written by: Honoré de Balzac; Otakar Vávra
- Starring: Lída Baarová
- Release date: 4 November 1940
- Running time: 83 minutes
- Countries: Bohemia and Moravia
- Language: Czech

The Masked Lover (Czech: Maskovaná milenka) is a 1940 Czech historical drama film directed by Otakar Vávra. It is based on a novel by Honoré de Balzac.

== Cast ==
- Lída Baarová as Lenka Rossetiová
- Ewald Balser
- Josef Belský as Judge
- Rudolf Deyl
- Gustav Nezval as Leon z Costy
- Ladislav Pešek as Leonuv sluha
- Jirí Steimar as Albert Angely
- Jiřina Steimarová as Emilie
