= Ladislav Helge =

Czech film director

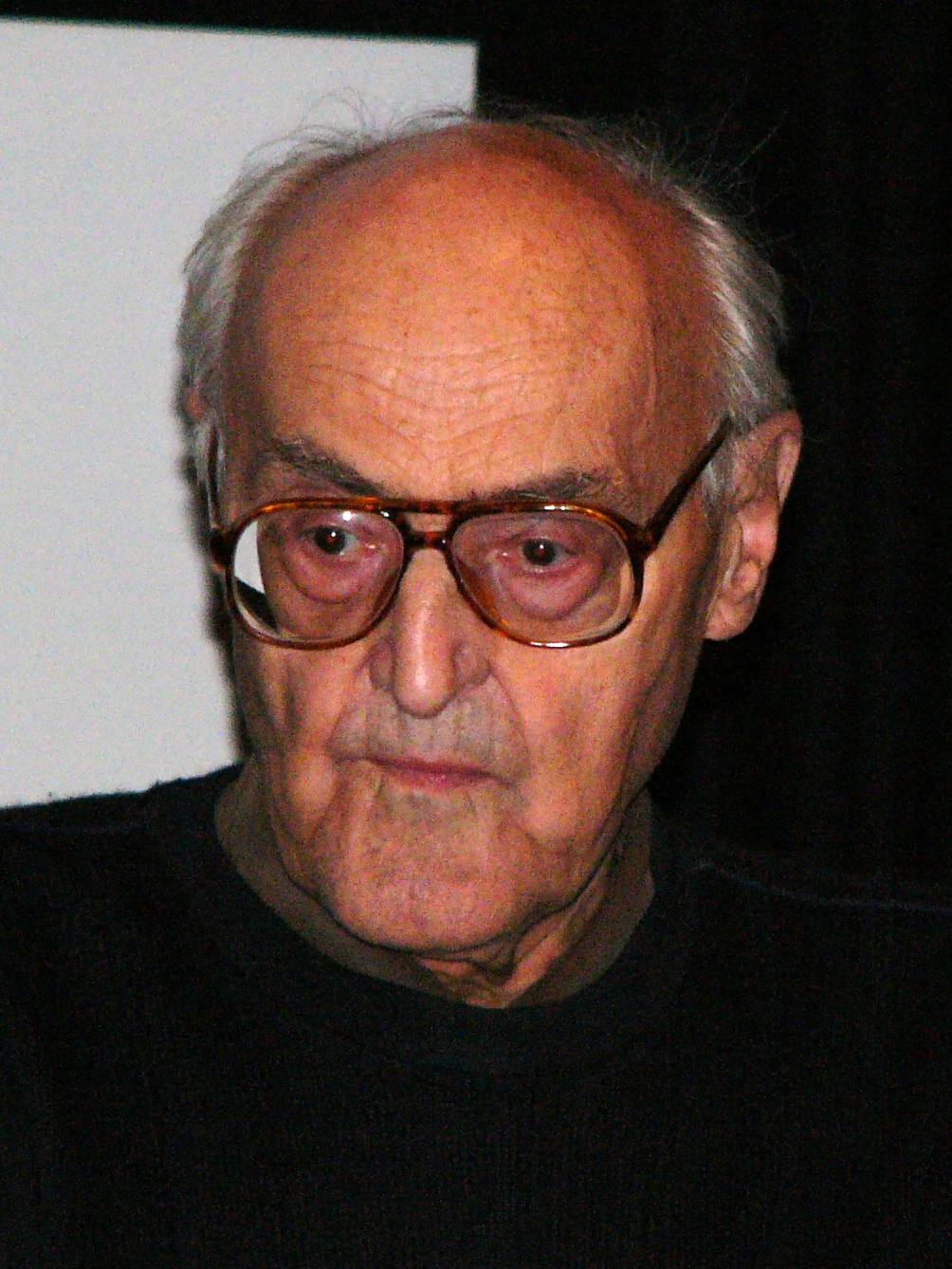
- Born: 21 August 1927; Prague, Czechoslovakia
- Died: 31 January 2016 (aged 88); Prague, Czech Republic
- Occupation(s): Film director, screenwriter

Ladislav Helge (21 August 1927 – 31 January 2016) was a Czech film director and screenwriter. He directed 7 films between 1957 and 1967, including Škola otců (1957). He also wrote screenplays for 5 films. He started as an assistant director for Jiří Krejčík in 1947 and directed his first movie in 1957. After 1968 he wasn't allowed to direct another film and worked at a post office. From 1977 to 1992 he worked as a screenwriter in Laterna magika. From the mid-1990s, he headed the department of film direction at Film and TV School of the Academy of Performing Arts in Prague.

== Filmography ==
- Škola otců (1957)
- Velká samota (1959)
- Jarní povětří (1961)
- Bílá oblaka (1962)
- Bez svatozáře (1963)
- První den mého syna (1964)
- Stud (1967)
