= Otomar Krejča =

Czech theatre director and actor (1921–2009)

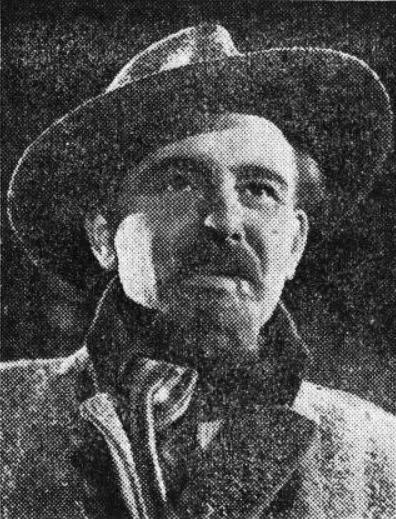
- Otomar Krejča in 1951
- Born: 23 November 1921; Skrýšov, Czechoslovakia
- Died: 6 November 2009 (aged 87); Prague, Czech Republic
- Occupations: Theatre director, dissident
- Spouse: Marie Tomášová

Otomar Krejča (23 November 1921 – 6 November 2009) was a Czech theatre director, actor and dissident. He directed 84 productions, of which more than 40 abroad, and became one of the most significant theatre directors in the history of Czech theatre.

== Biography ==
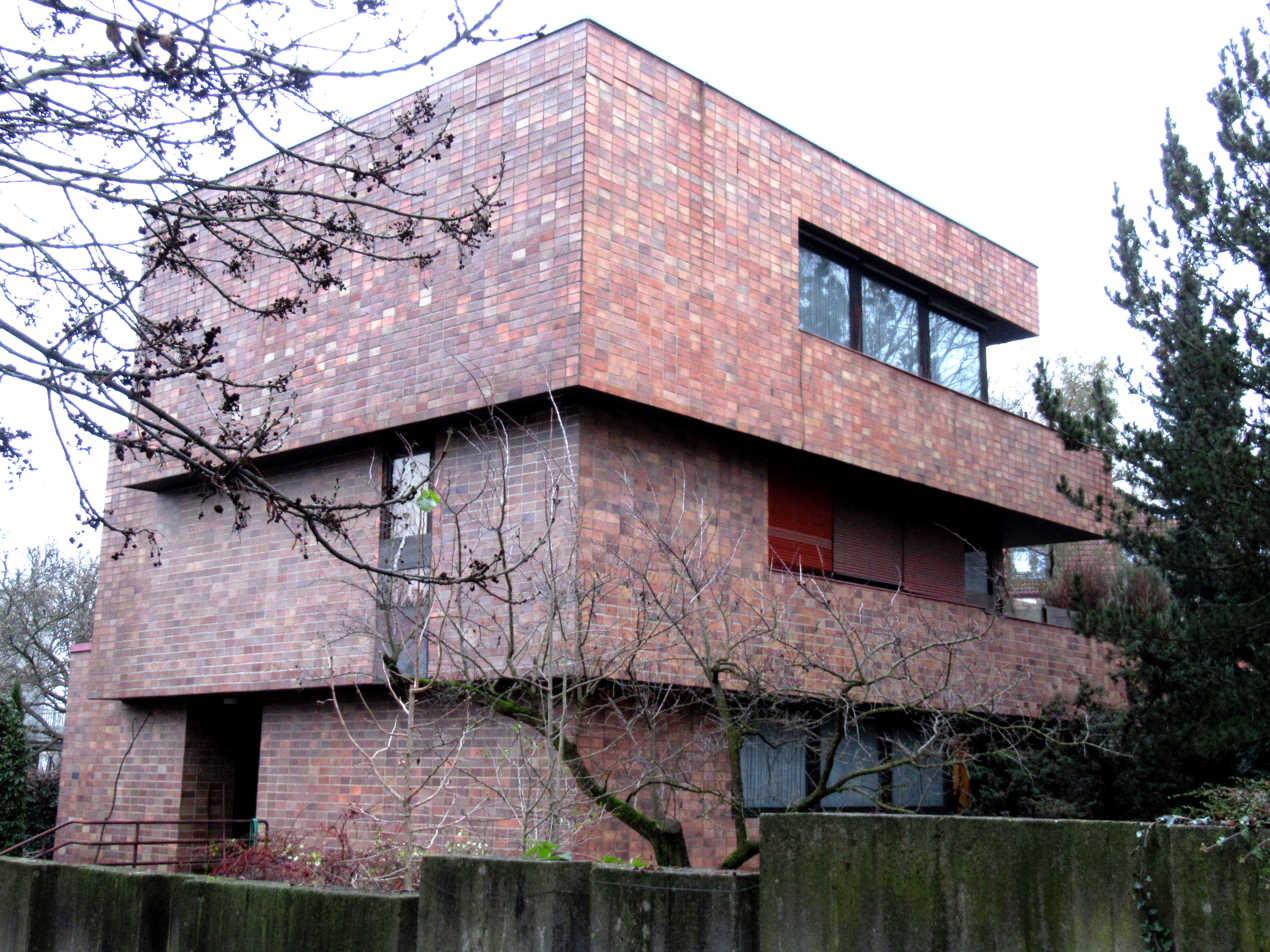
Otomar Krejča Villa in Štursova street in Prague-Bubeneč, where he lived from 1971

Krejča was born in Skrýšov (today part of Pelhřimov), Czechoslovakia, on 23 November 1921. After graduating from high school in 1939, he began acting in theatre. He worked for several theatre companies and theatres until 1945, including those in Jihlava and Kladno. After the end of World War II, Krejča returned to Kladno and began studying theatre studies at the Faculty of Arts of Charles University (1946–1949). From 1946, he also began appearing in film roles.

From 1951, Krejča was an actor in the National Theatre in Prague. In 1956, he became the director of the drama troupe, and then in 1961–1965, he was both an actor and a theatre director. He left the National Theatre in 1965 and co-founded the Za branou Theatre in Prague, in which he was artistic director (1965–1968) and then director (1968–1971). In the years 1965–1969, Krejča was also the chairman of the Union of Czechoslovak Theatre Artists.

Krejča and his work was banned following the Soviet invasion of Czechoslovakia. He signed the 2,000 words petition in 1968 and was expelled from the Communist Party of Czechoslovakia in 1970. The Za branou Theatre was closed by the communist regime in 1972. In 1973–1976, he was a theatre director in S. K. Neumann Theatre in Prague-Libeň. The new Czechoslovak government would not allow Krejča further to work in the country; from the mid-1970s, he was only allowed to work abroad. He went on to direct more than 40 theatre productions, including in Austria, Italy, Belgium, France, West Germany, Finland and Sweden. Krejča returned to work in his homeland following the fall of the Czechoslovak communist government in 1989. In 1996–1998, he once again worked as a theatre director in the National Theatre. During his career as a theatre director, he directed 84 productions and thus became one of the most significant directors in the history of Czech theatre.

Krejča was married twice. From his first marriage, he had the son Otomar Jr. (born 1947). His second wife was the actress Marie Tomášová, who became his partner during her engagement at the National Theatre in 1955–1965. However, they only got married in 1986.

Otomar Krejča died in Prague on 6 November 2009, at the age of 87. He is buried in Pelhřimov.

== Selected filmography ==
As an actor, Krejča appeared in:

- Old Ironside (1948)
- Dravci (1948)
- Distant Journey (1949)
- The Trap (1950)
- Jan Hus (1954)
- Tank Brigade (1955)
- The Flood (1958)
- Mezi námi zloději (1963)

== Honours ==
Krejča received numerous Czech and foreign awards for his work. Among the foreign awards were the Kainz Medal (Austria, 1969) the Ordre des Arts et des Lettres (France, 1978), the Pirandello Prize (Italy, 1978) and Stanislavsky Prize (Russia, 1999).

In 1998, he was awarded by the Czech Republic's Medal of Merit (First Class). In 2000, he was awarded by the Thalia Award – Special Award of the Kolegium (for historically significant figures of Czech theatre, other than actors).
