= The Flood (1958 film) =

1958 film

- Directed by: Martin Frič
- Written by: Martin Frič; Miroslav Hubáček; Jiří Mucha
- Starring: Zdeněk Štěpánek
- Cinematography: Václav Hanus
- Edited by: Jan Kohout
- Release date: 1958
- Running time: 76 minutes
- Country: Czechoslovakia
- Language: Czech

The Flood (Czech: Povodeň) is a 1958 Czech drama film directed by Martin Frič.

== Cast ==
- Zdeněk Štěpánek as Ryba
- Otomar Krejča as Josef
- Slávka Budínová as Josef's wife
- Gustav Heverle as Karel
- Ivanka Devátá as Zuzka
- Karel Fiala as Marko
- Jan Pivec as Doctor
- Václav Lohniský as Ing. Netousek
- Zdeněk Řehoř as Ing. zemánek
- František Vnouček as Placek
- František Holar as Kadlec
