= Fetters (film) =

1961 film

- Directed by: Karel Kachyňa
- Written by: Karel Kachyňa; Lubomír Mozný; Jan Procházka
- Starring: Radovan Lukavský
- Cinematography: Václav Hunka
- Release date: 22 September 1961
- Country: Czechoslovakia
- Language: Czech

Fetters (Czech: Pouta) is a 1961 Czech drama film directed by Karel Kachyňa. The film was entered into the 2nd Moscow International Film Festival.

== Cast ==
- Radovan Lukavský as Dr. Jirí Klimes
- Blanka Bohdanová as Sylva
- Jirina Svorcová as Magda Muzikárová
- Zdeněk Štěpánek as Klimes
- Jarmila Kurandová as Aunt
- Zdenek Kutil as Co-op chairman
- Milada Vitova as Vintrová
- Luděk Munzar as Dr. Nemecek
- Ilja Prachar as Dr. Martínek
- Petr Kostka as Elegant man
- Josef Koza as Truksa
- Milan Holubár as Snajdr
