= Eclipse (DVD brand) =

Brand for a line of DVD film series

The Eclipse logo

Eclipse is a brand for a line of DVD film series released by The Criterion Collection. It debuted on March 27, 2007. The brand was created to produce budget-priced, high-quality DVD editions of hard-to-find films. The DVDs are released in boxed sets that contain between two and seven films and focus on a specific director, film studio, genre, or theme. Typically, they are released monthly. In order to keep prices low, the films do not receive the same degree of remastering or any of the special features generally associated with Criterion Collection titles. When Criterion announced that all of their future releases would be in dual format (DVD + Blu-ray), they specifically said that Eclipse was meant to be available in a cheaper form and thus would continue to be on DVD only.

== History ==
Eclipse was conceived of as a possible subsidiary label for cult films.

In 2025, Criterion announced that the line would be relaunched for Blu-ray, with their first title being Abbas Kiarostami: Early Shorts and Features.

== Mission statement ==
Eclipse presents a selection of lost, forgotten, or overshadowed films in simple, affordable editions. Each series is a brief cinematheque retrospective for the adventurous home viewer.

— Peter Becker, president of The Criterion Collection

Peter Becker, in his blog On Five from The Criterion Collection Web site, explained, "We want [important, hard to find films] to be more readily available, and that’s why we’re creating Eclipse. Each month we’ll present a short series, usually three to five films, focusing on a particular director or theme. There will be no supplements and the master materials will be the best we can find, but they won’t be full Criterion restorations."

== Pricing ==
From Peter Becker's blog: "Retail pricing for each set will average under $15 per disc, and we are examining the logistics of making the sets available at an even more favorable rate on a subscriber or club basis. The goal here is to make these films available, to make sure that Criterion’s own work style doesn’t contribute to the continuing unavailability of these films." Because these are multiple disc box sets, the total suggested retail price depends on the set. The Documentaries of Louis Malle, for example, is six discs, and it has a suggested retail price of $79.99.
