= František Palacký Monument, Prague =

Sculpture in Prague, Czech Republic

František Palacký Monument
- Pomník Františka Palackého
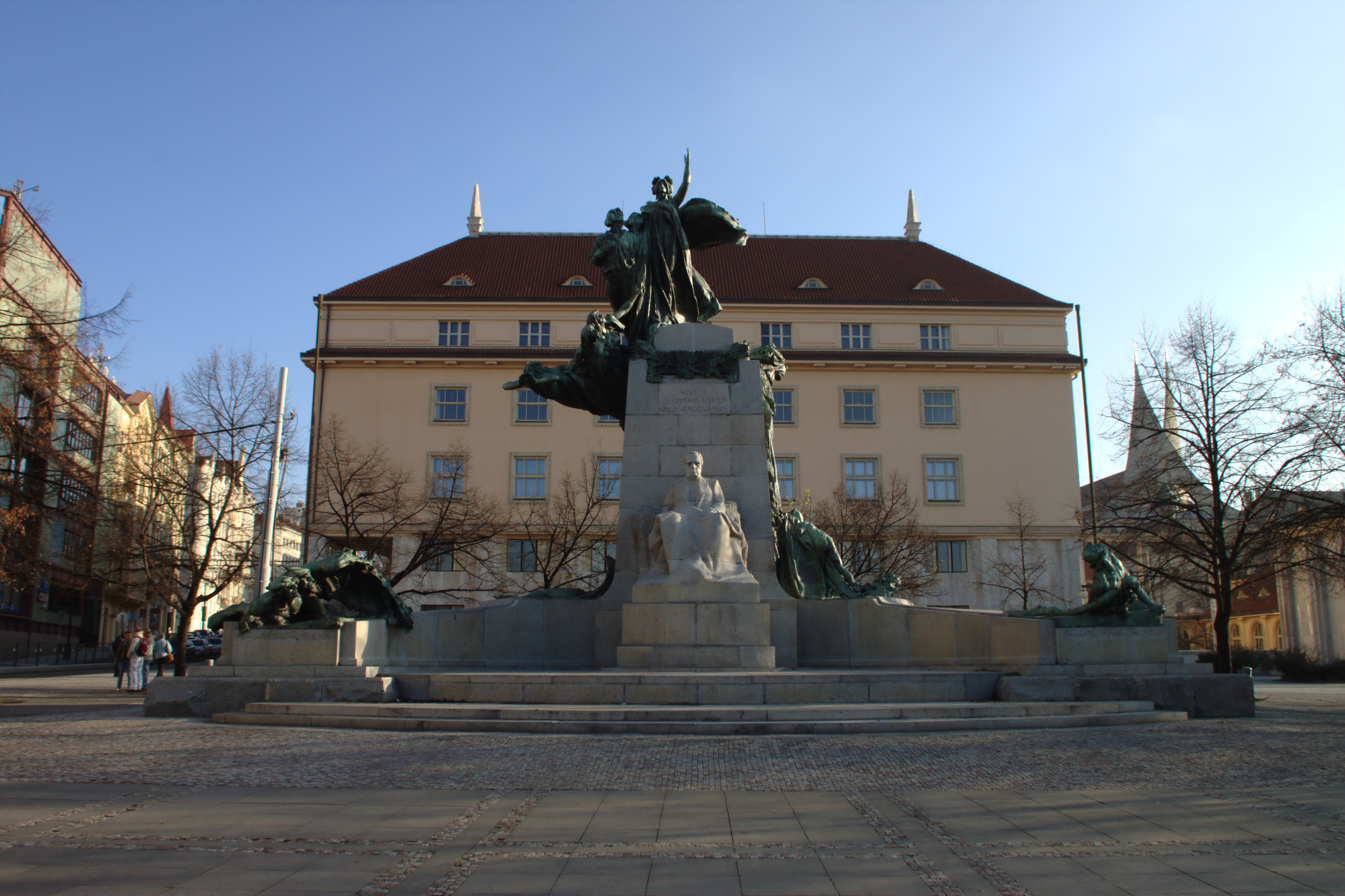
- The monument in 2012
- Interactive map of František Palacký Monument
- Coordinates: 50°4′22.86″N 14°24′53.41″E
- Designer: Stanislav Sucharda
- Dedicated to: František Palacký

The František Palacký Monument (Czech: Pomník Františka Palackého) is an outdoor monument commemorating František Palacký by Stanislav Sucharda, installed in New Town, Prague, Czech Republic.
