= The Secret of Blood =

1953 film

- Directed by: Martin Frič
- Written by: Vladimír Neff; Otakar Kirchner; Jan Werich; Martin Frič
- Starring: Vladimír Ráž
- Cinematography: Jan Stallich
- Edited by: Jan Kohout
- Music by: Dalibor C. Vačkář
- Production company: Studio uměleckého filmu
- Distributed by: Československý státní film
- Release date: 25 December 1953
- Running time: 101 minutes
- Country: Czechoslovakia
- Language: Czech

The Secret of Blood (Czech: Tajemství krve) is a 1953 Czechoslovak biographical drama film directed by Martin Frič about Czech doctor Jan Janský who discovered and classified the four different blood types. It competed at 14th Venice International Film Festival.

== Cast ==
- Vladimír Ráž as Dr. Jan Janský
- Zdeněk Štěpánek as Prof. Kuffner
- Jiřina Petrovická as Hedva
- Vlastimil Brodský as Dr. Kozdera
- Svatopluk Beneš as Dr. Regent
- Rudolf Hrušínský as Dr. Kurzweil
- Radovan Lukavský as Worker Kolčava
- Vlasta Chramostová as Kolčavová
- Rudolf Deyl as Batman Papík
- Josef Hlinomaz as Alois
- František Filipovský as Doctor at Lecture
- Josef Kemr as Angry patient
- Gustav Hilmar as Prof. Kyselka
