= Racek má zpoždění =

1950 film

Racek má zpoždění is a Czech comedy film that was released in 1950.
