= Jan Hus (1954 film) =

Czechoslovak film

- Directed by: Otakar Vávra
- Written by: Otakar Vávra; Milos Václav Kratochvíl
- Starring: Zdeněk Štěpánek; Karel Höger; Vlasta Matulová
- Music by: Jiři Srnka
- Release date: 1954
- Running time: 115 minutes
- Country: Czech Republic
- Language: Czech
- Budget: 13 million KČs

Jan Hus is a 1954 Czechoslovak film about Jan Hus, an early Christian reformer. It is the first part of the "Hussite Revolutionary Trilogy", one of the most famous works of Otakar Vávra, completed with Jan Žižka (1955) and Against All (1956).

== Plot ==
The opening part is set in 1412. It portrays the suffering of the poor working on the Týn Temple in Prague. It shows their struggles with rich townspeople and stingy church dignitaries collecting indulgences. Publicly criticizing the Catholic Church, Jan Hus opposes the sale of indulgences in his sermons in the Bethlehem Chapel. In addition to crowds of poor Praguers, his services are attended by Queen Žofia, who defends Hus before King Wenceslas. The ailing king, who is being pressured by the Pope and his brother Holy Roman Emperor Sigismund because of Hus's sermons, prefers to have fun rather than politics and worries.

The bull of Pope John XXIII. arrives in Prague. It is about further collection of indulgences. Spontaneous looting of churches and expulsion of Catholic priests occurs among the poor as a result. The city council has the soldiers intervene against the poor and puts three of their leaders, among whom is the stonemason Martin, in jail. Jan Hus intercedes for these three young men, who are condemned to death by the councilors, and even negotiates their release. However, the councilors do not honor this agreement and all three captives are executed. The Betrayed Hus marks them as the first martyrs of the coming storm.

Pope John XXIII. places curse on Hus afterwards. Hus therefore leaves Prague and goes to the countryside, where he continues to stir up the poor subjects against their lord. After further pressure from the Pope and the Emperor, when both even threatened to declare a crusade, Jan Hus finally acceded to their call and went to Constance, where a church council was convened. Hus, accompanied on the way by Jan from Chlum and Václav from Dubá, arrives in the city on the shores of Lake Constance without any problems. Upon arrival, however, he is immediately arrested under the pretext of a conversation with the cardinals, which arouses the indignation of the Czech people and nobility, who send a letter of complaint to King Sigismund. He guarantees the arrested master a hearing before the council.

The film culminates with Hus's trial before the Council of Constance. Not only Zikmund of Luxemburg and church dignitaries, but also Hus's former friend from the University of Prague, Štěpán Páleč, speak out against the preacher. Jan Hus refuses to renounce his teachings and is condemned to death at the stake by the council. Before being cremated, he says goodbye to his friends Jan z Chlumu and Václav z Dubé, exhorts those present not to listen to their bad ecclesiastical and secular authorities, and for the last time refuses the chance to appeal.

At the very end of the film, a crowd headed by Jan Žižka pledges to the legacy of Jan Hus and his teachings.

== Cast ==
- Zdeněk Štěpánek as Jan Hus / Jan Žižka
- Karel Höger as King Wenceslaus IV
- Vlasta Matulová as Queen Sophia
- Ladislav Pešek as Miserere the jester
- Gustav Hilmar as John of Chlum
- Vítězslav Vejražka as Václav of Dubá
- Eduard Kohout as Lefl of Lažany
- Bedřich Karen as Pierre Cardinal d'Ailli
- František Smolík as papal legate
- Otomar Krejča as Štěpán Palec
- Marie Tomášová as Johanka the servant
- Josef Kemr as Ješek the student
- Rudolf Hrušínský as burgomaster's son
