= Proti všem =

1893 novel by Alois Jirásek

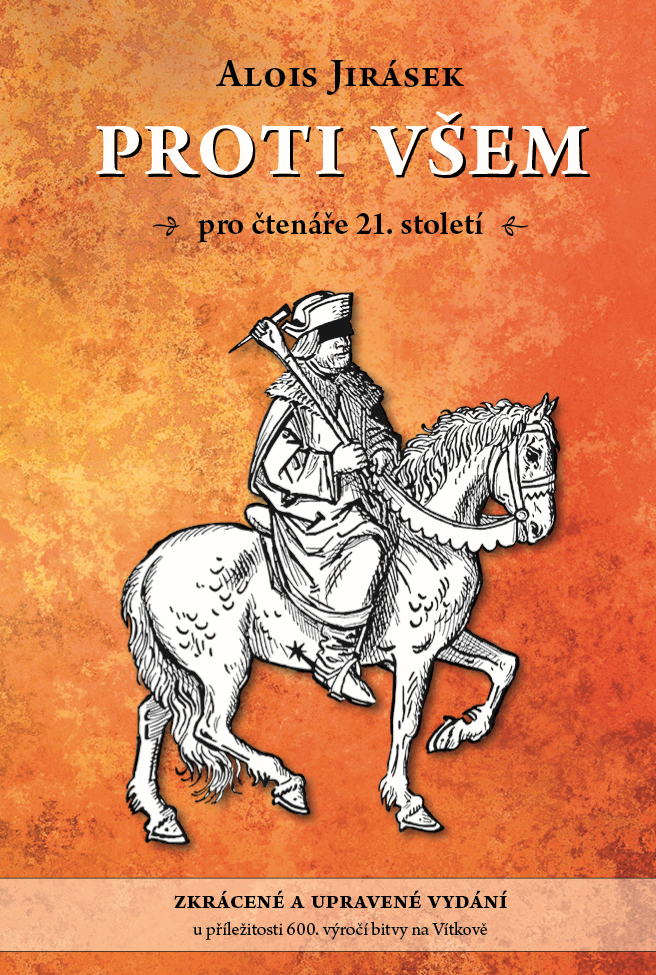
Cover of the Proti všem book (2020)

Proti všem is a Czech novel, written by Alois Jirásek. It was first published in 1893 and deals with the Hussite Wars. It was adapted into the film Against All in 1956.
