= Warriors of Faith =

- Directed by: Vladimír Borský
- Written by: Vladimír Borský, Alois Jirásek
- Starring: Otomar Korbelář
- Music by: Otakar Jeremiáš
- Release date: 1947
- Running time: 84 minutes (DC:112 minutes)
- Country: Czechoslovakia
- Language: Czech
- Budget: 4,130,000 KČs

Warriors of Faith (Czech: Jan Roháč z Dubé) is a 1947 Czech historical film by Vladimír Borský, based on a play by Alois Jirásek. It was the first Czech film in colour. It premiered in Prague on 28 March 1947, and the premiere was attended by Czechoslovak president Edvard Beneš.

== Cast ==
- Otomar Korbelář as Jan Roháč z Dubé
- Ladislav Boháč as Jan Rokycana
- Emil Bolek as Puškař Zelený
- Felix Le Breux as Výšek Račický
- Otto Čermák as Sigismund, Holy Roman Emperor
- Rudolf Deyl Jr. as Hrdinka
- Gustav Ekl as Orságh
- Lilli Hodáčová as Ludmila
- František Kulhánek as Hynek Ptáček z Pirkenštejna
- Antonín Kurš as Jakub Vlk
- Bohumil Machník as Ambrož z Hradce
- Viktor Nejedlý as Martin z Prostředka
- Viktor Očásek as Filibert z Coutances
- Karel Pavlík as Příbram
- Theodor Pištěk as Velvar
- Jiří Plachý as Oldřich z Rožmberka
- Vojta Plachý-Tůma as Palomar
- Jaroslav Vojta as Baba
- Hermína Vojtová as Taborite woman
- Aleš Podhorský as Menhart
- Karel Rint as Bedřich ze Strážnice

== Plot ==
The film is set after the Battle of Lipany, where the Radical Hussites are defeated. Only Jan Roháč refuses to surrender. He gathers his loyal followers at Sion Castle and organises resistance against King Sigismund. The castle is placed under siege and eventually defeated after a heavy battle. Jan Roháč is captured and hanged on Sigismund's orders. It angers the Czech people, who revolt against Sigismund, who is forced to run away.
