= Against All =

1956 film

- Film poster (Bulgarian release)
- Directed by: Otakar Vávra
- Written by: Alois Jirásek; Milos Václav Kratochvíl; Otakar Vávra
- Starring: Zdeněk Štěpánek
- Release date: 1956
- Running time: 109 minutes
- Country: Czechoslovakia
- Language: Czech
- Budget: 25 million KČs

Against All (Czech: Proti všem) is a 1956 Czechoslovak historical drama film directed by Otakar Vávra. It is based on the novel Proti všem by Alois Jirásek. The film's budget was 25 million KČs which made it the most expensive Czech film of the time. It is the third part of Vávra's cinematic Hussite Revolutionary Trilogy. The plot is set after Jan Žižka and concludes the entire trilogy. It takes place in 1420. The central motif of the film is the fight between the Hussites and the troops of the First anti-Hussite crusade led by the heir to the Bohemian throne, the Hungarian King and Holy Roman Emperor Sigismund of Luxemburg. It also follows the development of Tábor and the disputes between the moderate party of Jan Žižka and the radical Picarts of Petr Kániš.

== Cast ==
- Zdeněk Štěpánek as Jan Žižka z Trocnova
- Gustav Hilmar as Ctibor z Hvozdna
- Vlasta Matulová as Zdena
- Bedřich Karen as Provost
- Jan Pivec as Zikmund Lucemburský
- Miroslav Doležal as Jan Bydlinsky
- Václav Voska as Petr Kániš
- Jana Rybářová as Marta
- Petr Hanicinec as Ondrej z Hvozdna
- Stanislav Neumann as Sakristian
- Jaroslav Vojta as Simon
- Václav Špidla as Oldrich Rozmberk
- Rudolf Pellar as Vaclav Koranda the Elder
- František Horák as Jan Želivský
- Josef Kotapiš as Pippo Spano

== Plot ==
In the beginning, the Provost of the Louňovice monastery along with the local sacristan and young novice Marta are fleeing from a mob of looting Taborites. They find refuge in the fortress of the yeoman Ctibor of Hvozdno, who protects them from their pursuers. The trio escapes and manages to hide in Příběnice castle with the powerful lord Oldřich of Rožmberk. Most of the inhabitants of the village and also the Yeoman's daughter Zdena join the Táborites as they pass through Hvozdno. Villagers reach Tábor and are received there. Zdena is enchanted by one of the Tábor priests, Jan Bydlinský.

The provost of Louňovice persuades the Lord Rožmberk to side with King Sigismund of Luxembourg, who was just about to invade Bohemia at the head of a crusade. For the promised financial reward, young Rožmberk agrees to attack the weakened town of Tábor. With this news, the Provost goes to Kutná Hora, where Sigismund and his army are located planning to attacki Prague. Provost meets Ctibor of Hvozdno who heads to Tábor to see his daughter. Dispute begins to grow between the priests of Tábor who demand to defend themselves in the Tábor and the hejtman Žižka, who recommends coming to the aid of Prague threatened by Sigismund's army. A group of listeners begins to gather around fanatical priests Petr Kániš and Jan Bydlinský, including the Ctibor's daughter Zdena who listens to priests against her father's will.

The Provost of Louňovice arrives in Kutná Hora, where the Germans throw the Hussites into the empty shafts of the local silver mines. Here, the provost informs King Sigismund about the position of Oldřich of Rožmberk. A delegation from Prague arrives tonegotiate with Sigismun, desperately trying to beg for mercy from Sigismund. Sigismund declines to negotiate with the Hussite envoys and thus force them to ask for help from the rural Hussites and especially the South Bohemian camps. In Tábor Žižka's side prevails after hearing news from Prague and most of the local Hussites are getting ready to leave for the threatened Prague. The yeoman Ctibor and his nephew Ondřej also leave against their father's will. Zdena decides to stay in the city together with Bydlinský, Kániš and their people.

The lord of Rožmberk marches against the weakened Tábor with his army supported by the troops of the Austrian Duke Albrecht. In Rožmberk's army there is also novice Marta, the Provost and sacristan of Louňovice. The camp is besieged and barely resists the odds. Žižka sends cavalry from Prague to the aid of the besieged Tábor. With an unexpected attack, the Hussites manage to defeat the besiegers and save Tábor. AProvost and Sacristan of Louňovice are captured and executed by Hussites. Novice Marta and her maid are saved from death by young Ondřej of Hvozdno.

After the primary danger has been extinguished, there is a definitive split in Tábor. Radicals led by Kániš leave the city for the foothills of the conquered Příběnice castle. Zdena and Jan Bydlinský also leave together as they fall in love. In Příběnice, Kániš seduces his listeners, and these fanatics burn the Zeman's daughter Zdena and Kániš's son Bydlinský alive. Not even Ctibor can save his daughter.

In the finale of the entire film, Prague, where Hussites have already arrived, is preparing for an attack by the Crusader troops, who are besieging the capital from three sides. The only supply route to Prague is the path from Poříčská brána, which leads around Vítkov Hill. Žižka therefore fortifies this strategic point with very small group. Large crusader army attacks Vítkov Hill. Žižka's group defends it but is vastly outnumbered. Crusaders are eventually defeated when reinforcements from Prague arrive. King Sigismund is defeated and the crusade falls apart. The Hussites celebrate this great victory at the end of film.

== Production ==
The film was shot in 1956 in studios in Barrandov. Exteriors were shot in Radotín. Historians Jan Durdík and Eduard Wagner participated in the production as historical and military advisors. The music was conducted by Jiří Srnka and arranged by the Film Symphony Orchestra and Aus-Vít Nejedlý Choir conducted by František Belfín. Jiří Trnka also participated in the film as head of the costume section. Filming took place with the participation of units of the Czechoslovak army and clubs of Svazarm, which supplied horses for the filming, and the Institute of Military History. The budget of 25 million Czechoslovak crowns made the film Against All the most expensive film in the history of Czechoslovak film at the time.

== Reception ==
Like other parts of Vávra's Hussite trilogy the film is valued to this day for its monumentality, set, costumes and successful battle scenes. Nevertheless, this film is often criticized for its excessive use of the regime of the 1950s, its schematicity, its constructive enthusiasm and its distortion of history.
