= Marie Tomášová =

Czech actress (1929–2025)

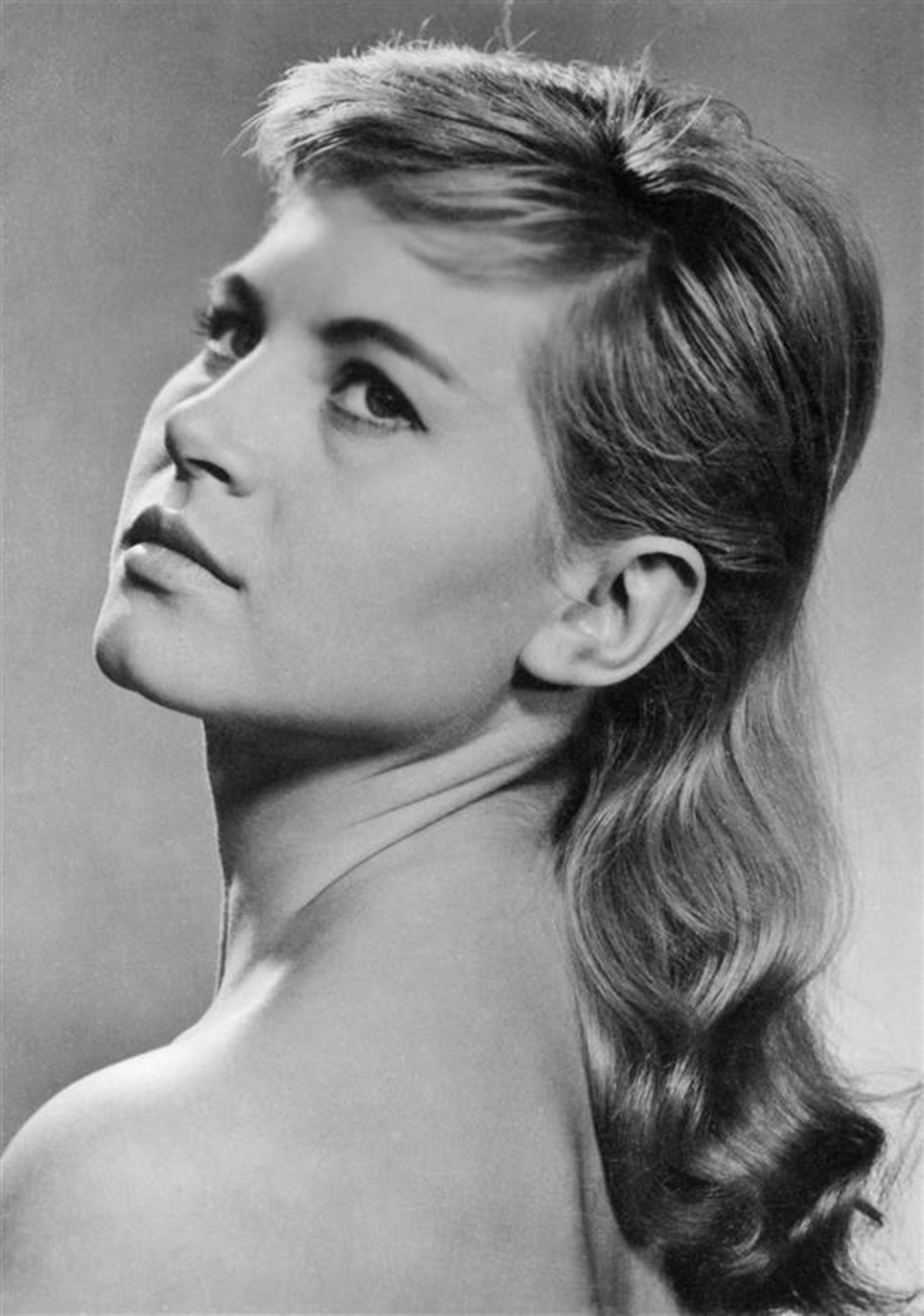
- Born: 18 April 1929; Dobrovice, Czechoslovakia
- Died: 25 May 2025 (aged 96); Mělník, Czech Republic
- Occupation: Actress
- Years active: 1952–2000
- Spouse: Otomar Krejča
- Awards: Thalia Award

Marie Tomášová (18 April 1929 – 25 May 2025) was a Czech film and stage actress. She acted at the National Theatre in Prague between 1955 and 1965. In 2008, she was awarded the Thalia Award for lifetime achievement in drama. She was married to theatre director Otomar Krejča until his death in 2009.

== Life and career ==
Marie Tomášová was born in Dobrovice on 18 April 1929. Although her family was poor, her parents had a love for culture and introduced her to literature and music. She attended high school only after World War II and then studied acting at Theatre Faculty of the Academy of Performing Arts in Prague (DAMU), from which she graduated in 1952. From 1952, she began appearing in films.

From 1955 to 1965, she acted at the National Theatre in Prague. She played over 40 roles there. Her frequent acting partner was Jan Tříska. During her time at the National Theatre, she met her lifetime partner, theatre director Otomar Krejča. In 1965, Krejča founded the Za branou Theatre. Tomášová and Tříska transferred there and became the main protagonists of the ensemble.

In 1968, Tomášová and her husband signed the 2,000 words petition against the authoritative communist regime in Czechoslovakia. The Za branou Theatre was closed for political reasons in 1972 and Tomášová was banned from performing (or rather, the theatres were forbidden to give her work). In the following years, she was employed in the Supraphon record label. Tomášová and Krejča married in 1986.

In 1990, she returned to the stage at the newly opened Za branou Theatre II. However, the long acting break affected the quality of her performances. Her theatre acting career definitely ended with the theatre's closure in 1994. She appeared in films only in a few small roles, the last time in 2000.

Tomášová died in Mělník on 25 May 2025, at the age of 96.

== Selected filmography ==
- Anna Proletářka (1952)
- Jan Hus (1954)
- The Strakonice Bagpiper (1955)
- Jan Žižka (1956)
- September Nights (1957)
- That Kind of Love (1959)
- První parta (1959)
- Čarodějky z předměstí (1990)

== Honours ==
Tomášová received many individual awards for her acting performances. In 1999, Tomášová was awarded Honorary Citizenship of the City of Mladá Boleslav, a city near her birthplace. In 2008, she was awarded the Thalia Award for lifetime achievement in drama.
