= Nástup (film) =

1953 film

- Directed by: Otakar Vávra
- Written by: Václav Rezác; Otakar Vávra
- Starring: Ladislav Chudík
- Release date: 1 May 1953
- Running time: 118 minutes
- Country: Czechoslovakia
- Language: Czech

Nástup is a 1953 Czechoslovak drama film directed by Otakar Vávra.

== Cast ==
- Ladislav Chudík as Bagar
- Jaroslav Mareš as Antos
- Karel Höger as Trnec
- Jaroslav Průcha as Dejmek
- Vlasta Fabianová as Dejmkova
