= Jan Žižka (1955 film) =

- Directed by: Otakar Vávra
- Written by: Milos Václav Kratochvíl; Otakar Vávra
- Starring: Zdeněk Štěpánek
- Release date: 1955
- Running time: 102 minutes
- Country: Czechoslovakia
- Language: Czech

Jan Žižka is a 1955 Czechoslovak film directed by Otakar Vávra. The film starred Zdeněk Štěpánek. It is sequel to Jan Hus. Plot takes place between 1419 and 1420. The central motif of the film is the escalation of the situation in Bohemia after the burning of master Jan Hus and the popular revolt against the papal authority and against the new King Sigismund. At the head of this rebellion is a priest Jan Želivský and the king's aide and later governor Jan Žižka. The film was followed by Against All.

== Cast ==
- Zdeněk Štěpánek as Jan Žižka of Trocnova
- František Horák as Jan Zelivský
- Karel Höger as Wenceslaus, Czech king
- Vlasta Matulová as Sophia, Czech queen
- Ladislav Pešek as Miserere the jester
- Jan Pivec as Sigismund, Holy Roman Emperor
- Václav Voska as Čeněk of Wartenberg
- Vítězslav Vejražka as Václav of Dubá
- Gustav Hilmar as John of Chlum
- Marie Tomášová as Johanka the servant
- Josef Kemr as Ješek the student
- Rudolf Hrušínský as burgomaster's son

== Plot ==
In the beginning, we follow a servant Johanka who travels through Bohemia after execution of Jan Hus and leads the fugitives to forbidden sermons in the mountains. Her group is ambushed by the units of the lord from Rožmberk and only with luck she manages to escape from the lord's henchmen.

King Wenceslas IV is being blackmailed by the emissaries of his brother Sigismund of Luxembourg and the Pope at this time. They threaten him with the declaration of a crusade if the Hussite movement in the country is not suppressed and Wenceslaus fails to return the confiscated church property to the Catholics. Wenceslas eventually succumbs to the pressure and bans meeting in crowds in the country. He orders his adjutant Jan Žižek to confiscate weapons of all Prague citizens.

Students Ješek and Prokůpek are captured, along with three journeymen from Prague in a clash with the king's soldiers. Against king's orders, Žižka arms the Prague poor and priest Jan Želivský leads them to the New Town Hall, where all the prisoners are held hostage. An armed mob led by Želivský and Jan Žižka converges in front of the town hall. Žižka demands the release of the prisoners but the crowd is attacked by the king's men while councilors order prisoners to be executed, but the Hussite mob break through the gate and gets in. The mob manages to free four surviving captives, as the student Ješek is killed before he can be saved. The angry crowd then throws councillors from windows of the town hall and spontaneously elects Jan Žižka as their leader and governor.

When Wenceslas, who was staying at a hunting lodge near the capital, learns about these revolutionary events and Jan Žižka's betrayal, he is seized with an outburst of rage, and dies of a stroke afterwards. King's death further strengthens the position of the rebellious Hussites, who do not agree with the high nobility and consider the king's younger brother Sigismund to be Wenceslas' successor. Queen Žofia flees Prague while Wenceslas' body is secretly transported to the Zbraslav Monastery for burial.

The Holy Roman Emperor Sigismund receives news of his brother's death while campaigning against the Turks threatening the Kingdom of Hungary from the south. Sigismund orders Czech nobility to suppress the rebellion in Bohemia and appoints Cenek of Vartenberk as his representative in the country. Nobility loyal to Sigismund fights with the people of Prague, who support the rural Hussites. The Hussites succeed in occupying the Old Town, but are betrayed by rich merchants from the Old Town, who make a secret agreement with Vartemberk and occupy Prague Castle and Vyšehrad, thus completely encircling the city of Prague.

Jan Žižka and priest Václav Koranda will therefore lead a part of the radical-minded Hussites from Prague heading to Tábor a mountain located near Sezimovo Ústí. On this road (from Plzeň to Tábor), a group of Hussites led by Žižka is ambushed near Sudoměř by units of the lord's cavalry (land cash) and Johannites from Strakonice. The film climaxes in a battle in which the Hussites defeat and disperse the overwhelming force of the Catholic knights. The maid Johanka dies in the fight, but the other Hussites manage to reach the desired Tábor after the battle.

== Production ==
The film Jan Žižka was filmed in 1955. Historians Josef Macek, Jan Durdík and Eduard Wagner worked as historical and military advisers on the set. The music, which was played by mayor Jiří Srnek, was arranged by the Film Symphony Orchestra and the Choir of the Czechoslovak Radio, conducted by František Belfín. Jiří Trnka was in charge of the film's costume department. In addition to studios and film buildings, the film was also shot in southern Bohemia. The final scene depicting the battle of Sudoměř was filmed exactly in the places where the battle actually took place in 1420. Residents of villages located near the battlefield acted as extras in the film.

Filming took place with the participation of units of the Czechoslovak army, Svazarm clubs supplying a number of horses for the filming and the Institute of Military History.

== Reception ==
Like other parts of Vávra's Hussite trilogy the film is valued to this day for its monumentality, set, costumes and successful battle scenes. Nevertheless, this film is often criticized for its excessive use of the regime of the 1950s, its schematicity, its constructive enthusiasm and its distortion of history.
