= Jan Želivský =

Czech priest (1380–1422)

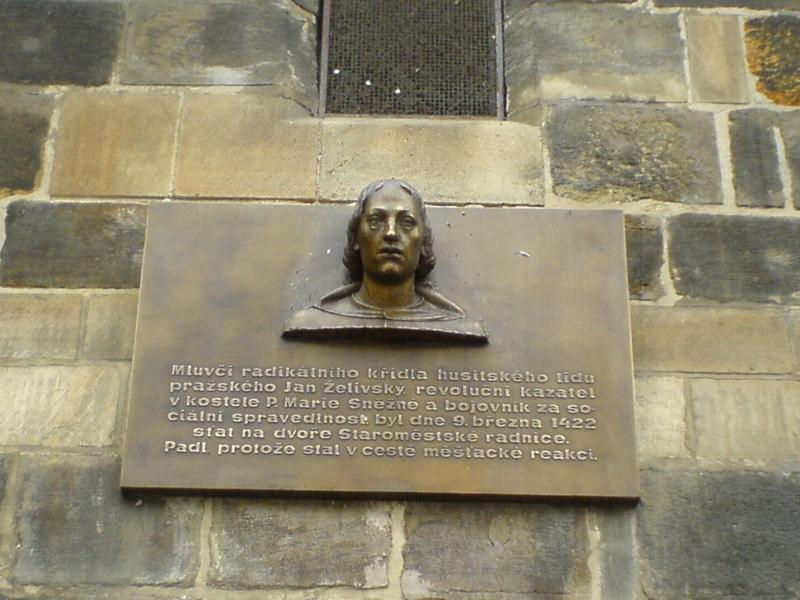
Memorial plaque of Želivský in Old Town, Prague

Jan Želivský (1380 in Humpolec – 9 March 1422 in Prague) was a prominent Czech priest during the Hussite Reformation.

== Life ==
Želivský preached at Church of Saint Mary Major. He was one of a few Utraquist priests in Prague at the time and he was strongly influential, owing to his sermons which were noted both for their eloquence and their apocalyptic descriptions.

On 30 July 1419, Želivský led the Hussite procession through the streets of Prague, and past the New Town Hall.

"The priest and his followers were, however, received with derision by the town-councillors, who appears at the windows, and stones were thrown at the procession. One of the stones struck Priest John [Želivský]... and the infuriated people immediately attempted to storm the town hall."

This event ended in the First Defenestration of Prague, which was one of the major triggering events for the Hussite Wars.

After his defeat in the Battle of Brüx in 1421, Želivský was removed from command. On 9 March 1422, during the civil wars between the various Hussite factions, he was arrested by the town council of Prague and decapitated.

== Legacy ==
Many streets in the Czech Republic are named after Jan Želivský, including a 1,400 metres (4,600 ft) long street in Prague. The nearby Želivského metro station is named after him as well.
