= Ladislav Pešek =

Czech actor

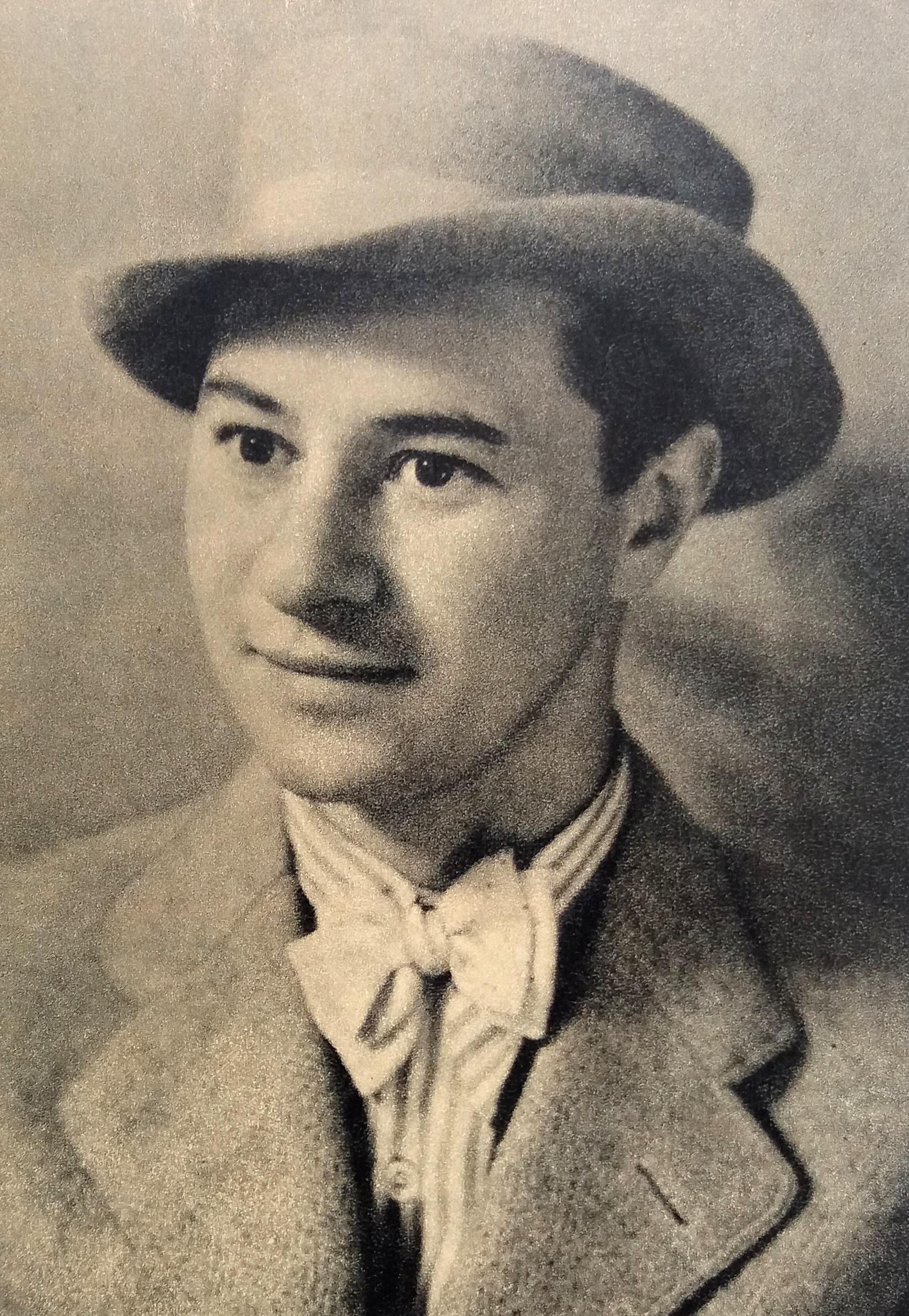
- Pešek in 1929
- Born: 4 October 1906; Brno, Bohemia, Austria-Hungary
- Died: 13 July 1986 (aged 79); Prague, Czechoslovakia
- Occupation: Actor
- Years active: 1931–1984

Signature
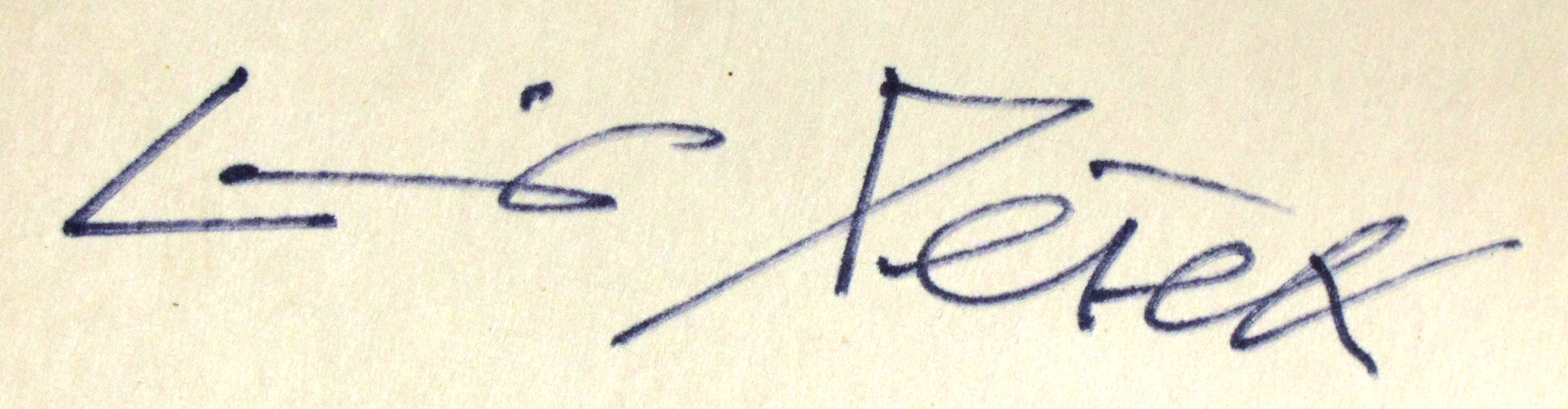

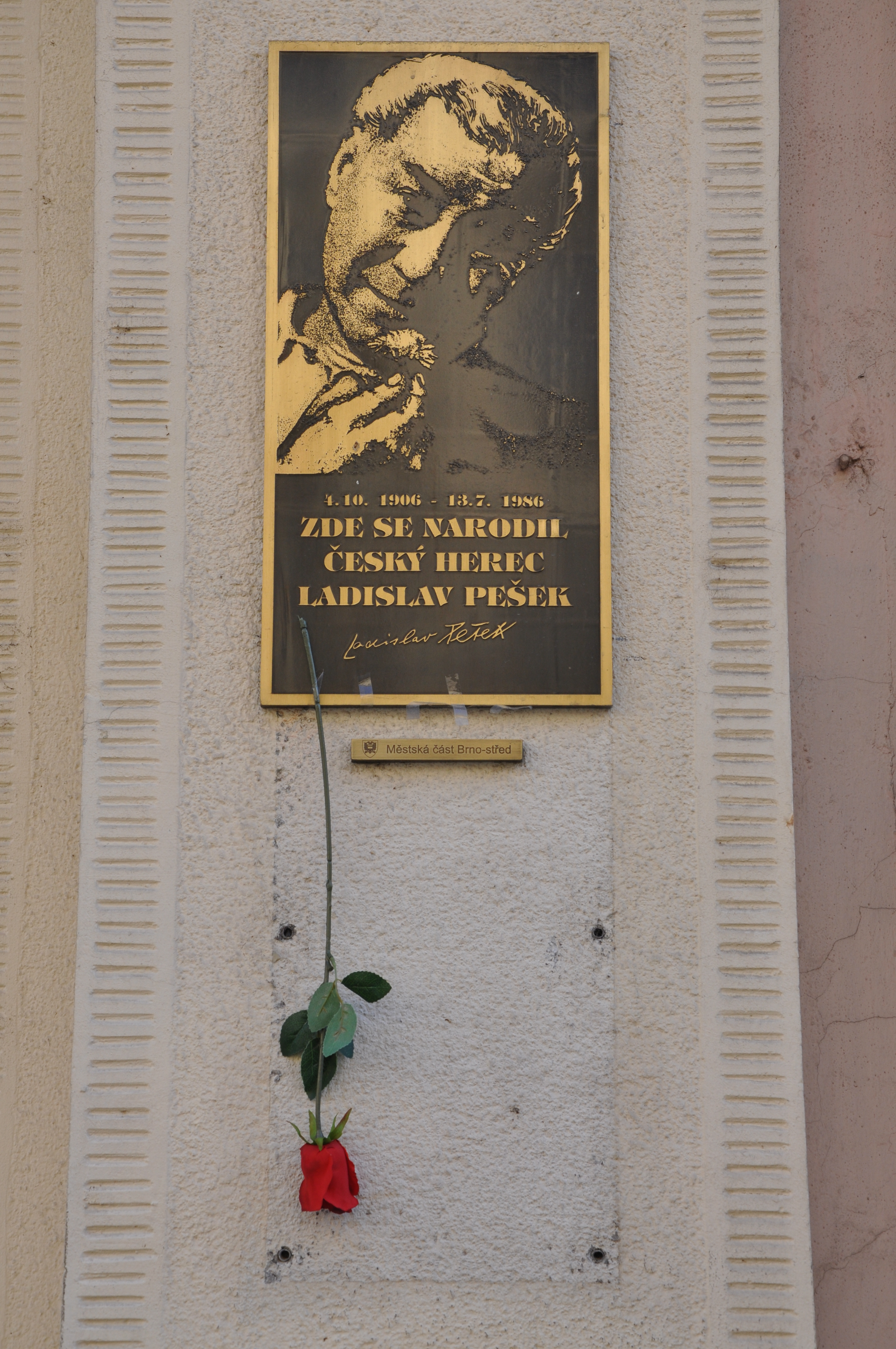
Memorial plaque on his birth house in Brno

Ladislav Pešek (4 October 1906 – 13 July 1986) was a Czech film actor. He appeared in more than 90 films and television shows between 1931 and 1984.

== Selected filmography ==
- Lidé na kře (1937)
- Škola základ života (1938)
- The Merry Wives (1938)
- Cesta do hlubin študákovy duše (1939)
- The Masked Lover (1940)
- Ladies in Waiting (1940)
- The Hard Life of an Adventurer (1941)
- A Charming Man (1941)
- The Blue Star Hotel (1941)
- Valentin the Good (1942)
- Judgement Day (1949)
- Komedianti (1954)
- Jan Hus (1954)
- Dog's Heads (1955)
- Jan Žižka (1955)
- Focus, Please! (1956)
- September Nights (1957)
- Dinner for Adele (1977) – Professor Albín Boček
