= Zdeněk Štěpánek =

Czech actor

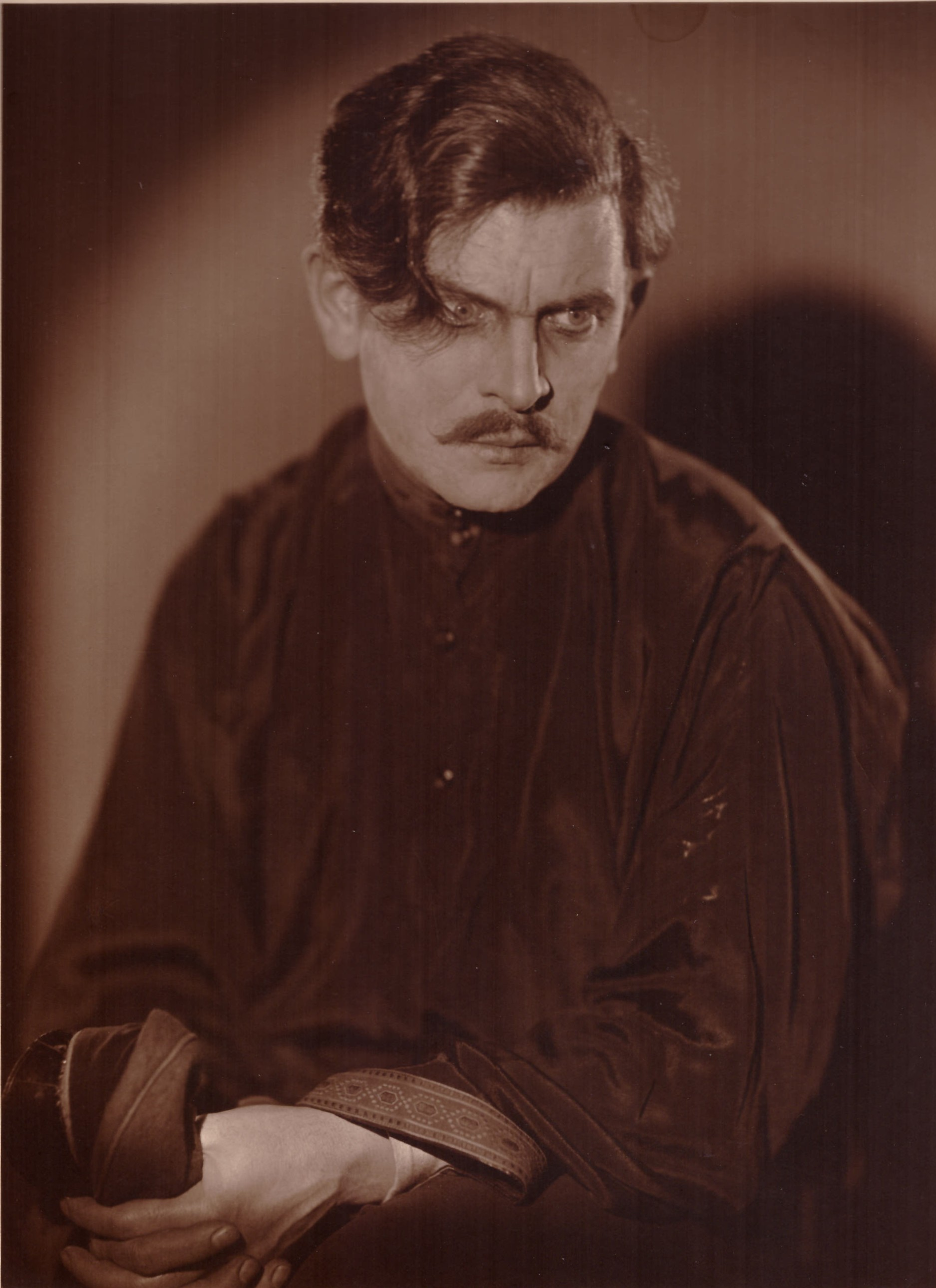
- Štěpánek in 1931.
- Born: 22 September 1896; Tvoršovice, Bohemia, Austria-Hungary (now Czech Republic)
- Died: 20 June 1968 (aged 71); Prague, Czechoslovakia (now Czech Republic)
- Occupation: Actor
- Years active: 1922-1968

Zdeněk Štěpánek (22 September 1896 – 20 June 1968) was a Czech actor. He appeared in 65 films between 1922 and 1968.

== Life ==
In 1915 Zdeněk Štěpánek joined Austro-Hungarian Army and fought at the Eastern Front. He later switched sides and joined Czechoslovak Legion, in which he participated in the Russian Civil War. He was evacuated through Vladivostok and he returned to Czechoslovakia in 1920. From 1934 he was front-actor of the National Theatre in Prague. He was also member of Czechoslovak Masonic Lodge in Prague.

== Selected filmography ==
- St. Wenceslas (1930)
- Paradise Road (1936)
- The World Is Ours (1937)
- Skeleton on Horseback (1937)
- Virginity (1937)
- The Merry Wives (1938)
- Muž z neznáma (1939)
- The Magic House (1939)
- Second Tour (1940)
- Experiment (1943)
- Mist on the Moors (1943)
- Rozina, the Love Child (1945)
- The Adventurous Bachelor (1946)
- Sign of the Anchor (1947)
- Lost in the Suburbs (1948)
- Císařův pekař a pekařův císař (1951)
- The Secret of Blood (1953)
- Jan Hus (1954)
- Dog's Heads (1955)
- Jan Žižka (1955)
- Against All (1956)
- The Flood (1958)
- Today for the Last Time (1958)
- Fetters (1961)
- Hvězda zvaná Pelyněk (1964)
- Hands Up, Or I'll Shoot (1966/2009)
