= Gustav Hilmar =

Czech actor

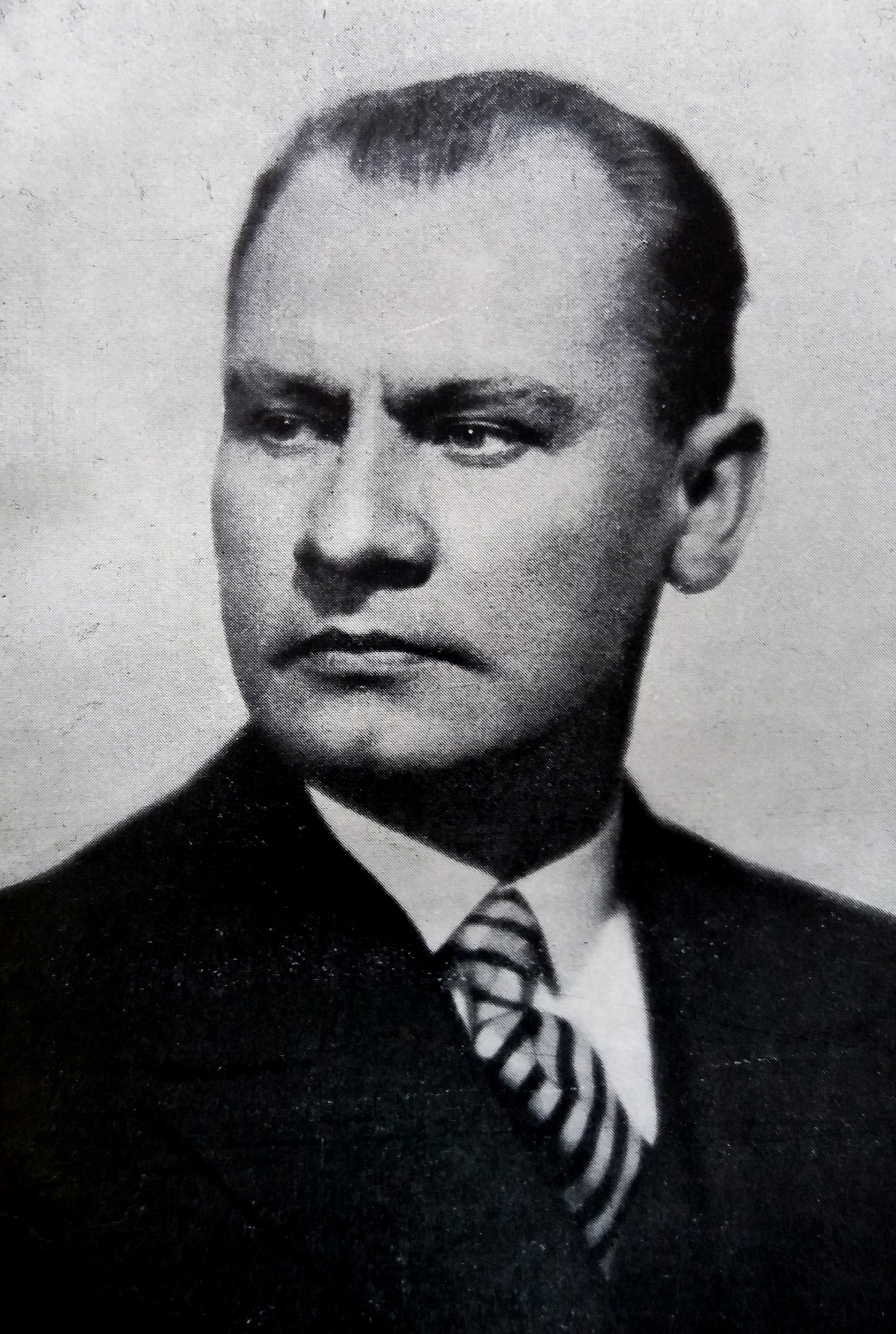
- Born: 30 January 1891; Podlázky, Bohemia, Austria-Hungary
- Died: 19 March 1967 (aged 76); Prague, Czechoslovakia
- Occupation: Actor
- Years active: 1927–1964

Gustav Hilmar, real name Gustav Černý (30 January 1891 – 19 March 1967) was a Czech film actor. He appeared in 46 films between 1927 and 1964.

He is buried at the Vinohrady Cemetery.

== Selected filmography ==
- Hordubalové (1937)
- Andula Won (1937)
- The Lantern (1938)
- Škola základ života (1938)
- Eva tropí hlouposti (1939)
- Muzikantská Liduška (1940)
- Pacientka Dr. Hegla (1940)
- The Girl from Beskydy Mountains (1944)
- Rozina, the Love Child (1945)
- The Adventurous Bachelor (1946)
- Průlom (1946)
- Thunder in the Hills (1946)
- Capek's Tales (1947)
- Divá Bára (1949)
- The Secret of Blood (1953)
- Jan Hus (1954)
- Jan Žižka (1955)
- Against All (1956)
