= Otakar Vávra =

Czech film director (1911–2011)

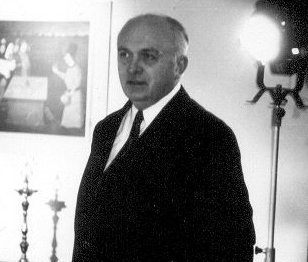
- Otakar Vávra in 1980
- Born: 28 February 1911; Hradec Králové, Austria-Hungary
- Died: 15 September 2011 (aged 100); Prague, Czech Republic
- Occupations: Film director and script writer

Otakar Vávra (28 February 1911 – 15 September 2011) was a Czech film director, screenwriter and pedagogue.

== Biography and career ==
Vávra attended universities in Brno and Prague, where he studied architecture. During 1929–30, while still a student, he participated in the making of a handful of documentaries and wrote movie scripts. In 1931, he produced the experimental film Světlo proniká tmou. The first movie he directed was 1937's Panenství.

His 1938 film The Merry Wives was praised in Variety for "first-rate direction, a salty yarn and elaborate production effort", even though it had undergone certain cuts because it was considered too "ribald" by American censors.

Vávra was a member of the Communist Party from 1945 to 1989. After the Communists seized power in 1948, Vávra adapted quickly to the new political climate and produced films praising the current regime and supporting the new, official interpretation of the past.

In the 1950s he filmed the "Hussite Trilogy", one of his most famous works, consisting of Jan Hus (1954), Jan Žižka (1955) and Against All (1957).

In the 1960s, Vávra made his most celebrated films Zlatá reneta (1965), Romance for Bugle (1966) and Witchhammer (1969). Romance for Bugle was entered into the 5th Moscow International Film Festival where it won the Special Silver Prize.

In the 1970s Vávra produced his "War Trilogy" consisting of semi-documentary movies Dny zrady, Sokolovo and Osvobození Prahy, all being heavily influenced by communist propaganda. The film Dny zrady (Days of Betrayal, 1973) was entered into the 8th Moscow International Film Festival where it won a Diploma. In 1979 he was a member of the jury at the 11th Moscow International Film Festival.

Since the 1950s Vávra taught film direction at Film and TV School of the Academy of Performing Arts in Prague. Among his students were several directors of the "Czech New Wave".

== Awards ==
In 2001, he was awarded the Czech Lion for his lifelong contribution to Czech cinema. In 2004, he received the presidential Medal of Merit.

== Criticism ==
Vávra's critics point to his willingness to accommodate the Communist regime. In a 2003 article ("Playing the Villain", The Globe and Mail, May 15, 2003) about his documentary film, Hitler and I that he shot in Prague, David Cherniack described the following encounter with his former FAMU head professor:

Having lived in a police state for four years and seen the difficult choices that people make between ends and means, I decide to interview my head professor from the academy, National Artist Otakar Vavra. Now 92 but still very sharp, Vavra made 50 feature films under every regime from the thirties on, including the seven years of the Nazi occupation. Though he maintains he was serving his films and the public by doing the minimum necessary to co-operate, others are of the view that he was serving himself. The films of his that I've seen tend to be rather didactic history lessons. I meet him at the Theatre Restaurant where he lunches every day and still conducts business. Behind the bluster and razor-sharp intellect that is still very much present, I sense a sad and isolated old man who feels he should be enjoying the adulation of his country and not being as ignored as he is. My own Fritz Gerlich (a Catholic newspaper editor executed in Dachau during the Night of the Long Knives) was our teaching assistant, the New Wave director Evald Schorm. Unlike Vavra, he refused to sign a paper agreeing with the 1968 occupation by the Warsaw Pact. Schorm went to his own Dachau. He was forced to leave the school and filmmaking and go direct operas in Brno. One of the Czech actors on the set tells me he died an embittered man shortly before the Velvet Revolution. Reality is always more complex than the stories we tell about it.
