= Battalion (1937 film) =

- Directed by: Miroslav Cikán
- Screenplay by: Josef Neuberg; Jaroslav Mottl; Julius Schmitt
- Based on: Batalion (play) by Josef Hais-Týnecký
- Starring: František Smolík; Helena Bušová; Hana Vítová
- Cinematography: Jan Roth
- Edited by: Antonín Zelenka
- Music by: Josef Stelibský
- Production company: Metropolitan Film
- Distributed by: Metropolitan Film
- Release date: 1 October 1937
- Running time: 93 minutes
- Country: Czechoslovakia
- Language: Czech

Battalion (Czech: Batalion) is a 1937 Czechoslovak war drama film, directed by Miroslav Cikán. It stars František Smolík, Helena Bušová, and Hana Vítová.

== Cast ==
- František Smolík as JUDr. František Uher
- Helena Bušová as Anna Uhrová
- Hana Vítová as Marie Žďárská alias Mimi
- Jaroslav Průcha as Václav Šulc
- Václav Trégl as František Vondruška
- František Kreuzmann as Beznoska
- Ladislav Pešek as Honzík
- Eduard Kohout as Ferdinand Koranda
- Karel Veverka as Mašek
- Milada Gampeová as Mrs. Mastná
- Ella Nollová as Harphist
- Marenka Zieglerová as Waitress in Battalion
