= Okouzlená =

1942 film

- Theatrical poster
- Directed by: Otakar Vávra
- Written by: Otakar Vávra
- Starring: Nataša Gollová
- Cinematography: Ferdinand Pečenka
- Edited by: Antonín Zelenka
- Music by: Jiří Srnka
- Production company: Lucernafilm
- Distributed by: Lucernafilm
- Release date: 1942
- Running time: 94 minutes
- Country: Czechoslovakia
- Language: Czech

Okouzlená (English: Enchanted) is a 1942 Czechoslovak drama film directed by Otakar Vávra.

== Cast ==
- Nataša Gollová as Lenka Bártová
- Václav Vydra as Rupert Hojtaš
- Leopolda Dostalová as Hojtašová
- Adina Mandlová as Model Milada Janská
- Marie Glázrová as Jitka Zykanová
- Karel Höger as Lawyer Pavel Chvojka
- Jan Pivec as Painter Jan Karas
- Stanislava Strobachová as Olga
