= Děvče za výkladem =

- Directed by: Miroslav Cikán
- Screenplay by: Julius Kalas, Miroslav Cikán
- Produced by: Josef Stein
- Starring: Hana Vítová, Helena Bušová, and Zdenek Hora.
- Cinematography: Jan Roth
- Edited by: Antonín Zelenka
- Music by: Julius Kalas
- Production company: Lepka
- Release date: 1937
- Running time: 96 minutes
- Country: Czechoslovakia

Děvče za výkladem is a 1937 Czechoslovak film directed by Miroslav Cikán. It stars Hana Vítová, Helena Bušová, and Zdeněk Hora.

== Cast ==
- Hana Vítová as Inka
- Helena Bušová as Bozka
- Zdeněk Hora as Ferda
- Milka Balek-Brodská as Simunkova
- Antonín Bukový as Film Lighting Man
- Bedřich Frank as Policeman
- Marie Hallerová
- Ladislav Hemmer as Film Director
