= Vzdušné torpédo 48 =

- Directed by: Miroslav Cikán
- Written by: Karel Hašler
- Starring: Otomar Korbelář, Antonín Novotný, and Raoul Schránil.
- Cinematography: Jaroslav Blažek, Otto Heller
- Edited by: Antonín Zelenka
- Music by: Miloš Smatek
- Production company: Lloydfilm
- Release date: 1937
- Country: Czechoslovakia

Vzdusné torpédo 48 is a 1937 Czechoslovak psychological drama film directed by Miroslav Cikán. It stars Otomar Korbelář, Antonín Novotný, and Raoul Schránil.

== Cast ==
- Otomar Korbelář as Colonel Svarc, chief of counterespionage
- Antonín Novotný as Lieutenant Petr Nor, inventor of air torpedo
- Raoul Schránil as Flying Officer Jan Domin
- Míla Reymonová as Violinist Irena Vengerová
- Andrej Bagar as Arnost Gettering, director of the refinery alias chief intelligence service
- Karel Hašler as MUDr. Marvan
- Zita Kabátová as Helena
- Jaroslav Marvan as Generál Herold
- Karel Postránecký as Adjutant
- Jaroslav Průcha as Commisionar
