= Blackmailer (1937 film) =

- Directed by: Ladislav Brom
- Screenplay by: Jan S. Kolár
- Based on: Ztracený stín by Egon Hostovský
- Starring: Vítězslav Boček; Adina Mandlová; Helena Bušová
- Cinematography: Jan Roth
- Edited by: Antonín Zelenka
- Music by: Josef Dobeš
- Production company: Reiter Film
- Distributed by: Reiter Film
- Release date: November 26, 1937
- Running time: 87 minutes
- Country: Czechoslovakia
- Language: Czech

Blackmailer (Czech: Vyděrač) is a 1937 Czech drama film directed by Ladislav Brom. The film sets were designed by the art director Jan Zázvorka.

== Cast ==
- Vítězslav Boček as Accountant Josef Bašek
- Adina Mandlová as Shoe saleswoman Máša Lírová
- Bedřich Vrbský as Industrialist Emil Frýbl
- Helena Bušová as Olga Frýblová
- Jiří Plachý as Alfréd Merhaut
- Rudolf Deyl as President of the syndicate
- Jan S. Kolár as Director of the syndicate
- František Kreuzmann as Lawyer Piroh
- Gustav Hilmar as Accountant Dufek
- Ladislav Pešek as Medicine student Petr Hureš
