= In the Little House Below Emauzy =

1933 film

- Directed by: Otto Kanturek
- Written by: Otakar Hanus; Karel Hašler; Otto Rádl
- Starring: Adina Mandlová; Antonín Novotný; Ferdinand Hart
- Cinematography: Václav Vích
- Edited by: Marie Bourová
- Music by: Emil Maiwald
- Production company: Oka Film
- Distributed by: Oka Film
- Release date: 27 October 1933
- Running time: 72 minutes
- Country: Czechoslovakia
- Language: Czech

In the Little House Below Emauzy (Czech: V tom domecku pod Emauzy) is a 1933 Czech musical drama film directed by Otto Kanturek and starring Adina Mandlová, Antonín Novotný and Ferdinand Hart. It is based on the 1911 operetta Alt-Wien which used melodies by Joseph Lanner (1801–1843). A separate German-language version The Happiness of Grinzing was also produced. Such multiple-language versions were common during the early years of sound film. It was shot at the Barrandov Studios in Prague with sets were designed by the art director Bohumil Heš. Whereas the operetta and the German version were set in Vienna, this film is set close to the Emmaus Monastery in the Czech capital during the nineteenth century.

== Cast ==
- Adina Mandlová as Apolenka Dudková / Komtesa Lubecká
- Antonín Novotný as Postilion Jan Martin
- Ferdinand Hart as Lopata
- Hermína Fordová as Hrabenka Alzbeta Marie Lubecká
- Helga Nováková as Stázinka Dudková
- Theodor Pištěk as Hostinský Frantisek Dudek
- Alexander Trebovský as Hrabe Quido Bertran Lubecký
- Anna Steimarová as ucitelka hudby Gusta Volmanová
- Anton Vaverka as Komorník Alois
- Walter Taub as Písar August Steibitz
- Jirí Plachý as Ucitel bontonu
- Rudolf Podlesák as ucitel tance Ernesto Pagini
- Antonín Schmerzenreich as hrabe Vrbna
- Josef Bunzl as ucitel dejepisu a matematiky Marvan
- Miro Bernat as Cellista
- Věra Ferbasová as Host na vecírku

== Bibliography ==
- Goble, Alan. The Complete Index to Literary Sources in Film. Walter de Gruyter, 1999.
- Dassanowsky, Robert von. Austrian Cinema: A History. McFarland, 2005.
