= Jan Roth =

Czech cinematographer

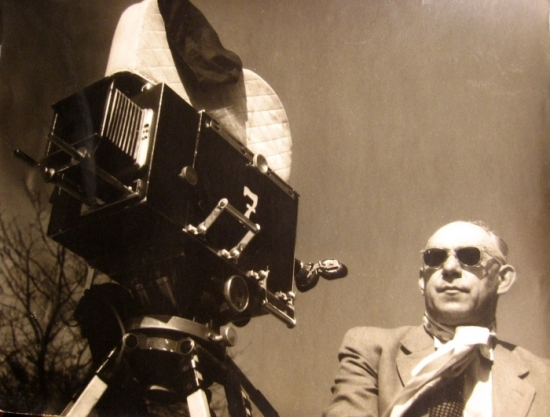
- Born: 10 November 1899; Náchod, Austro-Hungarian Empire
- Died: 4 October 1972 (aged 72); Prague, Czechoslovakia
- Occupation: Cinematographer
- Years active: 1923–1969
- Spouse: Marie Hildebrandtová
- Family: Kateřina Jacques (great grand-daughter); Monika MacDonagh-Pajerová (great grand-daughter)

Jan Roth (10 November 1899 – 4 October 1972) was a Czech cinematographer. During World War I he served in the Austro-Hungarian Navy. Roth started his career as a lighting technician at the New German theatre in Prague. In 1926 he became a chief lighting technician at Karel Lamač's Kavalírka film studio. Roth later served as Otto Heller's assistant on Lamač's films. In 1934 he started to work as a cameraman. He soon became of the most prolific cinematographers of the Czechoslovak cinema. Following the German occupation of Czechoslovakia in 1939 he continued to work for both Czech and German productions at Barrandov Studios. Roth often collaborated with directors Otakar Vávra and Martin Frič. He was noted for his ability to create Chiaroscuro effects.

== Selected filmography ==
- Three Men in the Snow (1936)
- Irca's Romance (1936)
- Escape to the Adriatic (1937)
- Lojzička (1936)
- Děvče za výkladem (1937)
- Battalion (1937)
- Virginity (1937)
- Blackmailer (1937)
- The Magic House (1939)
- Arthur and Leontine (1940)
- Ladies in Waiting (1940)
- The Waitress Anna (1941)
- Goodbye, Franziska (1941)
- We Make Music (1942)
- His Son (1942)
- Beloved Darling (1943)
- The Second Shot (1942)
- Love Premiere (1943)
- Experiment (1943)
- A Kiss from the Stadium (1948)
- The Proud Princess (1952)
- The Princess with the Golden Star (1959)
- Nejlepší ženská mého života (1968)
