= Ladislav Žák =

Czech architect, painter, and teacher

- Ladislav Žák
- Born: 25 June 1900; Prague, Austria-Hungary
- Died: 26 May 1973 (aged 72); Prague, Czechoslovakia

Ladislav Žák (25 June 1900 – 26 May 1973 in Prague) was a Czech architect, painter, architectural theorist and teacher. He was an important exponent of the Czech functionalist architecture in the 1930s, later he devoted himself mainly to landscape architecture. In his theoretical works, he laid the foundations of the Czech landscape ecology.

== Early years ==
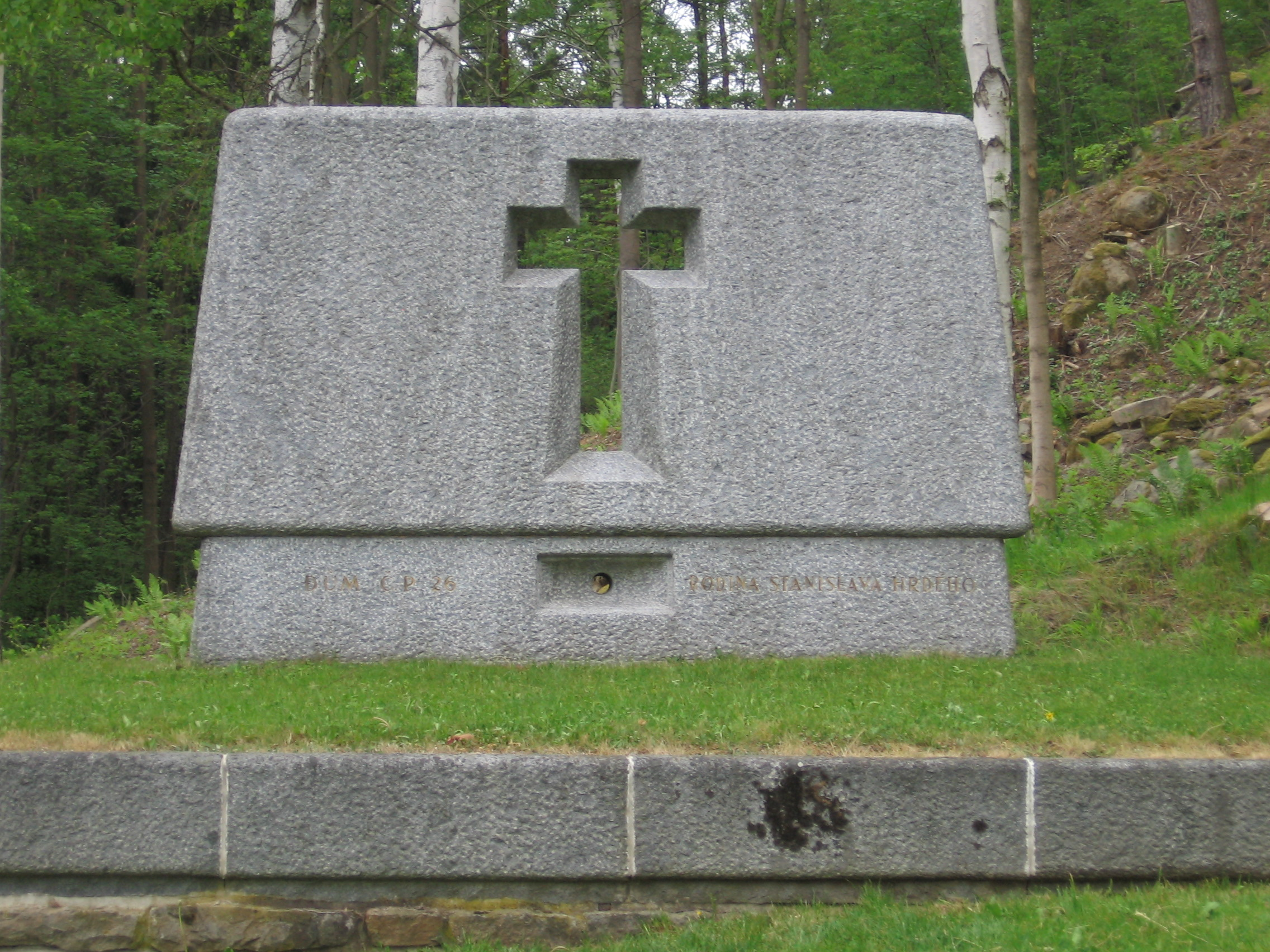
Stone memorial in Ležáky, a village razed to the ground by Nazis during the German occupation of Czechoslovakia.

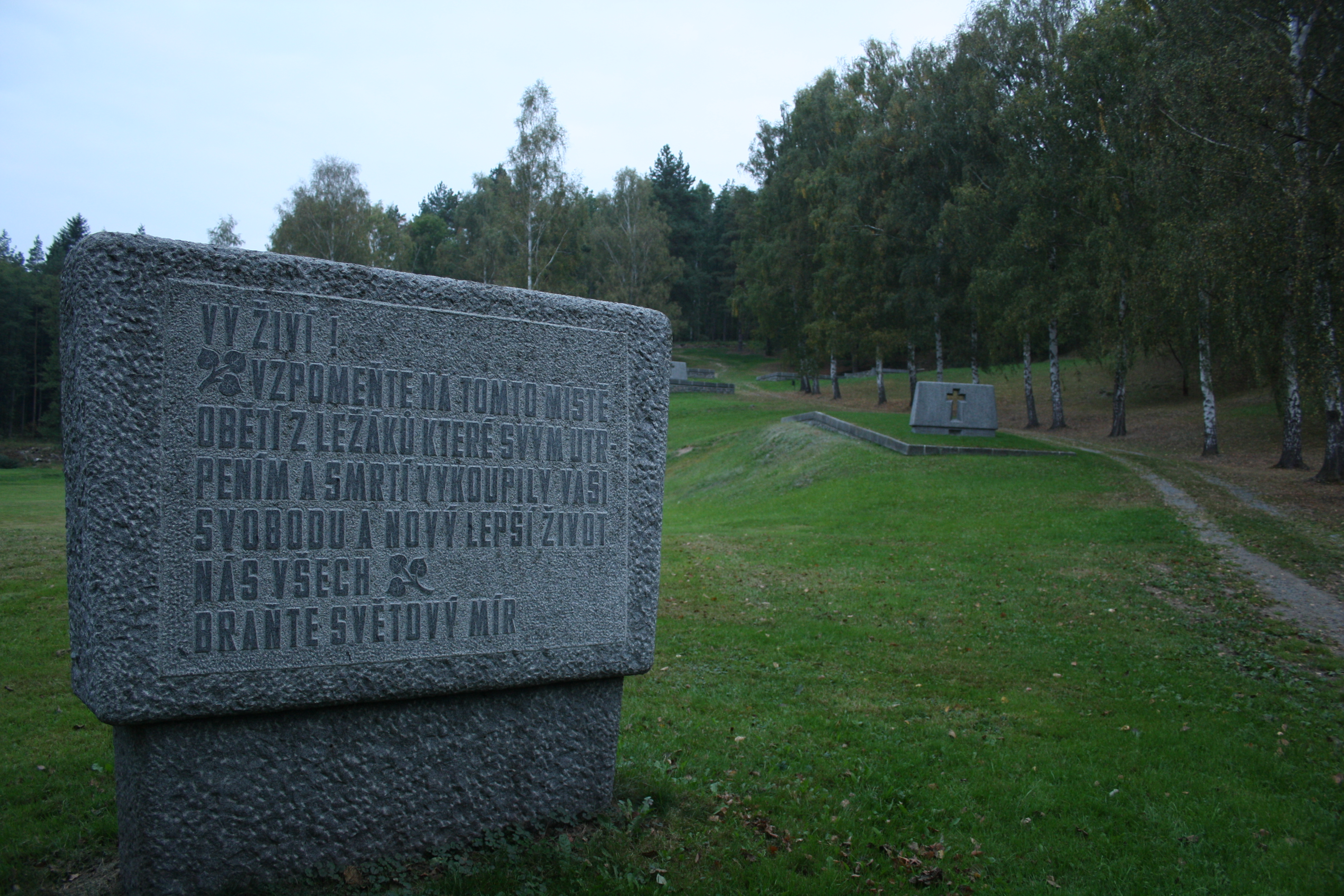
Stone memorial in Ležáky built by Ladislav Žák.

From 1911 to 1915 he attended school in Mladá Boleslav. He transferred to Prague's Malá Strana in 1915, and graduated in 1919. He then began the study of painting at the Academy of Fine Arts in the studio of Professor Karl Krattner. In 1923, he graduated which entitled him to teach drawing and painting. Shortly afterwards, he began teaching drawing in Prague, but soon thereafter, began to study architecture under Josef Gočár at the Academy, completing the course in 1927.

== Career ==
Also in 1927, Žák wrote his first theoretical essay, O syntézu kreslení dneška (On the Synthesis of Drawing Today).

In the 1930s, he participated in designing of Prague's functionalist housing estate known as Baba. Examples of his work in Baba include the interior plans of Spišek House, the terrace addition to Uhlíř House, as well as being the architect for Villa Čeněk, Villa Herain, Villa Hain, and Villa Zaorálek. In 1932, he developed the concept of Werkbund houses that contained a bedroom for one person only along with other functional spaces. Žák found design inspiration from ocean liners and airplanes.

After gaining an interest in the architecture of villas, in his early thirties, he built several villas which are considered masterpieces of Czech functionalism. From 1934 to 1935, he designed villas of the filmmaker Martin Frič and the actress Lída Baarová. However, later he focused mainly on the furniture design and problems of the landscape architecture. From 1936, he began documenting country landscape in Czechoslovakia. This was particularly difficult following the Czechoslovak coup d'état of 1948, during the period of heavy landscape industrialization. He was intimidated by articles published in the specialized magazines, but thanks to an intercession by his colleague Jaroslav Fragner, Žák was allowed to continue teaching at the Academy of Fine Arts.

After the Second World War, Žák designed a number of stone memorials and gravehouses in Ležáky. In the 1950s, the Praha-Smíchov railway station was enlarged following the plans of Žák and Jan Zázvorka.

In his later years, Žák focused mainly on developing his architectural theories. He summarized his research and insights in his main theoretical work, Obytná krajina ("The Inhabited Landscape"), which was published in 1947.

== Personal life ==
He was a member of left-wing associations, such as the Socialist Union of Architects.

== Works ==
=== Unrealized designs ===
- Villa Venera, 1930, Bílovice nad Svitavou - unrealized project of a villa for František Venera

=== Realizations ===
- Villa Zaorálek, 1931–1932, Prague 6 - Dejvice, No. 1708, Na Ostrohu 54 - villa for the section chief of the Ministry of Education, Hugo Zaorálek.
- Villa Čeněk, 1932, Prague 6 - Dejvice, No. 1777, Na Babě 11 - villa for the music pedagogue Bohumil Čeněk.
- Villa Herain, 1928–1932, Prague 6 - Dejvice, No. 1782, Na Babě 3 - villa for the art historian and director of the Museum of Decorative Arts in Prague, Karel Herain.
- Villa Hajn, 1932–1933, Prague 9 - Vysočany, No. 404, Na Vysočanských vinicích 31 - villa for the aircraft designer and founder of the company Avia, Miroslav Hajn.
- Villa Martin Frič, 1935, Prague 4 - Hodkovičky, No. 404, Na Lysinách 9 - villa for the film director Martin Frič.
- Villa Lida Baar, 1937, Prague 6 - Dejvice, No. 677, Neherovská 8 - villa for the actress Lída Baarová.
- Memorial Ležáky, 1945-1960.
