= Nezlobte dědečka =

- Directed by: Karel Lamač
- Written by: Emil Artur Longen; Karel Melíšek; Jaroslav Mottl
- Based on: V tlamě velryby (play) by Emil Artur Longen
- Produced by: František Jerhot
- Starring: Vlasta Burian; Čeněk Šlégl; Adina Mandlová
- Cinematography: Otto Heller
- Edited by: Jan Kohout
- Music by: Eman Fiala
- Production company: Meissner
- Distributed by: Meissner
- Release date: December 21, 1934
- Running time: 77 minutes
- Country: Czechoslovakia
- Language: Czech

Nezlobte dědečka is a 1934 Czech comedy film directed by Karel Lamač.

== Cast ==
- Vlasta Burian as Eman Vovísek/Uncle Jonathan
- Čeněk Šlégl as Factory owner Adolf Daněk
- Adina Mandlová as Liduška, Daněk's wife
- Hana Vítová as Secretary Josefinka
- Václav Trégl as Daněk's butler
- Jan W. Speerger as Daněk's gardener
- Mariana Hellerová as Aunt Matylda
- Theodor Pištěk as Uncle Hanibal
- Ljuba Hermanová as Dancer Káťa
- Antonín Vaverka as Káťa's fiancé
- Máňa Hanková as Káťa's friend
- Jaroslav Marvan as Dr. Karner
