= Happy Journey (1943 film) =

1943 film

- Advertisement photo for the movie
- Directed by: Otakar Vávra
- Written by: Vilém Werner; Otakar Vávra
- Story by: Olga Horáková
- Starring: Adina Mandlová; Jiřina Štěpničková; Hana Vítová; Nataša Gollová
- Cinematography: Ferdinand Pečenka
- Edited by: Antonín Zelenka
- Music by: Jiří Srnka
- Production company: Lucernafilm
- Distributed by: Lucernafilm
- Release date: 25 December 1943
- Running time: 93 minutes
- Country: Czechoslovakia
- Language: Czech

Happy Journey (Czech: Šťastnou cestu) is a 1943 Czechoslovak drama film directed by Otakar Vávra. The film featured four leading actresses of 1940s Czech cinema – Adina Mandlová, Jiřina Štěpničková, Hana Vítová and Nataša Gollová.

== Cast ==
- Adina Mandlová as Shop assistant Helena Truxová
- Jiřina Štěpničková as Shop assistant Anna Waltrová-Ortová
- Hana Vítová as Shop assistant Milena
- Nataša Gollová as Shop assistant Fanynka
- Jana Dítětová as Boženka
- Otomar Korbelář as Industrialist Jan Klement
- Eduard Kohout as Viktor Zych, Helena's boyfriend
- Vítězslav Vejražka as Waiter Martin, Milena's fiancé
- Karel Hradilák as Fred Valenta
- František Kreuzmann as Cheater Pepa Hodek
- Nelly Gaierová as Hodek's lover
- Jaroslav Marvan as Mall director
- Míla Pačová as Store director Vacková
