= The Poacher from Egerland =

- Directed by: Vladimír Majer
- Written by: Bohumír Polách; Jiří Žalman
- Starring: Oskar Marion; František Šlégr; Markéta Krausová
- Cinematography: Josef Bůžek; Willy Hameister; Josef Střecha; Jan Roth
- Edited by: Antonín Zelenka
- Music by: Jára Beneš
- Production company: Terra Film
- Distributed by: Terra Film
- Release date: 1 November 1934
- Running time: 61 minutes
- Countries: Czechoslovakia; Austria
- Languages: Czech; German

The Poacher from Egerland (Czech: V cizím revíru; German: Der Wilderer vom Egerland) is a 1934 Czechoslovak-Austrian drama film directed by Vladimír Majer and starring Oskar Marion, Frantisek Šlégr and Markéta Krausová. Walter Kolm-Veltée directed the German voiceovers.

== Cast ==
- Oskar Marion as District forest officer Karel Černý
- František Šlégr as Poacher
- Markéta Krausová as Lída
- Vladimír Pospíšil-Born as Landowner Bruno Walter
- Truda Binarová as Mary Walter
- Valentin Šindler as Barrel organ player
- Marie Holanová as Lída's aunt
- Bedřich Frank as Forest worker
- Josef Oliak as Physician
- Karel Postránecký as Gendarme
- R.A. Dvorský as Hotel orchestra conductor
