= Saturday (film) =

- German poster
- Directed by: Václav Wasserman
- Written by: Josef Neuberg; Olga Scheinpflugová
- Starring: Hana Vítová; Adina Mandlová; Jiřina Štěpničková
- Cinematography: Ferdinand Pečenka
- Edited by: Marie Kopecká
- Music by: Josef Stelibský
- Production company: Lucernafilm
- Distributed by: Lucernafilm
- Release date: 12 January 1945
- Country: Czechoslovakia
- Language: Czech

Saturday (Czech: Sobota) is a 1945 Czechoslovak drama film directed by Václav Wasserman and starring Hana Vítová, Adina Mandlová and Jiřina Štěpničková.

== Cast ==
- Hana Vítová as Helena Málková
- Adina Mandlová as Luisa Herbertová
- Jiřina Štěpničková as Karla Bartosová
- Růžena Šlemrová as Herbert's mother
- Paula Valenska as Seller
- Ella Sárková as John's wife
- Oldřich Nový as Richard Herbert
- Ladislav Boháč as Jirí Vales
- František Hanus as Petr Málek
- Bedřich Veverka as Jindrich
- Karel Dostal as Dr. John
- Jindřich Láznička as Hotel doorkeeper
- Jan Fifka as Guest
- Marie Geblerova as Chambermaid
- Marie Hrdlicková as Cycler
- Slávka Jägrová as Customer
- Bohdan Lachman as Usher
- Kvetoslava Pouchlá
- Jiřina Salačová as Singer
- Jan W. Speerger as Hotel headmaster
- Nora Stallich as Josef
- Milos Subrt as Gardener

== Bibliography ==
- Alfred Krautz. International Directory of Cinematographers Set and Costume Designers in Film: Czechoslovakia. Saur, 1991.
