= Come Back to Me (1944 film) =

1944 film

- Directed by: Heinz Paul
- Written by: Ulrich Bettac; Dolly Mollinger
- Starring: Charlott Daudert; Natasa Gollová; Margarete Haagen
- Music by: Lothar Brühne
- Production company: Prag-Film
- Release date: 30 June 1944
- Running time: 75 minutes
- Country: Germany
- Language: German

Come Back to Me (German: Komm zu mir zurück) is a 1944 German comedy film directed by Heinz Paul, starring Charlott Daudert, Natasa Gollová and Margarete Haagen. It was made at the Barrandov Studios in Prague. Location shooting took place around the Wörthersee in Carinthia.

== Cast ==
- Charlott Daudert
- Natasa Gollová
- Margarete Haagen
- O.E. Hasse
- Victor Janson
- Albert Matterstock
- Marina von Ditmar
- Gustav Waldau

== Bibliography ==
- Dvořáková, Tereza & Klimeš, Ivan . Prag-Film AG 1941-1945: im Spannungsfeld zwischen Protektorats- und Reichskinematografie. 2008.
- Klaus, Ulrich J. Deutsche Tonfilme: Jahrgang 1944. Klaus-Archiv, 2006.
