= Markéta Krausová =

Czech Jewish actress and singer

Markéta Krausová (20 April 1895 — 7 July 1942) was a Czech Jewish film and stage actress and opera singer.

== Life and career ==
She was born in Prague in Bohemia, Austria-Hungary (now the Czech Republic) as Margarete Brennerová to the Jewish family of the owner and director of a small company Robert Brenner and Matilda née Oppenheimerová. She had two older brothers and a younger sister. In 1919 she married Oskar Kraus and in 1922 they had a daughter, Felcitas. They divorced in 1926.

Markéta Krausová worked as opera soloist in Munich and Vienna. In 1932 she moved to Prague, where she performed on stage and in film, in particular at the Vlasta Burian Theater. In 1934-1936 she starred in six films. Soon after that she could no longer perform due to her Jewish origin.

Because of a long life abroad she became a citizen of Czechoslovakia only in 1938.

The Czechoslovak Film Database writes that she probably managed to emigrate and her life during this period is unknown. She was transported to the Majdanek concentration camp and was murdered there on 2 July 1942.

== Filmography ==
- 1934: The Poacher from Egerland
- 1934: A Woman Who Knows What She Wants
- 1934: Romance from the Tatra Mountains
- 1935: Král ulice
- 1935: První políbení
- 1936: Lojzička
