= Praha-Smíchov railway station =

Railway station in Prague, Czech Republic

Praha-Smíchov
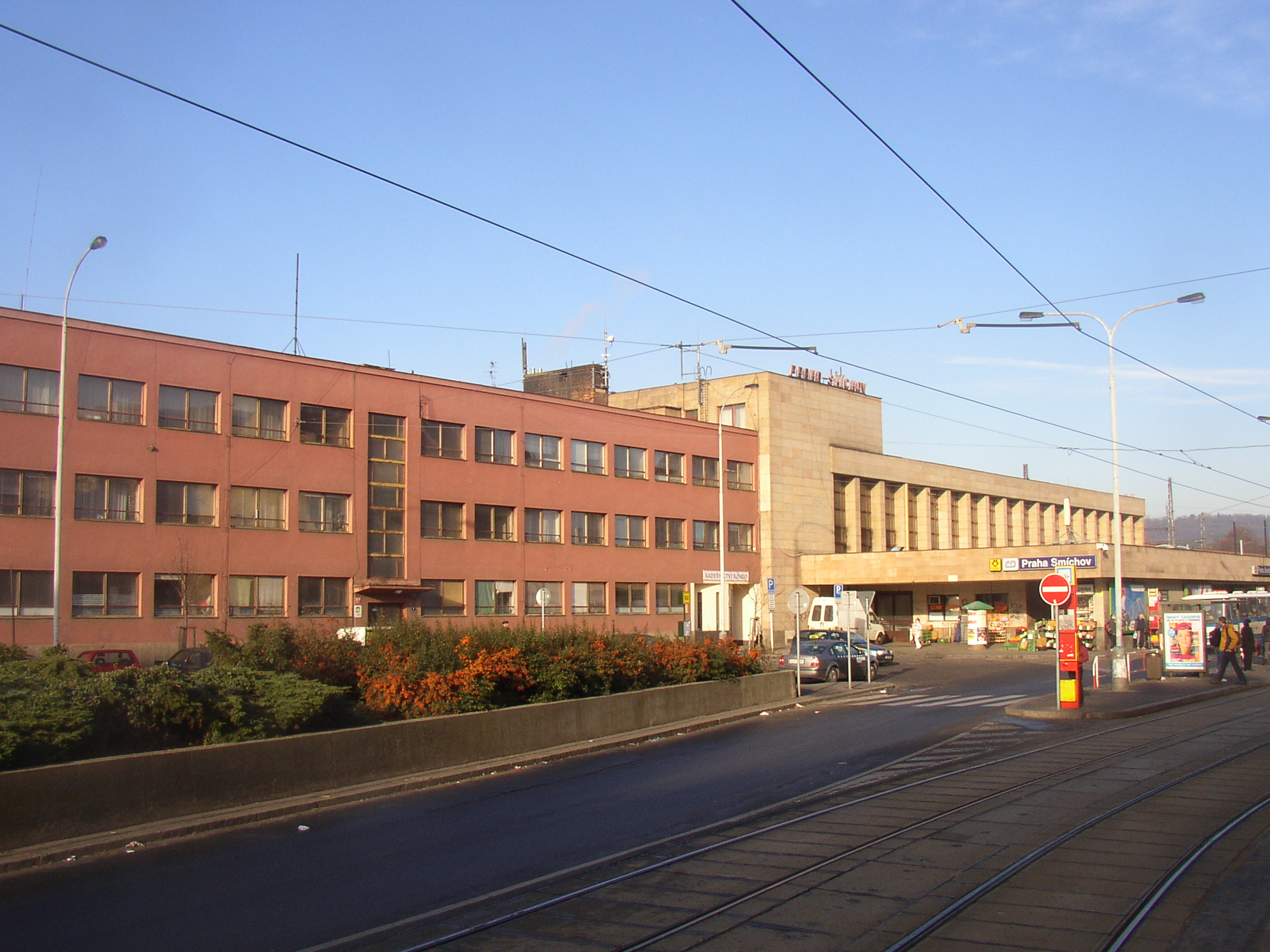
- Praha-Smíchov station and its adjacent tram lines on Nádražní street

General information
- Location: Prague, Nádražní 1 Czech Republic
- Coordinates: 50°03′41″N 14°24′32″E
- Owner: Czech Republic
- Operator: Správa železnic
- Platforms: 4
- Connections: B Smíchovské nádraží 5, 12, 15, 20, 94 City and regional bus lines

Construction
- Architect: Jan Zázvorka; Ladislav Žák

Other information
- Station code: 54572263
- Fare zone: PID: 0

History
- Opened: 1862
- Rebuilt: 1953–1956; 2023–2028 (in progress)

Passengers
- 4 692 000 (2014)

Services
Preceding station	České dráhy	Following station
Plzeň hl.n. towards Františkovy Lázně or Praha hl.n.	SuperCity Pendolino	Praha hl.n. towards Ostrava
Beroun towards Plzeň	R	Praha hl.n. Terminus
Preceding station		Following station
Beroun towards München Hbf	RE 25	Praha hl.n. Terminus
Preceding station	Esko Prague	Following station
Praha-Hlubočepy towards Beroun	S6	Terminus
Praha-Velká Chuchle towards Řevnice or Beroun	S7	Praha hl.n. Terminus
Praha hl.n. Terminus	S65	Praha-Žvahov towards Hostivice or Rudná u Prahy
Praha hl.n. Terminus	R16	Beroun towards Plzeň hl.n.
Location
- Location within Czech Republic Location within Europe

Praha-Smíchov railway station (Czech: Nádraží Praha-Smíchov, [ˈsmiːxof]) is a major railway station in Prague, Czech Republic, located in Smíchov, in the south-west of the city. It serves as a major railway station on the Czech national rail network, and is connected to the rest of Prague by its metro station of the same name and numerous tram routes which stop on Nádražní street outside the station. It is also a major bus terminus for lines going to the south and southwest of Prague and beyond. In 2009 the station served almost 4 million people.

Since 2023 the station has been undergoing a comprehensive reconstruction by Správa železnic, which is expected to be completed at the end of 2028 and will be followed by the reconstruction of the station building.

== History ==
The station was opened in 1862 as the terminus of the line linking Prague to Plzeň, operated by Česká Západní Dráha (Czech Western Railway). In 1872 and 1873, two more lines were built to the station, one from Hostivice and the other from Rudná. The present station building was built between 1953 and 1956 and designed by architects Jan Zázvorka and Ladislav Žák.

Platform 1 before the reconstruction

Platform 3 before the reconstruction

== Services ==
All trains going from Prague towards Plzeň and Písek pass through Smíchov as the first stop after the more central hub, Praha hlavní nádraží. It is also used as a terminus for inter-regional trains serving cities in the east of the Czech Republic, which pass first through hlavní nádraží and terminate at Smíchov. The station has a separate area named Praha-Smíchov severní nástupiště (Praha-Smíchov northern platforms) which is technically a separate station, though it is often shown on abridged timetables as "Praha-Smíchov". These platforms serve the Prague Semmering line to Hostivice, now integrated into the Esko Prague system as line S65. The main station is further served by lines S6, S7 and R16 of the Esko system.

== Reconstruction ==
=== Station reconstruction ===
The reconstruction of the station, carried out by Správa železnic (the Railway Administration), covers the section from the railway bridge over the Vltava to the last switch in the direction of Radotín, on lines 170, 171 and 173. Construction began in June 2023, with the main phase officially launched on 13 February 2024. The works are carried out under traffic with partial closures. The contractor is a consortium of Metrostav TBR, OHLA ŽS, Hochtief CZ and Elektrizace železnic Praha. The cost of the reconstruction was estimated at 5.1 billion CZK in 2026, mostly covered by European funds; the project is co-financed by the Connecting Europe Facility and supported by a loan from the European Investment Bank.

The project reduces the track layout of the station to four main tracks, three passing tracks and one dead-end track leading to the platforms, complemented by freight and sidings. The station will have four platforms: the reconstructed platform next to the station building (230 m (750 ft)), two practically newly built platforms (415 and 400 m (1,362 and 1,312 ft)) and one completely new platform (342 m (1,122 ft)/220 m (720 ft)). All platforms will be 550 mm (22 in) high, roofed, and connected by two extended underpasses with barrier-free access by escalators and lifts. The project includes 11.8 km (7.3 mi) of new track, 44 new switches, 8 lifts and 14 escalators, a new three-track bridge over Nádražní street and the connection of the line to Hostivice into the passenger station. The north wing of the station building was replaced by a new technological building.

Platforms 3 and 4 were scheduled to open in October 2026, and the reconstruction of the station is expected to be completed at the end of 2028. The reconstruction of the 1950s station building, also by Správa železnic, is planned for 2027–2029.

=== Footbridge ===
As a separate project, Správa železnic is building a new barrier-free footbridge across the station. It replaces the original steel footbridge from the early 20th century, which connected the station forecourt with the streets of Křížová and Radlická and was demolished during the reconstruction. The new footbridge is located about 150 metres (490 ft) further south, above the northern ends of the platforms, and will connect the forecourt, the platforms, the planned bus terminal and the new Smíchov City development west of the station. With an area of 1,752 square metres (18,860 sq ft), it will have four escalators, four lifts, waiting rooms and commercial spaces. Construction began in March 2024 and is expected to be completed in December 2028.

Both projects are coordinated with the city's Nádraží Smíchov transport terminal project (originally named Terminál Smíchov), led by the Prague Institute of Planning and Development and designed by A69 architekti, which includes a new bus terminal platform above the railway tracks.

Platforms 3 and 4 during the reconstruction

The station during the reconstruction

Platforms under construction
