= Muž z neznáma =

1939 film

- Directed by: Martin Frič
- Starring: Zdeněk Štěpánek
- Edited by: Jan Kohout
- Release date: 1939
- Running time: 80 minutes
- Country: Czechoslovakia
- Language: Czech

Muž z neznáma is a 1939 Czech drama film directed by Martin Frič.

== Cast ==
- Zdeněk Štěpánek
- Jiřina Štěpničková
- Zvonimir Rogoz
- Karel Cerný
- Karel Dostal
- Jaroslav Průcha
- Božena Šustrová
- František Kreuzmann
- Jarmila Holmová
- Vladimír Šmeral
- Jaroslav Vojta
