= Ferdinand Hart =

Czech actor (1893–1937)

Ferdinand Hart (28 October 1893 in Písek – 12 January 1937 in Prague) was a film actor from Czechoslovakia.

== Selected filmography ==
- The Hungarian Princess (1923)
- The Queen of the Baths (1926)
- You Walk So Softly (1928)
- Under Suspicion (1928)
- The Green Monocle (1929)
- His Majesty's Lieutenant (1929)
- Dreyfus (1930)
- The Citadel of Warsaw (1930)
- The Last Company (1930)
- The Stolen Face (1930)
- Wibbel the Tailor (1931)
- Danton (1931)
- Bobby Gets Going (1931)
- Panik in Chicago (1931)
- In the Employ of the Secret Service (1931)
- The Adventurer of Tunis (1931)
- Louise, Queen of Prussia (1931)
- 1914 (1931)
- That's All That Matters (1931)
- A Mad Idea (1932)
- Haunted People (1932)
- The Beautiful Adventure (1932)
- The Eleven Schill Officers (1932)
- Secret Agent (1932)
- The Flower of Hawaii (1933)
- The Happiness of Grinzing (1933)
- In the Little House Below Emauzy (1933)
- Life Is a Dog (1933)
- Long Live with Dearly Departed (1935)
- Le Golem (1936)
