= Cesta do hlubin študákovy duše =

1939 film by Martin Frič

Journey into the Depth of the Student's Soul
- Directed by: Martin Frič
- Written by: Martin Frič; Jan Kaplan; Jaroslav Žák
- Based on: Cesta do hlubin študákovy duše by Jaroslav Žák
- Starring: Jindřich Plachta
- Cinematography: Ferdinand Pečenka
- Edited by: Jan Kohout
- Production company: Elektafilm
- Distributed by: Elektafilm
- Release date: 31 October 1939
- Running time: 88 minutes
- Country: Protectorate of Bohemia and Moravia
- Language: Czech

Journey into the Depth of the Student's Soul (Czech: Cesta do hlubin študákovy duše) is a Czechoslovak comedy film directed by Martin Frič. It was released in 1939.

== Cast ==
- Jindřich Plachta - Matulka - Natural science teacher
- Jaroslav Marvan - Vobořil - Mathematics Teacher
- František Vnouček - Voříšek - Czech Language Teacher
- Miloš Nedbal - Šeda - French Teacher
- Jaroslav Průcha - Rabiška - Physics teacher
- František Kreuzmann - Tuřík
- Ludvík Veverka - Prof. Kahuda
- Vojta Novák - Dr. Vondrák
- Jarmila Holmová - Rázová - Geography Teacher
- Karel Veverka - Schoolmaster
- Ferenc Futurista - Janitor Petule
- Ladislav Pešek - Kulík
- R. A. Strejka - Peterka (as A. R. Strejka)
- Rudolf Hrušínský - Vanĕk
- František Filipovský - Mazánek
