= Nové Strašecí =

- Town
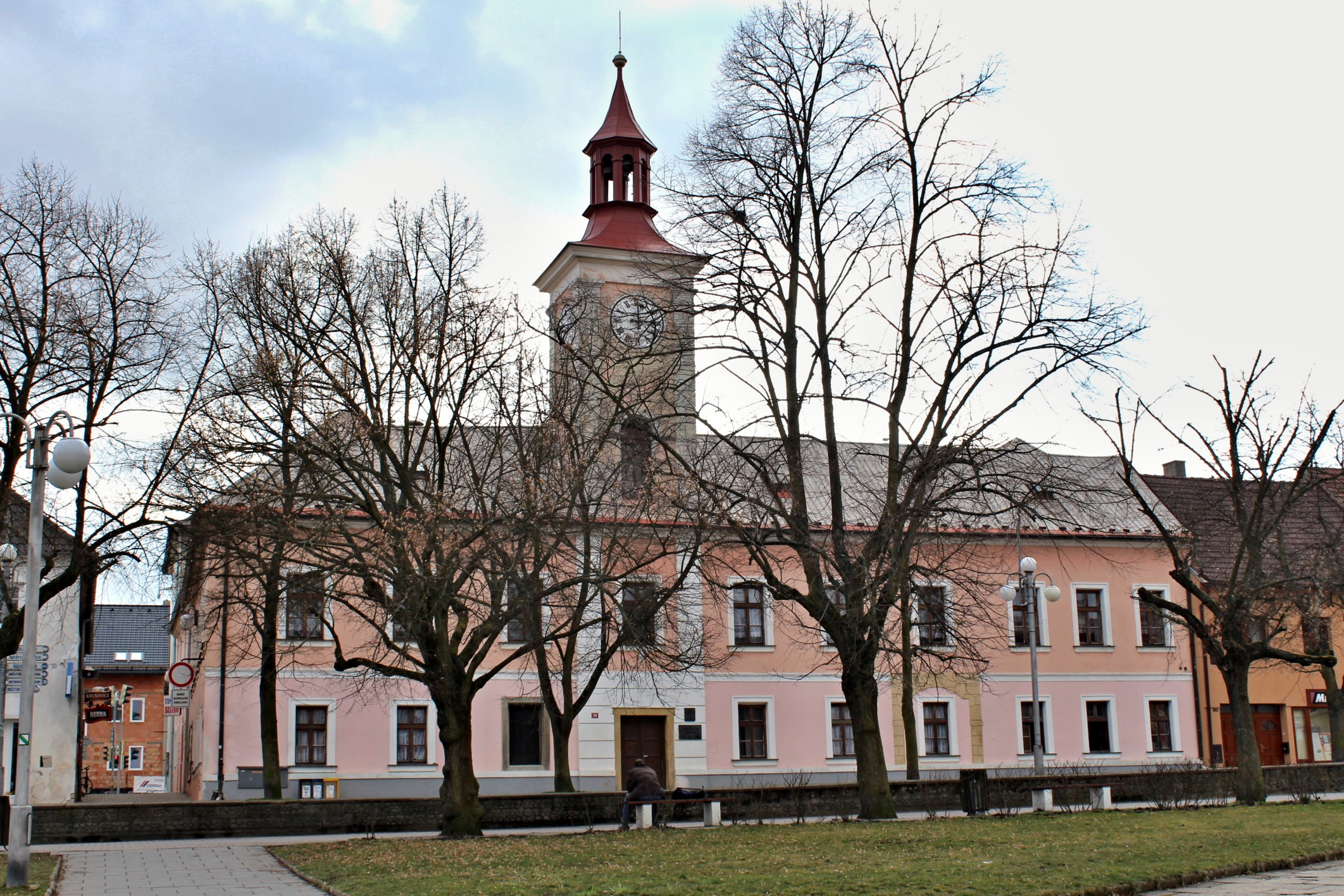
- Town hall

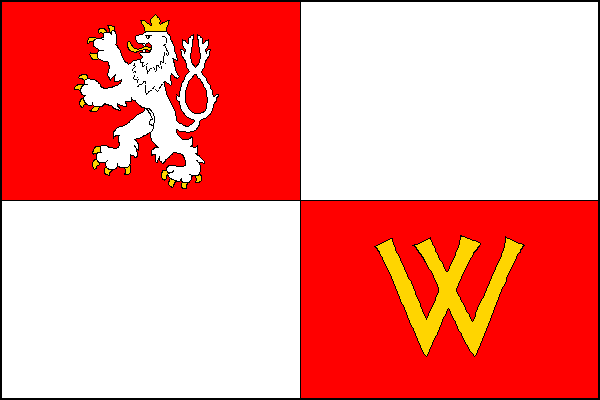
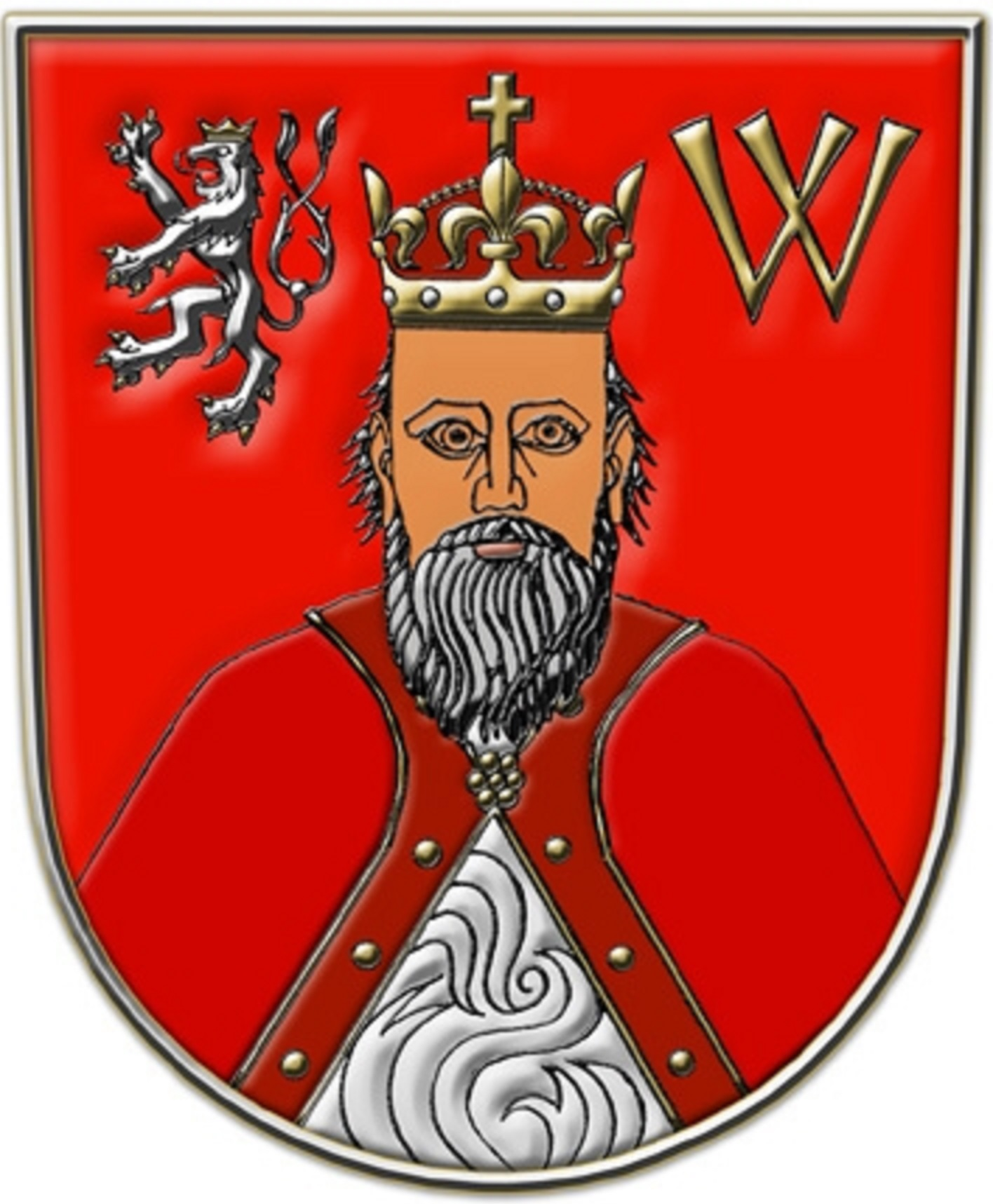
- Flag Coat of arms

- Location in the Czech Republic
- Coordinates: 50°9′12″N 13°53′57″E
- Country: Czech Republic
- Region: Central Bohemian
- District: Rakovník
- First mentioned: 1343

Government
  - Mayor: Karel Filip

Area
  - Total: 13.32 km^{2} (5.14 sq mi)
- Elevation: 470 m (1,540 ft)

Population (2026-01-01)
  - Total: 5,710
  - Density: 429/km^{2} (1,110/sq mi)
- Time zone: UTC+1 (CET)
  - Summer (DST): UTC+2 (CEST)
- Postal code: 271 01
- Website: www.novestraseci.cz

Nové Strašecí (Czech pronunciation: [ˈnovɛː ˈstraʃɛtsiː]) is a town in Rakovník District in the Central Bohemian Region of the Czech Republic. It has about 5,700 inhabitants.

== Administrative division ==
Nové Strašecí consists of two municipal parts (in brackets population according to the 2021 census):

- Nové Strašecí (5,488)
- Pecínov (218)

== Etymology ==
The name Strašecí is derived from the personal name Strašata, meaning "Strašata's (settlement)". The prefix nové ('new') is used from 1554, after the town was completely rebuilt as a result of a large fire.

== Geography ==
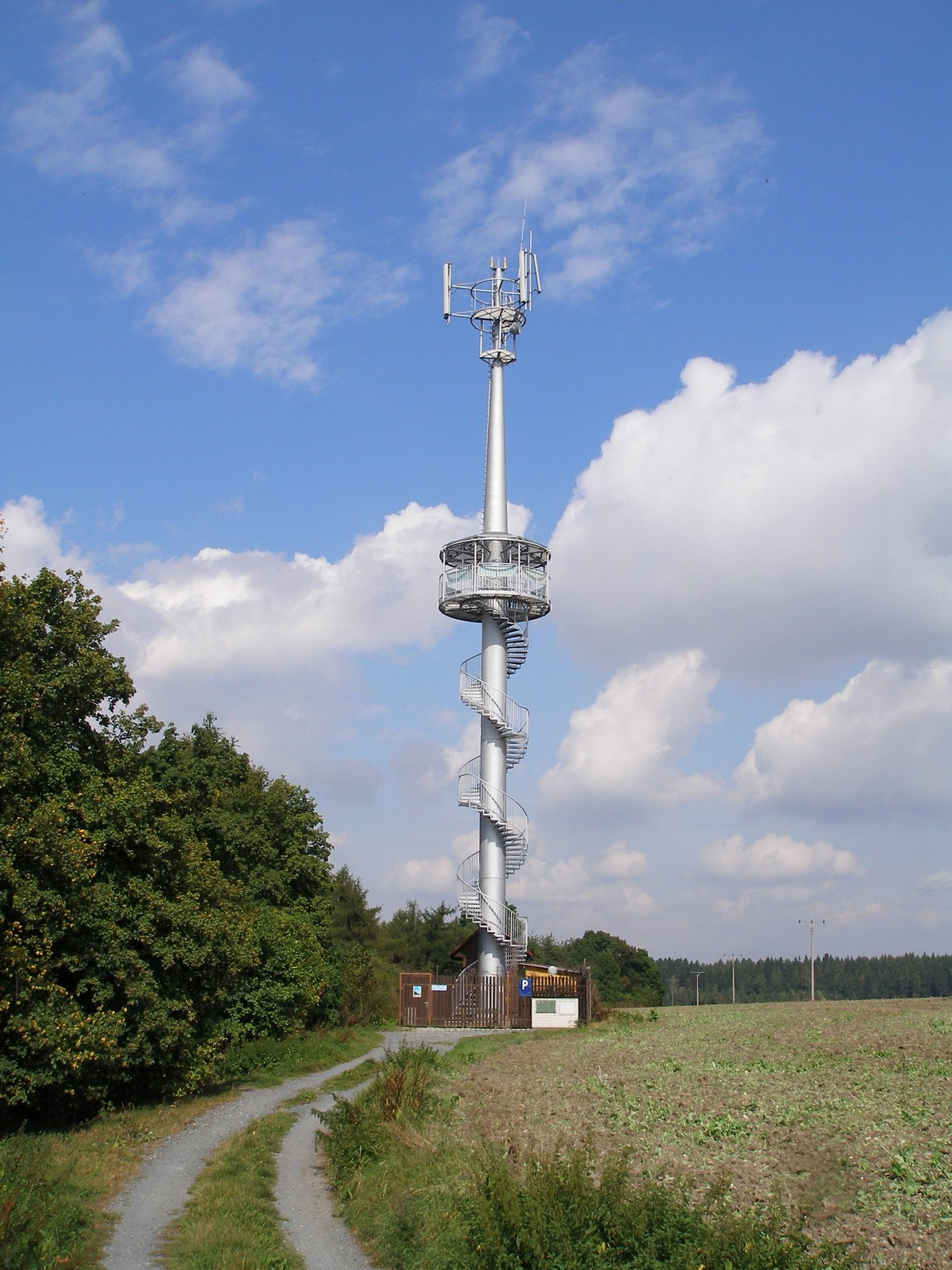
Observation tower on Mackova hora

Nové Strašecí is located about 13 kilometres (8 mi) northeast of Rakovník and 32 km (20 mi) west of Prague. It lies in the Džbán range. The highest point is the hill Mackova hora at 488 m (1,601 ft) above sea level. The Klíčava Stream flows through the municipal territory.

== History ==
The first written mention of Strašecí is from the period 1334–1343. Shortly after, the village was promoted to a market town. It was a part of the Křivoklát estate, owned by the royal chamber. During the 15th century, Strašecí lost its privileges, but in 1503, it was promoted to a town by King Vladislaus II. In 1553, the town was destroyed by large fire and entirely rebuilt.

Pecínov was first mentioned in 1556. The original part of the settlement disappeared after World War II due to fire clay mining and remained only the upper part of the settlement, which was established in the 1830s.

== Demographics ==
Historical population

Year	Pop.	±%
1869	3,169	—
1880	3,336	+5.3%
1890	3,256	−2.4%
1900	3,348	+2.8%
1910	3,693	+10.3%

Year	Pop.	±%
1921	3,257	−11.8%
1930	3,650	+12.1%
1950	2,895	−20.7%
1961	3,451	+19.2%
1970	3,294	−4.5%

Year	Pop.	±%
1980	4,449	+35.1%
1991	4,996	+12.3%
2001	5,054	+1.2%
2011	5,278	+4.4%
2021	5,706	+8.1%

Source: Censuses

== Transport ==
The D6 motorway (part of the European route E48) from Prague to Karlovy Vary runs through the town.

Nové Strašecí is located on the railway line Prague–Rakovník via Kladno.

== Sights ==
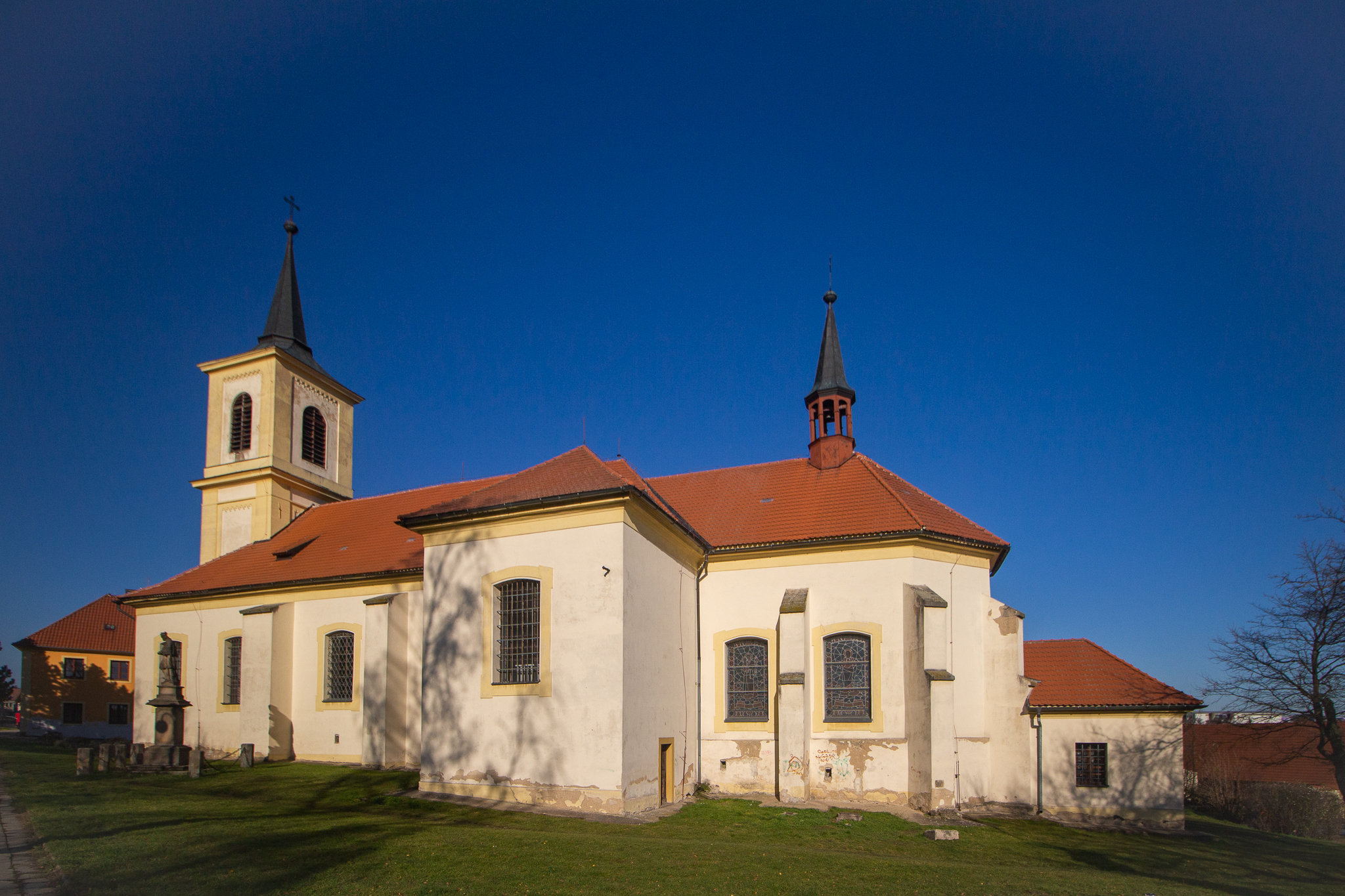
Church of the Assumption of the Virgin Mary

The main landmark of Nové Strašecí is the Church of the Assumption of the Virgin Mary. It was built in the Gothic style in the mid-14th century and modified in the Baroque and Neoclassical styles.

The town hall with a tower is of Renaissance origin. After the house was damaged by several fires, it was reconstructed to its present form in the 1830s.

On the hill Mackova hora is the eponymous observation tower. The tower is 36 m (118 ft) high and 98 stairs lead to the viewing platform at a height of 21 m (69 ft).

== Notable people ==
- Viktor Oliva (1861–1928), painter and illustrator
- Jaromír Spal (1916–1981), actor

== Twin towns – sister cities ==
Nové Strašecí is twinned with:

- Welden, Germany
