= Příklady táhnou =

- Directed by: Miroslav Cikán
- Starring: Růžena Nasková, Nataša Gollová, Stella Májová
- Release date: 1939
- Country: Czechoslovakia

Příklady táhnou (roughly translating to Examples drag), is a 1939 Czechoslovak comedy film, directed by Miroslav Cikán. It stars Růžena Nasková, Nataša Gollová, Stella Májová.
