= The Avalanche (1946 film) =

1946 film

- Directed by: Miroslav Cikán
- Written by: Miroslav Cikán; Jaroslav Mottl; Josef Trojan
- Produced by: Zdenek Reimann
- Starring: Otomar Korbelář; Marie Glázrová; Helena Bušová.
- Cinematography: Václav Hanus
- Edited by: Antonín Zelenka
- Music by: Milos Smatek; Josef Stelibský
- Production companies: Ceskoslovenská Filmová Spolecnost; Nationalfilm
- Distributed by: Státní Pujcovna Filmu
- Release date: 5 July 1946
- Running time: 83 minutes
- Country: Czechoslovakia

The Avalanche (Czech: Lavina) is a 1946 Czechoslovak crime drama film directed by Miroslav Cikán and starring Otomar Korbelář, Marie Glázrová and Helena Bušová. The film's sets were designed by the art director Jan Zázvorka.

== Cast ==
- Otomar Korbelář as JUDr. Karel Heran
- Marie Glázrová as Irena Malíková
- Helena Bušová as Olga
- Jaroslav Průcha as Ptácek, policejní inspektor
- Jaroslav Marvan as Dr. Urban, policejní rada
- Dana Medřická as Bendová, kvetinárka
- Jiří Dohnal as Pavel Benda
- Eduard Kohout as Dr. Malík
- Vladimír Repa as Lékar
- Antonín Holzinger as Lékar
- Frantisek Filipovský as Cerný, vrátný
- Nadezda Vladyková as Baruska, komorná
- Milos Nedbala s Státmí zástupce
- Otto Rubík as Strázník
- Jaroslav Seník as Predseda Soudu
- Eva Karelová as Osetrovatelka
- Viktor Nejedlý as Majitel továrny v likvidaci
- Josef Belský as Majitel továrny v likvidaci
- Miroslav Homola as Koncipient u herana
- Vítezslav Bocek as Hoteliér
- Martin Raus as Vrchní
- Josef Pehr as Host v hospode
- Vera Petáková as Sluzka
- Jaromír Spal as Mladík
- Eman Fiala as Opilec ve výcepu
- Marcela Sedlacková as Servírka
- Frantisek Paul as Václav, výcepní
- Jaroslav Orlický as Policejní úredník
- Václav Svec as Soudní sluha
- Antonín Zacpal as Arnost Pechar, obzalovaný
- Zora Plesingerová as Pokojská v horském hotelu
- Marie Hrdlicková as Manzelka Heranova Koncipienta
- Bolek Prchal as Vedoucí záchranné cety
- Karel Pavlík as Recepcní v horském hotelu

== Bibliography ==
- Černík, Jan. Český technický scénář 1945–1962. Palacký University Olomouc, 2021.
