= The Happiness of Grinzing =

1933 film

- Directed by: Otto Kanturek
- Written by: Franz Hoffermann; Eugen Thiele
- Starring: Iván Petrovich; Gretl Theimer; Alfred Gerasch
- Cinematography: Václav Vích
- Edited by: Marie Bourová
- Music by: Artur Guttmann; Emil Maiwald
- Production company: Oka Film
- Distributed by: Mondial Film (Austria)
- Release date: 27 October 1933
- Country: Czechoslovakia
- Language: German

The Happiness of Grinzing (German: Das Glück von Grinzing) is a 1933 Czech musical film directed by Otto Kanturek and starring Iván Petrovich, Gretl Theimer and Alfred Gerasch. It was produced in German and several of the cast and crew had recently left Germany following the Nazi takeover there. It was shot at the Barrandov Studios in Prague. The film's sets were designed by the art director Bohumil Heš. A separate Czech-language version, In the Little House Below Emauzy, was also shot at the same time. Such multiple-language versions were common during the early years of sound film before dubbing became more widespread. In German-speaking parts of Czechoslovakia it was released under the title Das Häuschen in Grinzing.

An operetta film, a popular genre during the decade, it is based on the 1911 operetta Alt-Wien which used melodies by Joseph Lanner (1801–1843). The title refers to Grinzing, once a small town outside Vienna and now a suburb of the city. It was one of a group of films produced during the period that set musical melodramas in the outskirts of the Austrian capital, generally appealing to the nostalgic tastes of audiences.

== Cast ==
- Iván Petrovich as Hans Martin, postilion
- Gretl Theimer as Liesl
- Marion Taal as Resi
- Maria Freene as Countess Lubetzky
- Alfred Gerasch as Count Lubetzky
- Ferdinand Hart as Anton Huber
- Ernst Wurmser as Franz Weigl - inn keeper
- Walter Taub as August Stiebitz
- Willy Bauer as Alois, servant
- Antonín Schmerzenreich as Count Willner
