= The Longing of Sherlock Holmes =

1972 film

- Directed by: Stepán Skalský
- Written by: Stepán Skalský
- Starring: Radovan Lukavský; Václav Voska
- Release date: 3 March 1972
- Country: Czechoslovakia

The Longing of Sherlock Holmes (Czech:Touha Sherlocka Holmese) is a 1972 Czechoslovak television film directed by Stepán Skalský and starring Radovan Lukavský, Václav Voska and Vlasta Fialová. The film also features Josef Kemr. Theodor Pištěk designed the costumes for the film.

== Plot ==
Desiring a change of pace, Sherlock Holmes decides for once to play criminal instead of crime-fighter. His attempt is eventually foiled by Watson.

== Production ==
Filmed on location in Prague, Liberec and Hrádek u Nechanic, it was based on an original screenplay by director Stepán Skalský.

== Cast ==
- Radovan Lukavský as Sherlock Holmes
- Václav Voska as Doctor Watson
- Vlasta Fialová as Abrahamová
- Marie Rosůlková as Lady Oberonová
- Josef Patočka as Sir Arthur Conan Doyle

== Bibliography ==
- Hardy, Phil. The BFI Companion to Crime. A&C Black, 1997.
