= Raging Barbora =

- Directed by: Miroslav Cikán
- Screenplay by: Bedřich Wermuth; Bedřich Šulc
- Story by: Quido E. Kujal
- Produced by: Josef Stein
- Starring: Antonie Nedošinská; Theodor Pištěk; Helena Bušová
- Cinematography: Otto Heller
- Edited by: Antonín Zelenka
- Music by: Joseph Kumok
- Production company: Projektor-Film
- Distributed by: Projektor-Film
- Release date: 12 April 1935
- Running time: 79 minutes
- Country: Czechoslovakia
- Language: Czech

Raging Barbora (Czech: Barbora řádí) is a 1935 Czechoslovak comedy film, directed by Miroslav Cikán. It stars Antonie Nedošinská, Theodor Pištěk, and Helena Bušová.

== Cast ==
- Antonie Nedošinská as Barbora Čápová
- Theodor Pištěk as Vojtěch Čáp
- Helena Bušová as Helena
- Máša Rodenová as Julča
- František Paul as Pavel Stehlík
- Fanda Mrázek as Julius Kopřiva
- Jindřich Plachta as Tailor Ludvík Mráz
- Ela Šárková as Dancer Boby
- Jára Kohout as Klandr
- František Kreuzmann as Mr. Fredoli / Waiter
- Karel Hradilák as Gigolo
