= Smíchov–Hostivice railway line =

Railway line in the Czech Republic

Coordinates: 50°2′29″N 14°23′27″E

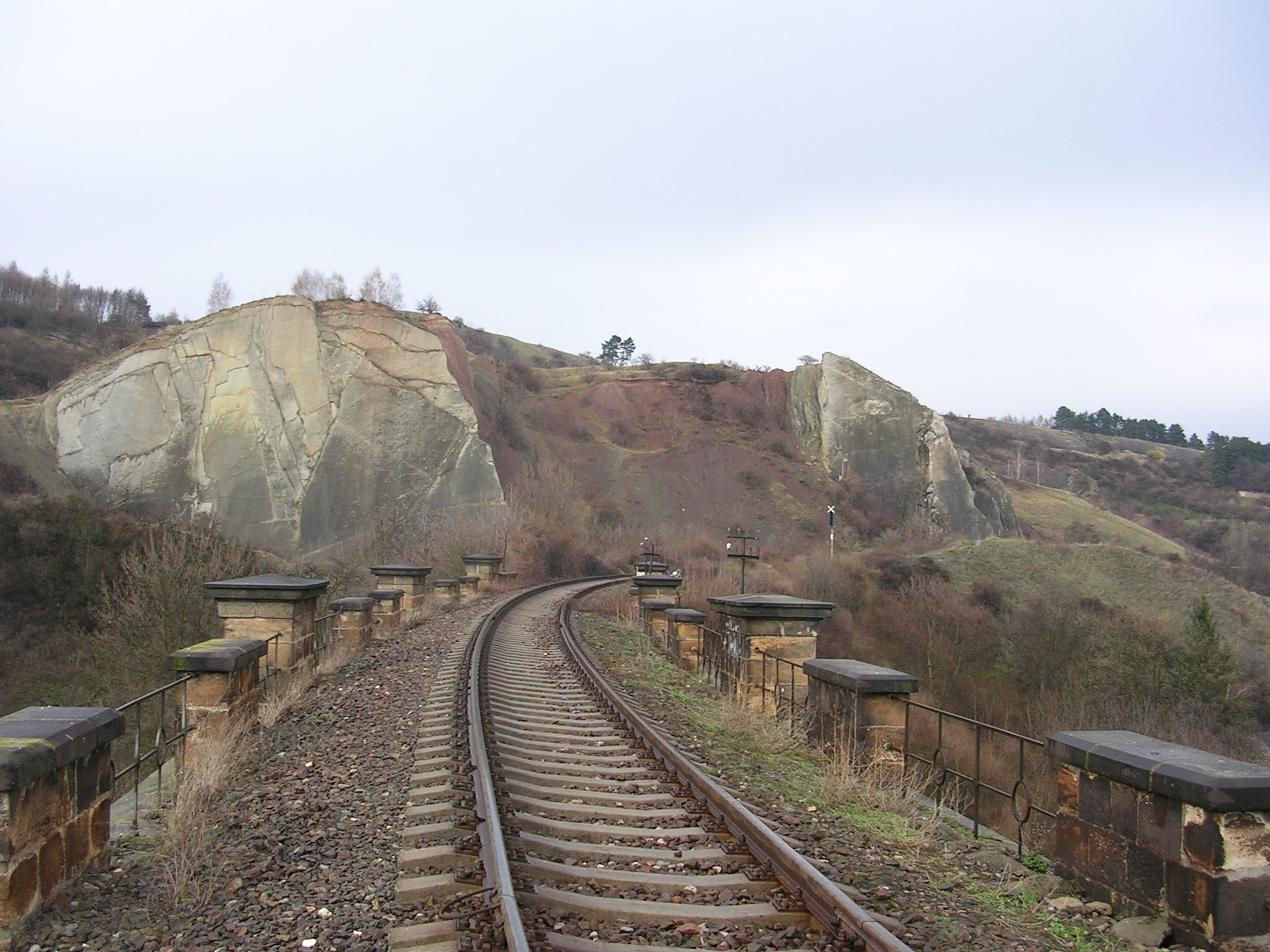
Hlubočepy viaduct

The Smíchov–Hostivice railway line (Czech: Železniční trať Praha-Smíchov – Hostivice) or Prague Semmering (Czech: Pražský Semmering, named by analogy with the Semmering railway in Austria) is a railway line in the Czech Republic. The line was built in 1868–1872 by the Buštěhrad Railway company as part of its connection between Prague and Chomutov.

The line was opened for cargo transport on 3 July 1872. It was used to transport coal and wood to Prague. Transport of passengers followed on 16 September 1872.

Today, it is part of line 122 from Praha hlavní nádraží to Rudná, as line S65 of the integrated Esko Prague system.

On the 9 km (5.6 mi) long section between Prague-Smíchov and Prague-Jinonice the line climbs an elevation difference of 90 metres (300 ft). There are two large viaducts, 20 metres (66 ft) and 22 metres (72 ft) high.
