= The Fool and the Princess =

1948 film by William C. Hammond

- Bruce Lester and Lesley Brook
- Directed by: William C. Hammond
- Screenplay by: William C. Hammond
- Produced by: Frank A. Hoare
- Starring: Bruce Lester; Lesley Brook; Adina Mandlová
- Edited by: Eric Hodges
- Music by: Max Saunders
- Production company: Merton Park
- Release date: 3 January 1949
- Running time: 50 minutes
- Country: United Kingdom
- Language: English

The Fool and the Princess is a 1948 British second feature ('B') drama film directed and written by William C. Hammond and starring Bruce Lester, Lesley Brook and Adina Mandlová. It was made at Merton Park Studios.

== Plot ==
Harry Granville is a young married officer at a Displaced Persons camp in Germany where he becomes infatuated with Russian refugee Moura, whom he believes is a princess. Returning home, he can think only of Moura, and he finds a reason to return to Germany to see her again. He discovers she is not a princess, and she declines his advances for the sake of his marriage.

== Cast ==
- Bruce Lester as Harry Granville
- Lesley Brook as Kate Granville
- Adina Mandlová as Moura
- Murray Matheson as Graham Ballard
- Irene Handl as Mrs Wicker
- Vi Kaley as Mrs Jenkins
- MacDonald Parke as Colonel Wingfield
- Millicent Russell as mother
- Sylvia Hacker as sister
- Gordon Phillott as jeweller
- Julian Henry as postman
- Paul Erickson as U.S. orderly
- Richard Nelson as U.S. orderly

== Reception ==
The Monthly Film Bulletin wrote: "This is a simple and hackneyed story which, with added details and complications, provides slow-moving and uninteresting entertainment. The acting is lifeless and does not appear natural, but possibly a better script might have helped. The suburban home life is natural enough, and the D.P. camp scenes are true to life; the photography and lighting are good, but there is no relief from thc main theme of the story."

Kine Weekly wrote: "A topical domestic drama, quietly dedicated to young married officers who have become a little too big for their breeches. Quite well acted and directed, it contains more truth than many features twice its length and Is certain to appeal to women. ... Bruce Lester convinces as the inflated and susceptible Harry, Lesley Brooks, one of the screen's most neglected artists, makes an appealing Kate, and Adina Mandlova has distinct possibilities as Moura."

Picturegoer wrote: "Another of those returned-officer stories. It's an unpretentious plot, but is quite well acted and directed."

Picture Show wrote: "Unpretentious but sincerely acted domestic drama."

In British Sound Films: The Studio Years 1928–1959 David Quinlan rated the film as "average", writing: "Well-acted, intelligent comedy romance, a shade too unambitious."
