= Sign of the Anchor =

1947 film

- Directed by: František Čáp
- Written by: František Čáp; Jan Drda; Frank Tetauer
- Starring: Hana Vítová; Zdeňka Baldová; Vlasta Fabianová
- Cinematography: Ferdinand Pečenka
- Edited by: Jan Kohout
- Music by: Jiří Srnka
- Production company: Československá filmová společnost
- Distributed by: Státní půjčovna filmů
- Release date: October 31, 1947
- Running time: 99 minutes
- Country: Czechoslovakia
- Language: Czech

Sign of the Anchor (Czech:Znamení kotvy) is a 1947 Czech drama film directed by František Čáp and starring Hana Vítová, Zdeňka Baldová and Vlasta Fabianová.

The film's art direction was by Štěpán Kopecký.

== Cast ==
- Hana Vítová as Pavla Marková aka Miss Camilla
- Zdeňka Baldová as Pavla's mother
- Vlasta Fabianová as Prostitute Černá Fanka
- Eduard Kohout as Maestro Lascari
- Zdeněk Štěpánek as Captain Troska
- Július Pántik as Wheelsman Franta Hojdar
- Ladislav H. Struna as Wheelsman Hojdar
- Jarmila Smejkalová as Seamstress Růža
- Vladimír Salač as Cabin boy Lojza Brůha
- Josef Maršálek as Greaser Toník Truneček
- Jan W. Speerger as Boatman
- Jaroslav Zrotal as Vojta
- Karel Effa as Cabin boy Pobříslo
- Ota Motyčka as Innkeeper Krůta
- František Dibarbora as Customs officer
