= The Great Dam (film) =

- Directed by: Jan Alfréd Holman
- Written by: Jan Alfréd Holman; K.M. Walló
- Starring: František Vnouček; Karel Hradilák; Adina Mandlová
- Cinematography: Václav Hanus; Jaroslav Tuzar
- Edited by: Jan Kohout
- Music by: Jiří Srnka
- Production company: Lloydfilm
- Distributed by: Lloydfilm
- Release date: 16 October 1942
- Countries: Protectorate of Bohemia and Moravia
- Language: Czech

The Great Dam (Czech: Velká přehrada) is a 1942 Czech drama film directed by Jan Alfréd Holman and starring František Vnouček, Karel Hradilák and Adina Mandlová.

The film's sets were designed by the art director Bohumil Hes. Shooting took place in Prague, including on the Vltava River.

== Main cast ==
- František Vnouček as Jan Hejtmánek
- Karel Hradilák as Leo Berka
- Adina Mandlová as Irena Berková
- Josef Gruss as Fred Dokoupil
- Nataša Gollová as Učitelka Marína
- Jaroslav Průcha as Betonář Barták
- Miroslav Svoboda as Projektant Michal
- Martin Raus as Projektant Karel
- Eva Prchlíková as Kavanová
- Jarmila Švábíková as Elsa

== Bibliography ==
- Hana Kubátová & Jan Láníček. The Jew in Czech and Slovak Imagination, 1938-89: Antisemitism, the Holocaust, and Zionism. BRILL, 2018.
