= Forbidden Love (1938 film) =

- Directed by: Miroslav Cikán
- Starring: Helena Bušová, Frantisek Cerný, and Carl Lamac.
- Production company: Reiter Film
- Release date: 1938
- Running time: 92 minute
- Country: Czechoslovakia

Forbidden Love (Milování zakázáno) is a 1938 Czechoslovak comedy film, directed by Miroslav Cikán. It stars Helena Bušová, Frantisek Cerný, and Carl Lamac.
