= Lojzička =

- Directed by: Miroslav Cikán
- Screenplay by: Zet Molas
- Story by: Jiří Balda, Jára Kohout
- Starring: Karel Hašler, Markéta Krausová, and Helena Bušová.
- Cinematography: Jan Roth
- Edited by: Antonín Zelenka
- Music by: Jarda Jankovec and Erno Kostal
- Production company: Gloria
- Release date: 1936
- Running time: 94 minutes
- Country: Czechoslovakia

Lojzička is a 1936 Czechoslovak comedy film, directed by Miroslav Cikán. It stars Karel Hašler, Markéta Krausová, and Helena Bušová.

== Cast ==
- Jarmila Beránková as Aloisie Strnadová alias Lojzička
- Jára Kohout as Jikra, listonos
- Božena Svobodová as Mlynárka
- Zita Kabátová as Karla
- Vlasta Hrubá as Pavla
- Jiří Dohnal as Jean Poulard
- Antonín Novotný as Karel Drozd
- Míla Svoboda as Ing. Cermák
- Svetla Svozilová as Rita
- Helena Bušová as Barca
- Jaroslav Marvan as Sedlák
