= Romance from the Tatra Mountains =

- Directed by: Josef Rovenský
- Written by: Hans Dorasil; Pavel Ludikar; Josef Rovenský
- Starring: Pavel Ludikar; Arno Velecký; Jiřina Štěpničková
- Cinematography: Karel Degl
- Edited by: Jan Kohout
- Music by: Josef Dobeš
- Production company: Dori-film
- Distributed by: Elekta
- Release date: 1 April 1935
- Running time: 81 min
- Country: Czechoslovakia
- Languages: Czech; German

Romance from the Tatra Mountains (Czech: Tatranská romance) is a 1934 Czech romance drama film directed by Josef Rovenský. The film competed at 1935 Venice Film Festival. The film was also dubbed to German and released under the title Das Lied der Heimat in 1935.

== Cast ==
- Pavel Ludikar as Blacksmith Pavel
- Arno Velecký as Janko, Pavel's son
- Jiřina Štěpničková as Blacksmith's fosterdaughter Anuška
- Markéta Krausová as Soňa Varenová
- Antonín Soukup as Farmer Jura
- Světla Svozilová as Zuzka
