= The Little Pet =

1934 film

- Directed by: Martin Frič
- Written by: Martin Frič; Hugo Haas
- Starring: Hugo Haas
- Cinematography: Václav Vích
- Edited by: Martin Frič
- Music by: Pavel Haas
- Release date: 1934
- Running time: 80 minutes
- Country: Czechoslovakia
- Language: Czech

The Little Pet (Czech: Mazlíček) is a 1934 Czech comedy film directed by Martin Frič.

== Cast ==
- Hugo Haas as Dr. Alois Pech, a prison librarian
- Adina Mandlová as Marcella Johnová
- František Kreuzmann as Pospísil
- Helena Bušová
- Jan Marek as Beggar
- Jaroslav Marvan
- Stanislav Neumann
- Antonín Novotný
- Ema Pechová
- Václav Trégl
- Rudolf Žák as Card-player
