= Eduard Kohout =

Czech actor (1889–1976)

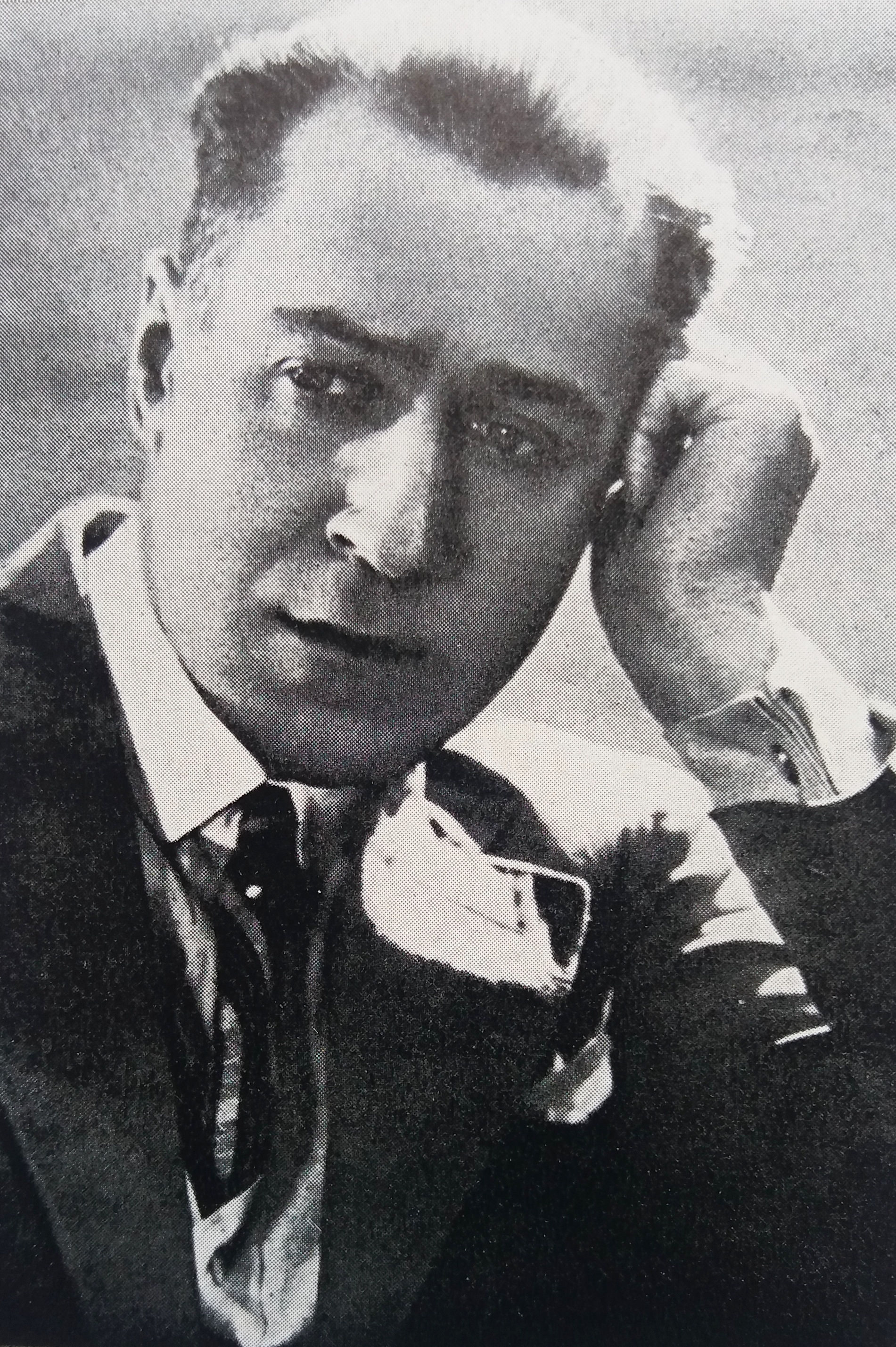
- Kohout in c. 1931
- Born: František Eduard Kohout; 6 March 1889; České Budějovice, Bohemia, Austria-Hungary
- Died: 25 October 1976 (aged 87); Prague, Czechoslovakia
- Resting place: Slavín
- Occupation: Actor
- Years active: 1913–1974 (film)

Signature
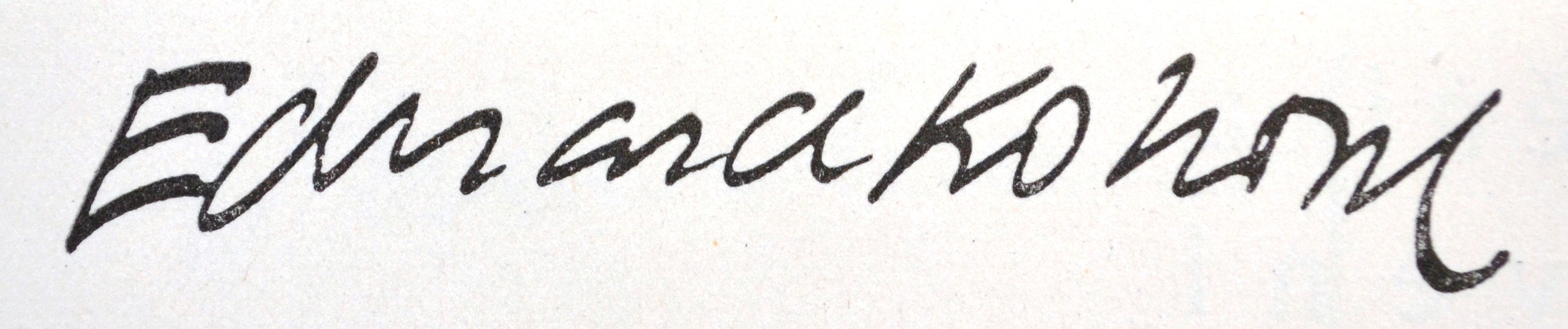

František Eduard Kohout (6 March 1889 – 25 October 1976) was a Czech actor. He played in theatre, film and television.

== Selected filmography ==
- Battalion (1937)
- The Magic House (1939)
- Nocturnal Butterfly (1941)
- The Dancer (1943)
- Happy Journey (1943)
- The Avalanche (1946)
- Sign of the Anchor (1947)
- Bohemian Rapture (1947)
- Jan Hus (1954)
- The King of Kings (1963)
- The Cremator (1969)
