= A Big Case =

1946 film

- Directed by: Václav Kubásek; Josef Mach
- Written by: Václav Kubásek
- Produced by: Otakar Sedláček
- Starring: Jaroslav Průcha; Vítězslav Boček; Helena Busová
- Cinematography: Julius Vegricht
- Edited by: Josef Dobřichovský
- Music by: Julius Kalas
- Release date: 20 December 1946
- Running time: 80 minutes
- Country: Czechoslovakia
- Language: Czech

A Big Case (Czech: Velký případ) is a 1946 Czech comedy film directed by Václav Kubásek and Josef Mach and starring Jaroslav Průcha, Vítězslav Boček and Helena Busová. The film's sets were designed by the art director Alois Mecera.

== Synopsis ==
In a small town, towards the end of the Occupation of Czechoslovakia (1938–1945), a patriotic Czech miller disguises himself in the uniform of the local German commander who he strongly resembles, causing confusion amongst the Wehrmacht forces and their Czech collaborators.

== Cast ==
- Jaroslav Průcha as miller
- Vítězslav Boček as Hermann Hähne
- Bedřich Vrbský as forester
- Helena Busová as wine bar owner
- Dagmar Frýbortová as the miller's daughter
- Vladimír Řepa as mayor
- Bohuš Záhorský as station master
- František Filipovský as editor
- Rudolf Deyl as veterinarian
- Bolek Prchal as farmer
- Stanislav Neumann as watchmaker
- Martin Raus as Wohryzka
- Václav Švorc as police officer
- Vladimír Hlavatý as Mítonoha
- Rudolf Morávek as Vrtátko
- František Paul as Volkssturm leader
- Alois Dvorský as savings bank cashier
- Gabriel Hart as Prof. Weissenberger
- Zita Bergerová as Kraus's wife
- Jan Fifka as Němec
- Jindra Hermanová as Gossip
- Karolína Vávrová as old woman with a clock
