= Helena Bušová =

Czech actress

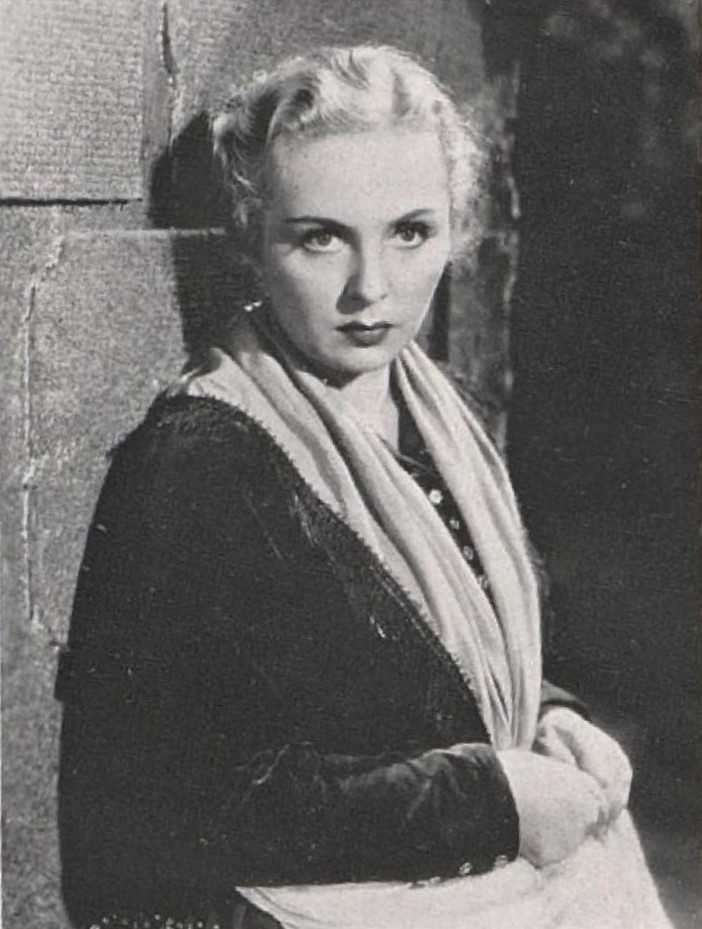
- Born: 21 October 1914; Prague, Austria-Hungary
- Died: 28 November 1986 (aged 72); Winnipeg, Manitoba, Canada
- Occupation: Actress
- Years active: 1932–1948

Helena Bušová (born Helena Buschová; 21 October 1914 – 28 November 1986) was a Czech actress. She appeared in more than thirty films from 1932 to 1948.

In 1948 she emigrated to London and in 1957 she moved with her family to Canada.

== Selected filmography ==
Year	Title	Role	Notes
1934	The Little Pet		
1934	Workers, Let's Go		
1935	Raging Barbora		
1935	Král ulice		
1936	Lojzička	Barča	
1937	Děvče za výkladem		
1937	Battalion		
1937	Blackmailer		
1938	Forbidden Love		
1942	Ryba na suchu		
1946	The Avalanche		
1946	A Big Case		
