= Nataša Gollová =

Czech actress (1912–1988)

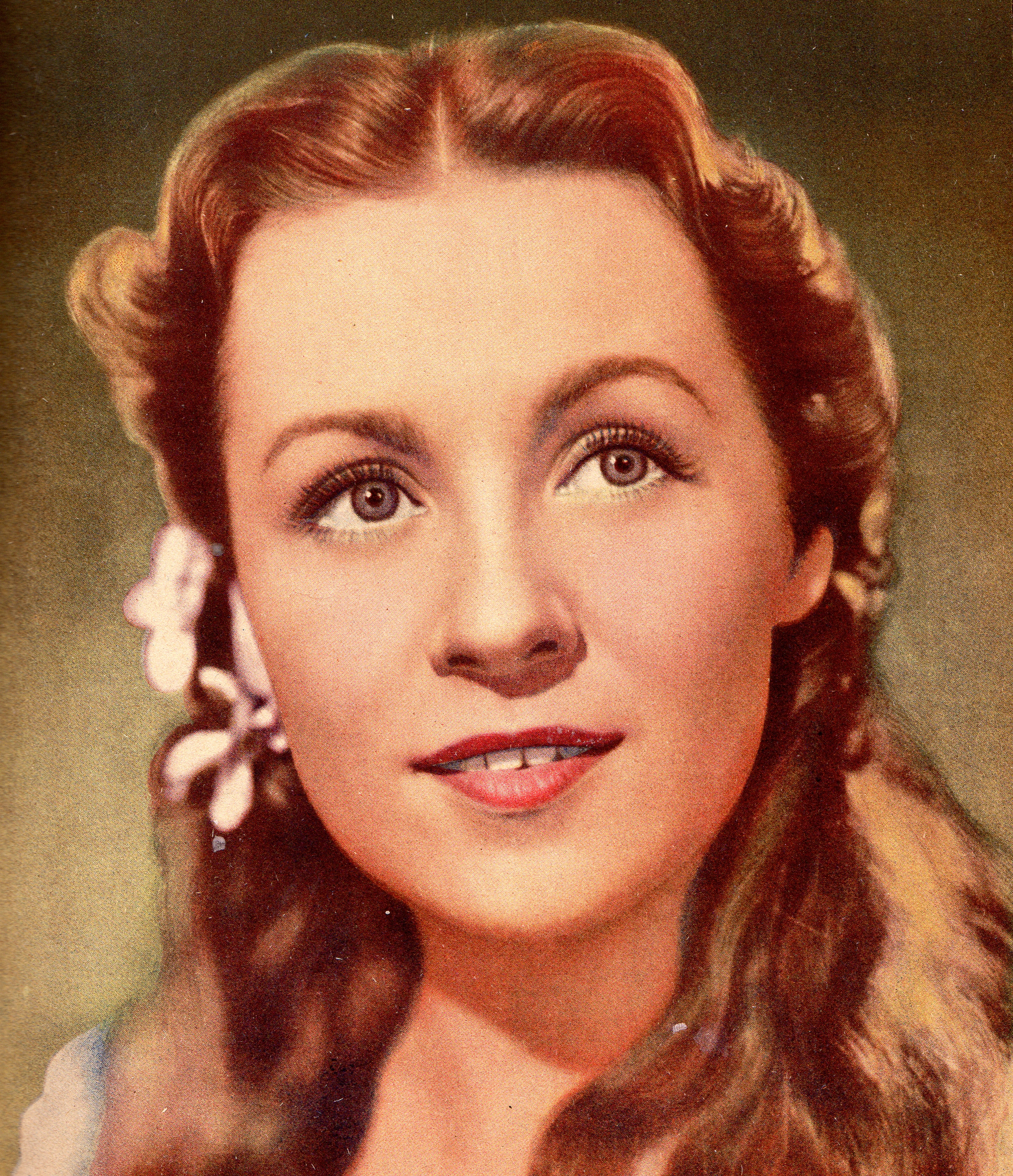
- Gollová in 1940
- Born: 27 February 1912; Brno, Moravia, Austria-Hungary
- Died: 29 October 1988 (aged 76); Prague, Czechoslovakia
- Occupation: Actress
- Years active: 1930–1984
- Spouse: Karel Konstantin (m. 1947; died 1961)

Nataša Gollová (27 February 1912 – 29 October 1988) was a Czech film and stage actress.

== Life ==
She was born Nataša Hodáčová in Brno, Moravia, Austria-Hungary (now the Czech Republic) on 27 February 1912. Her father was a politician František Xaver Hodáč. She chose her art name after her grandfather, historian Jaroslav Goll. Since her teenage years she studied dance and acting and was part of a dance company. She spoke English, German, French and Russian. In 1932 she met a poet Tristan Tzara in Paris during her ballet company tour. They briefly dated, but Gollová decided to go back to Czechoslovakia. They remained good friends until his death in 1963.

Her first acting part was in the film The Ideal Schoolmaster in 1932. She acted in theatres in Olomouc and Bratislava. From 1935 to 1944 she was part of the Vinohrady Theatre ensemble, playing dramatic roles. Her breakout movie role came in 1939 in Eva tropí hlouposti. She established herself as a leading comedy actress in Czechoslovakia. In 1941 she dated a Nazi-appointed producer to Barrandov Studios Willy Söhnel. At the end of the war she dated Austrian actor O. W. Fischer. These relationships were unforgivable to the Czechoslovak audience and as a result she wasn't cast in any films until 1950. After the war she volunteered at Theresienstadt, where she got infected with typhus. In 1947 she joined the theatre in České Budějovice. There she married a theatre director Karel Konstantin. Her husband was an alcoholic and at this time Gollová also started to drink.

In 1951 she got cast in The Emperor and the Golem thanks to Jan Werich. She returned to Prague theatres Divadlo na Fidlovačce (1952–1953) and Divadlo ABC (1955–1962). Her husband's death in 1961 made her problems with alcohol worse. She then mainly appeared in supporting roles and television movies until her retirement in 1984. She died in 1988 in Prague and is buried in a family grave at Vyšehrad Cemetery.

== Selected filmography ==
- The Ideal Schoolmaster (1932)
- Studujeme za školou (1939)
- Příklady táhnou (1939)
- Lízino štěstí (1939)
- Christian (1939)
- Eva tropí hlouposti (1939)
- Dívka v modrém (1939)
- The Catacombs (1940)
- May Fairy Tale (1940)
- A Charming Man (1941)
- The Blue Star Hotel (1941)
- The Great Dam (1942)
- Enchanted (1942)
- Bláhový sen (1943)
- Happy Journey (1943)
- Come Back to Me (1944)
- The Emperor and the Golem (1951)
- The Phantom of Morrisville (1966)
