= Jaromír Spal =

Czech actor

- Born: 18 July 1916; Nové Strašecí, Bohemia, Austria-Hungary
- Died: 22 March 1981 (aged 64); Prague, Czechoslovakia
- Other name: František Kohout
- Occupation: Actor
- Years active: 1943–1980

Jaromír Spal (18 July 1916 – 22 March 1981) was a Czech film actor.

== Selected filmography ==
- The Avalanche (1946)
- Bohemian Rapture (1947)
- Silent Barricade (1949)
