= Václav Voska =

Czech actor

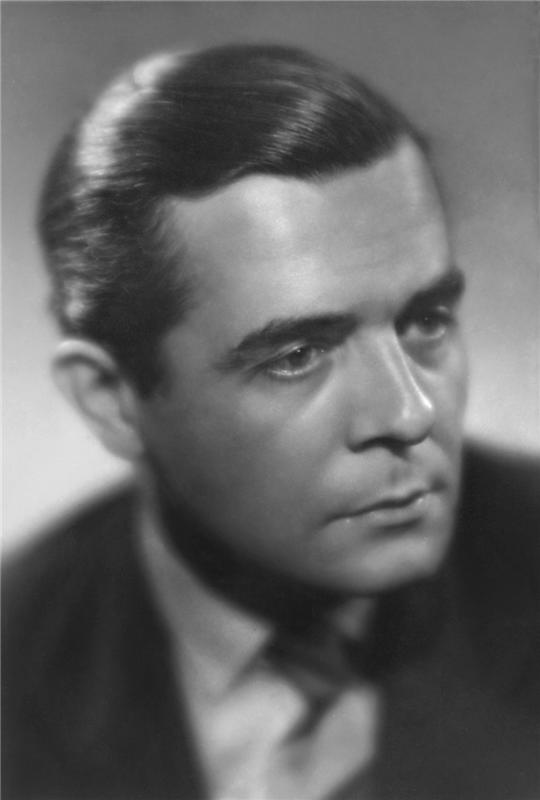
- Photo from the Archive of the National Theatre
- Born: 21 October 1918; Prague, Bohemia, Austria-Hungary
- Died: 20 August 1982 (aged 63); Valašské Meziříčí, Czechoslovakia
- Occupation: Actor
- Years active: 1940–1982

Václav Voska (21 October 1918 – 20 August 1982) was a Czech film actor.

== Selected filmography ==
- The Dancer (1943)
- Bohemian Rapture (1947)
- Jan Žižka (1955)
- Against All (1956)
- Mord in Frankfurt (1968, TV film)
- The Longing of Sherlock Holmes (1972)
- Panna a netvor (1978)
