= Silent Barricade =

1949 film

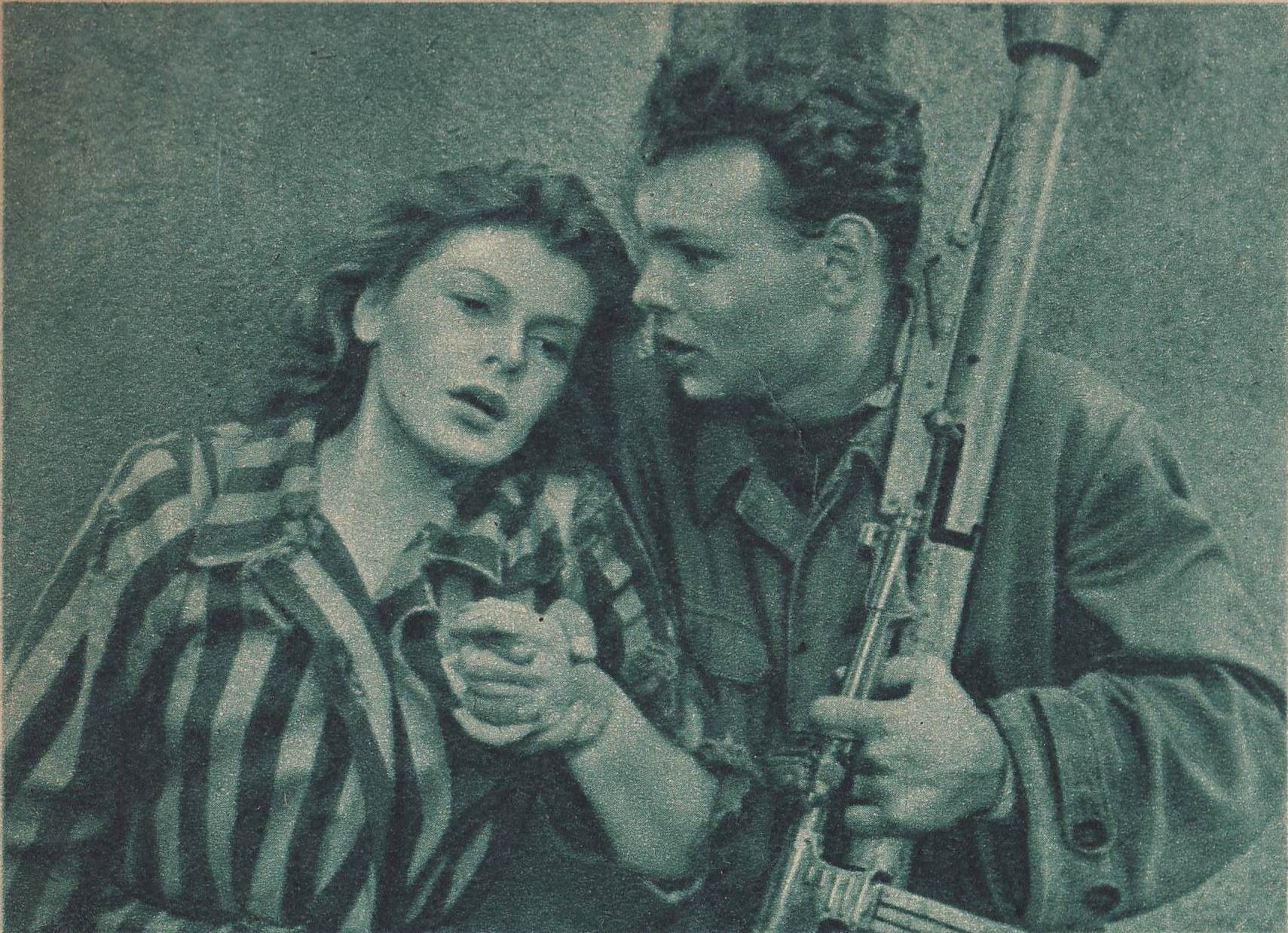
- Directed by: Otakar Vávra
- Written by: Jan Drda; Otakar Vávra
- Starring: Jaroslav Průcha
- Cinematography: Václav Huňka
- Edited by: Antonín Zelenka
- Music by: Jiří Srnka
- Release date: 6 May 1949
- Running time: 113 minutes
- Country: Czechoslovakia
- Language: Czech

Silent Barricade (Czech: Němá barikáda) is a 1949 Czechoslovak war film about the Prague uprising at the end of World War II, directed by Otakar Vávra.

== Cast ==
- Jaroslav Průcha as Hošek
- Barbara Drapińska as Halina
- Jaroslav Marvan as strážník Brůček
- Vladimír Šmeral as František Kroupa
- Marie Vášová as Nedvědová
- Robert Vrchota as Sergeant
- Jiří Plachý as Uhlíř
- Jaromír Spal as Tramway Conductor
- Jaroslav Zrotal as Tramway Driver
- Eva Karelová as Tramway Conductor
- Jaroslava Panenková as Hošková
