= Antonín Novotný (actor) =

Czech film actor

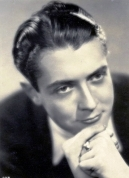
- Novotný in 1935
- Born: 15 March 191315 March 1913; Tábor, Austria-Hungary
- Died: 24 April 2005 (aged 92); Rödental, Bavaria, Germany
- Occupation: Actor
- Years active: 1930–1941 (film)

Antonín Novotný (15 March 1913 – 24 April 2005) was a Czech film actor. He starred in more than twenty Czech films during the 1930s and the early years of the German occupation. He went to Hollywood in 1937 to be tested by Metro-Goldwyn-Mayer who were interested in developing him as a new star, but returned to Prague without making any films there. After his retirement from acting he became a researcher into vitreous enamel.

== Selected filmography ==
- The Mystery of the Blue Room (1933)
- In the Little House Below Emauzy (1933)
- The Little Pet (1934)
- The Last Man (1934)
- Lojzička (1936)
- Vzdusné torpédo 48 (1937)
- The Catacombs (1940)
- The Blue Star Hotel (1941)

== Bibliography ==
- Bartošek, Luboš. Náš film: kapitoly z dějin, 1896-1945. Mladá fronta, 1985. p. 393.
- Goble, Alan. The Complete Index to Literary Sources in Film. Walter de Gruyter, 1999. p. 274.
