= Bohemian Rapture =

1947 Czech historical drama film

- Directed by: Václav Krška
- Written by: Václav Krška
- Starring: Jaromír Spal; Václav Voska; Karel Dostal
- Cinematography: Ferdinand Pečenka
- Edited by: Jan Kohout
- Music by: Frantisek Škvor
- Production company: Československá filmová společnost
- Distributed by: Státní půjčovna filmů
- Release date: 16 January 1947
- Running time: 104 minutes
- Country: Czechoslovakia
- Language: Czech

Bohemian Rapture or The Violin and the Dream (Czech: Housle a sen) is a 1947 Czech historical drama film directed by Václav Krška and starring Jaromír Spal, Václav Voska and Karel Dostal. The film portrays the life of the Czech violinist Josef Slavík, a contemporary of Frédéric Chopin, and a rival of Niccolò Paganini.

== Cast ==
- Jaromír Spal as Josef Slavík
- Václav Voska as Frédéric Chopin
- Karel Dostal as Nicolo Paganini
- Vlasta Fabianová as Anna Zásmucká
- Libuše Zemková as Henrietta Astfeldová
- Jiřina Krejčová as Magdalenka
- Marie Vášová as The Unknown Woman
- Eduard Kohout as Count Pavel Adam Lažanský,
- Vladimír Řepa as Teacher W. W. Würfel
- František Smolík as Father Quardián
- Jarmila Švabíková as Constance Bayerová
- Jiří Steimar as Baron Astfeld
- Jan W. Speerger as Thug
- Zvonimir Rogoz as Conductor
- Karel Kalista as General Kučera

== Release ==
The film premiered on 31 January 1947. In 1948 the film was released in the United States by the USSR distributor Artkino. This release is sometimes treated as a separate film, but is simply an English-subtitled version of the Czech original. The New York Times review of the film was negative, criticising it as "an unusual but decidedly confusing and unrewarding offering" and attacking in particular its use of disjointed flashback sequences.

== Bibliography ==
- The Most Important Art: Eastern European Film After 1945. University of California Press, 1977.
