= František Kreuzmann =

Czech actor

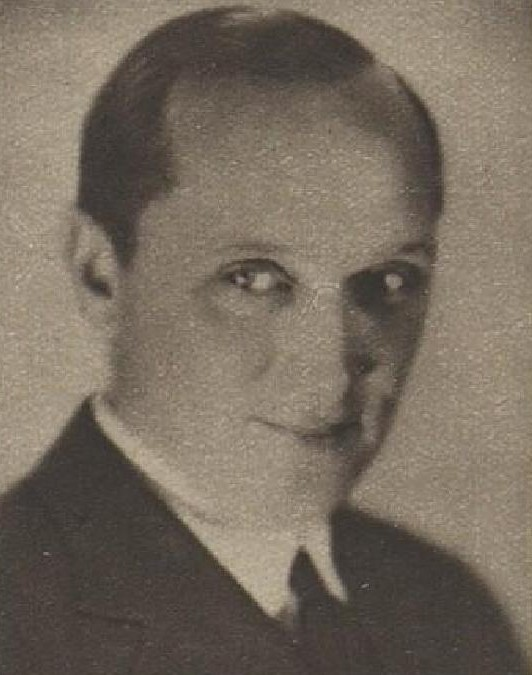
- František Kreuzmann
- Born: 11 October 1895; Pilsen, Bohemia, Austria-Hungary (now Plzeň, Czech Republic)
- Died: 28 December 1960 (aged 65); Prague, Czechoslovakia (now Czech Republic)
- Occupation: Actor
- Years active: 1927–1960

František Kreuzmann (11 October 1895 – 28 December 1960) was a Czech actor. He appeared in more than 100 films between 1927 and 1960.

== Selected filmography ==
- Anton Spelec, Sharp-Shooter (1932)
- Pobočník Jeho Výsosti (1933)
- The Little Pet (1934)
- Long Live with Dearly Departed (1935)
- Raging Barbora (1935)
- Father Vojtech (1936)
- Virginity (1937)
- Krok do tmy (1937)
- Battalion (1937)
- The Lantern (1938)
- The Merry Wives (1938)
- A Foolish Girl (1938)
- Cesta do hlubin študákovy duše (1939)
- Muž z neznáma (1939)
- Jiný vzduch (1939)
- Second Tour (1939)
- The Magic House (1939)
- Dívka v modrém (1940)
- Ladies in Waiting (1940)
- In the Still of the Night (1941)
- Happy Journey (1943)
- Veselá bída (1944)
- The Girl from Beskydy Mountains (1944)
- Rozina, the Love Child (1945)
- The Adventurous Bachelor (1946)
- Leave It to Me (1955)
- Suburban Romance (1958)
