= Jan Zázvorka =

Czech art director

- Born: 2 May 1914; Prague, Austria-Hungary
- Died: 14 January 1991 (aged 76); Prague, Czechoslovakia
- Occupation: Art director
- Years active: 1936–1986 (film)

Jan Zázvorka (2 May 1914 – 14 January 1991) was a Czech architect and art director. He designed the film sets for more than a hundred productions in a career that spanned many decades. As an architect he worked on the National Monument at Vítkov and Praha-Smíchov railway station.

== Selected filmography ==
- Blackmailer (1937)
- Arthur and Leontine (1940)
- Ladies in Waiting (1940)
- The Dancer (1943)
- Fourteen at the Table (1943)
- The Avalanche (1946)
- Nobody Knows Anything (1947)
