= The Magic House (film) =

1939 film

- Theatrical release poster
- Directed by: Otakar Vávra
- Written by: Otakar Vávra
- Based on: Kouzelný dům by K. J. Beneš
- Starring: Adina Mandlová; Růžena Nasková
- Cinematography: Jan Roth
- Edited by: Antonín Zelenka
- Music by: František Škvor
- Production company: Elektafilm
- Distributed by: Elektafilm
- Release date: 29 November 1939
- Running time: 109 minutes
- Country: Czechoslovakia
- Language: Czech

The Magic House (Czech: Kouzelný dům) is a 1939 Czechoslovak drama film directed by Otakar Vávra.

== Cast ==
- Adina Mandlová as Marie Ungrová
- Růžena Nasková as Vilemína Balvínová
- Leopolda Dostalová as Aunt Hedvika Balvínová
- Terezie Brzková as Aunt Anna Balvínová
- Zdeněk Štěpánek as Martin Balvín
- Eduard Kohout as Vilém Balvín
- Svetla Svozilová as Rosa
- František Kreuzmann as Magician Caligari
- Karel Dostal as Rudolf Unger, general director
