= Virginity (film) =

1937 film

- Theatrical release poster
- Directed by: Otakar Vávra
- Screenplay by: František Čáp; Marie Majerová; Otakar Vávra
- Based on: Panenství by Marie Majerová
- Produced by: Jan Sinnreich
- Starring: Lída Baarová
- Cinematography: Jan Roth
- Edited by: Jan Kohout
- Production company: Lucernafilm
- Distributed by: Lucernafilm
- Release date: 4 November 1937
- Running time: 81 minutes
- Country: Czechoslovakia
- Language: Czech

Virginity (Czech: Panenství) is a 1937 Czechoslovak drama film directed by Otakar Vávra.

== Cast ==
- Lída Baarová as Hana Poláčková
- Jaroslava Skorkovská as Hana's mother
- František Kreuzmann as Hana's stepfather
- Ladislav Boháč as Composer Pavel Jimeš
- Zdeněk Štěpánek as Bistro owner Josef Nevostrý
- Adina Mandlová as Shop assistant Lili
- Božena Šustrová as Shop assistant Mary
- Jaroslav Průcha as Lay judge Rudolf Res
- Vítězslav Boček as Poet Hejtmánek
- Anna Steimarová Old singer
- Marie Ježková as Dishwasher Barča
- František Filipovský as Waiter Jenda

== Production ==
The film was originally directed by Josef Rovenský, who died after two days of shooting. Vávra re-wrote the screenplay and re-cast some roles. Rolf Wanka was originally cast as Jimeš and Darja Hajská was cast as Barča.
