= Adina Mandlová =

Czech stage and film actress (1910–1991)

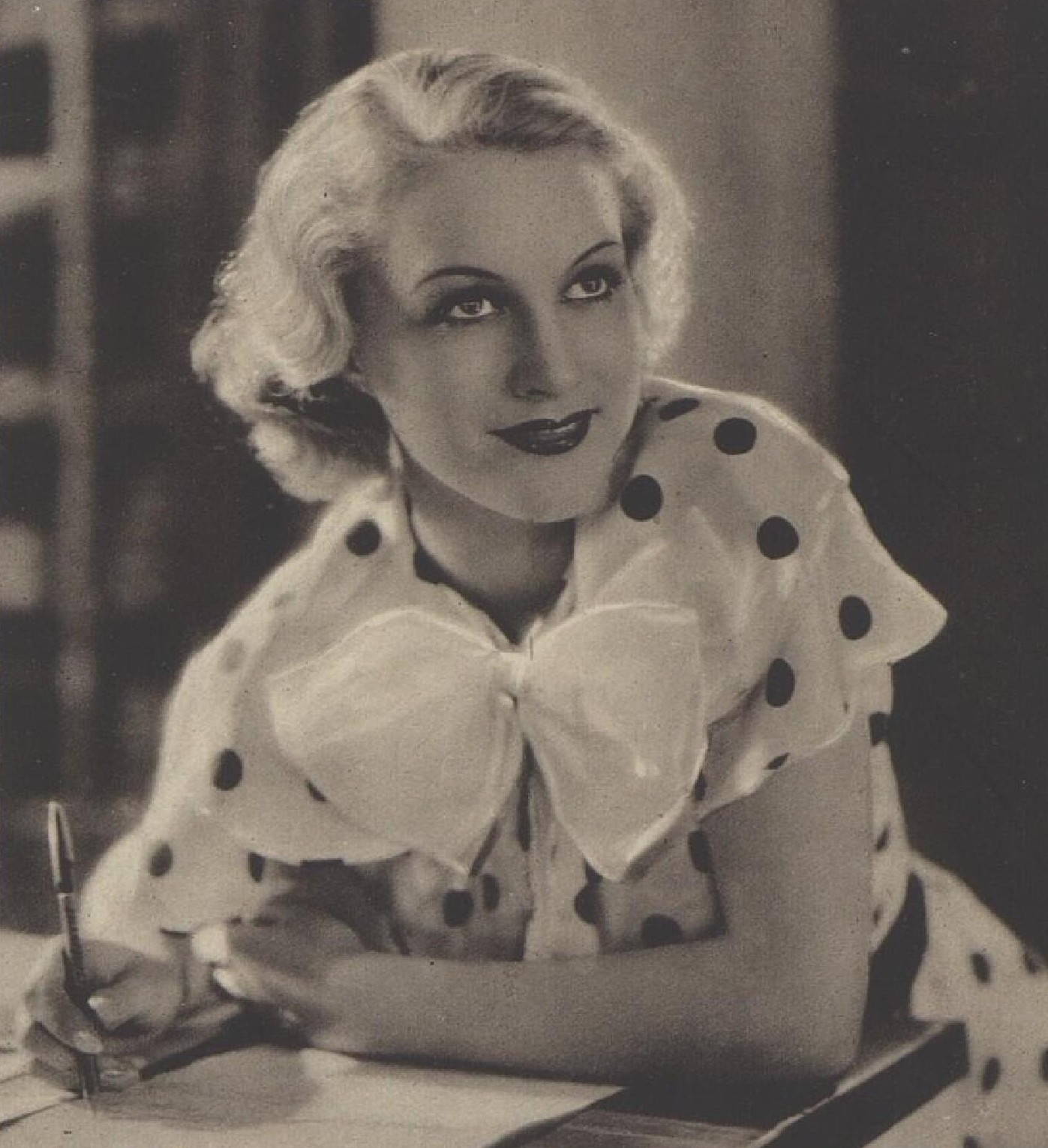
- Born: Jarmila Anna Františka Marie Mandlová; 28 January 1910; Mladá Boleslav, Austria-Hungary
- Died: 16 June 1991 (aged 81); Příbram, Czechoslovakia
- Occupation: Actress

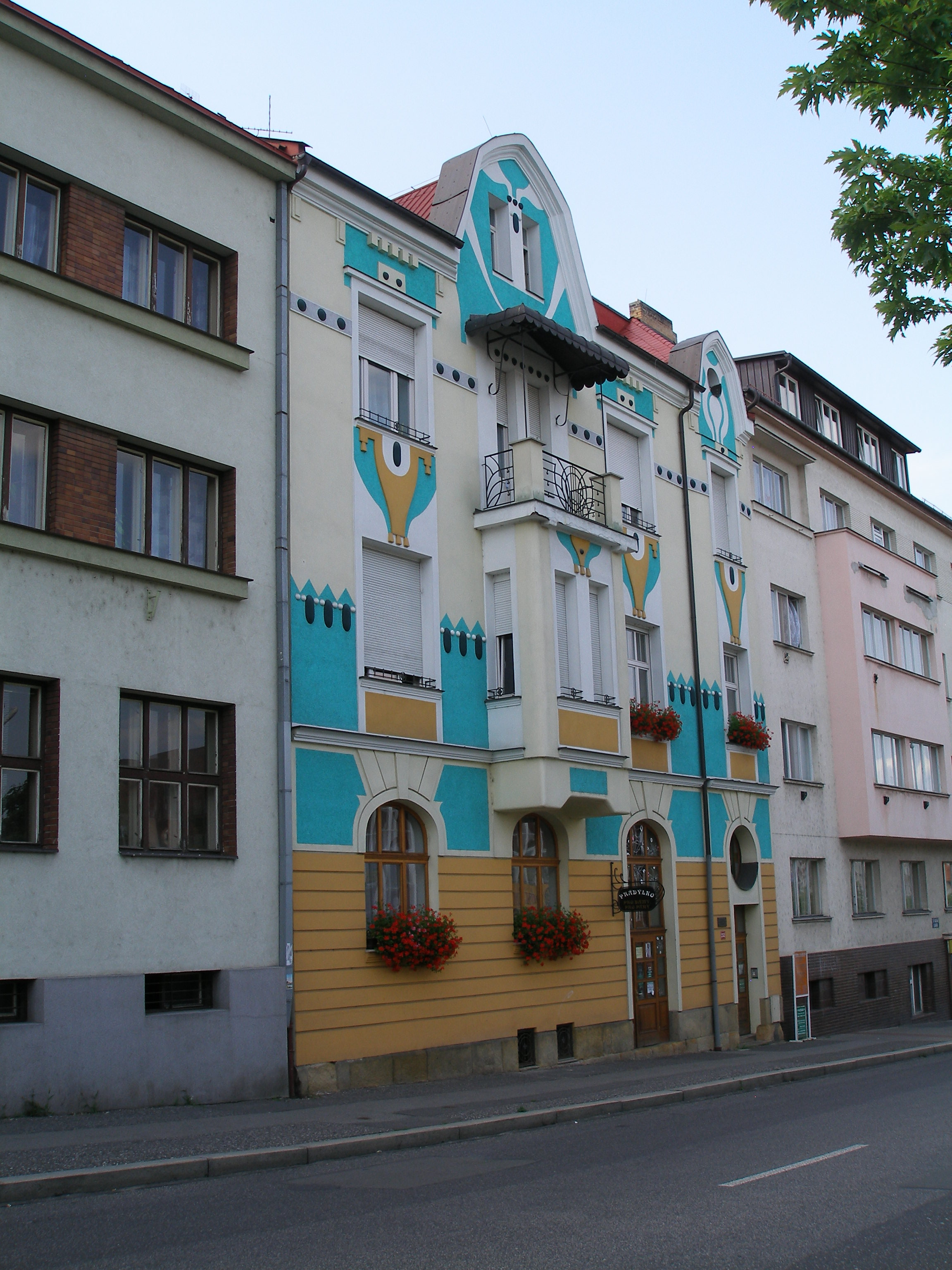
Birth house of Adina Mandlová in Mladá Boleslav

Adina Mandlová (28 January 1910 – 16 June 1991) was a Czech stage and film actress. She was one of the leading stars of 1930s and 1940s Czech cinema. She was involved in a number of scandals and love affairs.

== Life and career ==
=== Early days ===
She was born Jarmila Anna Františka Marie Mandlová in a middle-class family in Mladá Boleslav. Her father Jan Mandl was a talented pianist who wanted to study music in Vienna, but when his father died, he became a railway inspector. He married his first wife and had two sons – Jan and Karel. When his wife died of tuberculosis, he married Mandlová's mother Anna Krýžová. She was an innkeeper's daughter. Together they had a son Jiří, and finally a daughter Adina. Her father chose her name inspired by Gaetano Donizetti's opera L'elisir d'amore. He made Adina listen to classical music and to play the piano. When she was 7 years old, her father died of Spanish influenza. After his death her mother made Adina stop playing the piano. The family struggled financially, so her mother was stealing food from their neighbour Václav Klement's garden. After that her mother rented rooms in their house to students. Adina was sent to study at a boarding school in France at Paris, but was expelled before graduation. She got pregnant there and had an abortion. She returned home and become a secretary. Her film career started in 1932 thanks to a small part in film Děvčátko, neříkej ne!, where she performed as a model. In 1932 she met an actor Hugo Haas, who became her partner. He cast her in his movie Life Is a Dog in 1933. She worked as a model for a fashion designer Ulli Rosenbaum. Haas made her to refuse the main role in Gustav Machatý's movie Ecstasy (1933), which made Hedy Lamarr famous. They broke up in 1937. The movie Holka nebo kluk? (1938) was commercially very successful and made her the leading actress in Czechoslovakia.

=== Stardom ===
In the late 1930s and early 1940s she made her best movies by her own account – Virginity, Kouzelný dům or Nocturnal Butterfly. During the early 1940s and Second World War Mandlová dated German film director Willy Söhnel of Barrandov Studios. After a false rumour that she also dated a Reichsprotektor Karl Hermann Frank, her public image suffered. She was asked to act in a German movie I Entrust My Wife to You in 1942. She accepted the offer after the actor Heinz Rühmann came to meet her. Joseph Goebbels told her, that Hitler did not approve of Slavic sounding names in German movies and the name "Mandl" sounded too Jewish. The next day Mandlová found out she would be known as Lil Adina, a name that Goebbels personally chose for her. After the shooting was finished Frank sent a letter to Goebbels objecting that Mandlová should be cast in German films. Following the letter she was blacklisted from German and also Czech movies and acted only in theatres. She married a painter and ardent communist Zdeněk Tůma to silence the rumors about her and Frank. In 1943 she was finally cast in her next movie Happy Journey. After her husband committed suicide, she had a breakdown. In 1944 she fell in love with a married actor Vladimír Šmeral, her theatre colleague. She got pregnant, but after Šmeral was transported to a concentration camp and she learned he planned to stay with his wife, she suffered a miscarriage. Nevertheless, she helped to hide Šmeral until the end of the war when he escaped from the concentration camp. After the war Mandlová was arrested for suspicion she had become a German citizen. She was charged with collaboration and after two months sentenced to the time served.

=== Career in the United Kingdom ===
She was offered a role in Basil Dearden's movie Saraband for Dead Lovers, but a Communist Minister of Information Václav Kopecký refused to give her a passport. She married a Czech flight engineer Josef Kočvárek who had British citizenship and moved to UK in 1947. There she continued her acting career with only a moderate success. In 1948, she acted in the movie The Fool and the Princess. She fell in love with her co-star Bruce Lester and got divorced. Lester soon moved back to Hollywood and Mandlová stayed in England. Later she dated a producer Alexander Korda. She married a wealthy Englishman named Geoffrey Pilcher but immediately regretted it and the marriage ended in divorce after two years. In 1950 Mandlová got ill with tuberculosis and left to get a treatment in Switzerland. She then worked in Radio Free Europe and later as a secretary of a fashion designer Ben Pearson, whom she married in 1954. During the 1960s, she had small roles in the British TV shows Ghost Squad (in the episode "Rich Ruby Wine") and The Saint (in the episode "The Rhine Maiden") and continued acting in theatres. She also started sculpting.

=== Later years ===
Afterwards, she retired with Pearson to Malta, where she wrote her autobiography Dnes se tomu směju in 1977. In 1981 they moved to Canada. After the death of her husband, Mandlová, already very ill, moved back to Czechoslovakia in 1991.

She died on 16 June 1991.

== Filmography ==
- Děvčátko, neříkej ne! (1932) as Model
- Diagnosa X (1933) as Helena
- Life Is a Dog (1933) as Eva Durdysová
- V tom domečku pod Emauzy (1933) as Apolenka Dudková / Komtesa Lubecká
- The Little Pet (1934) as Marcella Johnová
- Nezlobte dědečka (1934) as Liduška
- Long Live with Dearly Departed (1935) as Alice Machová
- Svatá lež (1935)
- The Comedian's Princess (1936) as Lexová
- The Seamstress (1936) as Mici, Lorraine's lover
- Děvčata, nedejte se! (1937) as Vlasta
- Rozkošný příběh (1937) as Eva Randová
- Morality Above All Else (1937) as Eva Karasová, daughter
- The World Is Ours (1937) as Markétka, newscaster
- Poručík Alexander Rjepkin (1937) as Mathilda von Kiesewetter
- Virginity (1937) as Lili
- Blackmailer (1937) as Máša Lírová
- Kvočna (1937) as Katynka Svatá
- Harmonika (1937) as Elsa, Müller's girlfriend
- Důvod k rozvodu (1937) as Helena
- Krok do tmy (1938) as Eva Hallerová
- Ducháček Will Fix It (1938) as Julie z Rispaldic
- Svatební cesta (1938) as Káťa Holanová
- Druhé mládí (1938) as Fan Tobisová
- Bilá vrána (1938) as Jana Dubanská
- The Merry Wives (1938) as Rozina
- U pokladny stál... (1939) as Věra
- Camel Through the Eye of a Needle (1939) as Nina Štěpánová
- Nevinná (1939) as Jarmila Černá-Nováková
- Christian (1939) as Zuzana Rendlová
- Hvězda z poslední stace (1939) as Emilka
- The Magic House (1939) as Marie Ungrová
- Holka nebo kluk? (1939) as Ada Bártů
- The Catacombs (1940) as Nasťa Borková
- Dva týdny stěstí (1940) as Marta
- The Minister's Girlfriends (1940) as Julie Svobodová
- Pacientka Dr. Hegla (1940) as Karla Janotová
- Blue Star Hotel (1941) as Milada Landová
- Nocturnal Butterfly (1941) as Anča, called Kiki
- From the Czech Mills (1941) as Lola
- Těžký život dobrodruha (1941) as Helena Rohanová
- Okouzlená (1942) as Milada Jánská
- The Great Dam (1942) as Irena Berková
- Šťastnou cestu (1943) as Helena Truxová
- I Entrust My Wife to You (1943) as Ellinor Deinhardt
- Bláhový sen (1943) as Dida Kanská-Valentová
- Sobota (1945) as Luisa Herbertová
- The Fool and the Princess (1949) as Moura
- Summer Day's Dream (1949) as Irina Shestova
- The Master Builder (1950) as Hilda Wangel
