= Jiří Srnka =

Czech composer

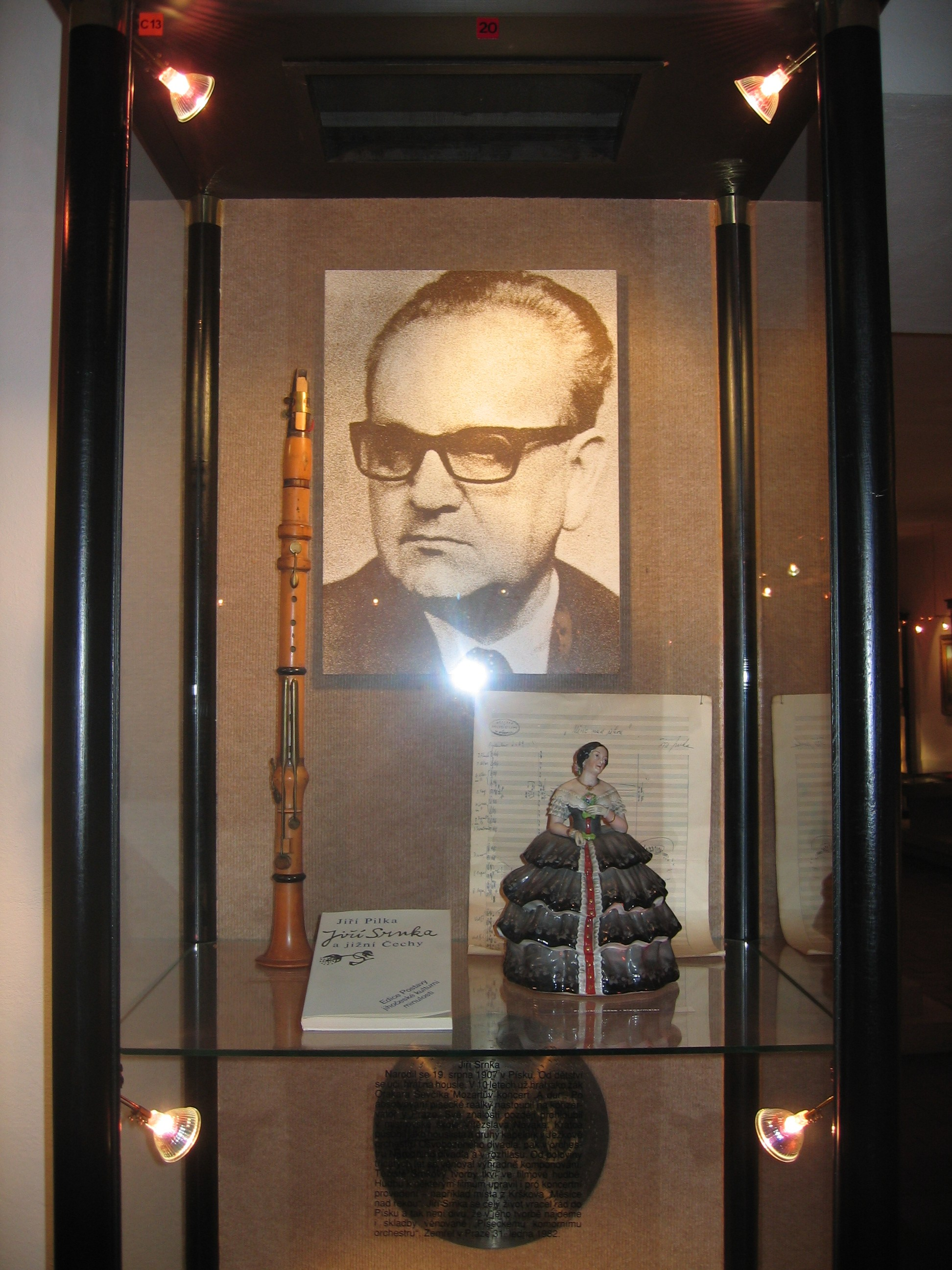
- Born: 19 August 1907; Písek, Bohemia, Austria-Hungary
- Died: 31 January 1982 (aged 74); Prague, Czechoslovakia
- Occupation: Composer

Jiří Srnka (19 August 1907 – 31 January 1982) was a Czech composer.

== Biography ==
His teacher was the well known violinist, Otakar Ševčík at the Prague Conservatory from the age of 8. From 1928, he studied at the school of Vítězslav Novák and Alois Hába. He composed music for nearly 200 films. These included Krakatit, Jan Hus, and Dařbuján a Pandrhola. Additionally, he created works for TV series, such as F. L. Věk. His works depicts the essential parts of his connection with the musical reality. He wrote several songs and orchestral works as well. He frequently worked with directors Otakar Vávra and František Čáp.

== Filmography ==
- Turbina (1941)
- The Great Dam (1942)
- Mist on the Moors (1943)
- Premonition (1947)
- Sign of the Anchor (1947)
- Krakatit (1948)
- White Darkness (1948)
- Silent Barricade (1949)
- Jan Hus (1954)
- Dařbuján a Pandrhola (1960)
- The Night Guest (1961)
- Witchhammer (1970)
