= Jaroslav Průcha =

Czech actor

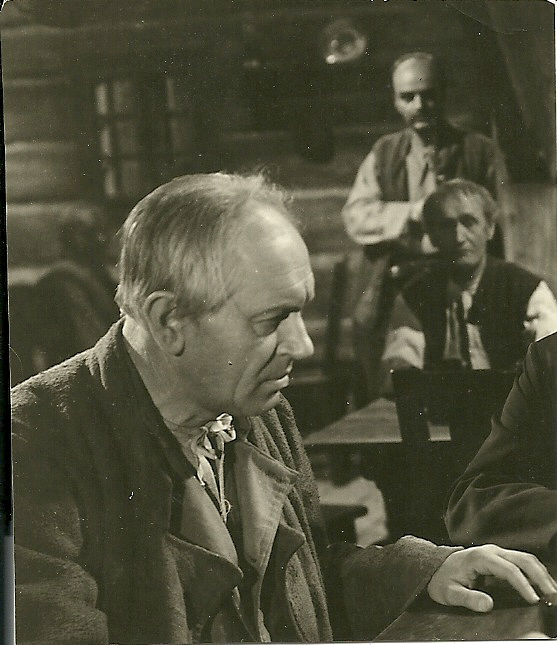
- Born: 24 April 1898; Skvrňany, Bohemia, Austria-Hungary
- Died: 25 April 1963 (aged 65); Prague, Czechoslovakia
- Occupation: Actor
- Years active: 1929–1963

Jaroslav Průcha (24 April 1898 – 25 April 1963) was a Czech film actor. He appeared in more than 50 films between 1929 and 1963.

He was born in Skvrňany, Bohemia, Austria-Hungary (now part of Plzeň, Czech Republic). He is buried at the Vyšehrad Cemetery.

== Selected filmography ==
- Paradise Road (1936)
- Skeleton on Horseback (1937)
- The World Is Ours (1937)
- Virginity (1937)
- Škola základ života (1938)
- Muž z neznáma (1939)
- Cesta do hlubin študákovy duše (1939)
- Humoreska (1939)
- Pacientka Dr. Hegla (1940)
- Jan Cimbura (1941)
- Barbora Hlavsová (1942)
- The Great Dam (1942)
- Mist on the Moors (1943)
- Černí myslivci (1945)
- A Big Case (1946)
- Thunder in the Hills (1946)
- The Avalanche (1946)
- Capek's Tales (1947)
- Krakatit (1948)
- Silent Barricade (1949)
- We Love (1952)
- Nástup (1953)
- Dog's Heads (1955)
