= Hana Vítová =

Czech actress (1914–1987)

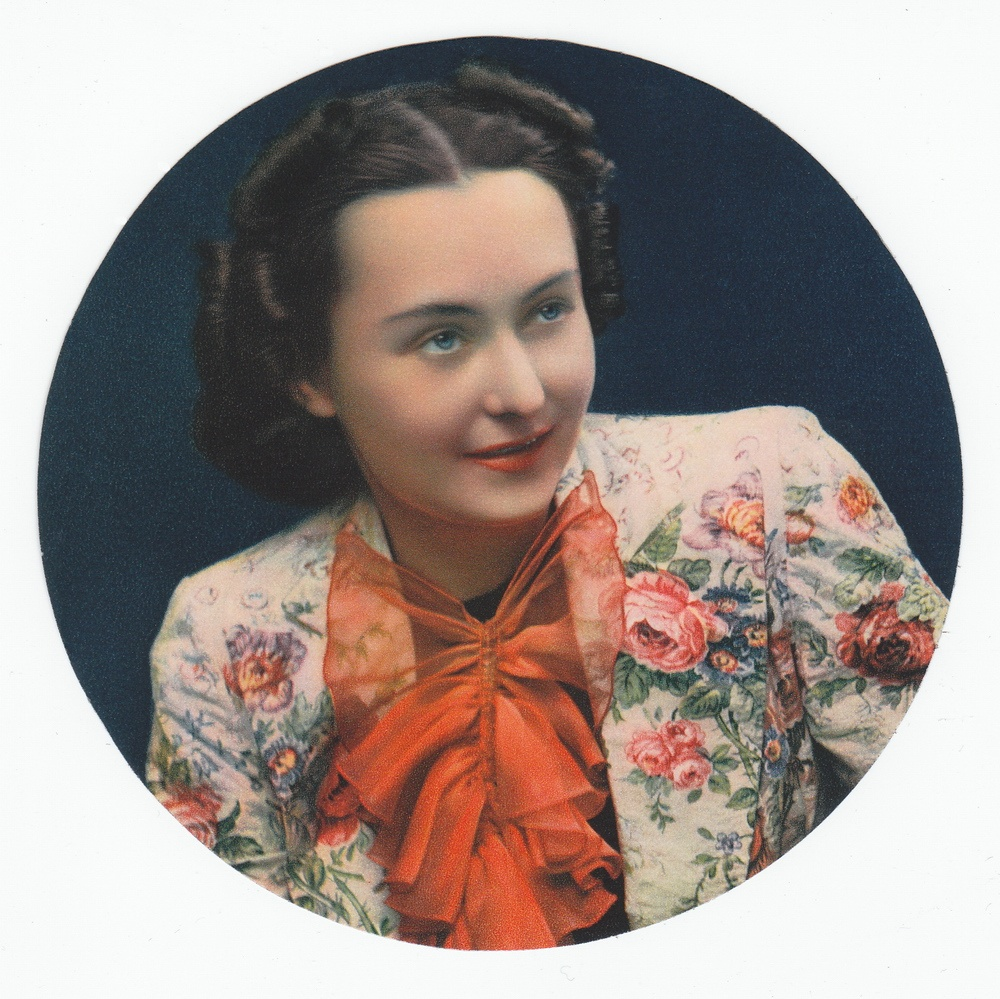
- Vítová in 1939
- Born: 24 January 1914; Prague, Bohemia, Austria-Hungary
- Died: 3 March 1987 (aged 73); Prague, Czechoslovakia
- Occupation: Actress
- Years active: 1931–1965

Hana Vítová (also known as Hanna Witt; 24 January 1914 – 3 March 1987) was a Czech film actress. She appeared in over 60 films between 1931 and 1965.

== Selected filmography ==
- Paradise Road (1936)
- Lidé na kře (1937)
- The Merry Wives (1938)
- A Foolish Girl (1938)
- Jiný vzduch (1939)
- Nocturnal Butterfly (1941)
- Valentin the Good (1942)
- The Second Shot (1943)
- Happy Journey (1943)
- Spring Song (1944)
- Saturday (1945)
- Sign of the Anchor (1947)
- The Poacher's Foster Daughter or Noble Millionaire (1949)
- The House in Karp Lane (1965)
