= Těžká Barbora =

Czech satirical play

Těžká Barbora (English: Heavy Barbora) is a Czech satirical play directed against the rising power of the Nazi régime. It was premiered on 5 November, 1937 at Osvobozené divadlo in Prague. The comedians Jan Werich and Jiří Voskovec appeared in the main roles, Jaroslav Ježek created the music.

== Plot ==
The story depicts a conflict between two fictional noble houses, Eidamští ("Eidams") and Yberlandští ("Yberlands"), the later attacking the former, the former then employing two soldiers (Werich and Voskovec), that build a cheese cannon (Těžká Barbora).

== Productions ==
=== Divadlo ABC ===
- Directed by Miroslav Zachata. The play had premiere on 14 June 1960 in ABC Theatre, Prague.
- Jan Werich
- Miroslav Horníček
- Mayor .... Lubomír Kostelka
- Ludmila Píchová
- Zlatomír Vacek
- Stella Zázvorková
- Jiří Pick
- Jiřina Bohdalová
- Stanislav Fišer
- Jan Víšek
- Václav Trégl
- Ivo Niederle
- Otto Lackovič
- Elena Hálková
- Lubomír Bryg
- Roman Hemala

=== Divadlo Radar ===
- Directed by Radka Tesárková, The play had premiere on 30 November and 1 December 2007 in Radar Theatre, Prague.
- Kristian van Bergen, mayor of Eidam City .... Jakub Baran or Vojtěch Klinger
- Greta, his unfaithful wife .... Eliška Holzknechtová or Barbora Heřmánková
- Hans Bolz, marshal .... Vojtěch Koutek
- Elisabeth, his devoted wife .... Markéta Hausnerová or Silvie Průšová or Andrea Včeláková
- Gustav Harmoniensis, teacher .... Jakub Hudec
- Vandergut, lord of castle .... Matěj Trojan
- Siska, mayor's butler .... Anna Kottasová or Kateřina Tvrdíková
- Krištof, cheesemaker .... Oliver Cox
- Peter, noble foreigner .... Jakub Heřmánek
- Shop assistant .... Eliška Holzknechtová or Barbora Heřmánková
- 1st Citizen of Eidam .... Markéta Hausnerová or Silvie Průšová
- 2nd Citizen of Eidam .... Anna Štěpánková
- 3rd Citizen of Eidam .... Lucie Špitálská or Ludmila Švrčinová
- Pyšvejcová, 1st schoolchild .... Anna Kottasová or Kateřina Tvrdíková
- 2nd schoolchild .... Markéta Hausnerová or Andrea Včeláková
- 3rd schoolchild .... Lucie Špitálská or Ludmila Švrčinová
- 4th schoolchild .... Kateřina Chadimová or Anna Štěpánková
- Captain .... Eliška Holzknechtová or Barbora Heřmánková
- Corporal .... Markéta Hausnerová or Silvie Průšová
- Jinkney .... Anna Kottasová or Kateřina Tvrdíková
- 1st Freelance .... Lucie Špitálská or Ludmila Švrčinová
- 2nd Freelance .... Kateřina Chadimová or Anna Štěpánková

=== Divadlo A. V. Šembery ===
- Directed by Josef Víšo. The play had premiere 21 September 2009 in A. V. Šembera Theatre, Vysoké Mýto.
- Kristian van Bergen .... Vladimír Martínek
- Greta, his unfaithful wife .... Dana Labová
- Hans Bolz, marshal of Eidam .... Petr Ryška
- Elisabeth, his devoted wife .... Petra Vtípilová
- Vanderburg, lord of castle .... Karel Fenik
- Gustav Harmoniensis, teacher .... Petr Klofanda
- Siska, mayor's butler .... Michaela Kotrbová
- Krištof, cheesemaker .... Václav Doležal
- Peter, noble foreigner .... Richard Matoušek
- Shop assistant .... Marie Švadlenová
- Councillor of Eidam .... Pavel Pešek
- Baker Woman .... Martina Štěpánová
- Butcher .... Martin Divoký
- Captain .... Josef Víšo
- Corporal .... Martin Divoký
- Jikney .... Karel Jiskra
- Jailor .... Karel Jiskra
- 1st schoolchild .... Tereza Havlíková
- 2nd schoolchild .... Barbora Fuksová
- 3rd schoolchild .... Žaneta Burešová
- 4th schoolchild .... Denisa Škorňová
- 5th schoolchild .... Lada Eliášová
- 1st Freelance .... Tomáš Válek
- 2nd Freelance .... Marek Harvan
