= František Zelenka =

Czech functionalist architect, graphic, stage and costume designer

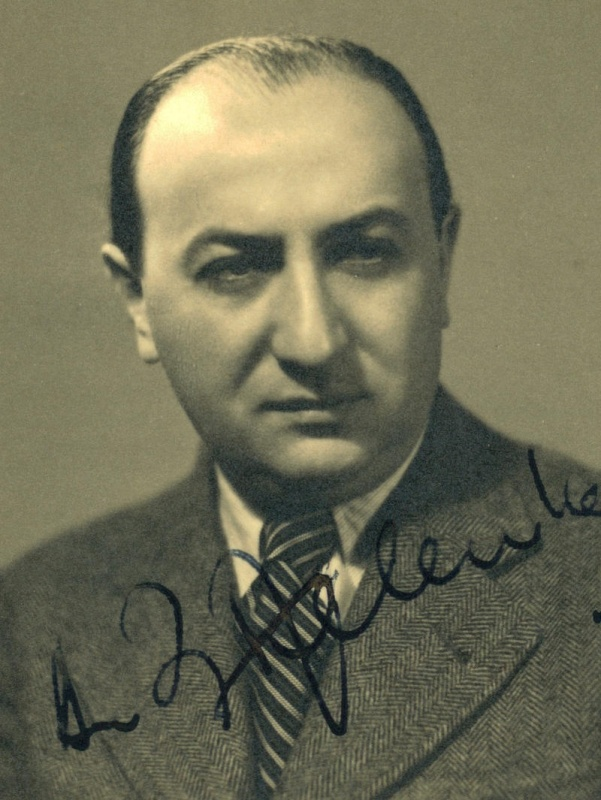
František Zelenka

František Zelenka (8 July 1904, Kutná Hora – 19 October 1944, Auschwitz) was a Czech functionalist architect, graphic, stage and costume designer.

== Life ==
Zelenka studied architecture at the Prague Technical University between 1923 and 1928. He was invited to collaborate on theatre stage set designs with Prague theatres: the National Theatre, the Liberated Theatre, the Estates Theatre, the Municipal Theatre in Vinohrady, the Chamber Theatre and with the Comedy Theatre in Smíchov. He also designed for theatres in Brno, Olomouc and Kutná Hora. He worked together with the greatest of the Czech theatre: E. F. Burián, Jiří Frejka, Karel Dostál and with Jiří Voskovec and Jan Werich, during the years of 1926–1941. Zelenka cooperated closely with members of the Czech avant-garde movement Devětsil. In 1931 he had one man exhibition of 39 posters in Krásná jizba gallery in Prague. His posters for the Liberated Theatre of Voskovec and Werich and Aero automobiles combine elements of modern art and advertising. As a member of the Architect's Club and The Artists Union Zelenka designed an exposition for Philips in Pardubice in 1930. His architectural works included family homes and villas in Prague-Smíchov and at Baba Estate and retail/apartment building on Palackého street and another one on Lodecká with Leopold Ehrmann. He also designed furniture and interiors such as the Blue Room for musical composer Jaroslav Ježek in Kaprova street. Zelenka was a designer of shops and interiors such the Josef R. Vilímek Bookshop (now Václav Špála Gallery) on Národní Avenue in Prague.

In 1938 he considered emigrating to Switzerland. On 13 July 1943 he was together with his family deported to the Theresienstadt Ghetto. There he organized theatre productions, designed costumes and acted as director on the children's opera BRUNDIBAR that was performed over 50 times. On 19 October 1944 together with his wife Gertruda and eight-year-old son Martin, Zelenka was transported to Auschwitz in occupied Poland. Elsewhere in previous sources the precise date of his death is not given as certain. According to another source Zelenka, and another slave laborer, Joseph Polák, both of whom toiled as catalogers at the Nazi-run Central Jewish Museum, Prague, were deported to the Terezín concentration-death camp Polak perished spring 1943. Between September 1942 and October 1943, the Jewish slave labor catalogers, including Zelenka, Polák, and curator Tobias Jacobovits, catalogued enormous quantities of the Judaica objects stolen by the Nazis from the Jewish communities of Bohemia and Moravia. The stolen items were for the Nazis planned Museum of the Extinct Jewish Race. At the end of the war, these objects numbered 140,000 items. Jacobovitz was murdered at Auschwitz on 29 October 1944.

== Notable works ==
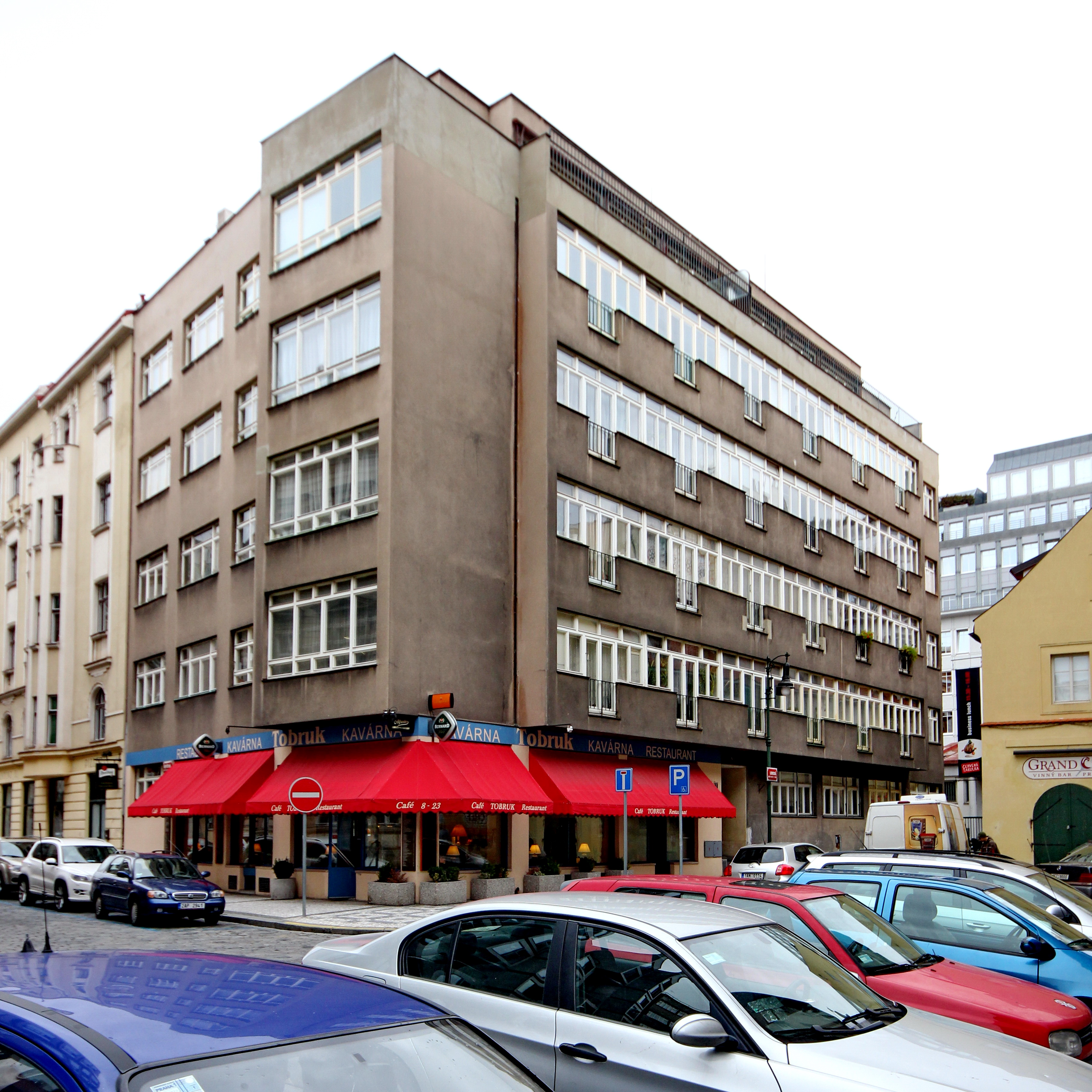
1937–1938 Apartment building, Lodecká 3, Prague with Leopold Ehrmann

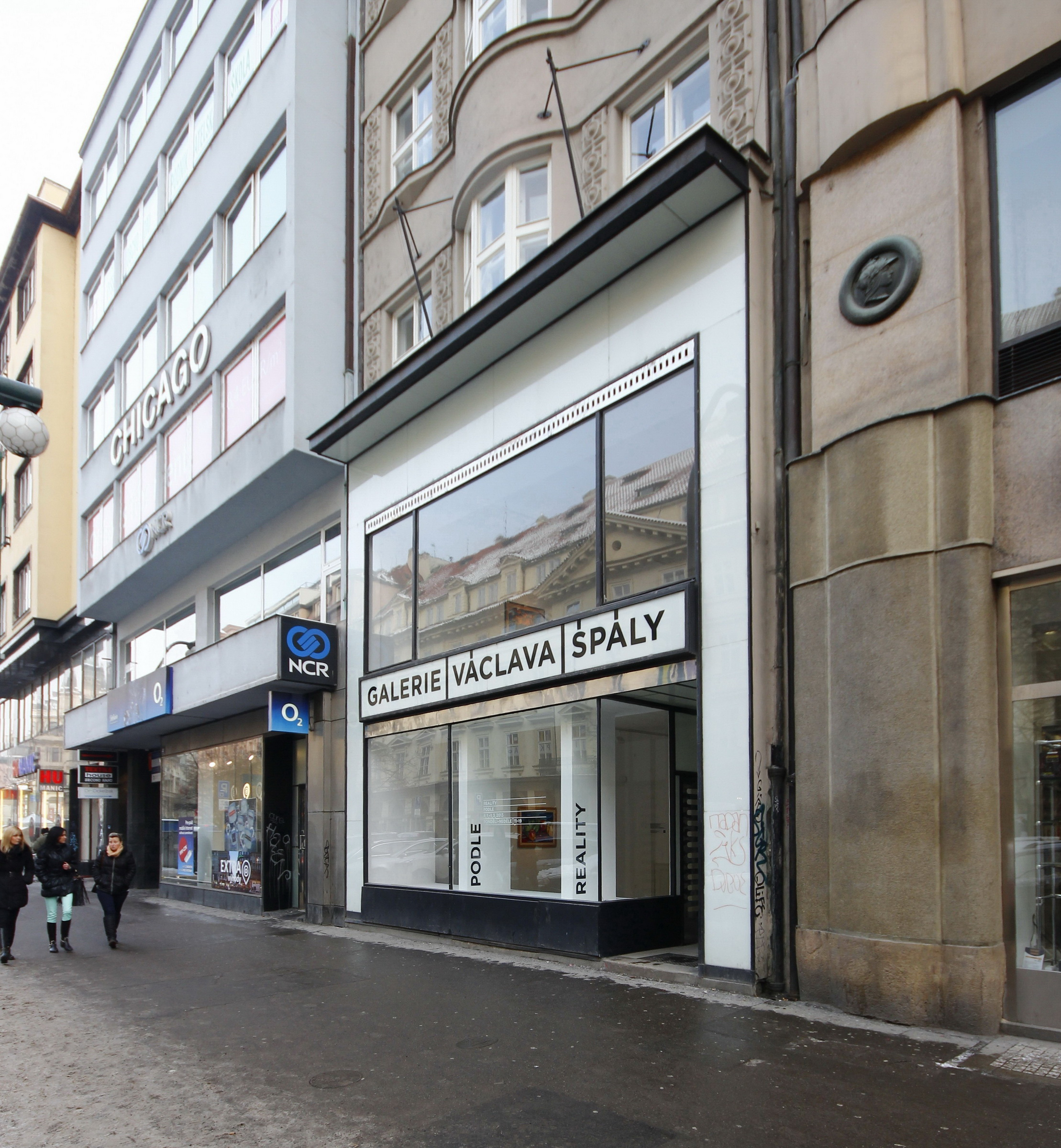
1938 Vilímek Bookshop, Prague, now Václav Špála Gallery

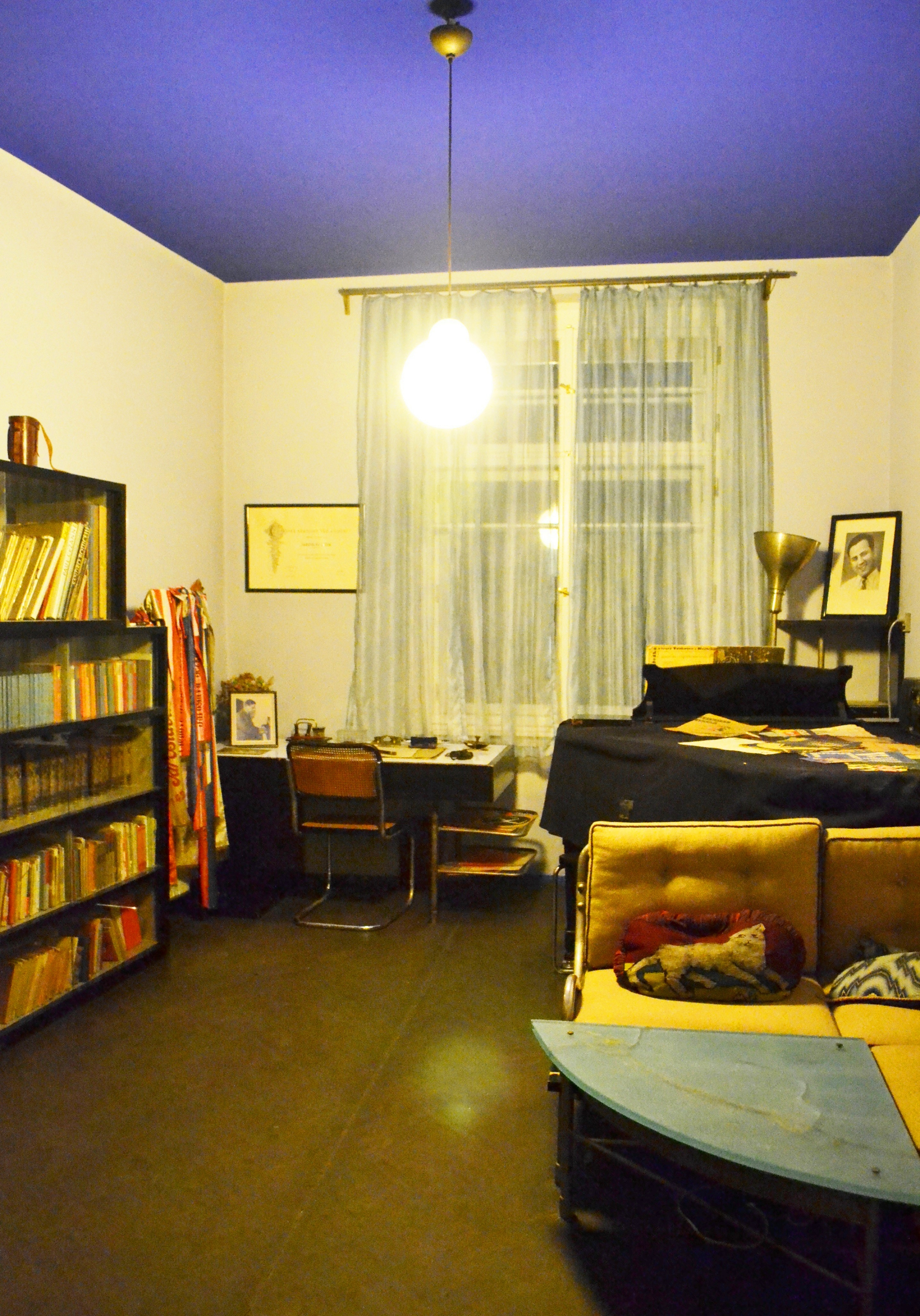
1926 Blue Room of Jaroslav Ježek

== Literature ==
- Tomeš, Josef (1992). Československý biografický slovník (in Czech). Prague: Academia. ISBN 80-200-0443-2.
- Margolius, Ivan (1996). Prague: a guide to twentieth century architecture. London: Ellipsis. p. 302. ISBN 1-899858-18-0.
- Kohout, Michal (1999). Prague: 20th Century Architecture. Prague: Zlatý řez. ISBN 80-901562-2-3.
