= Workers, Let's Go =

1934 Czechoslovak comedy film

Heave-Ho!
- Directed by: Martin Frič
- Written by: Václav Wasserman; Jan Werich; Jiří Voskovec; Martin Frič
- Starring: Jan Werich; Jiří Voskovec
- Cinematography: Otto Heller
- Edited by: Martin Frič
- Music by: Jaroslav Ježek
- Production company: Meissner
- Distributed by: Meissner
- Release date: 1934
- Running time: 110 minutes
- Country: Czechoslovakia
- Language: Czech

Workers, Let's Go or Heave-Ho! (Czech: Hej-rup!) is a 1934 Czechoslovak comedy directed by Martin Frič. Popular actors and playwrights from Osvobozené divadlo Jiří Voskovec and Jan Werich co-wrote the screenplay and acted in the movie.

== Cast ==
- Jiří Voskovec as Filip Kornet, Shuffer
- Jan Werich as Jakub Simonides
- Helena Bušová as Marta
- Josef Skřivan as Worst, president at cannery
- Theodor Pištěk as Brown, director concern of Simonides
- Zvonimir Rogoz as Director factory of Simonides
- Alois Dvorský as House-keeper
- Václav Trégl as Shuffer
- Frantisek Černý as Shuffer
- Miroslav Svoboda as Shuffer
- Jan W. Speerger as Shuffer
- Jan Richter as Shuffer
- František Filipovský as Shuffer
- Bohuš Záhorský as Shuffer
