= The Emperor and the Golem =

1952 Czechoslovak comedy film

- Directed by: Martin Frič
- Written by: Jan Werich; Jiří Brdečka
- Starring: Jan Werich; Nataša Gollová; František Černý
- Cinematography: Jan Stallich
- Edited by: Jan Kohout
- Music by: Julius Kalaš
- Production company: Československý státní film
- Distributed by: Rozdělovna filmů Československého státního filmu
- Release date: January 4, 1952; (Czechoslovakia)
- Running time: 80 minutes (Part I); 64 minutes (Part II)
- Country: Czechoslovakia
- Language: Czech
- Budget: 7,220,000 Kčs

The Emperor and the Golem (Czech: Císařův pekař a pekařův císař, literally "The Emperor′s Baker and Baker′s Emperor") is a two-part Czechoslovak historical fantasy comedy film produced in 1951. The film was shot in color (not common for Czechoslovak films in that period) because of the international release and is set during the reign of Rudolf II, Holy Roman Emperor and King of Bohemia (1583–1611) and takes place in Late Renaissance (Mannerist) Prague. It is one of the best known films of Jan Werich, who performed the dual roles of Emperor Rudolf and baker Matěj. The movie is still quite popular in Czech society due to its catchy songs and its impressive portrayal of the Golem, a mythical anthropomorphic robot-like creature allegedly made from clay by the renowned Rabbi Loew.

== Plot ==
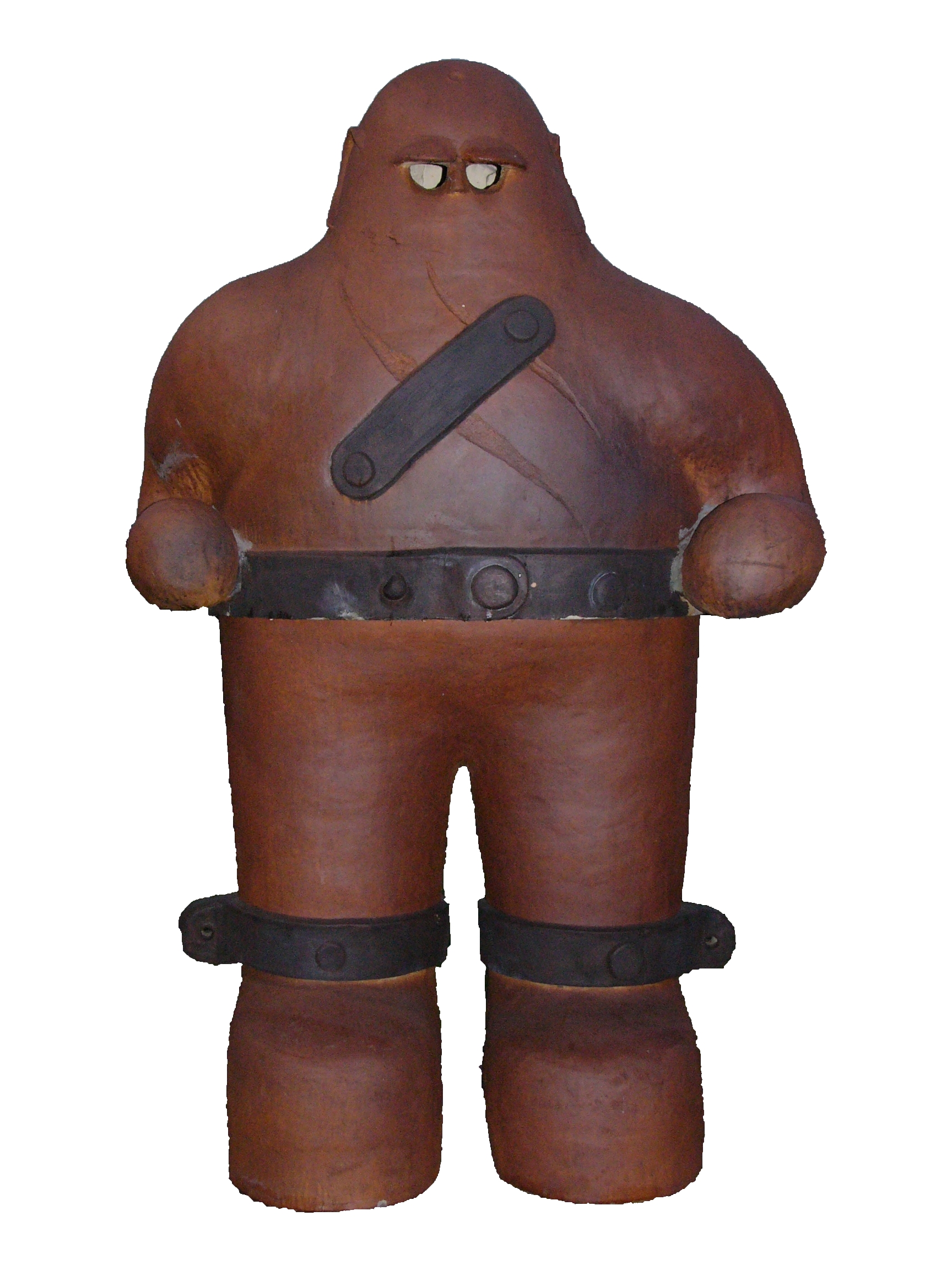
Model of the Golem from the film

=== Part I ===
Aging and eccentric Emperor Rudolf II, who is obsessed with finding the Golem, refuses to hear out ambassadors and falls into destructive fits. Later he welcomes Magister Edward Kelley at Prague Castle and shows him his alchemy laboratory. All the alchemists are either charlatans or fools. Rudolf wants an alchemist named Scotta to make him an elixir of youth, and pressures him into performing a magic ritual at night. While performing the ritual, they accidentally stumble upon the Golem. However, the Golem can't be awakened without a little ball called shem.

Meanwhile, an assistant baker named Matěj is confronted by an angry mob demanding bread rolls which are usually baked only for the emperor. When the corrupt head of the bakery leaves the building, Matěj distributes the emperor's bread rolls to the poor and is imprisoned in the dungeons for this deed. Kelley reveals his homunculus Sirael, whom Rudolf wishes to teach about everything in the world, including love. Rudolf does not know that Sirael is a regular country girl named Kateřina who has been coerced by Kelley to act in this fashion. Kateřina and Matěj fall in love while communicating through vents between Kelley's room and the dungeons, although they cannot see each other. The alchemist Scotta concocts an elixir of youth for Rudolf, which is actually a mix of strong alcohol and morphium. Meanwhile, Matěj escapes the dungeons.

=== Part II ===
Rudolf drinks Scotta's concoction and falls asleep. Matěj ends up in the emperor's rooms. Servants of the Emperor find the fugitive Matěj hiding in the bath, and due to his remarkable likeness to Rudolf when he was younger, they believe the rejuvenation has worked and dress him as Emperor accordingly. After waking up, Rudolf sees Matěj and similarly mistakes him for his younger self in the mirror. Elated by his supposed new vigor, Rudolf and his old loyal servant ride alone in a carriage to the countryside to remind themselves of the sins of their misspent youth.

The emperor's mistress Countess Strada also believes the rejuvenation worked and drinks up the remnants of the concoction. She embarrasses Matěj with her advances and then falls asleep. The horrified and confused Matěj puts her on top of a double-decker bed, and decides that acting like Rudolf is his best chance to find Kateřina. Under this false identity, Matěj dismisses Rudolf's astrologer, minimises his extravagant expenses and deals with all the waiting ambassadors. He attempts to rule fairly, all the while searching for Kateřina. He finds a helper in Scotta, who knows his elixir could not have worked, and therefore knows Matěj is not the real emperor.

Meanwhile, intrigue abounds among the emperor's councillors and Kelley. They want to overthrow Rudolf and seize power for themselves. They all want to utilise the Golem and chase after the shem, which Matěj eventually finds. Kelley then pressures Kateřina into killing the emperor, but Matěj reveals to her that he's not Rudolf. Matěj's identity is also revealed to the councillors, who fight amongst themselves while trying to capture him and Kateřina. Kelley is killed and Matěj is captured.

The Court Astrologer gets the shem from Matěj and awakens the Golem. Lang kills the astrologer and Russworm kills Lang. Then Russworm is killed by the Golem, who will only obey the person who put the shem in its head. The real Rudolf returns as the Golem is destroying the palace. Eventually, with the help of the townspeople, Matěj succeeds in stopping the Golem and removing the shem. Rudolf is reinstated as Emperor after Matěj convinces him to give the Golem to the people rather than use it for his own means. The Golem is installed in the bakery and its power is used to make more bread for everyone.

== Cast ==
- Jan Werich as Emperor Rudolf II / Baker Matěj Kotrba
- Marie Vášová as Countess Catherina Strada
- Nataša Gollová as Kateřina aka Sirael
- Bohuš Záhorský as Chamberlain Filip Lang
- Jiří Plachý as Edward Kelley
- Zdeněk Štěpánek as Marshall Bernard Russworm
- František Filipovský as Court Astrologer
- František Černý as Alchemist Jeroným Alessandro Scotta
- Václav Trégl as Emperor's personal servant
- Vladimír Leraus as Hungarian Delegate
- Miloš Nedbal as Court Physician
- Bohuš Hradil as Tycho Brahe
- František Holar as Guard Commander

== Production ==
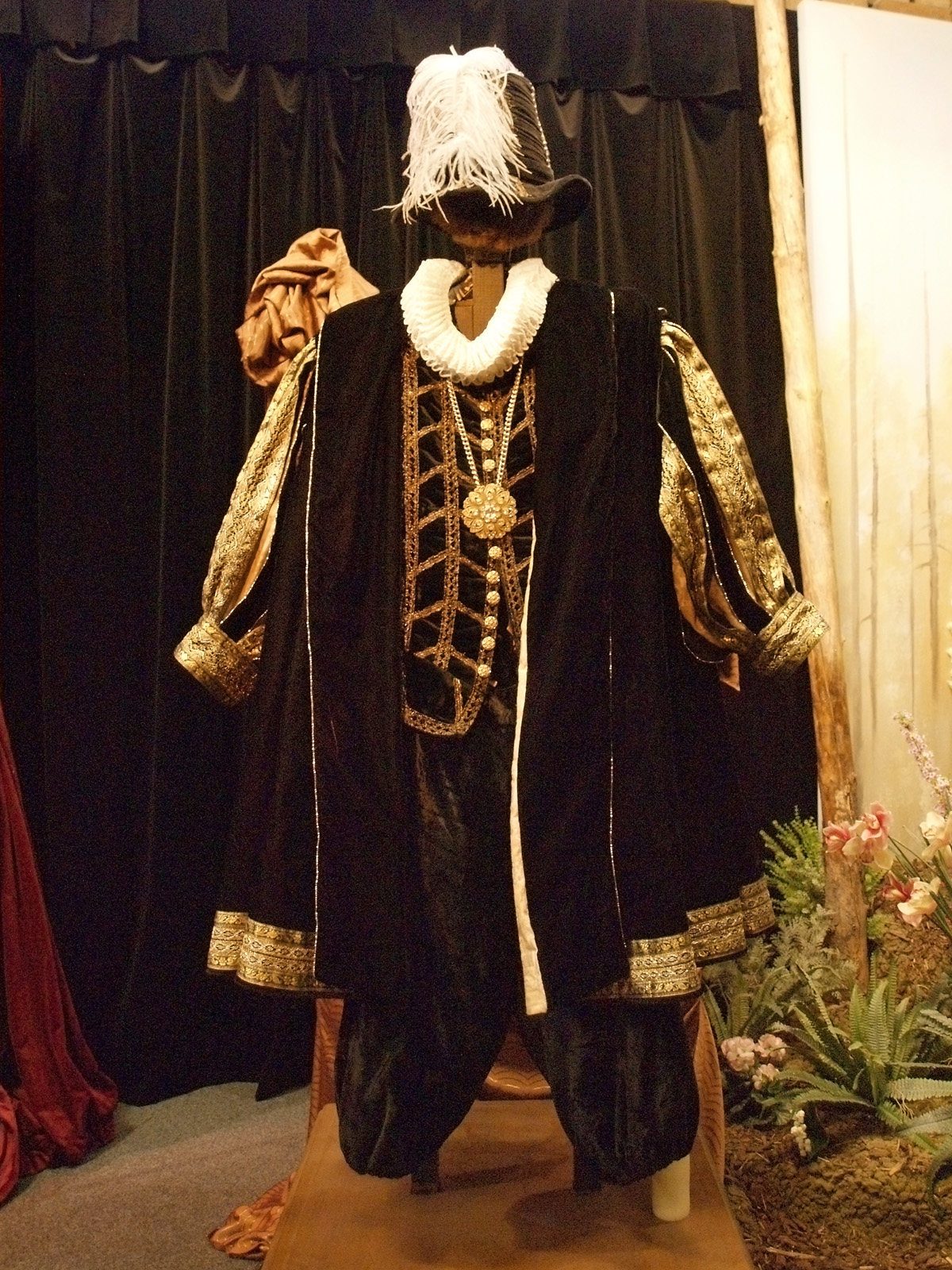
Costume used in the film

Jan Werich and Jiří Voskovec first tried to make a film based on their play Golem in the 1930s. That film eventually became Le Golem directed by Julien Duvivier, who significantly re-wrote the screenplay and changed it into a horror film. Werich returned to this theme in the 1950s and co-wrote a screenplay with Jiří Brdečka. It was originally directed by Jiří Krejčík, but after disputes with Werich, Krejčík was replaced by Martin Frič. The whole film was shot in Barrandov Studios. It was the third Czechoslovak full-length color film after Warriors of Faith and Temno. It was shot using Eastmancolor and Agfacolor material. Its costumes were based on designs by Jiří Trnka.

== Release ==
The Emperor and the Golem premiered on 4 January 1952 as a two-part film which ran for 155 minutes.

=== International version ===
A 112-minute-long one-part international version was prepared, with most propaganda-related scenes cut out, such as its songs. It was successfully distributed in many countries, including Italy, West Germany, East Germany, Sweden, USA, UK, Finland, France, Belgium and Argentina.
