= Josef Skřivan =

Czech actor (1902–1942)

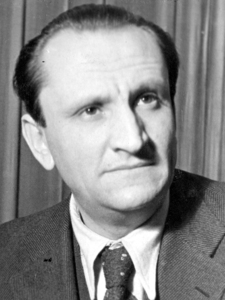
- Born: 10 August 1902; Prague, Austria-Hungary
- Died: 4 November 1942 (aged 40); Auschwitz concentration camp, German-occupied Poland
- Occupation: Actor
- Years active: 1920–1937

Josef Skřivan (10 August 1902 – 4 November 1942) was a Czech actor and director. He was active in theatre and film between 1920 and 1937. A resistance member, he was arrested by the Gestapo in October 1941 and was executed at Auschwitz concentration camp in 1942.

== Select filmography ==
- Jménem Jeho Veličenstva (1928)
- Pudr a benzin (1931)
- Peníze nebo život (1932)
- Hej rup (1934)
- Ztratila se Bílá paní (1937)
