= Jaroslav Ježek (composer) =

Czechoslovak composer, pianist, conductor, and teacher (1906–1942)

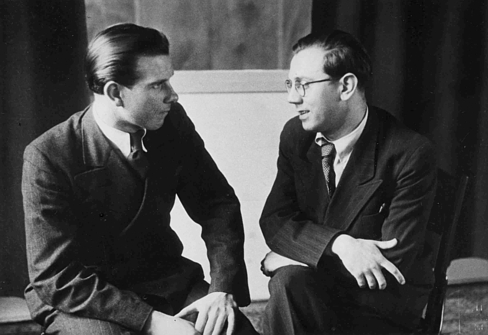
Jiří Traxler and Jaroslav Ježek (right) in 1938

Jaroslav Ježek (pronounced [ˈjaroslaf ˈjɛʒɛk]) (September 25, 1906 – January 1, 1942) was a Czech composer, pianist and conductor, author of jazz, classical, incidental and film music.

== Life ==
Ježek was born in the Prague quarter of Žižkov to the family of a tailor. He was almost blind from a young age. He studied composition at the Prague Conservatory as a pupil of Karel Boleslav Jirák (1924–1927), at the master school of composition with Josef Suk (1927–1930), and shortly also with Alois Hába (1927–1928). Ježek met the playwrights/comedians Jan Werich and Jiří Voskovec, leaders of the Osvobozené divadlo (Prague Liberated Theatre) in Prague, and took up the post of main composer and conductor for the theatre. During the next decade (from 1928 to 1939), he composed incidental music, songs, dances, and ballets for the comic and satirical plays of Voskovec and Werich. In 1934 he became a member of Czech Group of Surrealists. Forced to leave Czechoslovakia following the Nazi occupation, Ježek, Voskovec and Werich went into exile in New York City. He worked as a piano teacher and choirmaster there, and continued to work with Voskovec and Werich. In 1942, the long-ill Ježek died of chronic kidney disease in New York. On December 29, 1941, three days before his death, Ježek married Frances Bečáková.

He collaborated with many avant-garde artists of pre-war Czechoslovakia, such as Vítězslav Nezval and E. F. Burian.

== Music ==
His musical output is commonly divided into two parts. The first part of his work consists of chamber, piano and concertant compositions, created first under the influence of Stravinsky, of the Parisian Les Six and of Arnold Schoenberg. Later he found his own, specific and modern expression. He also became a popular jazz composer in pre-war Czechoslovakia. He composed songs and dances for the revue plays of the Prague Free Theatre (The Ass and the Shadow, Caesar, The Headsman and the Fool e.g.) and also for the films of Voskovec and Werich (Pudr a benzín, The World Is Ours, Heave-Ho!). His melodies are popular in the Czech Republic to this day.

Ježek was also fascinated by American jazz. Between 1929 and 1936, possibly earlier, he organized and conducted an orchestra featuring his original jazz compositions and arrangements. Billed variously as "Ježek's Jazz" and "Ježkův swingband" they recorded for the Czech Ultraphon label, making some of the most original music in Europe. "Bugatti Step" (1930; Ultraphon A10166) is an up-tempo number for piano and jazz orchestra, enjoying enduring popularity as a hot jazz piano solo. "Teď ještě ne" (1931; Ultraphon A10217) is rousing dance music in the Jean Goldkette or Coon-Sanders' Nighthawks style. "Rubbish Heap Blues" (1937; Ultraphon A11421) shows that Ježek not only listened to Duke Ellington's records, but was keeping up with Duke's very latest work. "Rubbish Heap" features a Johnny Hodges-like alto sax and a Cootie Williams-like growl trumpet, plus a three-trombone section to complement the three trumpets.

Ježek's composition "Polonaisa" (1931; Ultraphon A10355) is a traditional Polonaise clothed in modern instrumentation, harmony and textures. It is as if Chopin and Gershwin had collaborated, the Polish dance rhythms mingling easily with hot syncopation. Ježek also turned the boys loose in records of his arrangements of well-known hot jazz standards of the period, such as "Tiger Rag", "Dinah" and "Chinatown, My Chinatown". Supraphon and Panton, another state Czechoslovak label, released compilation reissues of his jazz work from 1962 to 1987. However, these recordings are largely unknown in the United States.

A seven-volume album retrospective of Voskovec and Werich's work for the Liberated Theater (1929–1938) containing the items mentioned above and dozens of others was issued by Supraphon in 1994 (and reissued in 2007).

== Selected works ==
Orchestral

- Concert for Piano and Orchestra (1927)
- Fantasy for Piano and Orchestra (1930)
- Concert for Violin and Orchestra (1930)
- Symphonic Poem (1936)

Chamber

- Serenade for Wind Quartet (1929)
- Wind Quintet (1931)
- String Quartet No. 1 (1932)
- Sonata for Violin and Piano (1933)
- Duo for 2 Violins (1934)
- String Quartet No. 2 (1941)

Piano

- Suite for Quarter-tone Piano (1927)
- Sonatina (1928)
- Petite Suite (1928)
- Capriccio (1932)
- Etuda (1933)
- Bagatelles (1933)
- Rhapsodie (1938)
- Toccata (1939)
- Grande valse brillante (1939)
- Sonata (1941)

== See also ==
- Jaroslav Ježek Conservatory
- Osvobozené divadlo

== Books ==
- Holzknecht, Václav: Jaroslav Ježek a Osvobozené divadlo. Prague: Arsci, 2007. ISBN 978-80-86078-67-0
