= Smíchov Synagogue =

Former Reform synagogue in Pacific, Czech Republic

- Czech: Smíchovská synagoga
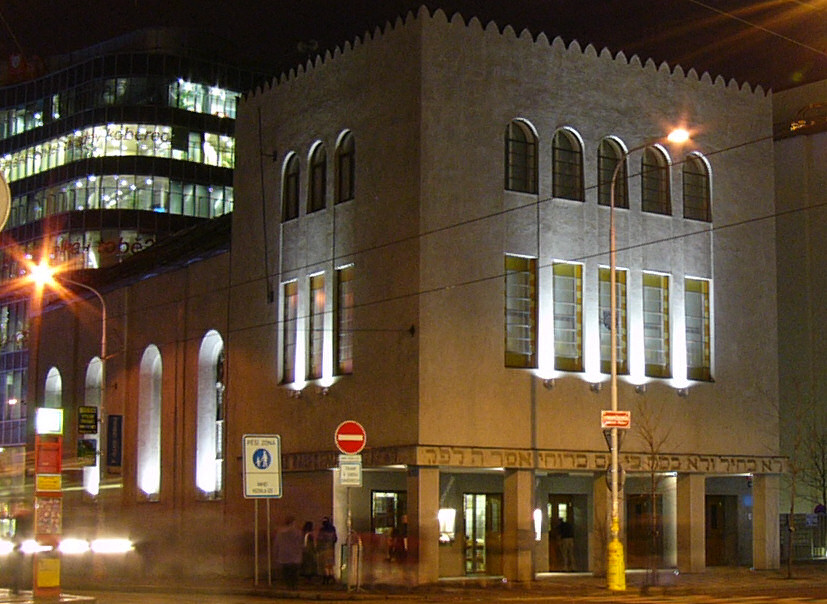
- The former synagogue, now museum, in 2006

- Location of the former synagogue, now museum, in the Czech Republic

Religion
- Affiliation: Reform Judaism (former)
- Rite: Nusach Ashkenaz
- Ecclesiastical or organisational status: Synagogue (1863–1941); Warehouse (1941–1990); Jewish museum (since 1998)
- Status: Closed (as a synagogue); Repurposed

Location
- Location: Stroupežnického 32, Smíchov, Prague
- Country: Czech Republic
- Coordinates: 50°04′18″N 14°24′11″E

Architecture
- Architect: Leopold Ehrmann (1931)
- Type: Synagogue architecture
- Style: 1863: Romanesque Revival; Moorish Revival; 1931: Functionalism; Art Nouveau
- Completed: 1863; 1931
- Materials: Brick

National Cultural Monument of the Czech Republic
- Official name: Smíchov Synagogue
- Type: Object
- Designated: 26 November 1990
- Reference no.: 1000153585

The Smíchov Synagogue (Czech: Smíchovská synagoga) is a former Reform Jewish congregation and synagogue, located at Stroupežnického 32, Smíchov, in Prague, in the Czech Republic. Completed in 1863, the former synagogue was remodelled in 1931 in the Functionalist style. After the World War II, the building was used for secular purposes because the Smíchov Jewish community ceased to exist in the Shoah. Since 1998, the building has been used as an archive of the Jewish Museum in Prague.

In 1990, the building was listed as a National Cultural Monument of the Czech Republic.

== Former appearance ==
The first synagogue of the Smíchov Jewish community was in ruins and dangerous for its visitors after only three years of use. The Jewish Community, indebted since the original building project and totally unprepared for another expense, gained financial means to replace the ruin with a new synagogue from Franz Ringhoffer II, Smíchov mayor, businessman (founder of the important Smíchov railway car factory) and surprisingly enough, a gentile.

The building was finished on 30 August 1863. Its outside was built in Romanesque Revival style while the inner space was formed in Moorish Revival style. The Smíchov Jewish Community belonged to reform rite; therefore there was a pump organ in the synagogue, yet later it was replaced by more representative organ. Capacity of the synagogue was more than 180 seats for men and about 140 seats for women. As for size, the synagogue was much smaller than synagogues in traditional areas of Jewish settlement – for instance, the Spanish Synagogue in Josefov, former Prague Jewish ghetto, has about 800 seats and seats of the Smíchov Synagogue would fill only the women section of this synagogue. The reason is plain enough – development of Jewish community in Smíchov was tightly interconnected with a boom of industry in Smíchov in the 19th century.

In 1897, the central government of the Austrian-Hungarian Empire failed to enforce a law that would guarantee equal rights to Czech- and German-speaking people. This unwelcome result caused riots in numerous Czech towns and cities including Prague and its vicinity. The violence was aimed against the considerable German population of the Czech lands and also against Jews who were considered pro-German at large. Before the rampages were suppressed, also by the aid of martial law, the Smíchov synagogue had been severely damaged. The situation was apparently so grave that also The New York Times reported it.

== Modern history ==
Since the 1920s the Smíchov Jewish Community had looked for a site to build a new synagogue but because they did not succeed, they decided to rebuild the existing one. A modern purist design of 1930–31 by Leopold Ehrmann gave the synagogue a functionalist outside; the inner space was probably designed in the Art Nouveau style. However, the renovated synagogue served religious purposes for only a decade.

In 1941, Nazi administrative of the country decided to use the building for storage of confiscated properties. After the World War II, the Smíchov Jewish Community was not re-established and the building passed to hands of a near factory Tatra, which used it as a warehouse. Some structural interventions were made (new concrete floor, change of storey disposition and construction of elevator), they caused damage to the synagogue and in 1986 it was proposed that it be demolished. This decision was not carried out, only because the synagogue was enlisted among historical architectural monuments.

After the Velvet Revolution, in 1990, the synagogue became a property of the Prague Jewish Community, which hired it to Jewish Museum in Prague in 1998. During following five years the synagogue was completely reconstructed. Nowadays, the Museum uses the building as an archive and a reading room. Self-supported structure provides space for this purpose, while the original disposition and decoration remains intact.

== Inscription ==
Quotation over the arcade attracts much attention. At the northern side there is "Peace, peace to him that is far off, and to him that is near" (Isaiah 57,19) in Czech, and at the western side "Not by might, nor by power, but by my spirit, saith the LORD of hosts" (Zechariah 4,6) in Hebrew. Gematrical value of the Hebrew inscription hints at date of reconstruction of the synagogue (5)691/1931.

== Gallery ==
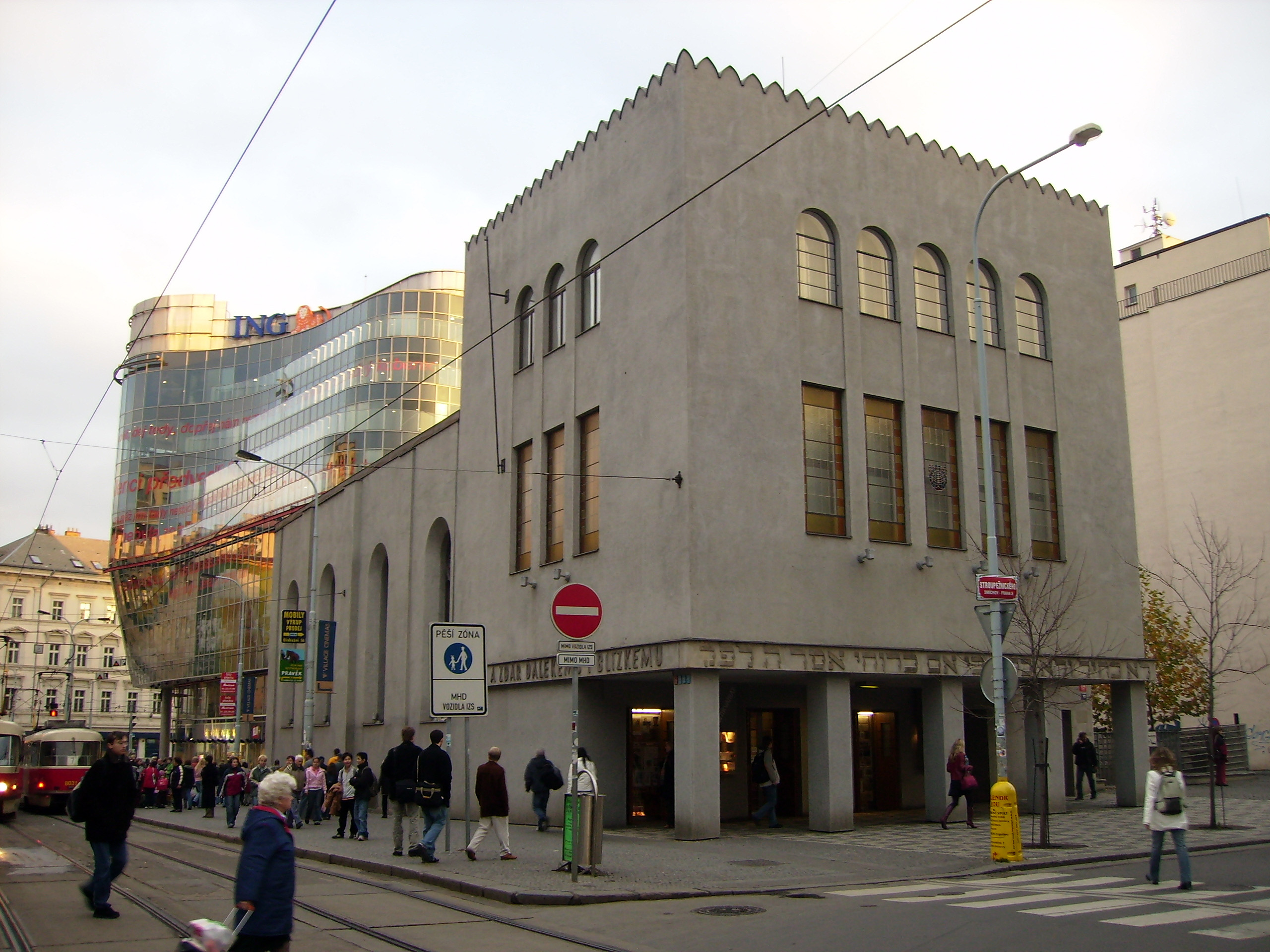
Front

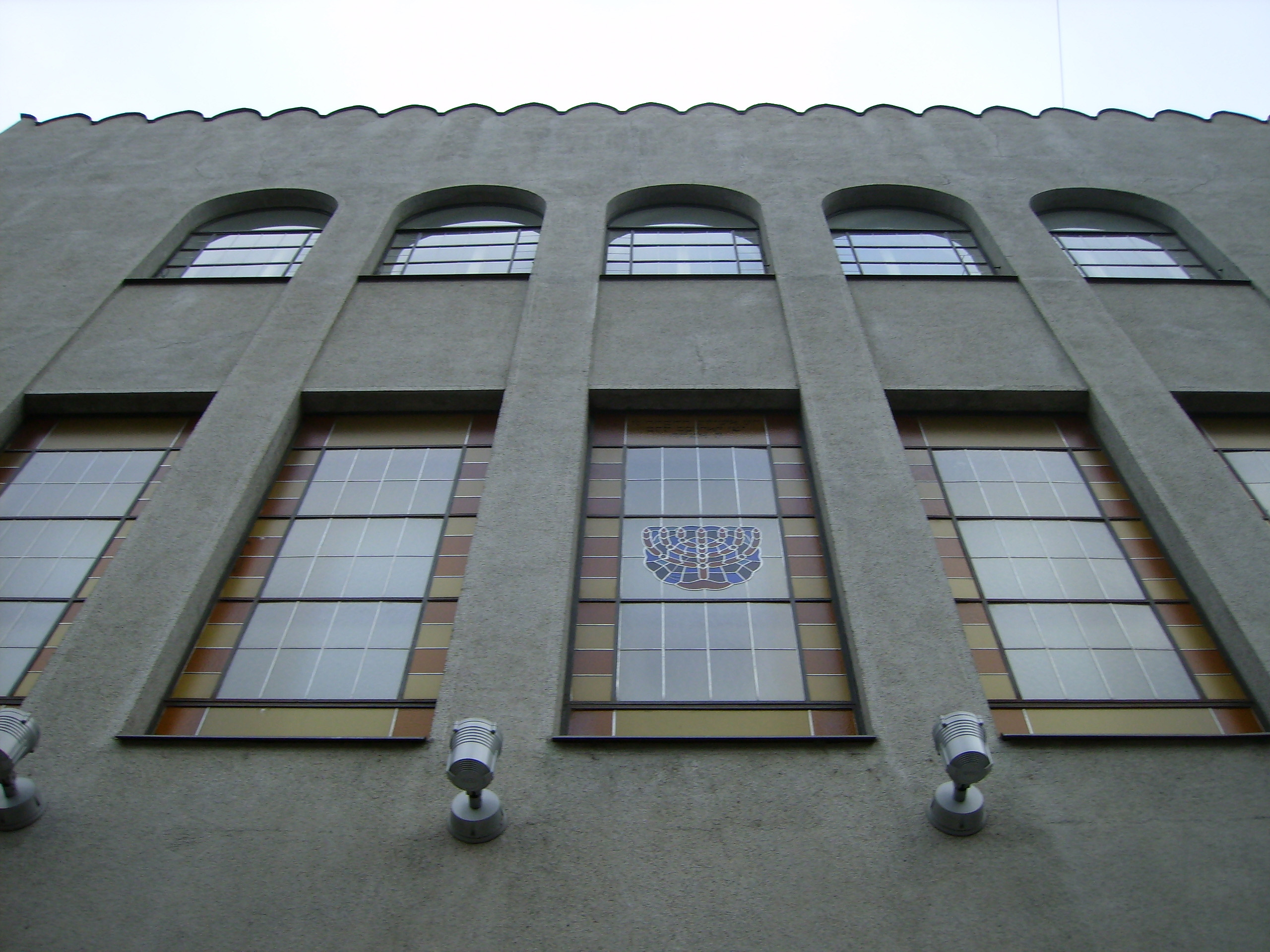
Another view of the building

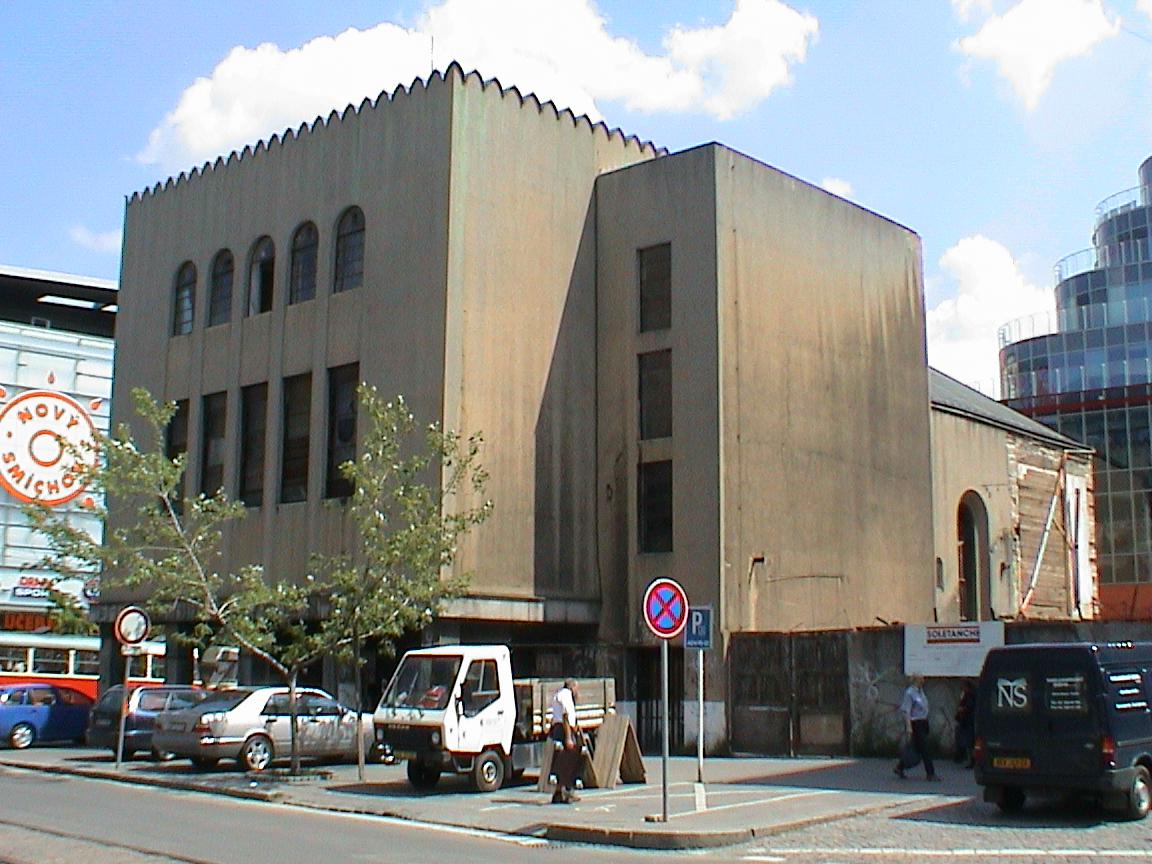
Synagogue in 2002

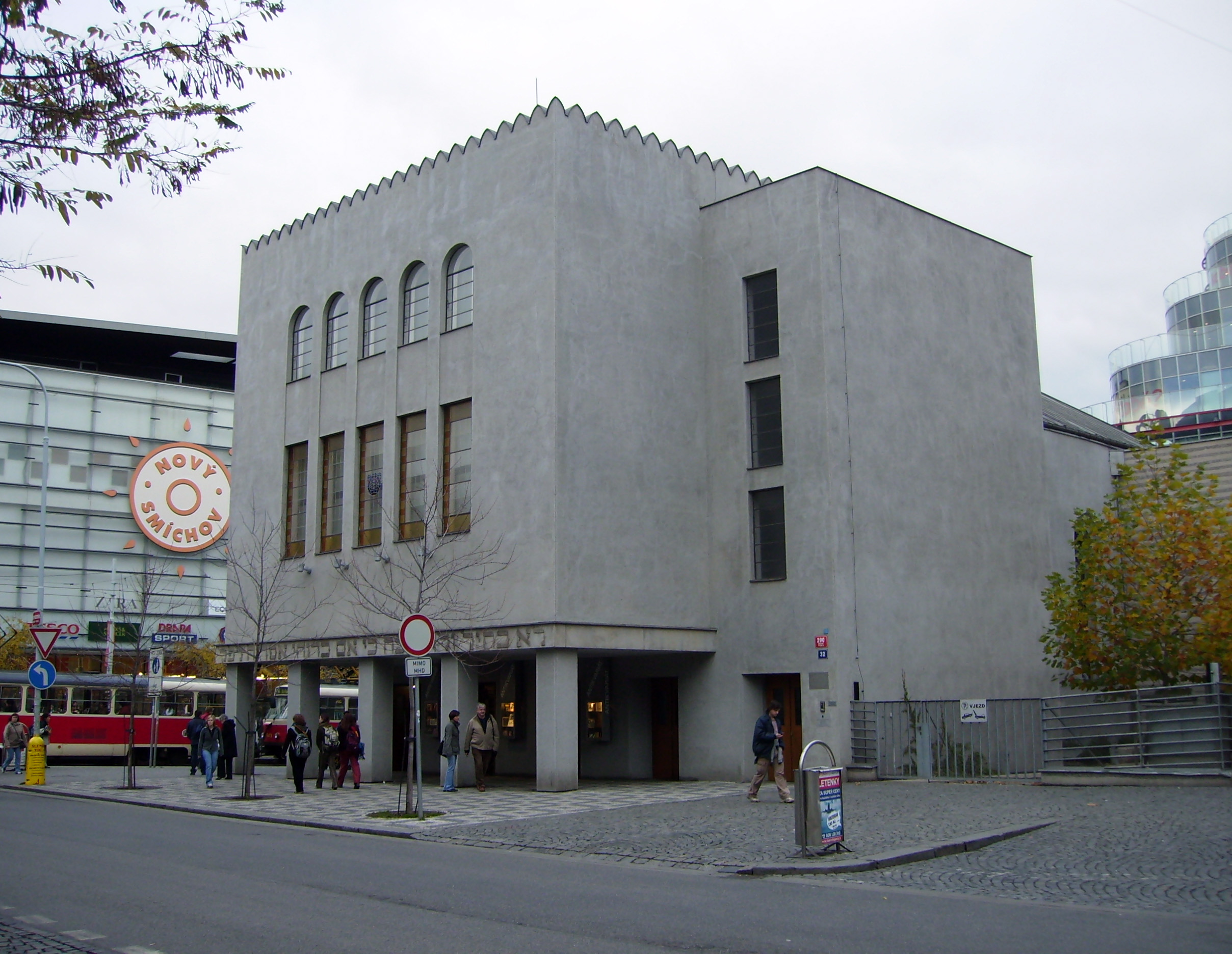
Synagogue in 2006

== See also ==
- History of the Jews in the Czech Republic
