= Jindřich Honzl =

Czech theatre director and theorist (1894–1953)

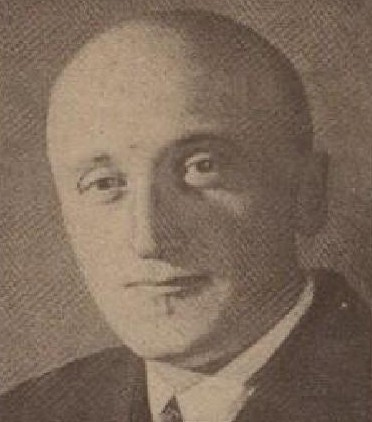
- Born: 14 May 1894; Humpolec, Bohemia, Austria-Hungary
- Died: 20 April 1953 (aged 58); Prague, Czechoslovakia

Signature
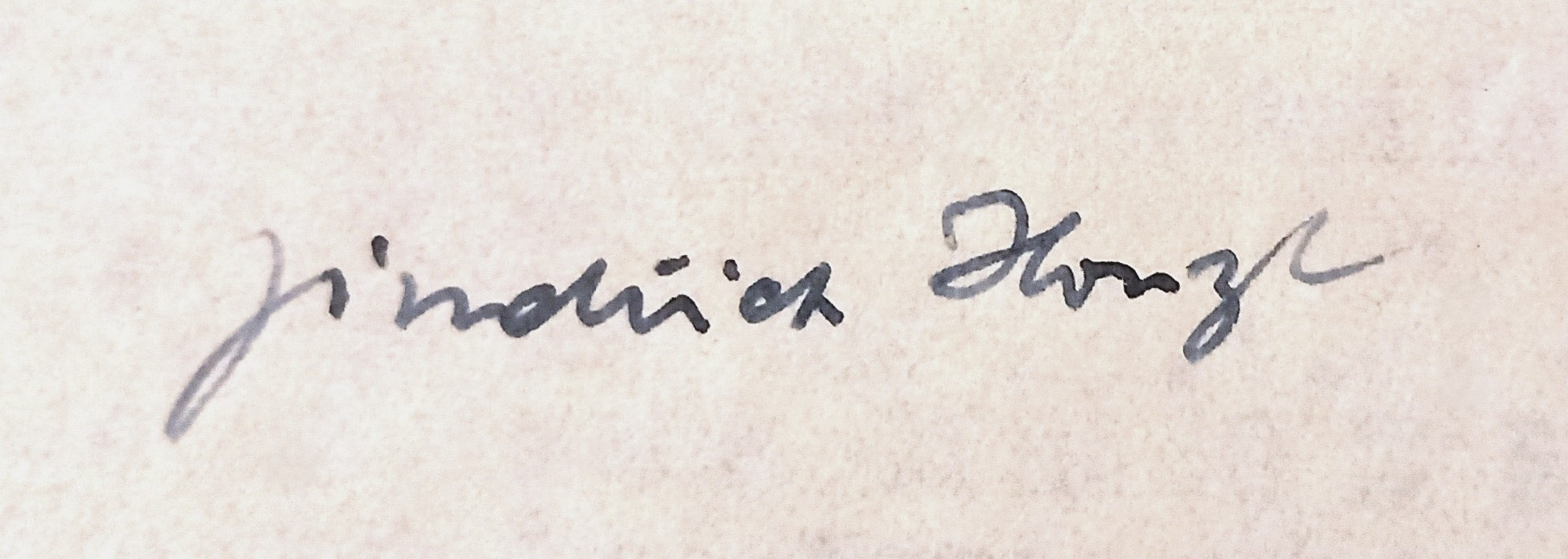

Jindřich Honzl (14 May 1894 – 20 April 1953) was a Czech theatre theorist, film and theatre director and pedagogue. He was a leading representative of Czech modern theatre.

== Biography ==
Honzl was born on 14 May 1894, in Humpolec in the family of a tailor and factory worker. In 1914 he graduated from pedagogical courses in Prague. From 1914 to 1927 he taught chemistry and physics at schools in Prague. After the end of World War I, he became active in politics and cultural issues and wrote the social democratic press. In his hometown, and his interest in theatre was stimulated by the amateur performances of the workers' association in the Na Kuchařově inn, where his mother performed.

From 1921, he was a member of the Communist Party of Czechoslovakia.

He devoted himself to theatre in the Dědrasbor (Workers' Drama Choir), which was a proletarian amateur theatre movement influenced by the Proletkult, and especially in Devětsil, in whose anthology he was able to publish his theoretical articles, which are generally taken as the beginning of the Czech theatrical avant-garde.

Already in 1926, together with Jiří Frejka and Emil František Burian, he opened the experimental theatre Osvobozené divadlo. At first, they presented productions drawn from French and Czech authors, and a year later, in 1927, they accepted George Voskovec and Jan Werich with their successful play Vest pocket revue which gave birth to the Czech avant-garde theatre.

From 1929 to 1931 he worked as a playwright and director of the Provincial Theatre in Brno. From 1931 to 1938 he worked at the National Theatre and the City Theatre in Plzeň. Honzl also took part in discussions about the Prague School, which was established in 1926 as the Prague Linguistic Circle.

During the German occupation of the Czech Republic in March 1939, directors such as Emil František Burian, Karel Dostal and Jiří Frejka tried to show public signs of resistance in their direction with hidden allusions, accent and stretching in language and simultaneous facial expressions and gestures that however, did not go unnoticed by informants. In 1939. Honzl was attacked for his work from the collaborationist press, and in 1941 he came to protest against the arrest of Burian.

After the Second World War he became a member of the National Theatre. In the period from July 1945 to July 1948, in parallel with his work in the National Theatre, he also managed the newly established Studio National Theatre, which he founded.

He staged plays by 19th century Czech authors in modern theatrical forms. In the 20th century as well as international writers such as Guillaume Apollinaire, Jean Cocteau and Alfred Jarry, took to the stage. The state demanded that more attention be paid to theatrical productions by contemporary Soviet authors and Honzl obliged in moderation.

From 1945 to 1946 he lectured on acting at the Department of Aesthetics (Department of History and Theatre Theory) and the Faculty of Philosophy of the Charles University. After the establishment of the Department of Theatre Studies at the university he is headed the academic seminar. From 1946 to 1953 he was a professor of theatre studies at the Theatre Faculty of the Academy of Performing Arts in Prague, and from 1951 to 1952 he held the position of head of the Department of Theatre Science and Dramaturgy. He also ran the magazine Soviet Theatre and worked in the theatre section of the Czechoslovak-Soviet Institute.

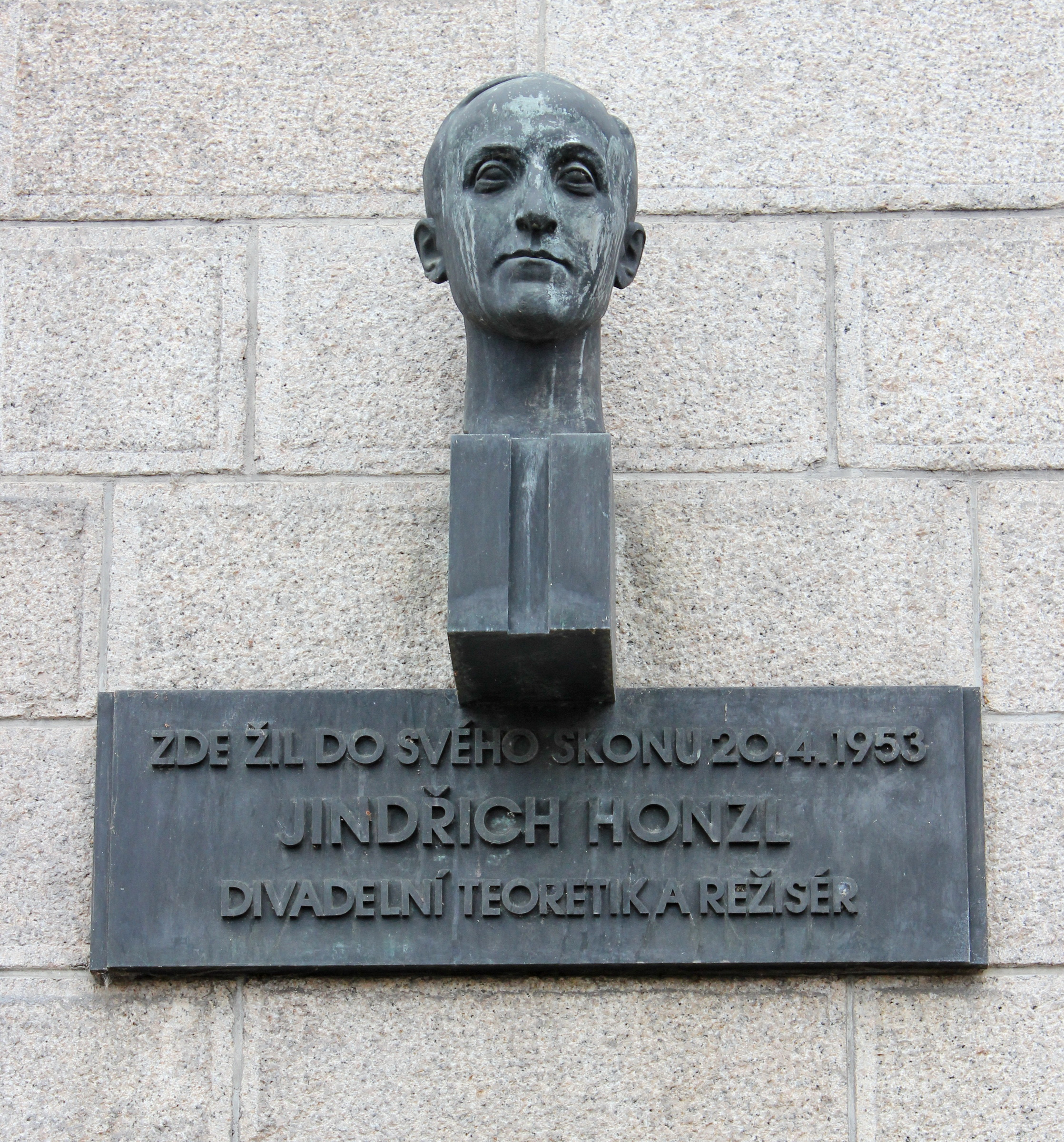
Memorial plaque of Jindřich Honzl at his former place of residence in Prague

He retired from director in the spring of 1950 and later resigned from his remaining posts. Honzl died on 20 April 1953 in Prague.

== Works ==
Honzl wrote texts on the theatrical theory of the avant-garde theatre and was initially influenced by surrealism, constructivism and dadaism. He was a leading figure in the left-wing Czech interwar avant-garde. As an artist and theorist, he actively influenced the development of socialist-oriented theatre. In his directing work, he was based on a specific acting expression and helped to develop the breadth of his means of expression. His theoretical works laid the foundation for a Marxist interpretation of theatrical science. After 1945, he contributed to the promotion of the ideological principles of Soviet theatre culture in Czech theatre.

=== Theoretical works ===
- Roztočené jeviště, 1925
- Vznik moderního ruského divadla, 1928
- K novému významu umění, 1956
- Základy praxe moderního divadla, 1963

=== Theatrical productions ===
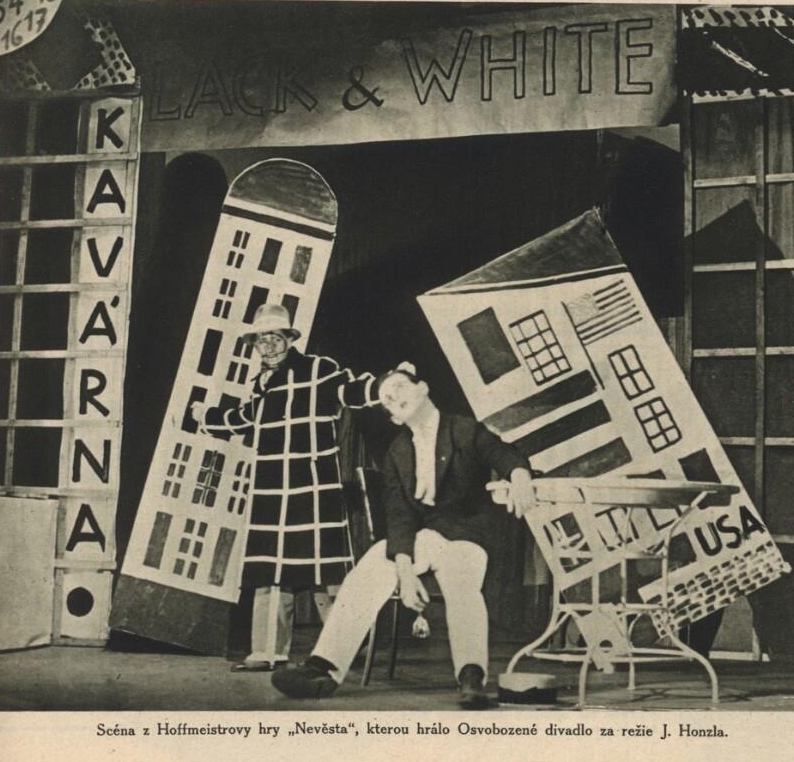
An Osvobozené divadlo play staged by Honzl in 1927

- Hadrián z Římsů zk, (by Vaclav Kliment Klicpera, 1930)
- Alchymista, (by Vladislav Vančura, 1932)
- Jan Hus, (by J. K. Tyl, 1936)
- Julietta, (by Bohuslav Martinů, 1938)
- Pražský žid, (J. J. Kolár – V. Vančura, 1946)
- Národní hrdina Julius Fučík, (1946)
- Ze života hmyzu (by Karel Čapek and Josef Čapek, 1946),
- Faidra, (by Jean Racine, 1947)
- Maryša, (Alois Mrštík a Vilém Mrštík, 1948)
- Maloměšťáci, (by Maxim Gorky, 1949)
- Josefina, (by V. Vančura, 1949)

== Filmography ==
- Pudr a benzin, 1931
- Peníze nebo život, 1932
- Dobrý vedoucí, 1939
