= Šmeral =

Šmeral is a surname. Notable people with the surname include:

- Bohumír Šmeral (1880–1941), Czech politician
- Vladimír Šmeral (1903–1982), Czech actor
