= Ivo Niederle =

Czech actor (1929–2021)

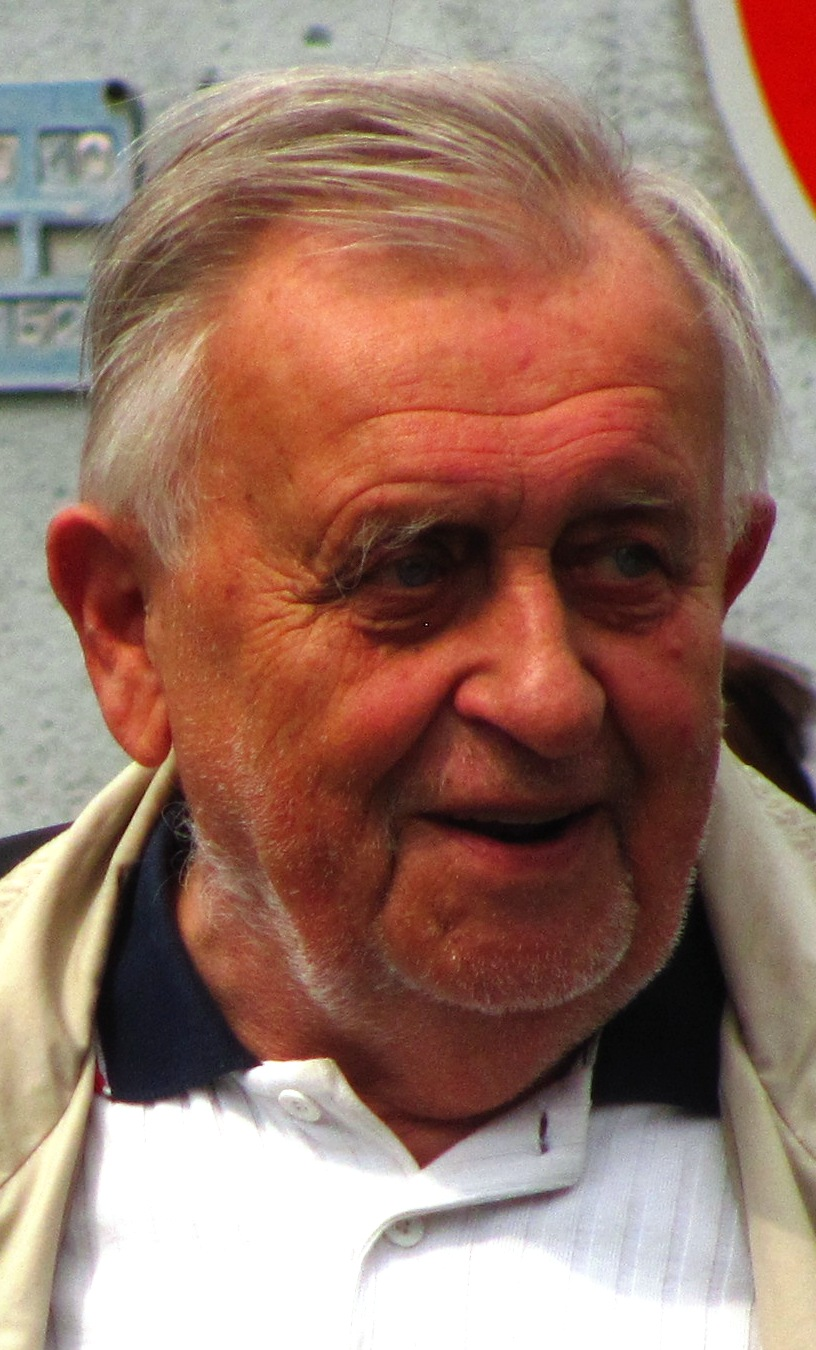
- Niederle in 2012
- Born: 26 December 1929; Prague, Czechoslovakia
- Died: 8 January 2021 (aged 91); Prague, Czech Republic
- Occupation(s): Actor, entertainer, commentator
- Years active: 1950–2017

Ivo Niederle (26 December 1929 – 8 January 2021) was a Czech actor, entertainer, and commentator.

== Biography ==
Niederle was born in 1929 in Prague. In 1953, he graduated in acting studies from the Theatre Faculty of the Academy of Performing Arts in Prague, until 1957 he played in the regional theater in Teplice, from 1957 he worked in the Werich Divadlo ABC, which in 1962 was transferred to the Municipal Theaters of Prague, where he played until the time of his retirement in 1991. During his life, he played in many film and television roles. Niederle also worked as a television commentator, entertainer and presenter.
