= Pudr a benzín =

1931 film

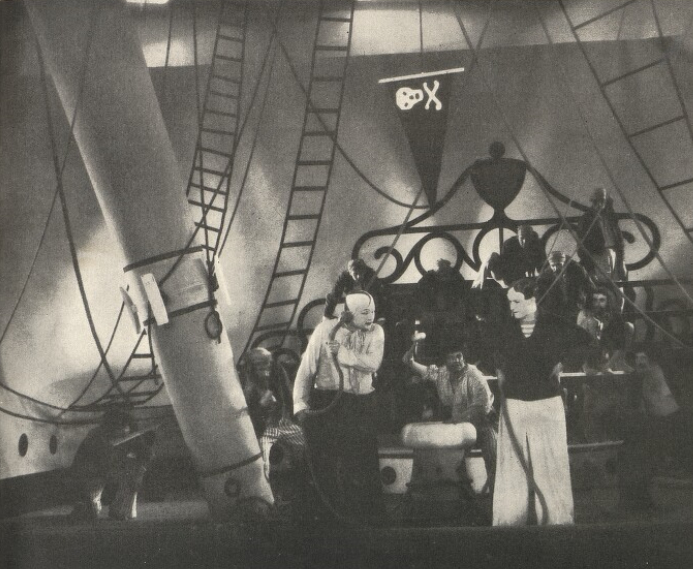
- A scene from the film
- Directed by: Jindřich Honzl
- Written by: Jan Werich; Jiří Voskovec
- Starring: Jan Werich; Jiří Voskovec; Ella Šárková; Bohuš Záhorský
- Cinematography: Václav Vích
- Music by: Jaroslav Jezek
- Release date: 1932
- Running time: 94 minutes
- Country: Czechoslovakia
- Language: Czech

Pudr a benzín is a Czech comedy film. It was released in 1931.
