= Werich =

Werich is a surname. Notable people with the surname include:

- Jan Werich (1905–1980), Czech actor, playwright, and writer
- Jana Werichová (1935–1981), Czech actress and translator

== See also ==
- 2418 Voskovec-Werich, a main belt asteroid
