= Drásov (Brno-Country District) =

- Market town
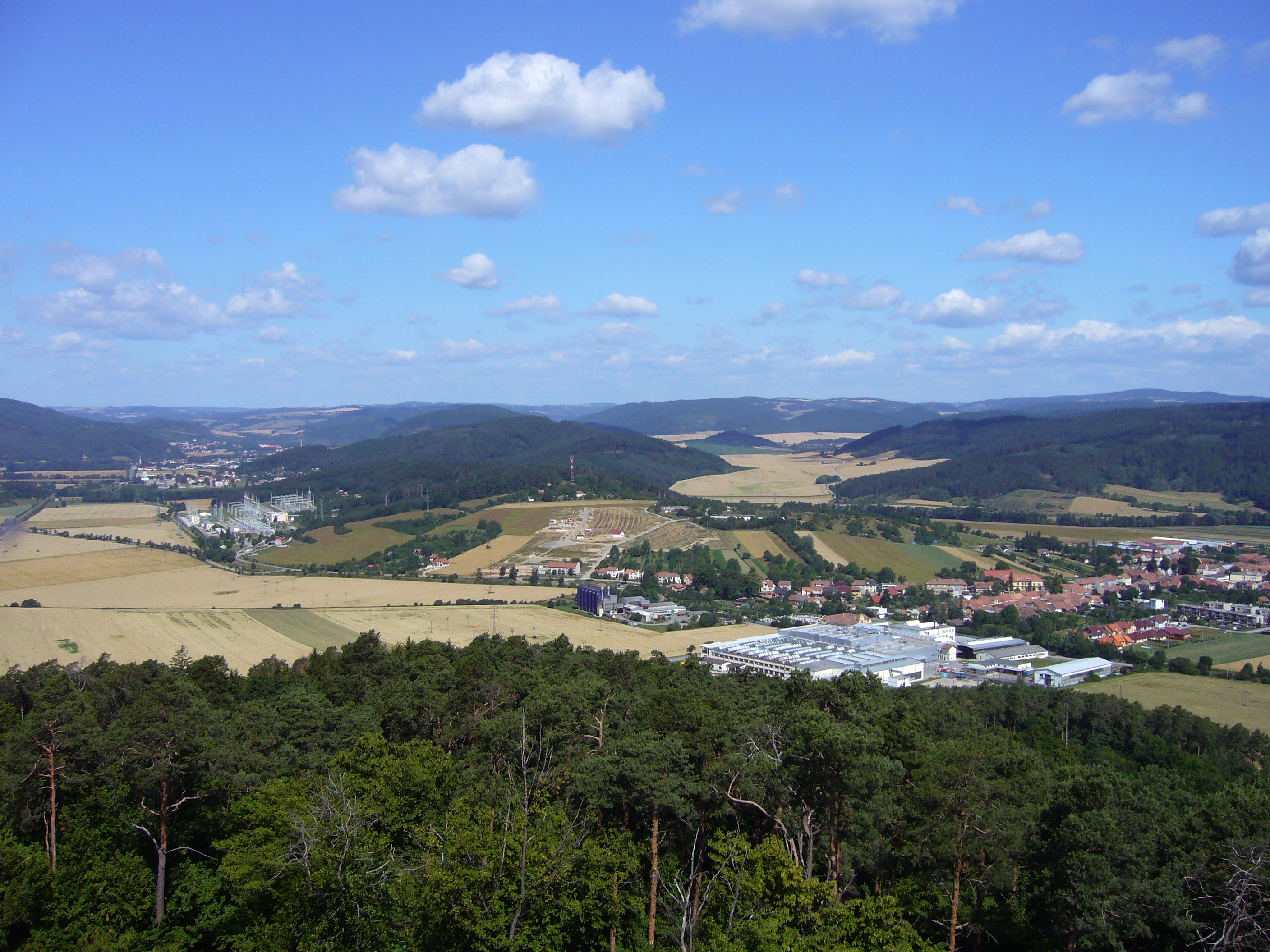
- Panorama of Drásov

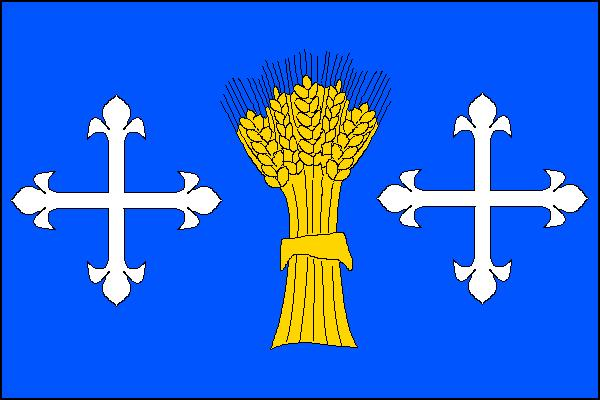
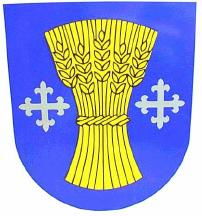
- Flag Coat of arms

- Location in the Czech Republic
- Coordinates: 49°19′55″N 16°28′41″E
- Country: Czech Republic
- Region: South Moravian
- District: Brno-Country
- First mentioned: 1238

Area
  - Total: 10.70 km^{2} (4.13 sq mi)
- Elevation: 270 m (890 ft)

Population (2026-01-01)
  - Total: 2,101
  - Density: 196.4/km^{2} (508.6/sq mi)
- Time zone: UTC+1 (CET)
  - Summer (DST): UTC+2 (CEST)
- Postal code: 664 24
- Website: www.drasov.cz

Drásov (Czech pronunciation: [ˈdraːsof]) is a market town in Brno-Country District in the South Moravian Region of the Czech Republic. It has about 2,100 inhabitants.

== Etymology ==
The name is derived from the personal name Drás, meaning "Drás' (court)".

== Geography ==
Drásov is located about 15 kilometres (9 mi) northwest of Brno. It lies mostly in the Boskovice Furrow, only the forested hills in the northwestern part of the municipal territory lies in the Upper Svratka Highlands. The highest point is a hill at 476 m (1,562 ft) above sea level.

== History ==
The first written mention of Drásov is in a deed of King Wenceslaus I from 1238. Drásov was known for its vineyards, which existed here until the 19th century, and for the mining of red sandstone in several quarries in the vicinity.

== Demographics ==
Historical population

Year	Pop.	±%
1869	642	—
1880	634	−1.2%
1890	650	+2.5%
1900	730	+12.3%
1910	738	+1.1%

Year	Pop.	±%
1921	823	+11.5%
1930	1,036	+25.9%
1950	942	−9.1%
1961	1,120	+18.9%
1970	1,096	−2.1%

Year	Pop.	±%
1980	1,116	+1.8%
1991	1,101	−1.3%
2001	1,164	+5.7%
2011	1,466	+25.9%
2021	2,022	+37.9%

Source: Censuses

== Transport ==
There are no railways or major roads passing through the municipality.

== Sights ==
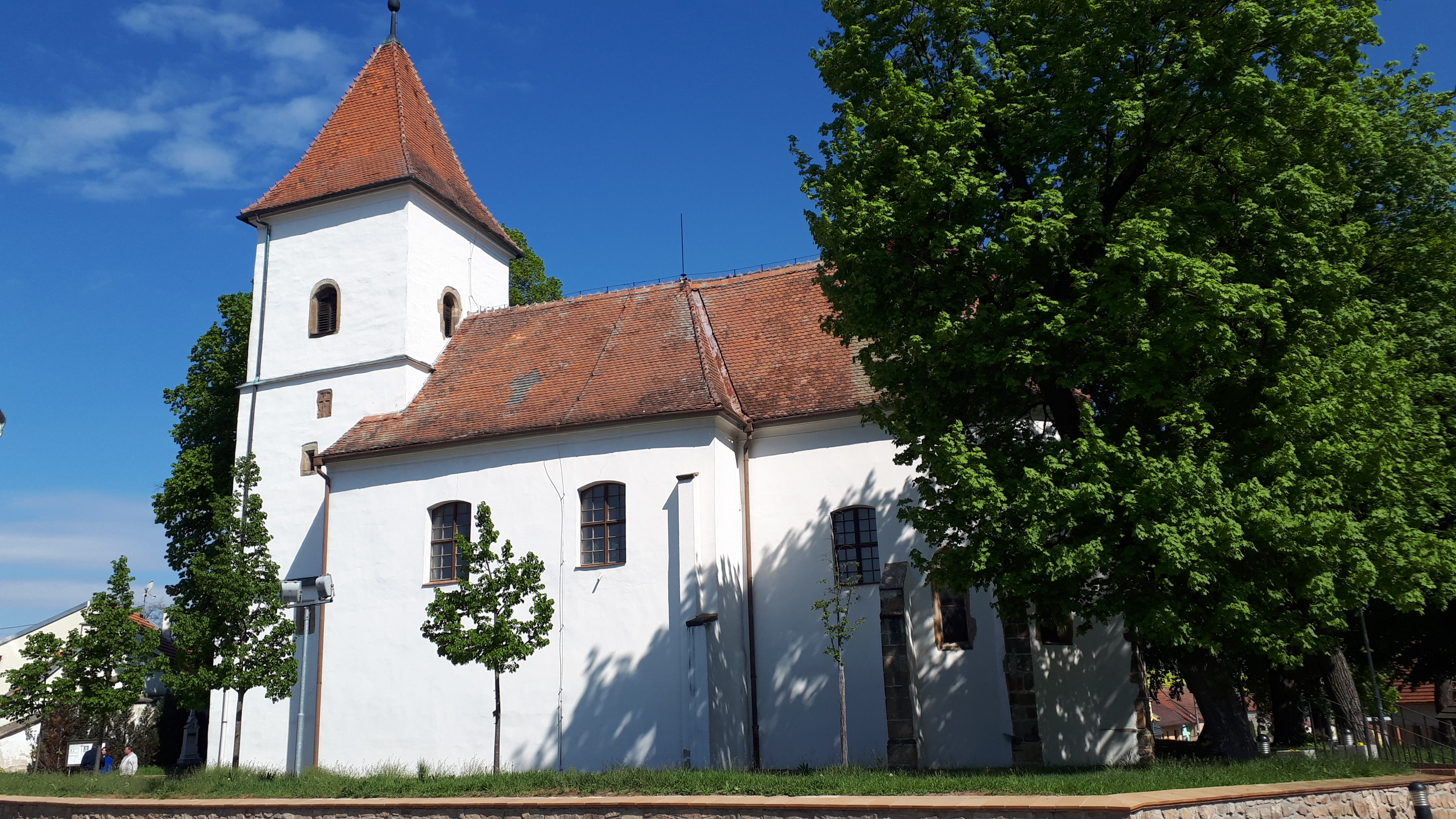
Church of the Exaltation of the Holy Cross

The main landmark of Drásov is the Church of the Exaltation of the Holy Cross. It is a medieval Gothic church with Baroque modifications. In the interior there are partly preserved Gothic wall paintings.

== Notable people ==
- Vladimír Šmeral (1903–1982), actor
- Michal Hašek (born 1976), politician, former mayor of Drásov
