= Osvobozené divadlo =

Former Czech theatre company

Liberated Theatre
- Osvobozené divadlo
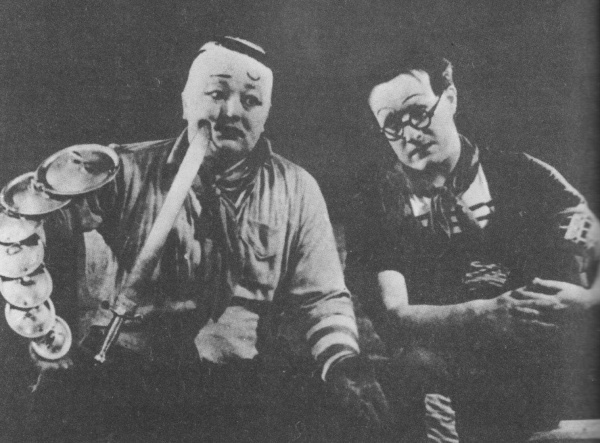
- Voskovec and Werich (1938)
- Interactive map of Liberated Theatre
- Address: Prague; Czech Republic
- Coordinates: 50°4′50.39″N 14°25′27.16″E

Construction
- Opened: 1926
- Closed: 1938

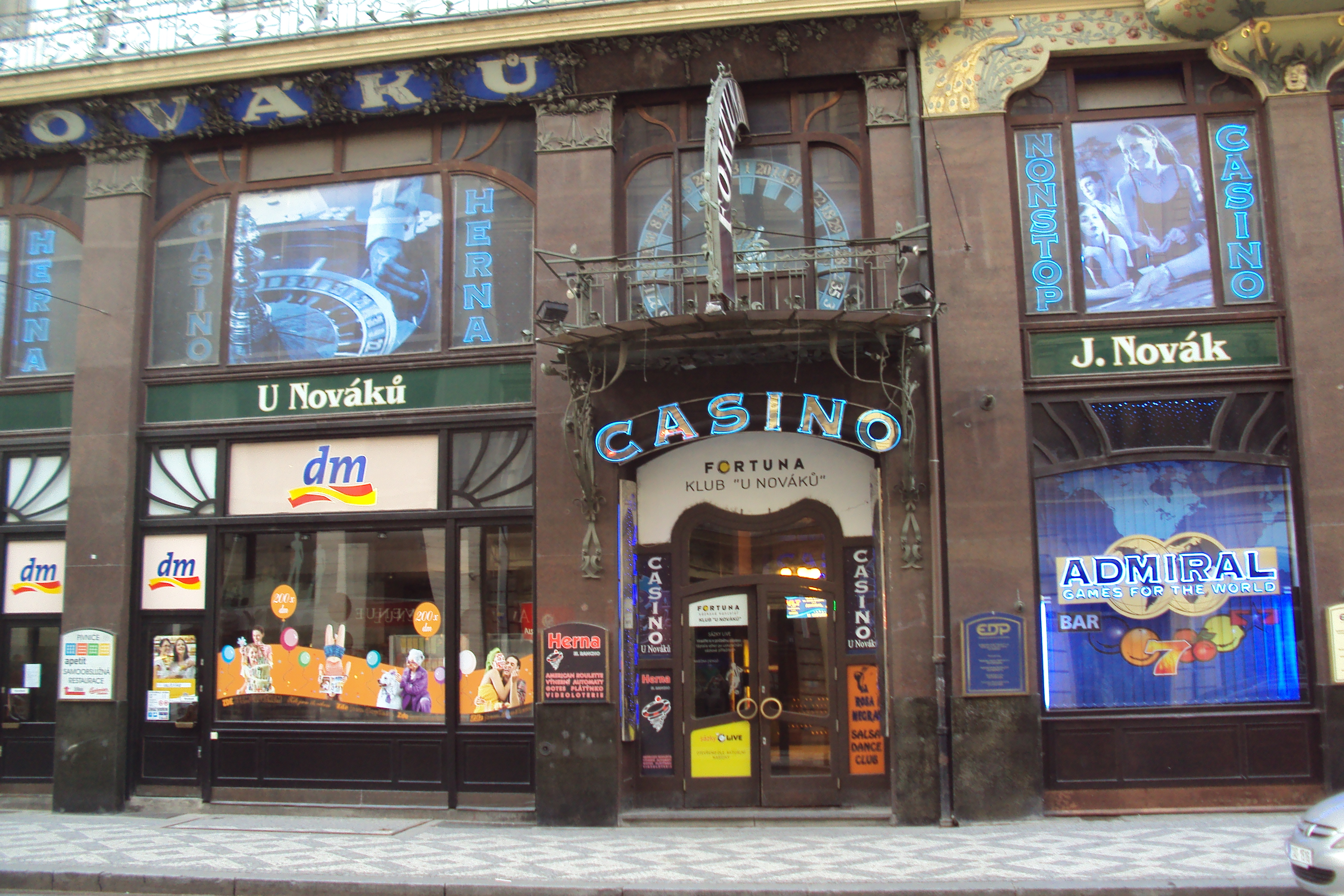
Liberated Theatre resided in U Nováků Palace up to 1935. Photo taken in 2011

Osvobozené divadlo (1926–1938) (Liberated Theatre or Prague Free Theatre) was a Prague avant-garde theatre scene founded as the theatre section of an association of Czech avant-garde artists Devětsil (Butterbur) in 1926. The theatre's beginnings were strongly influenced by Dadaism and Futurism, later by Poetism (a specific Czech art movement). The theatre was very leftist oriented, but it could also be critical of the Communists. One of the founders, Jiří Frejka, came up with the name in 1926. In the theatre both authorial plays and works by well-established modern authors; such as G. Apollinaire, A. Jarry, J. Cocteau, A. Breton, F. T. Marinetti, and V. Nezval were performed. The modern conception of the scene also laid more emphasis on lighting and the theatrical conception adjured more cooperation and contacts between actors and audience.

== History ==
=== Beginnings ===
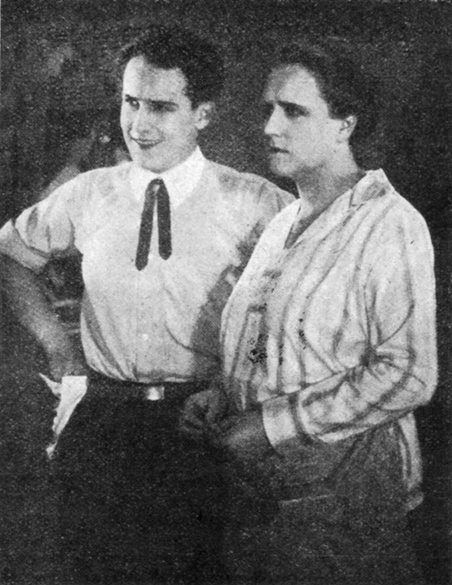
Jiří Voskovec (left) in the film Pohádka máje, 1926

The first performance took place on 8 February 1926 with the play Georges Dandin by Molière (it was renamed Cirkus Dandin), the performance was not very successful. In 1927 the theatre moved to Umělecká beseda and in that time Jiří Voskovec and Jan Werich first appeared on the stage with their own play Vest Pocket Revue, a montage of Dadaist gags, intellectual humour and jazz songs. The performance achieved great acclaim and Werich, together with Voskovec, became part of the ensemble. In the same year the young pianist and composer Jaroslav Ježek joined them, and together with Werich and Voskovec represented the core of the theatre group during its whole existence. They used masks inspired by the Fratellini clowns; Voskovec's mask was inspired by François Fratellini and Werich's by Albert Fratellini. Jiří Frejka together with another important exponent and founder, E. F. Burian, left the theatre due to disputes with the director Jindřich Honzl, an avant-garde theatre theorist who directed all the plays of the Osvobozené divadlo. The foursome (Voskovec, Werich, Ježek, and Honzl), but mainly Voskovec and Werich, gradually became the most important part of the group and their cooperation and contribution is still considered as very distinctive and legendary.

The performances of Osvobozené divadlo up to 1932 were predominantly of an entertaining character. The programme was rehearsed very loosely; it was based mainly on improvisation and was also dependent on reactions of the audience. V+W in their plays worked chiefly with historical themes and exotic places (plays Sever proti jihu, Golem, Nebe na zemi, Fata morgana, Ostrov Dynamit, Smoking Revue); the performances were richly accompanied by Ježek's jazz-influenced music and songs. In 1931 Ježek also established a partnership with Karel Ančerl, later chief of the Czech Philharmonic. Ančerl worked in the theatre as a conductor till 1933, and markedly improved the theatre orchestra.

Osvobozené divadlo also introduced so-called "forbíny" (from the German Vorbühne - forestage, front piece) - improvised dialogues on the forestage, often presenting topical reactions to political and cultural events and subjects.

In 1932 V+W came up with the first explicitly political play, Caesar. In that very successful play (191 reprises), the authors for the first time warned against the danger of Nazism, and the theatre began to be regarded as political. Another strongly anti-fascist play, Osel a stín (The Ass and the Shadow; 1933), was also very leftist-oriented. In 1934 Osvobozené divadlo began to present another play, Kat a blázen ("The Executioner and the Fool"), whose criticism of Nazism was very sharp, straight and consistent. The play had problems with censorship, and the German embassy lodged strong protests with the Umělecká beseda management. After continuing complaints from German officials Osvobozené divadlo was expelled from the Umělecká beseda building U Nováků Palace in 1935.

=== Spoutané divadlo ("The Tied Theatre") ===
The theatre was renamed after the expulsion to Spoutané divadlo and settled in the Rokoko Theatre in Wenceslas Square. In a one-year period the plays Balada z hadrů (play about F. Villon), Těžká Barbora etc. were created.

=== Osvobozené divadlo again ===
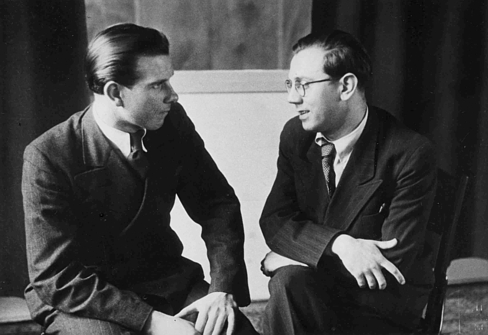
Jiří Traxler and Jaroslav Ježek (right) in 1938

In 1936, after the triumph of the play Balada z hadrů, Osvobozené divadlo came back to U Nováků Palace, but other anti-Nazi plays - Svět za mřížemi, Pěst na oko and above all Kat a blázen, whose performance led to demonstrations by the fascist element in the audience, led to a prohibition of all activities. The theatre was officially closed on 10 November 1938, and in January 1939 Voskovec, Werich and Ježek were forced to emigrate to the United States.

=== 1946-1948 ===
After World War II. Werich and Voskovec (Ježek died in 1942 in New York City) came back from exile and attempted to restore Osvobozené divadlo, but the social atmosphere in post-war Czechoslovakia was different and not very friendly towards their kind of satire. After the communist putch in 1948 occurred, Voskovec emigrated again and the activity of the theatre completely ceased.

== Significance ==
Osvobozené divadlo represented an important part of the Czechoslovakia First Republic cultural scene. It was the place where many theatre experiments occurred. Archive recordings of plays and particularly of Ježek's music and songs are popular and reissued till now.

== Significant personalities ==
- Jan Werich
- Jiří Voskovec
- Jaroslav Ježek
- Jindřich Honzl
- Jiří Frejka
- František Filipovský
- Václav Trégl
- Jindřich Plachta
- Vladimír Šmeral
- Bohuš Záhorský
- Blanka Waleská
- Miloš Nedbal
- Zdeněk Štěpánek
- Jan Pivec
- Emil František Burian
- Jiřina Štěpničková
- Jaroslav Rössler
- František Zelenka

== See also ==
- Dadaism
- Futurism
