= The World Is Ours (film) =

1937 film

- Directed by: Martin Frič
- Written by: Martin Frič; George Voskovec; Jan Werich
- Produced by: Josef Stein
- Starring: Jiří Voskovec
- Cinematography: Otto Heller
- Edited by: Jan Kohout
- Release date: 1937
- Running time: 96 minutes
- Country: Czechoslovakia
- Language: Czech

The World Is Ours (Czech: Svět patří nám) is a 1937 Czech comedy film directed by Martin Frič.

== Cast ==
- George Voskovec as Newspaper hawker (as Jiří Voskovec)
- Jan Werich as Newspaper hawker
- Bohus Záhorský as Dexler
- Vladimír Šmeral as Josef Forman
- Ladislav H. Struna as Holister
- Jaroslav Průcha as Antonín Hart
- Adina Mandlová as Markétka
- Miroslav Svoboda as Berger
- Frantisek Cerný as Bidon
- František Filipovský as Pinker
- Zdeněk Štěpánek as the Governor
- Karel Dostal as Secretary at the Noel's
- Emanuel Kovarík as an employee at the Noel's
- Jiří Hron as an employee at the Noel's
- Jarmila Svabíková as Workwoman at the Noel's
- Mirko Eliás as Workman at the Noel's
