= Leopold Ehrmann =

Czech architect (1886–1951)

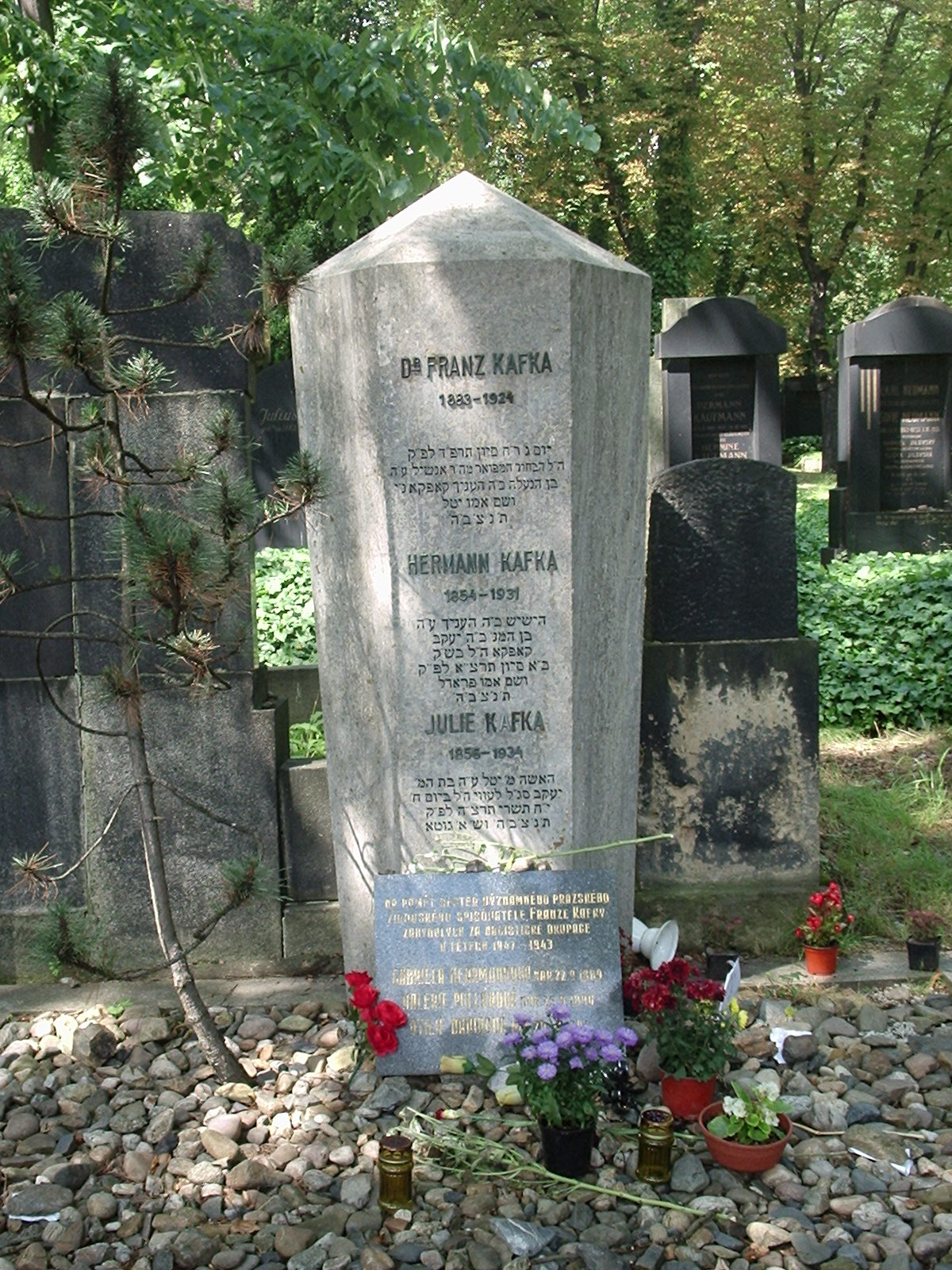
Franz Kafka's grave at New Jewish Cemetery in Prague-Žižkov designed by Ehrmann

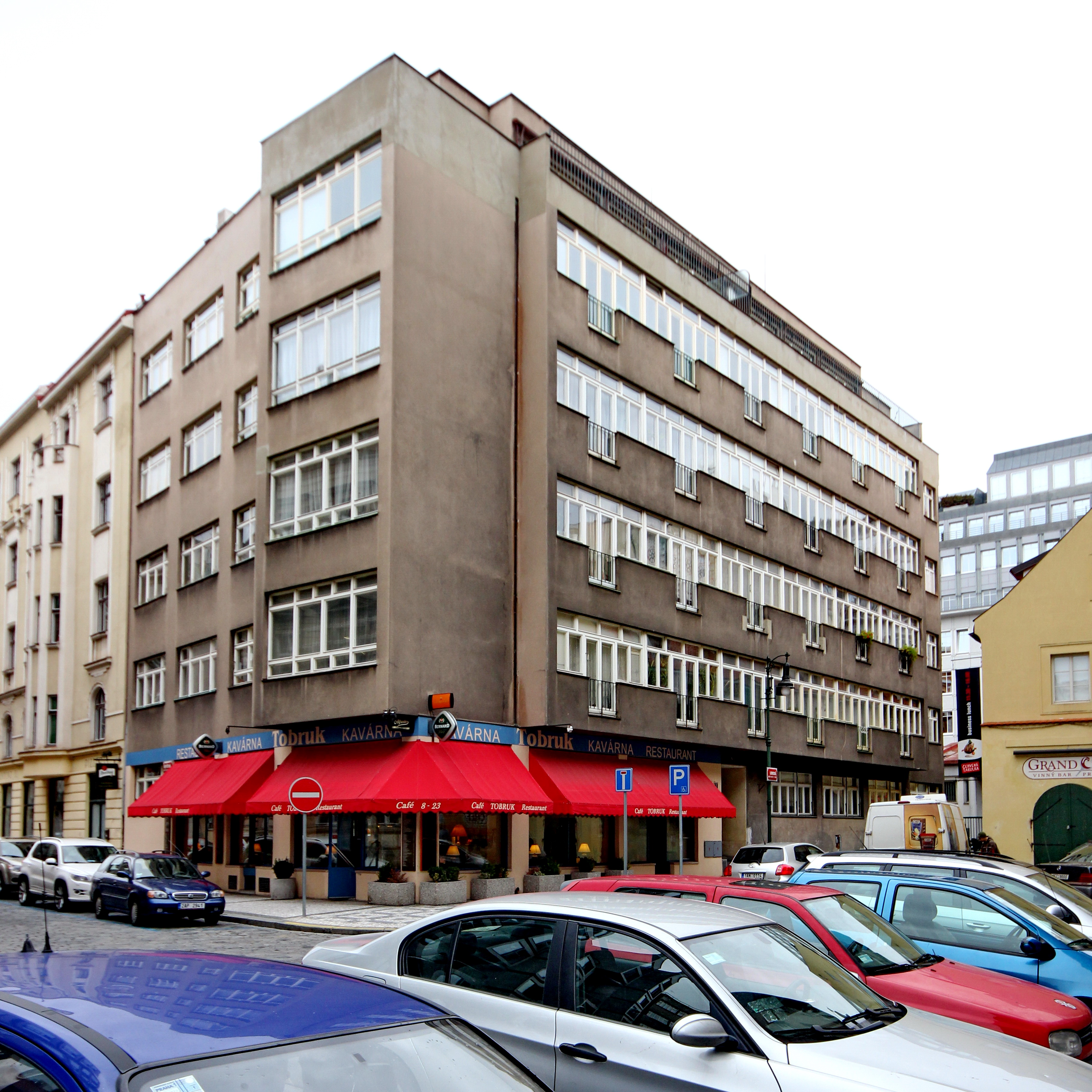
Apartment building, Lodecká, Prague, 1937–1938

Leopold Ehrmann (6 March 1886 – 11 April 1951) was a Czech architect of German ethnicity. He lived in Prague.

== Life ==
Ehrmann was born on 6 March 1886 in Strakonice in southern Bohemia, then part of Austria-Hungary, as a son of local haberdashery shop owner. He studied in Plzeň and Vienna and set up an architectural practice in Prague. His notable projects included works carried out for the Prague Jewish community: the synagogues in Prague Smíchov and Karlín, the gate house, columbarium and prayer hall at the New Jewish Cemetery and an apartment building in Prague's New Town worked on with František Zelenka. Ehrmann’s best-known work is the Cubist tombstone for Franz Kafka's family grave at the New Jewish Cemetery (1924). In 1940 Ehrmann and his wife immigrated to the United States and settled in Chicago where he died on 11 April 1951.
