= Vladimír Šmeral =

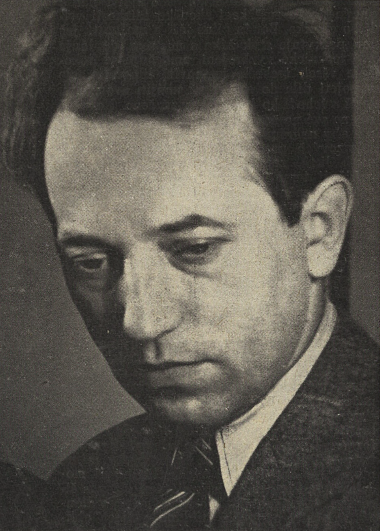
- At play Manon Lescaut 1940
- Born: 16 October 1903; Drásov, Austria-Hungary
- Died: 15 March 1982 (aged 78); Prague, Czechoslovakia
- Occupation: Actor
- Years active: 1926–1979

Vladimír Šmeral (16 October 1903 – 15 March 1982) was a Czech actor.

== Life ==
Šmeral was born on 16 October 1903 in Drásov, Moravia, Austria-Hungary. He started acting in Zemské divadlo in Brno. He moved to Prague and acted in Liberated Theatre, E. F. Burian's theatre and Divadlo na Poříčí. His wife was Jewish, but he refused to divorce her in order to protect her during the World War II. He had an affair with his theatre co-star Adina Mandlová, who became pregnant.

In 1944 he was sent to a concentration camp in Wrocław. Mandlová was sending him packages with food. In December 1944 she suffered a miscarriage. Šméral managed to escape from the camp and Mandlová help to hide him in a hospital. After the war he was active in many National Front organizations, as a member of the Czechoslovak Communist Party. He became an actor in Vinohrady Theatre and taught at the Theatre Faculty of the Academy of Performing Arts in Prague.

He died on 15 March 1982 in Prague. He is buried at the Vyšehrad Cemetery.

== Selected filmography ==
- Skeleton on Horseback (1937)
- The World Is Ours (1937)
- Jan Cimbura (1941)
- Mist on the Moors (1943)
- Rozina, the Love Child (1945)
- The Heroes Are Silent (1946)
- Čapek's Tales (1947)
- Silent Barricade (1949)
- The Great Opportunity (1950)
- Hotel for Strangers (1966)
- The End of Agent W4C (1967)
- Larks on a String (1970)
- Witchhammer (1970)
- Všichni proti všem (1977)
