= Bohuš Záhorský =

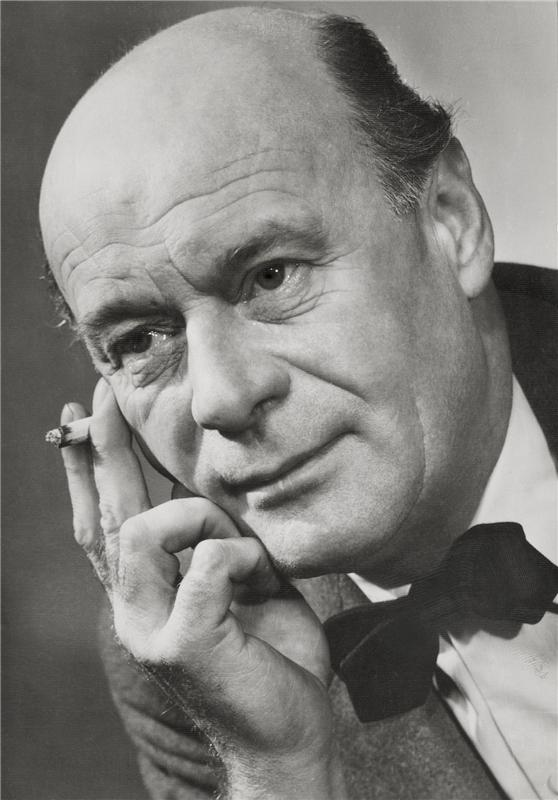
- Born: 5 February 1906; Prague, Bohemia, Austria-Hungary
- Died: 22 September 1980 (aged 74); Prague, Czechoslovakia
- Occupation: Actor
- Years active: 1932–1980

Bohumil "Bohuš" Záhorský (5 February 1906 – 22 September 1980) was a Czech actor. He appeared in more than one hundred films from 1932 to 1980.

== Selected filmography ==
Year	Title	Role	Notes
1937	Poslíček lásky		
1951	The Emperor and the Golem		
1960	Higher Principle		
1964	Lemonade Joe		
1966	Happy End		
1968	Capricious Summer		
