= George Voskovec =

Czech-American actor (1905–1981)

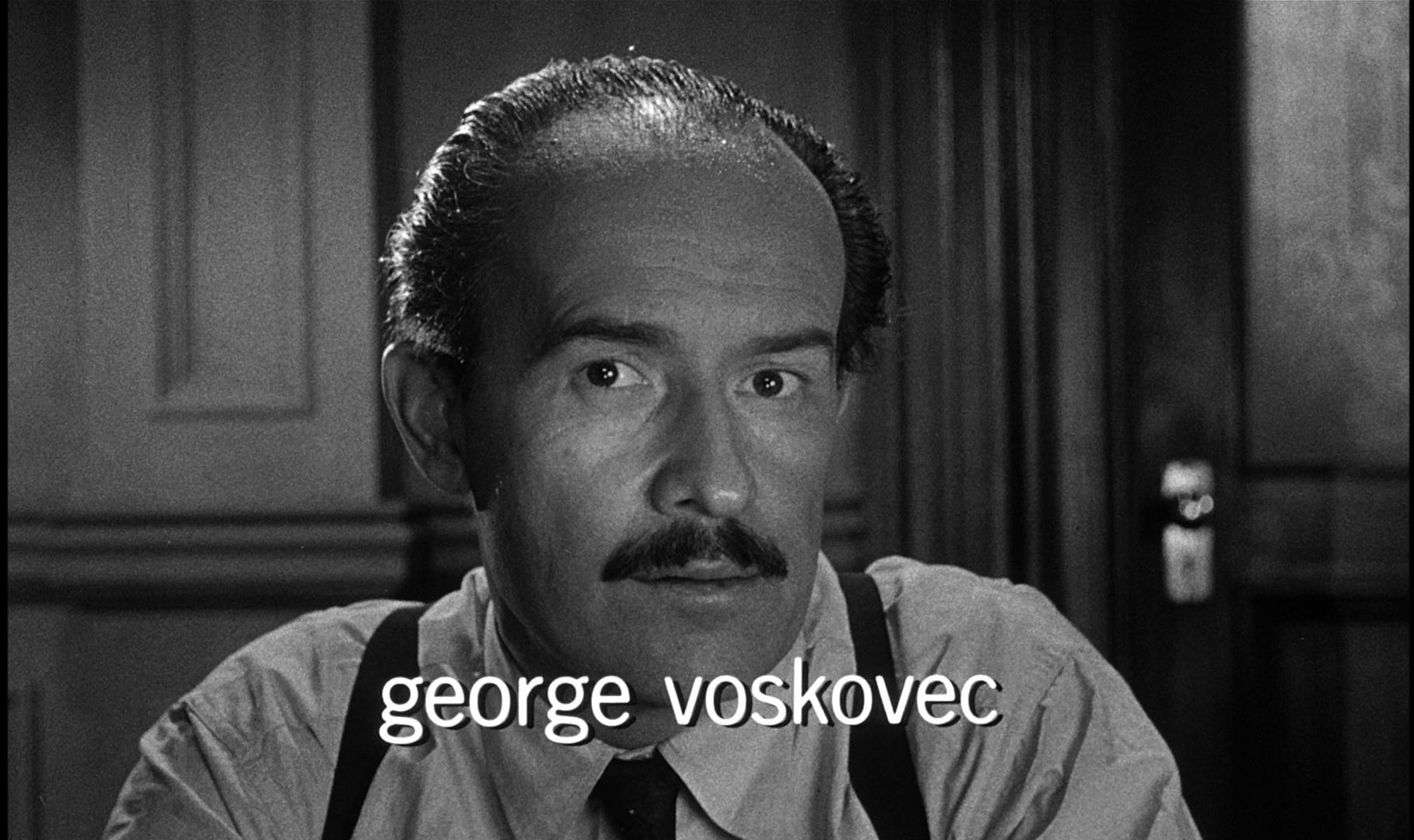
- Voskovec in 12 Angry Men (1957)
- Born: Jiří Wachsmann; June 19, 1905; Sasau, Bohemia, Austria-Hungary
- Died: July 1, 1981 (aged 76); Pearblossom, California, U.S.
- Resting place: Olšany Cemetery, Prague
- Citizenship: Czechoslovakia (until 1955); United States (from 1955)
- Occupation: Actor
- Years active: 1926–1981
- Spouses: Madelaine Main (div. 1945); Anne Gerlette (m. 1945; d. 1958); Christine McKeown (m. 1961)
- Children: 2

Jiří Voskovec (Czech pronunciation: [ˈjɪr̝iː ˈvoskovɛts]) (born Jiří Wachsmann; June 19, 1905 – July 1, 1981), known in the United States as George Voskovec, was a Czech-American actor. Throughout much of his career, he was associated with actor and playwright Jan Werich. In the U.S., he is known for his role as the polite Juror #11 in the 1957 film 12 Angry Men.

== Life and career ==
Voskovec was born as Jiří Wachsmann in Sázava in Bohemia to Jiřina Valentina Marie (née Pinkasová) and Václav Vilém Eduard (né Voskovec; later Wachsmann). He had two siblings, Mrs. Olga Adriena Kluckaufová and Dr. Prokop Voskovec. His granduncle was Bedřich Wachsmann and his cousin was Alois Wachsman, both painters and architects. Another uncle was Austrian painter Julius Wachsmann (1866–1936). He immigrated to the US in 1939 and again in 1948 with the onset of the National Socialist and Stalinist regimes, respectively, in Czechoslovakia.

He attended school in Prague and Dijon, France. In 1927, together with Werich, he joined the Osvobozené divadlo (Liberated Theater), which had been created two years earlier by members of the avant-garde Devětsil group, Jiří Frejka and Jindřich Honzl. After disagreements led Frejka to leave the group in 1927, Honzl asked Voskovec and Werich, both law students who had created a sensation with their Vest Pocket Revue that year, to join the theatre. When Honzl, who had directed their productions, left in 1929, Voskovec and Werich took control of the theatre and changed its name to the Liberated Theatre of Voskovec and Werich, assuming all responsibility for direction, writing, librettos, and other artistic decisions.

The Liberated became a center for Czech clownery, a reaction to contemporary political and societal problems. Their performances began with the primary goal of evoking laughter through fantasy, but with the changing political situation in Germany their work became increasingly anti-fascist, which led to the closure of the Liberated Theater after the Munich Agreement in 1938.

Both Voskovec and Werich fled to the United States in early 1939. For the rest of his life, Voskovec lived primarily in the United States, interrupted only by brief stays in Czechoslovakia in 1948 and in France from 1948 to 1950. Until the mid-1940s, Voskovec worked and wrote mostly with Jan Werich, but after Werich's return to Socialist Czechoslovakia, they met only a few more times. After his return to the United States in 1950, Voskovec was detained at Ellis Island for eleven months for his alleged sympathy for Communism.

Although Voskovec lived in three countries and his maternal grandmother was French, he always maintained that "I am a born and bred Czech." He was also of Jewish descent. In 1955, he became an American citizen.

Voskovec acted in 72 movies. Only the first five of these were Czech; the rest being American or British. His most famous American movie role was the polite Juror #11 in 12 Angry Men (1957), in which being a European immigrant to the US was central to his role. His other famous films included The Spy Who Came in from the Cold (1965) and The Boston Strangler (1968), as renowned psychic Peter Hurkos. His last movie was Barbarosa (1982), with Willie Nelson and Gary Busey.

In 1975, he published the Czech spoken LP record "Relativně vzato", where he reflects on his life and world in general. A sleeve note for this LP was written by another notable Czech émigré, author Josef Škvorecký. Voskovec also appeared in the 1978 television film The Nativity and the 1980 film Somewhere in Time, starring Christopher Reeve and Jane Seymour. In 1981, he played Fritz Brenner in the NBC TV series Nero Wolfe with William Conrad as Wolfe.

Voskovec starred on Broadway in 1961 along with Hal Holbrook in Do You Know the Milky Way by German playwright Karl Wittlinger. In 1964, he appeared in an episode of The Fugitive.

== Death ==
Voskovec died in 1981 of a heart attack in Pearblossom, California, at the age of 76.

Minor planet 2418 Voskovec-Werich discovered by Luboš Kohoutek is named after him and Jan Werich.

== Selected filmography ==
- The May Fairy (1926) - Ríša
- Ve spárech upíra (1927)
- Paní Katynka z Vaječného trhu (1929) - Iškariot
- Pudr a benzín (1932) - Driver
- Peníze nebo život (1932) - Pepík
- Workers, Let's Go (1934) - Filip Kornet, Shuffer
- The World Is Ours (1937) - Newspaper hawker
- Anything Can Happen (1952) - Pavli
- Affair in Trinidad (1952) - Doctor Franz Huebling
- The Iron Mistress (1952) - John James Audubon
- Studio One
  - "Twelve Angry Men" (1954, TV episode) - Juror No. 11
- Studio One
  - The Judge and His Hangman (1955, TV episode) - Von Schwendi
- 12 Angry Men (1957) - Juror No. 11
- The 27th Day (1957) - Prof. Klaus Bechner
- Uncle Vanya (1957) - Voinitsky (Uncle Vanya)
- The Bravados (1958) - Gus Steinmetz
- Wind Across the Everglades (1958) - Aaron Nathanson
- BUtterfield 8 (1960) - Dr. Tredman
- Hamlet (1964) - Player King
- The Spy Who Came in from the Cold (1965) - East German Defense Attorney
- Mister Buddwing (1966) - Shabby Old Man
- The Desperate Ones (1967) - Doctor
- The Boston Strangler (1968) - Peter Hurkos
- The Iceman Cometh (1973) - Piet Wetjoen
- Man on a Swing (1974) - Dr. Nicholas Holnar
- The Nativity (1978) - Joachim
- Somewhere in Time (1980) - Dr. Gerald Finney
- Barbarosa (1982) - Herman Pahmeyer (final film role)
