= Jan Werich =

Czech actor, playwright, and writer (1905–1980)

- Born: Jan Křtitel František Serafínský Werich; 6 February 1905; Prague, Kingdom of Bohemia, Austria-Hungary
- Died: 31 October 1980 (aged 75); Prague, Czechoslovakia
- Occupations: actor, playwright and writer

Jan Werich (Czech: [ˈjan ˈvɛrɪx]; 6 February 1905 – 31 October 1980) was a Czech actor, playwright and writer.

== Early life ==
Between 1916 and 1924, Werich attended reálné gymnasium (equivalent to high school) in Křemencova Street in Prague (where his future business partner, Jiří Voskovec, also studied). He studied law at the Charles University Law School from 1924 to 1927, from which he made an early departure to begin his artistic career and forge one of the most important partnerships of his life.

== Career ==
He was an actor, and writer. He moved to the USA after WW2 started with Jiří Voskovec, and later returned to Prague without him because Voskovec decided to stay.

=== Theater ===
His collaboration with Jiří Voskovec and Jaroslav Ježek lasted for more than 10 years. Their partnership was a platform for their numerous left-wing political satires, most notably in the Osvobozené divadlo (Liberated Theatre). The trio's work took inspiration from Dada, with its love of the absurd, a reaction against bourgeois values and the horrors of World War I.

In the years leading up to World War II and the closure of Czechoslovak theatres, Werich, Voskovec and Ježek were forced into exile in the United States in 1938, where Voskovec and Ježek remained for the rest of their lives. Werich returned to his homeland five years later, and started a partnership with Miroslav Horníček. He also worked with famous puppeteer Jiří Trnka to write modern fairy tales. With his new business partner Miroslav Horníček at his side, he re-staged many of the plays he had created with Voskovec in the 1930s but set them in the political content specific to the time.

=== Film ===
Jan Werich appeared in such films as Byl jednou jeden král (English: Once Upon a Time There Was a King), which was released in 1955, and made many political compromises to appease the Communist censors. From the creation of the ABC Theatre he moved to the City Theatres of Prague and then to the Musical Theatre of Karlin and Nusle.

Werich was originally cast by producer Harry Saltzman to play Ernst Stavro Blofeld in the 1967 James Bond film You Only Live Twice. Upon his arrival at the Pinewood set, both producer Albert R. Broccoli and director Lewis Gilbert felt that he was a poor choice, resembling a "poor, benevolent Santa Claus". Nonetheless, in an attempt to make the casting work, Gilbert continued filming. After several days, both Gilbert and Broccoli determined that Werich was not menacing enough, and recast Blofeld with Donald Pleasence in the role.

== Politics ==
Jan Werich signed the pro-reform manifesto 2000 Words in 1968. After the Soviet invasion of 1968, he and his wife immediately fled to Vienna along with many other Czechs at the time. After long deliberations he realized he had to go back, saying that his "home was his castle" and realizing that if he stayed abroad he would never work again. He returned to Czechoslovakia in early 1969. Werich met with Voskovec for the very last time in Vienna, Austria in 1974. He had limited opportunities to perform in public until his death in 1980. His last public appearance was in Prague's Lucerna in 1977.

He did not sign the Charter 77 proclamation, organized by Václav Havel, but in the end he succumbed to pressure from the Communist authorities and in order to be able to work again, publicly proclaimed his full loyalty to the regime, by attending "Anti-charta77" meetings and even signing a petition denouncing Charter 77. He later claimed he was tricked into signing and that he did not really know what his signature was for, as the original attendance document signed open entry was potentially substituted for a later "declaration of faith".

== Death ==
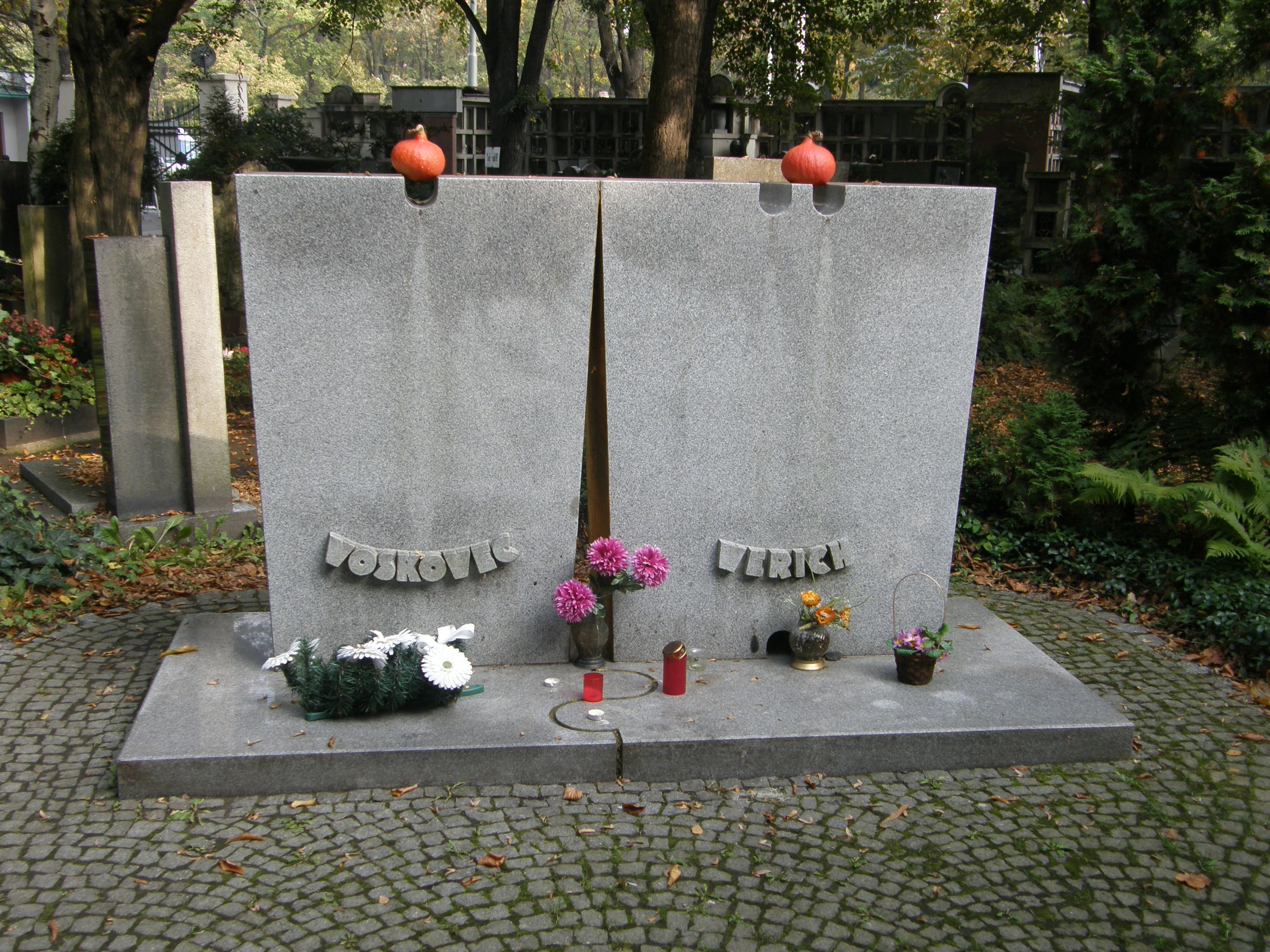
Tombstone of Voskovec and Werich at Olšany Cemetery in Prague

Werich died on 31 October 1980 at the age of 75.

Minor planet 2418 Voskovec-Werich discovered by Luboš Kohoutek is named after him and George Voskovec.

== Works ==
=== Theatre ===
(in cooperation with Jiří Voskovec)

- Vest Pocket Revue - 1927
- Smoking Revue - 1928
- Si pořádně zařádit (Having a Spree) - 1928; based upon Nestroy's Einen Jux will er sich machen
- Gorilla ex Machina - 1928
- Kostky jsou vrženy (The Dice are Cast) - 1929
- Premiéra skafandr (The Diving Suit) - 1929
- Líčení se odročuje (The Trial is Adjourned) - 1929
- Fata Morgana - 1929
- Ostrov Dynamit (Dynamite Island) - 1930
- Sever proti Jihu (North Against South) - 1930
- Don Juan and Co. - 1931
- Golem - 1931
- Caesar – 1932
- Robin zbojník (Robin Hood) - 1932
- Svět za mřížemi (A World Behind Bars) - 1933 (script collaboration also with Adolf Hoffmeister)
- Osel a stín (Ass and Shadow) - 1933
- Slaměný klobouk (The Straw Hat) - 1933; based upon Labiche's The Italian Straw Hat
- Kat a blázen (Executioner and Fool) - 1934; an anti-fascist work and critique (the German Embassy protested that this play insulted their head of state, and as a result, Werich and Voskovec were expelled from the theatre "U Nováků")
- Vždy s úsměvem (Keep Smiling) - 1934
- Panoptikum (The Wax Museum) - 1935
- Balada z hadrů – (Rag Ballad) - 1935; draws from the works of François Villon.
- Nebe na Zemi (Heaven on Earth) - 1936; based on Fletcher's The Spanish Curate
- Rub a líc (Heads or Tails) - 1936; later made into the Svět patří nám film
- Panorama - 1937
- Těžká Barbora – (Heavy Barbora) - 1937; depicts a conflict between two fictional nations, Eidamští ("Edams") and Yberlandští ("Yberlanders"), the latter attacking the former, the former then employ two soldiers (Werich and Voskovec), that build a cheese canon (Těžká Barbora)
- Pěst na oko – (A Fist in the Eye) - 1938; humans refuse to take a lesson from history and constantly repeat the same mistake
- Divotvorný hrnec - (The Wondermaking Pot) - 1946; a musical comedy based on Finian's Rainbow by 'Yip' Harburg and Fred Saidy

=== Films ===
- Pudr a benzín – 1931 (Powder and Gas)
- Peníze nebo život – 1932 ((Your) Money or (Your) Life; a Czech threat used by violent robbers)
- U nás v Kocourkově – 1932 (In Our Kocourkov; Kocourkov is a fictitious "town of fools", Czech equivalent to Gotham)
- Hej rup! – 1934 (the name is an exclamation or command to pull, "Heave-ho", in English also distributed under title Workers, Let's Go)
- Svět patří nám – 1937 (The World Belongs to Us)
- Падение Берлина (Pád Berlína) - 1949 (The Fall of Berlin; as Hermann Göring in a USSR production made in Prague)
- Císařův pekař a pekařův císař – 1951 (The Emperor and the Golem)
- Tajemství krve – 1953 (The Secret of Blood)
- Byl jednou jeden král – 1954 (Once Upon a Time, There Was a King...)
- Vzorný kinematograf Haška Jaroslava – 1955 (An Exemplary Cinematograph of Jaroslav Hašek; a tongue-in-cheek title)
- Hudba z Marsu – 1955 (Music from Mars; a cameo appearance as one of the people in the audience)
- Stvoření světa – 1957 (The Creation of the World; animated French/Czech classic narrated by Werich in rhymes)
- Baron Prášil – 1961 (a Czech take on Baron Munchausen)
- Až přijde kocour – 1963 (The Cassandra Cat)
- Šest otázek pro Jana Wericha – 1964 (Six Questions for Jan Werich)
- Pan Tau a Claudie – 1970 (Mister Tau and Claudia)
- Muž, který rozdával smích – 1970 (The Man Who Spread Laughter)
- Pan Tau a cesta kolem světa – 1972 (Mister Tau and the Journey Around the World)
- Hledá se pan Tau – 1972 (Mister Tau Is Being Sought)
- Dva mrazíci (The Two Frosts)

=== Television works ===
- Medvěd – 1961 (The Bear)
- Slzy, které svět nevidí – 1962 (The Tears That the World Sees Not)
- Kočár nejsvětější svátosti – 1962 (The Carriage of the Most Holy Sacrament)
- Uspořená libra – 1964 (A Saved Pound); based upon A Pound on Demand by Seán O'Casey
- Král a žena – 1967 (The King and a Woman)
- Magnetické vlny léčí (Magnetic Waves Cure)

=== Literary works ===
- Fimfárum - fairy tales not only for children
- Italské prázdniny (Italian Holliday)
- Potlach
- Falstaffovo babí léto
- Lincoln 1933
- Povídky nejen o psech - published posthumously, a revival of his former wish to write a story book about dogs. There were not enough stories however and so it was renamed and other stories were added - some of them have been previously published and some are originals, from manuscripts and letters.
