= Milan Křížek =

Czech composer, music teacher and viola player

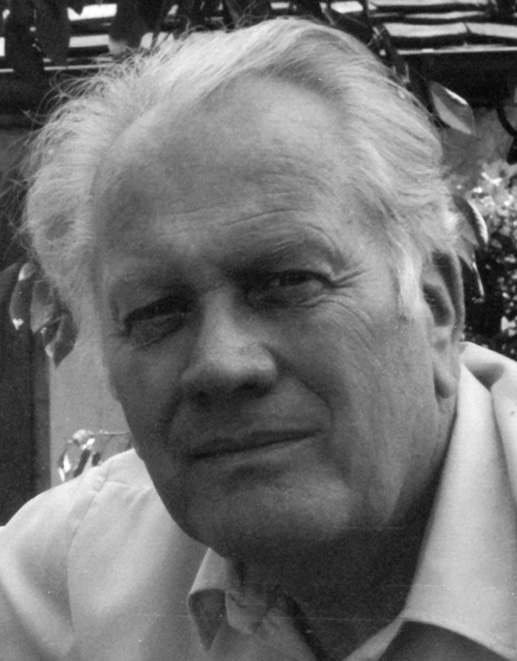
- Milan Křížek, 1986
- Born: 9 March 1926; Lišov, Czechoslovakia
- Died: 15 February 2018 (aged 91); České Budějovice, Czech Republic
- Occupation(s): Composer, music teacher and viola player
- Era: Contemporary

Milan Křížek (Czech pronunciation: [ˈmɪlan ˈkr̝̊iːʒɛk]; 9 March 1926 – 15 February 2018) was a Czech composer, music teacher and viola player.

== Life ==
After graduating from the secondary grammar school in Tábor (1937–1945), he studied musicology, music education and history at the Faculty of Arts of Charles University in Prague (1946–1951). He privately studied composition under Jaroslav Řídký (1946–1950). In 1959 he passed the state examination in violin. Křížek became Doctor of Philosophy at Palacký University, Olomouc, 1971: his postgraduate research was undertaken externally at the Institute of Musicology of the Czechoslovak Academy of Sciences (1966–1972; awarded Candidate of Sciences in 1975).

After finishing his university studies, he taught music education at the Pedagogical Grammar School in Znojmo (1950–1951). On his return from compulsory military service he moved to České Budějovice, where he started to teach at the Music School (1953–1956), then at the Pedagogical School (1956–1958). He also helped to popularise music generally. In 1959 he became assistant professor at the Department of Music of the Faculty of Education. In 1991 the faculty became one of the founding constituent parts of the University of South Bohemia in České Budějovice. He continued working in the Department of Music until his retirement in 1986. After the political changes of 1989 he was appointed associated professor (1990).

During 1990-2001, Křížek taught the theory of music and composition at the Conservatoire in České Budějovice. Until 1992 he was also employed as violist in the Opera Orchestra of the South Bohemian Theatre, in the South Czech Philharmonic Orchestra and in several other chamber ensembles.

His compositions have their roots in neoclassicism. His later works explore new compositional techniques. His works incline to the synthesis of the means of modern musical language. The South Czech Philharmonic Chamber Orchestra performed the premiers of Variations on a theme of Alban Berg (1985), Concerto for orchestra (1988), Concerto for 14 string instruments (1998) and other works. A selection of his works has often been included in the Days of Contemporary Music in Prague: Sonata for viola solo (1996), Sonatina danzante for flute and clarinet (2000), Seven sequences for clarinet and percussions (2002), Capriccia for soprano, flute, viola and percussion on verses of Konstantin Biebl (2005), Largo desolato for violin, viola and violoncello (2010) and Collage IV for 3 violoncellos (2012).

His music scores are deposited in the archives of the Czech Music Fund, at the Museum of South Bohemia, in the archives of the South Czech Philharmonic and at the Conservatoire in České Budějovice.

== Selected works ==
=== Orchestral music ===
- Divertimento I for string orchestra (1983)
- Variations on a theme of Alban Berg (1984)
- Concerto for orchestra (1987)
- Concerto grosso for violin, viola and orchestra (1989)
- Divertimento II for orchestra (1992)
- Concerto for 14 string instruments (1995)
- Divertimento III for string orchestra (2002)
- Concertino for clarinet, strings and harp (2003)
- Concerto for violin and orchestra (2010).

=== Chamber music ===
- Preludium and giga for oboe and piano (In memory of Jan Dismas Zelenka) (1959)
- Partita parva for 2 violins (1973)
- It was love: variations on a Moravian song for flute, violoncello and piano (1976)
- Musica brevis for 3 violoncellos (1987)
- String quartet I for 2 violins, viola and violoncello (1988)
- Partita for violin and piano (1993)
- Collage I for 4 flutes (1995)
- Trio for clarinet, violoncello and piano (1996)
- Sonata a due for violin and viola (1997)
- Sonatina danzante for flute and clarinet (1999)
- Good King Wenceslas (variations on English carol for violin, clarinet and piano) (2000)
- Seven sequences for clarinet and percussions (2001)
- Collage III for 2 violins and viola (2003)
- String quartet II (Epitaph for 2 violins, viola and violoncello with baritone solo) (2008)
- Largo desolato: Preludium-Interludia-Postludium for violin, viola and violoncello (2009)
- Collage IV for 3 violoncellos (2011)
- String quartet III (2014)
- Diaphonia, viola and violoncello (2017).

=== Instrumental ===
- Trifolium memoriae Bélae Bartók for piano (1965)
- Strophes for clarinet solo (1978)
- Sonata I for unaccompanied violin (1982)
- Passacaglia for violoncello solo (1988)
- Aulétés (fluteplayer) oboe solo (1992)
- Sonata for unaccompanied viola (1994)
- Sonata II for unaccompanied violin (1998)
- Cantus variabilis for unaccompanied violin (2006)
- Soliloquia for unaccompanied violin (2009)
- Sonata quasi una ballata (violoncello solo) (2012)
- Sonata III for unaccompanied violin solo (2013)
- Diferencias, viola sola (2014).

=== Vocal and choral works ===
- Child (diptych for women's chorus) (1960)
- Points (four songs on texts of Miroslav Holub for middle voice and piano) (1965)
- Three madrigals on old Czech texts for women's chorus, flute, violin and percussion (1979)
- Elegiac fragments for middle voice and viola (1994)
- Noctiluca (4 nocturna pro střední hlas, flétnu, violu a kytaru) (1998)
- Capriccia for soprano, flute, viola and percussions on verses of Konstantin Biebl (2005)
- Butterflies do not live here (children's chorus on verses of Pavel Friedman, Theresienstadt Ghetto 4.6.1942) (2006)
- Two sonnets (2017).

=== Literary works ===
Book

- Jan Rychlík, the life and work of a composer (1st ed. Prague: H&H, 2001, 190 s. ISBN 80-86022-89-7). (Czech)

Other

- Music life of South Bohemia (České Budějovice 1989) (Czech)
