= Jan Rychlík =

Czech composer

Jan Rychlík

Jan Rychlík (27 April 1916 – 20 January 1964) was a Czech composer and music theorist. He was one of the most important exponents of the Czech New Music in the 1950s and 1960s.

== Biography ==
Rychlik was born and died in Prague. His parents wanted him to study economics, but he was attracted by the music and foreign languages from an early age. In 1939, during the German occupation of Czechoslovakia he began to study at the Prague Conservatory. Later he became a pupil of Jaroslav Řídký, and in 1946 he graduated from the Master School of Composition in Prague.

He collaborated with the Gramoklub Orchestra and also played drums with the early Karel Vlach Orchestra. In addition to his drumming abilities, he was an excellent pianist and also played some other instruments.

At the beginning of his career he composed mainly popular dance songs; however, in 1943 he has created first chamber compositions, such as Sonatine for Clarinet and Piano and Sonatine for Piano. Shortly afterwards he focused also on orchestral compositions.

Following World War II he devoted himself mainly to film music. He composed the score for the well-known musical comedy Limonádový Joe aneb Koňská opera. Some of the songs from the film became evergreens ("Arizona" and "So far"). He is also known as the author of the music for the French film La Création du Monde by Jean Effel.

Jan Rychlík died at the age of 48. Following his death, Czech composer Otmar Mácha composed a memorial work, Variations on a Theme and on the Death of Jan Rychlík, for symphonic orchestra.

== Style ==
Rychlík's music output has two different poles, much like the works of Jaroslav Ježek and Erwin Schulhoff. In his early works he was inspired mainly by jazz and swing music. In the post-war years he developed the original "art music technique", which he applied mainly in his chamber compositions. He asserted himself also as a film composer. In his last creative period he achieved highly original musical expression using some elements of the post-war music avant-garde and the Second Viennese School.

Rychlík was also a skilful percussionist and often performed with Czechoslovak jazz ensembles. As a music theorist, he published several treatises on jazz, such as "Pověry a problémy jazzu" (Superstitions and Problems of Jazz) and "Moderní instrumentace" (Modern Instrumentation). He composed jazz and popular songs and short chamber compositions, mainly for wind instruments.

His musical language is clear, laconic, natural, and witty. His works were reasonably popular and Rychlík was hardly able to satisfy all requests for new compositions.

== Selected compositions ==
Orchestral

- Symphonic Overture (1944) 9'
- Concerto Overture for large orchestra (1947) 13'
- Partita giocosa for brass orchestra (1947) 17'
- Pictures and Humours. Children's suite for 10 instruments (1953) 22'

Compositions for solo instruments

- Four Partitas for solo flute (1954), ČHF, ČHF, SNKLHU 27'
- Four Studies for solo flute (1954), ČHF, Pa 10'
- Burlesque Suite for solo clarinet (1956), Pa 8'
- Hommagi gravicembalistici. Suite for harpsichord (1960), ČHF, Su, o Su 8'

Compositions for two instruments

- Family Music for flute and clarinet (1950) 10'
- Etudes for English horn and piano (1953), SNKLHU 8'
- School Sonatina for French horn and piano (1953), Su, o Pa 9'
- Arabesques for violin and piano (1955) 16'

Compositions for ensembles (3 – 9 musicians)

- Suite for wind quintet (1946) 20'
- Trio for clarinet, trumpet and bassoon (1948) 15'
- Divertimento for 3 double basses (1952) 12'
- Trio for violin, viola and violoncello (1953) ČHF, EBP 31'
- Chamber Suite for string quartet (1954), ČHF, SNKLHU, o Su 21
- Serenade (Memoirs) for wind octet (1957), ČHF 27'
- Wind Quintet (1960), SHF, o Su 16'
- African Cycle for 8 wind instruments and piano (1961), SHV, o Su 14'
- Relazioni. Chamber cycle for alto flute, English horn and bassoon (1963–64), ČHF, Pa, o Su 7'

Vocal compositions

- Shepherds, Awake. Cantata-carol for solos, choir and orchestra, to words of folk poetry (1945–46) 5'
- South Bohemian Songs and Ditties, for male and female voices with the accompaniment of violin, clarinet and bass clarinet (1948), Su 15'
- On the Sick Harry. Children's choir a cappella, to the words of Josef Hiršal (1949)
- Pastoral Heraldings. Children's chorus a cappella (1949)
- Two Mixed Choruses a cappella, to the words by A. S. Pushkin: 1. Heavy Cloud, 2. The Nightingale (1952)
- A Bunch of Patriotic Songs for tenor, violin, oboe, viola and violoncello. Arrangements of the songs of the 19th century (1955)
- 7 Choruses from Sophocles Oedipus, for mixed choir a cappella (1962), ČHF
- Gallows Madrigals for chamber mixed choir a cappella to the words by Ch. Morgenstern, translated into Czech by Josef Hirsal (1962), ČHF
- Sneers for children's choir and small instrumental ensemble, on popular texts (1962)

Instructive pieces

- Pupils' Sonatine for French horn and piano (1960)

Film music

- Music from Mars - feature film (directors Ján Kadár - Elmar Klos, 1953)
- Café on the Main Street - feature film (dir. Miroslav Hubáček, 1953)
- Hurvínek Circus - short puppet film after Josef Skupa (1954)
- Creation of the World - full-length cartoon after Jean Effel (1957)
- Limonádový Joe aneb Koňská opera - full-length film (dir. Oldřich Lipský, 1963)

Literary works

- Superstitions and Problems of Jazz, SNKLHU 1959
- Brass Instruments without Machinery, SNKLHU 1960
- Elements of New Compositional Techniques in Music of the Past, in Exotic and Folk Music, SHV 1964 (in: miscellany 'The New Ways of Music')
- Modern Instrumentation (finished by Jarmil Burghauser and coll.), Panton 1968
