= Lišov =

- Town
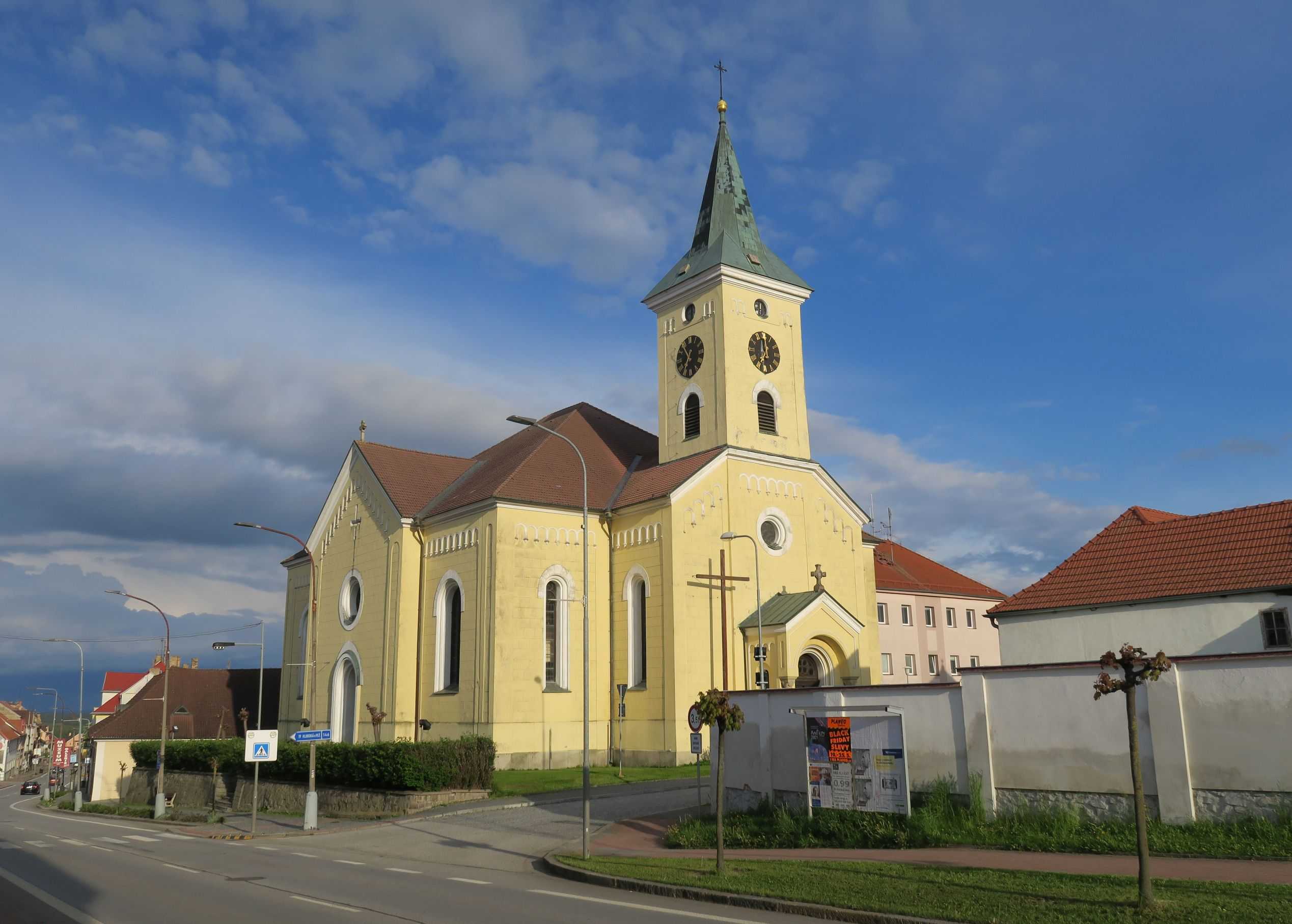
- Church of Saint Wenceslaus

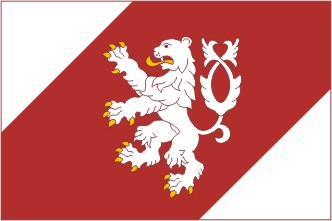
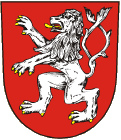
- Flag Coat of arms

- Location in the Czech Republic
- Coordinates: 49°0′58″N 14°36′30″E
- Country: Czech Republic
- Region: South Bohemian
- District: České Budějovice
- First mentioned: 1296

Government
  - Mayor: Jiří Švec

Area
  - Total: 93.55 km^{2} (36.12 sq mi)
- Elevation: 505 m (1,657 ft)

Population (2026-01-01)
  - Total: 4,670
  - Density: 49.9/km^{2} (129/sq mi)
- Time zone: UTC+1 (CET)
  - Summer (DST): UTC+2 (CEST)
- Postal code: 373 72
- Website: www.lisov.cz

Lišov (Czech pronunciation: [ˈlɪʃof]; German: Lischau) is a town in České Budějovice District in the South Bohemian Region of the Czech Republic. It has about 4,700 inhabitants. The town is located in the Třeboň Basin, in an area rich in fishponds. The most important monument in Lišov is the Schwarzenberg Hospital.

== Administrative division ==
Lišov consists of 13 municipal parts (in brackets population according to the 2021 census):

- Lišov (3,320)
- Červený Újezdec (49)
- Dolní Miletín (78)
- Dolní Slověnice (105)
- Horní Miletín (88)
- Horní Slověnice (125)
- Hrutov (37)
- Hůrky (262)
- Kolný (49)
- Levín (42)
- Lhotice (129)
- Velechvín (93)
- Vlkovice (136)

Vlkovice forms an exclave of the municipal territory.

== Etymology ==
The name Lišov was probably derived from the personal name Lichý, meaning "Lichý's (settlement)".

== Geography ==
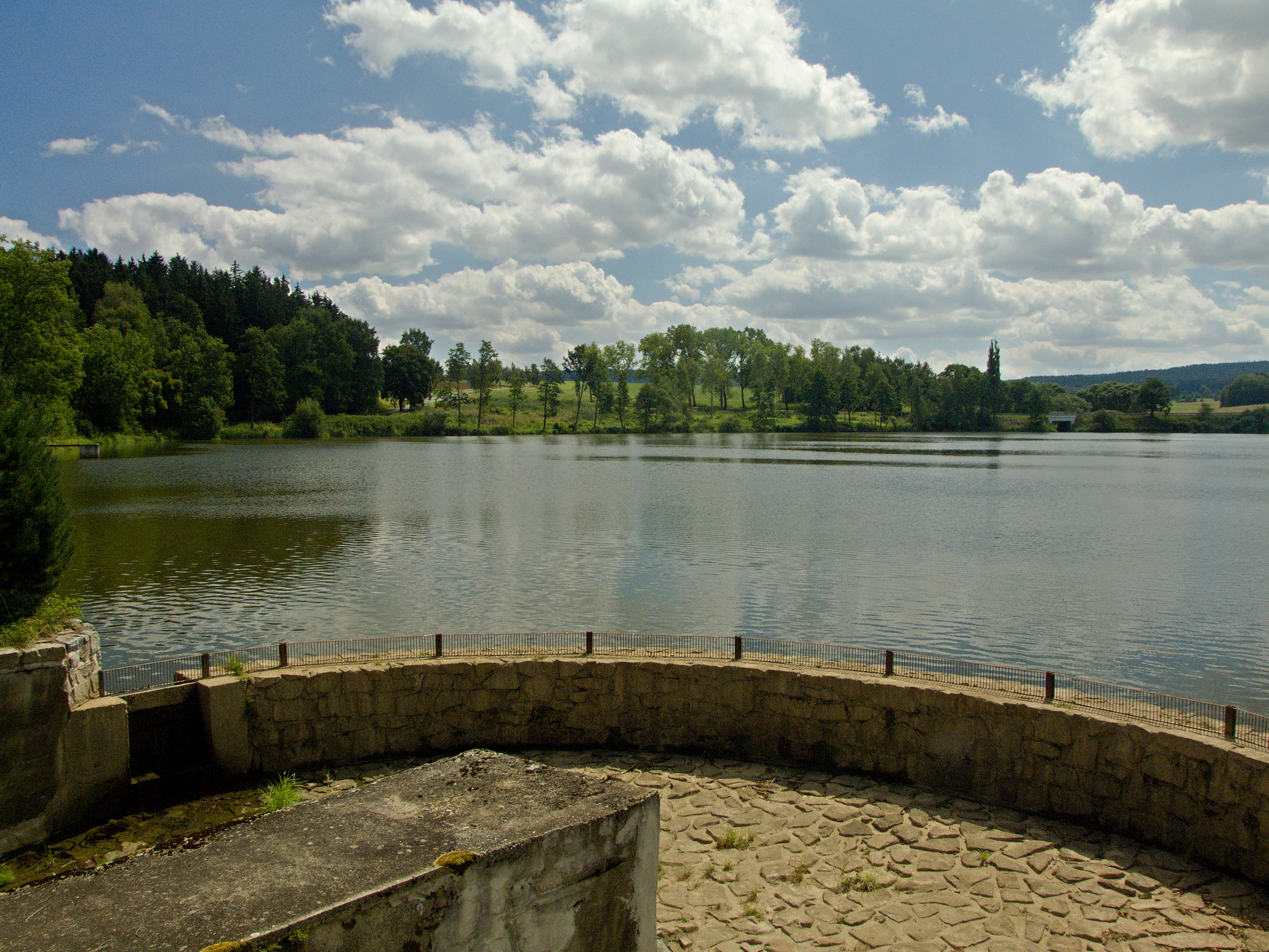
Dvořiště fishpond

Lišov is located about 9 kilometres (6 mi) northeast of České Budějovice. It lies in the Třeboň Basin. The stream Lišovský potok originates here and then flows through the town. In addition to several smaller fishponds, there is the fishpond Dvořiště in the northeastern part of the territory, which is one of the largest ponds in the Czech Republic.

== History ==
The first written mention of Lišov is from 1296. In 1400, it was first referred to as a market town.

== Demographics ==
Historical population

Year	Pop.	±%
1869	4,904	—
1880	5,152	+5.1%
1890	4,760	−7.6%
1900	4,693	−1.4%
1910	4,891	+4.2%

Year	Pop.	±%
1921	4,779	−2.3%
1930	4,594	−3.9%
1950	4,048	−11.9%
1961	4,101	+1.3%
1970	3,642	−11.2%

Year	Pop.	±%
1980	3,661	+0.5%
1991	3,806	+4.0%
2001	3,918	+2.9%
2011	4,113	+5.0%
2021	4,513	+9.7%

Source: Censuses

== Transport ==
The D3 motorway (the section from České Budějovice to Tábor, part of the European route E55) runs along the western municipal border. The I/34 (the section from České Budějovice to Jindřichův Hradec, part of the European route E551 and shortly also part of the European route E49) runs through the town.

== Sights ==
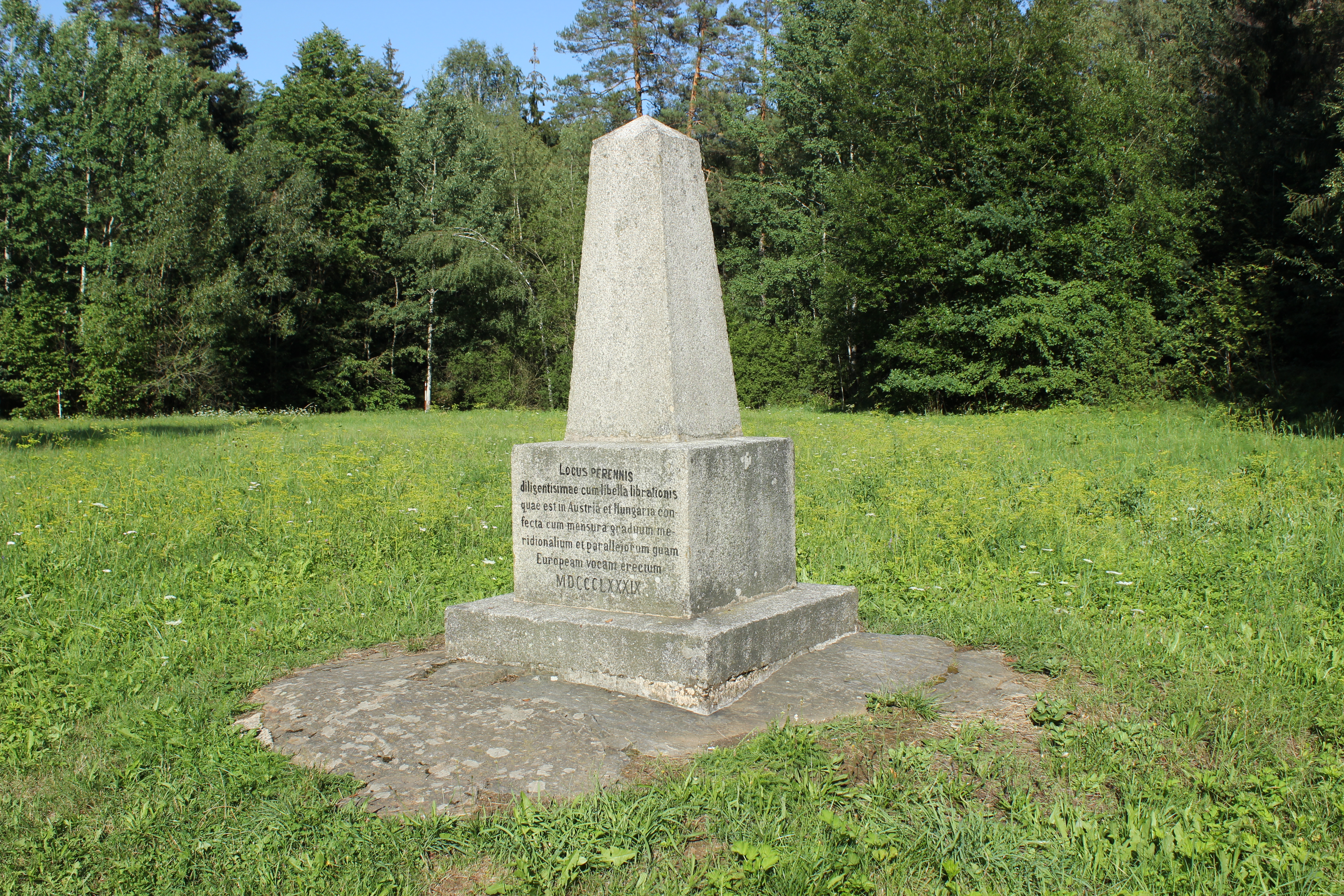
Locus perennis

The most valuable building is the Schwarzenberg Hospital, built by Jan Adolf of Schwarzenberg in 1675–1676. Today it houses a museum, a library and an art gallery.

The Church of Saint Wenceslaus was built in the second half of the 19th century. It replaced the old church. The Church of Saints Nicholas and Leonard in Dolní Slověnice is originally a Gothic church from the late 13th century. It was later rebuilt in the Baroque style.

A technical monument is Locus perennis or "eternal place", an obelisk with built-in levelling markings. It was established here as one of the seven fixed points of accurate levelling of the Austro-Hungarian surveying system for European measurements. According to this system, the altitude of the obelisk is exactly 565.1483 metres (1,854.161 ft) above sea level in Trieste.

== Notable people ==
- Milan Sachs (1884–1968), Czech-Croatian opera conductor and composer
- Milan Křížek (1926–2018), composer, music teacher and violinist

== Twin towns – sister cities ==
Lišov is twinned with:

- Schüpfen, Switzerland
- Varmo, Italy
