= Figurentheater Wilde & Vogel =

German Puppet Company

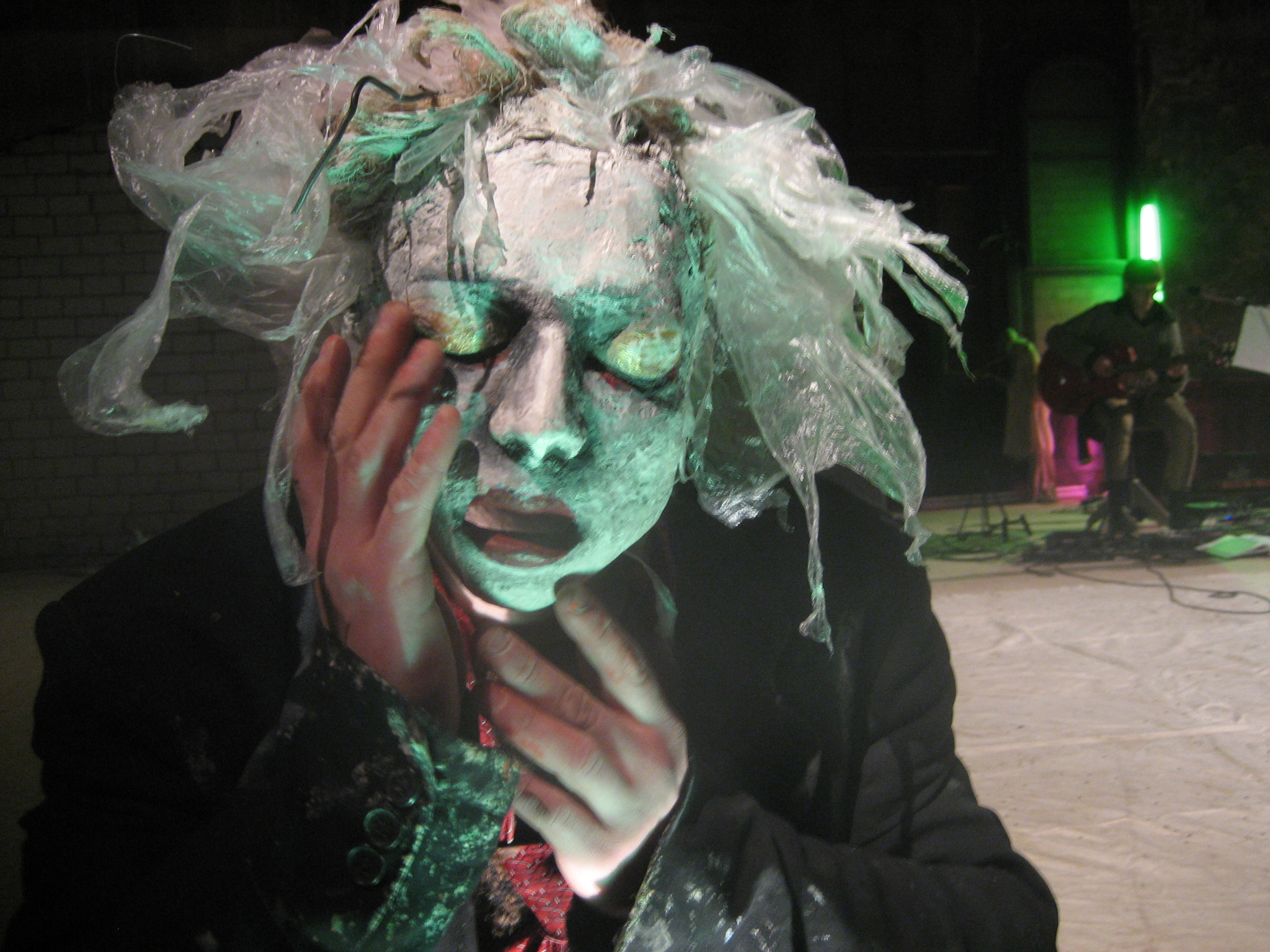
„Spleen. Charles Baudelaire: Poems in Prose“, foto/directed by Hendrik Mannes, 2006

Figurentheater Wilde & Vogel is a German freelance, touring puppet theatre company established in Stuttgart in 1997. In 2009 the company moved to Leipzig.

In 2003 Wilde & Vogel also co-founded the Lindenfels Westflügel Leipzig, where they organize events and work as artistic directors.

== Troupe ==
Charlotte Wilde studied Music, English and History in Karlsruhe. She improvises, composes and plays music live for the productions of Wilde & Vogel and other theatres on violin, guitar and keys. She is also responsible for the management and production.

Michael Vogel studied puppetry in Prague at the Spejbl and Hurvínek Theatre and then at the State University of Music and Performing Arts Stuttgart, where he also taught from 1998 to 2006. In 1999 Michael held a scholarship from the Baden-Württemberg Art Foundation.

== Awards ==
The company has received 20 awards for its productions, amongst others at the International Solo Puppeteer's Festival in Łódź, Poland in 1998; at the International Puppet Festival of Adult Puppet Theatre in 2001 in Pécs, Hungary; at the XX. International Festival Bielsko-Biała, Poland in 2002 and 2008; at the 5. International Festival "Spectaculo Interesse" in 2003 in Ostrava, Czech Republic; the Theaterpreis der Stuttgarter Zeitung in 2007; the George Tabori Award 2013 Fonds Darstellende Künste; and the award at the International Theatre Festival in 2013 in Puebla, Mexico.

== Productions ==
=== Own productions ===
- Galerie Fred, Songs Joachim Will, Direction: Anja Göpfert, 1991
- The Trip to Panama, Janosch, Songs Joachim Will, Direction Ensemble, 1994
- Exit. A Hamlet fantasy, Direction: Frank Soehnle, 1997
- Nils Holgersson with Claudia Olma, Direction: Christiane Zanger, 1998
- Toccata. A nightpiece about Robert Schumann, Direction, Frank Soehnle, 2000
- Orpheus Underground, with Johannes Frisch, Miriam Goldschmidt, Wolfgang Kroke, Fine Kwiatkowski, Claudia Olma, Jason Träder, Bénédicte Trouvé, Direction: Hendrik Mannes, 2001
- Maria on the High Wire, Based on the novel by Lygia Bojunga, with Ines Müller-Braunschweig, Direction: Christiane Zanger, 2002
- King Lear – Work in Progress with Johannes Frisch, Miriam Goldschmidt, Regie-Mitarbeit Claudia Olma, Michael Meschke, Hendrik Mannes, 2003–2006
- The Hobbit, J. R. R. Tolkien with Florian Feisel, Direction: Christiane Zanger, 2004
- Sommernachtstraum – reorganisiert with Christoph Bochdansky (A), Direction: Astrid Griesbach, 2004
- until doomsday with Kompania Doomsday (PL), Akademia Teatralna Warszawa / Department of Puppetry Art Bialystok, Direction: Michael Vogel, 2004
- Salomé with Kompania Doomsday (PL), Direction: Michael Vogel, 2005
- Spleen. Charles Baudelaire Poems in prose, Direction: Hendrik Mannes, 2006
- Lear, Willam Shakespeare with Johannes Frisch, Frank Schneider, Direction: Hendrik Mannes, 2007
- Mewa mit Kompania Doomsday (PL), Direction: Hendrik Mannes, 2008
- Faust spielen with Christoph Bochdansky (A), Direction: Christiane Zanger, 2008
- Krabat, Otfried Preußler with Pawel Chomczyk, Florian Feisel, Dagmara Sowa, Direction: Christiane Zanger, 2010
- Songs for Alice, Lewis Carroll, with Johannes Frisch, Direction: Hendrik Mannes, 2011
- Głośniej! / Louder! with Teatr Hotel Malabar, Warszawa, Direction: Michael Vogel, Music: Charlotte Wilde, 2012
- Makariens Archiv with AKHE Theatre/театр АХE/St. Petersburg, Direction: Pawel Semtschenko, with Stefan Wenzel, Alisa Olejnik, Puppets: Michael Vogel, 2013
- Panopticon / Паноптикон with Gulliver Puppet Theatre Kurgan / Театр кукол "Гулливер" (R), 2014
- REM with Białostocki Teatr Lalek, Lehmann+Wenzel, Grupa Coincidentia, Direction: Michael Vogel, 2014
- Sibirien, Direction: Christiane Zanger, 2015
- Session: Short Cuts. Kleist – Unwahrscheinliche Wahrhaftigkeiten with Miriam Goldschmidt, Direction: Mannes, Dramaturgy: Antonia Christel 2015
- Die Empfindsamkeit der Giganten with Christoph Bochdansky, Direction: Gyula Molnár, 2016
- Session: Songs from the Graveyard with Frank Schneider, Johannes Frisch, Konrad Schreiter, Fiona Ebner, 2016
- Session: Short Cuts. "Die Familie Schroffenstein" H. v. Kleist with Anne Tismer, Direction: Mannes, Dramaturgy: Christel 2016
- Session: Short Cuts. "Penthesilea" H. v. Kleist mit Marina Tenório, Direction: Mannes, Dramaturgy: Christel, 2017
- Frankenstein or the Modern Prometheus, Mary Shelley, Direction: Hendrik Mannes, Dramaturgy: Antonia Christel, with Winnie Luzie Burz, Jan Jedenak, Stefan Wenzel, Johannes Frisch, Ilka Schönbein, 2017
- Session: Kukułka 1 & 2 Leipzig and Solniki44 with Lehmann+Wenzel, Grupa Coincidentia, Stefanie Oberhoff, 2017
- N₂0₂Ar with Lehmann+Wenzel, 2017
- Try to sit on the air, Lehmann+Wenzel, Members of the Leipzig Gewandhaus Choir, choir director: Gregor Meyer, Direction: Franziska Merkel, 2018
- Dust – אבק with Golden Delicious [ISR/CH], Ari Teperberg, Inbal Yomtovian, Dramaturgy: Jonas Klinkenberg, Direction: Antonia Christl, Hendrik Mannes, 2018
- KUKUŁKA - A Fictional Documentary Grupa Coincidentia [Białystok/Polen], Lehmann+Wenzel, Direction : Łukasz Kos, Dramaturgy: Fiona Ebner, 2019
- Der Reigen, Choreographie: Rose Breuss, Christoph Bochdansky, Kai Chun Chuang, Damian Cortes Alberti, Marcela Lopez Morales, Music: Protect Laika, 2020
- The Flowers of Evil, Charles Baudelaire, Direction Hendrik Mannes, Dramaturgy, co-direction Antonia Christl, 2021
- Micro, Artistic consultant Joachim Fleischer, Musical consultant Johannes Frisch, 2021
- I am not in a Room, Emily Dickinson, mit Kai Chun Chuang, Choreographia[Inter]Austriaca, Choreografie: Rose Breuss, 2022
- overALL underALL, with Philipp Scholz, Text: Susa Schmeel, Directed by: Christiane Zanger, 2023
- Animal Farm, A Musical in 10 chapters based on George Orwell, by and with: Florian Feisel, Alexandra Gosławska, Mechtild Nienaber, Samira Wenzel, Stefan Wenzel, Johannes Frisch, Aline Patschke, Philipp Scholz, Charlotte Wilde, Michael Vogel, Janne Weirup, 2025

=== Productions in collaboration (character creation and performance, music, direction) (selection) ===
- Lug und Trug – Drei Groschen und kein bißchen Oper Hochschule für Musik und Darstellende Kunst Stuttgart, Direction: Frank Soehnle, 1995
- Die große Wut des Philipp Hotz, Max Frisch, Theater Waidspeicher Erfurt, Hochschule für Musik und Darstellende Kunst Stuttgart, Direction: Andreas Günther, 1996
- Turandot, Giacomo Puccini, Staatsoper Stuttgart, Direction Nicolas Brieger, 1997
- Bossa Nova, Theater Paradox Stuttgart, Stuttgarter Zeitung Theater Award 1998, Direction: Frank Soehnle, 1997
- The Tempest, William Shakeseare, bat-Studiotheater Berlin, Puppets: Michael Vogel, Direction: Markus Joss, 2000
- Das Fest des Lamms, Badisches Staatstheater Karlsruhe, Direction: Donald Berkenhoff, 2002
- Beauty and the Beast, Puppentheater der Stadt Halle, Puppets: Michael Vogel, Direction: Ralf Meyer, 2002
- The Little Prince, Antoine de Saint-Exupéry, Landesbühne Esslingen, Music: Charlotte Wilde, Direction: Hubert Habig, 2002
- Leonard, Theater der Jungen Welt Leipzig, Direction Ines Müller-Braunschweig, 2003
- Konen i Muddergroeften, Nørregaards Teater Ebeltoft (DK), Direct:ion Michael Vogel, 2004
- until doomsday – Die Ballade vom Fliegenden Holländer Akademia Teatralna Warschau/Bialystok (PL), Direction: Vogel, 2004
- King Kong, Marotte Figurentheater Karlsruhe, Puppets: Michael Vogel, Direction: Friederike Krahl, 2006
- Bruckner – Genie der Töne von Jürgen Czwienk, ZDF/3sat, Schleswig-Holstein-Musikfestival, 2007
- Die vier Lichter des Hirten Simon, Music: Charlotte Wilde, Regie Angelika Jedelhauser, Zikade Theater, FITZ Stuttgart 2009
- Der Freischütz with Stefan Wenzel & Samira Lehmann, HMDK Stuttgart, Direction: Michael Vogel (Leipziger Bewegungskunstpreis), 2013
- Zaches, E. T. A. Hoffmann with Stefan Wenzel & Samira Lehmann, Studiengang Figurentheater HMDK Stuttgart, Direction: Michael Vogel, 2015
- Grassi invites #3: Masken! Shebassa Maske 1 von 2, Grassimuseum für Völkerkunde Leipzig, M.Vogel, B.Vogel, J.Weirup, 2016
- Ich freue mich von Christoph Bochdansky, Martin Ptak, Direction: Michael Vogel, 2017
- Little Shop Of Horrors, Białystok Puppet Theatre, Dramaturgy: Janne Weirup, Direction: Michael Vogel, 2018
- Die rote Zora, Lehmann und Wenzel + flunker produktionen, 2022
- Sesam / ತಿಲ, with Ranga Shankara Bengaluru / India and Westflügel Leipzig, 2023
- Superheroes, co-operation with Grupa Coincidentia (PL), 2024
