= Josef Skupa =

Czech puppeteer (1892–1957)

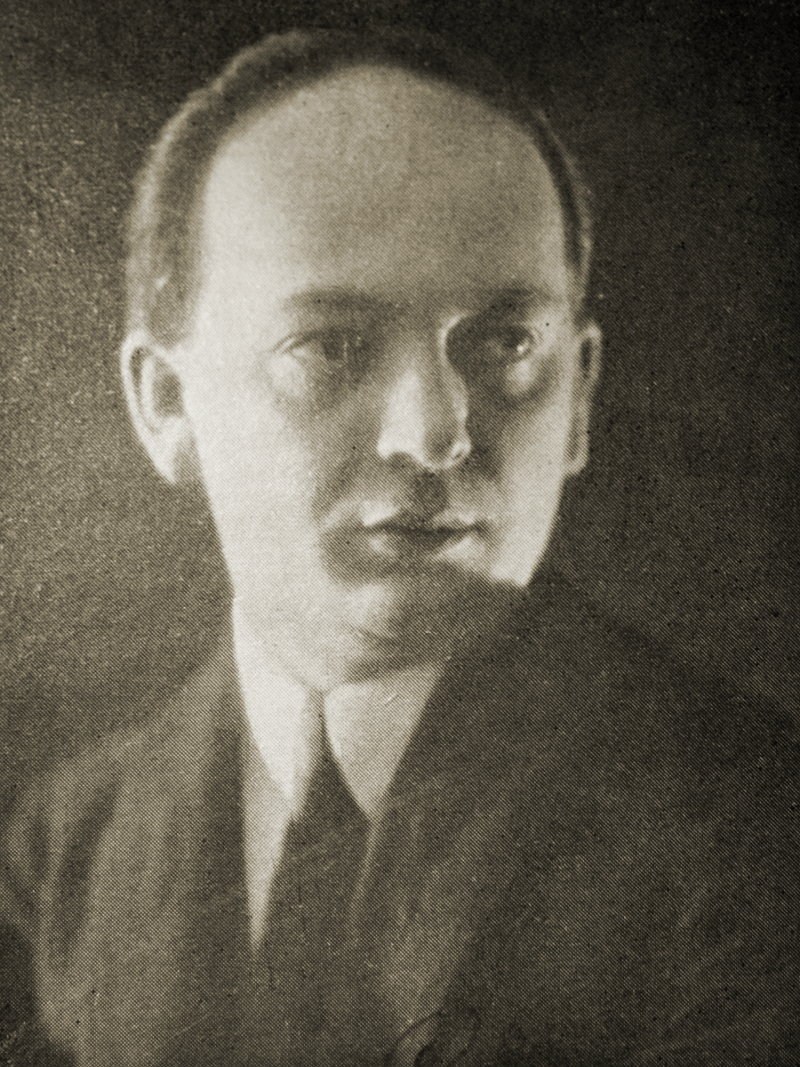
- Skupa in 1928
- Born: 16 January 1892; Strakonice, Bohemia, Austria-Hungary
- Died: 8 January 1957 (aged 64); Prague, Czechoslovakia
- Resting place: Central Cemetery, Plzeň
- Education: Academy of Arts, Architecture and Design in Prague
- Occupation: Puppeteer

Josef Skupa (16 January 1892 – 8 January 1957) was a Czech puppeteer. He also worked in the field of puppet theatre as a playwright, director and stage designer. He developed the most famous Czech puppets, Spejbl and Hurvínek, and founded the first Czech professional puppet theatre, the Spejbl and Hurvínek Theatre. From 1933 to 1957, he was the president of the International Puppetry Association—UNIMA.

== Early life and education ==
Josef Alois Skupa was born on 16 January 1892 in Strakonice, into a family of a gendarme. His family also lived in Blovice and Chanovice, before moving to Plzeň, when Josef was five years old. He attended the primary school (Volksschule) in Mladějovice. In 1903–1906, he attended a high school in Plzeň. In 1911–1915, he studied at the Academy of Arts, Architecture and Design in Prague. After he graduated, he returned to Plzeň and worked as a high school teacher of mathematics and drawing. He also collaborated with the Plzeň City Theatre as a stage designer.

== Early theatre career ==
Skupa performed his first puppet shows in Mladějovice as a child, when he was visiting his uncle. During his student years, he attended cabarets in Prague and performed in satirical cabaret improvisations himself. He wrote texts for Ferenc Futurista (then a sculpture student) and they modeled puppets for their joint performances. From 1917, he collaborated with the amateur puppet theatre of Feriální osady (charitable association). He gradually worked there as a stage designer, dramaturg, director and puppeteer. He most often performed with the traditional puppet of kašpárek (Kasperle). He quickly became a leading figure in the theatre.

== Spejbl and Hurvínek and later life ==
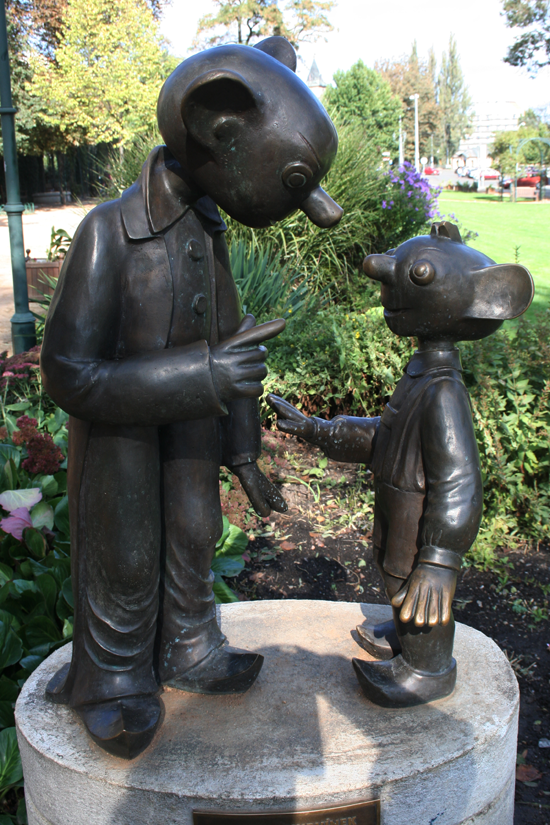
Spejbl and Hurvínek monument in Plzeň

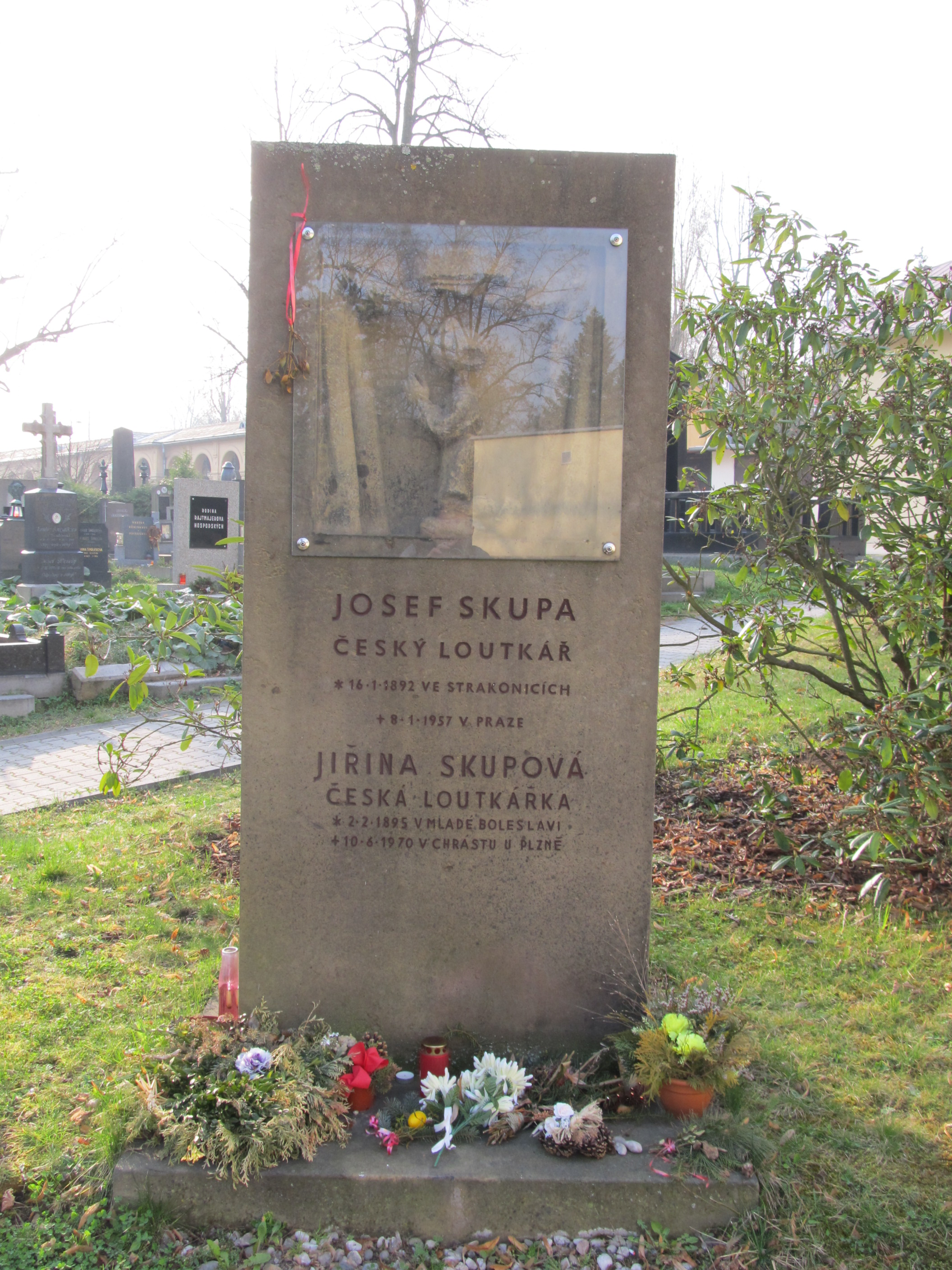
Grave of Josef Skupa in Plzeň

In 1919, he designed the puppet of Spejbl, a big-eared bald figure who was supposed to become a caricature of outsmarted townspeople. The puppet first appeared in a performance in 1920, performing with kašpárek as the victim of his pranks. From 1923 to 1926, Skupa performed with the puppet of Švejk. In 1926, he returned to Spejbl and designed the puppet of his rascal son Hurvínek. Spejbl and Hurvínek became the most popular and longest-serving puppets in the history of Czech puppetry.

In 1920, Josef Skupa married Jiřina Schwarzová. They did not have children. Jiřina Skupová supported her husband in his activities and became a stage designer, playwriter and puppeteer, in charge of Hurvínek.

In 1930, Skupa left the teaching profession. The theatre, now known as the Plzeň Puppet Theatre of Professor Skupa (Czech: Plzeňské loutkové divadlo profesora Skupy), went from amateur to professional that year, becoming the first professional puppet theatre in the country. The theatre troupe hired additional staff, including Frank Wenig, who co-wrote plays with Skupa. Most of the plays did not have a well-developed story, but even in unsuccessful plays, Skupa's acting skills and ability to improvise saved the performance. In 1933, Skupa became the president of the UNIMA (International Puppetry Association), and held the position until his death.

After 1933, the theatre had to fear censorship. In 1938, Skupa and Wenig wrote one of the theatre's most memorable plays, Kolotoč o třech poschodích (The Three-Story Carousel), which was a bold allegory of the Munich Agreement. In 1944–1945, Skupa was imprisoned by the Gestapo in Dresden. After World War II, he began working for a radio in Plzeň, but then, thanks to his friends, he resumed his theatre and reopened it in Prague under the name Spejbl and Hurvínek Theatre. Skupa also became the head of the puppetry theatre department at the Academy of Performing Arts in Prague.

From 1948, the theatre performed not only in Czechoslovakia, but also abroad (in the United Kingdom, Poland, France, Hungary, Romania, Sweden and the Soviet Union), thanks to the new actor Miloš Kirschner, who knew foreign languages. However, during this period until his death, Skupa struggled with a creative crisis and only performed plays from the pre-war period. In 1956, Skupa handed over the theatre to Kirschner. He died on 8 January 1957 in Prague. He is buried at the Central Cemetery in Plzeň.

Skupa was an active freemason of masonic lodge Josef Dobrovský in Plzeň.

== Honours ==
In 1948, he was awarded by the Czechoslovak State with the title of National Artist.

Every two years, an international festival of professional puppet and alternative theatre takes place in Plzeň and is called Skupa's Plzeň. It was first held in 1967 and was held annually until 1978.

In 1967, Skupa was posthumously awarded Honorary Citizenship of Plzeň. A street in Plzeň is named Skupova after Josef Skupa.
