= Harvie and the Magic Museum =

2017 Czech animated fantasy film

- Czech theatrical release poster
- Directed by: Martin Kotík, Inna Evlannikova
- Written by: Jesper Møller; Petr Nepovim; Miki Kirschner; Dan Harder
- Produced by: Sergey Zernov; Vadim Sotskov; Martin Kotik
- Edited by: Karel Coma; Martin Kotík
- Music by: Jiří Škorpík
- Production companies: Rolling Pictures; Grid Animation; KinoAtis
- Distributed by: CinemArt (Czech Republic); MVK (Russia)
- Release dates: 31 August 2017 (Czech Republic); 7 March 2019 (Russia)
- Running time: 87 minutes
- Countries: Czech Republic; Russia; Belgium
- Language: Czech
- Budget: 170,000,000 CZK ($8,000,000)
- Box office: $2.1 million

Harvie and the Magic Museum (Czech: Hurvínek a kouzelné muzeum, Russian: Гурвинек: Волшебная игра, lit. 'Gurvinek: The Magic Game') is a 2017 3D animated comedy fantasy film based on the Czech Spejbl and Hurvínek puppet comedy duo.

== Plot ==
Harvie Spejbl is a young boy who lives with his father, Joseph, and lives with his neighbor, Monica. One day, while witnessing a legendary puppet museum being demolished under the orders of the towns mayor, Harvie's attempt to sabotage the demolition culminates in a massive hole forming that drops him and Monica into a cave filled with puppets. There, they discover a magic disk and use it to open an entrance to the puppet museum, where they enter. They meet Brainy, Grumpy, and Dimwit, who explain that puppet master Bastor's heart was consumed with disk after transforming himself into a wooden puppet years ago, and the trio imprisoned him ever since.

Before Harvie can place the disk in a pedestal located up high in the museum, Joseph arrives, and Harvie tries to convince Joseph about the disk to no avail, which leads to Joseph to lose faith in Harvie. He successfully places the disk into the pedestal, and the group enter a secret room filled with puppet masters, where Harvie is recognized as a puppet master.

Harvie pushes a button located underneath the disk ignoring the puppet's warning about it, inadvertently releasing Bastor, who takes the disk for his goal of transforming every object in the town and its inhabitants into puppet versions of theirselves, while Harvie and Monica flee into a lab. He tearfully confesses his mistakes to her. The two escape the lab by an elevator, and Harvie tries to grab the disk, but Bastor knocks him off the museum, being rescued by Joseph.

Realizing that the disk is where Bastor's heart is located at, Harvie defeats Bastor by placing the disk onto its respective place, causing Bastor to fade, and restoring the entire world. Harvie then apologies to Joseph about the mess. The following day, the museum is reopened as a magic puppet museum in honor of the Spejbl's.

== Cast ==
Character	Czech	English
Harvie Spejbl	Martin Klásek	Cecelia Davis
Joseph Spejbl	Martin Klásek	Mike Pollock
Grumpy	Ota Jirák	Brian Anthony Wilson
Monica	Helena Štáchová	Sarah Natochenny
Katarina Hovorková	Helena Štáchová	Grace Gonglewski
Brainy	Vilém Udatný	Marc Thompson
Bastor	Jan Vondráček	Tyler Bunch
The Devils	Martin Dejdar and Jiří Lábus	Abe Goldfarb
Mr. Mayor	Libor Terš	Scott Greer
Dimwit	Vilém Udatný	Billy Bob Thompson
Mrs. Titmouse	?	Sondra James
Mrs. Siskin	?	Billy Bob Thompson
Construction Workers	?	Tyler Bunch
Teacher	?	Abe Goldfarb

== Production ==
Production for the film lasted seven years. With a budget of 170,000,000 CZK ($8,000,000), it was the fifth most expensive Czech film at the time of its release, and the most expensive animated Czech film.

== Release and reception ==
The film was released in the Czech Republic and Slovakia on 31 August 2017, and had a worldwide gross of $2,079,037. In the Czech Republic, it opened with $354,048 for a total gross of $1,007,954; in Slovakia, it opened with $2,265 for a total of $61,859. The film was released in Russia on 7 March 2019. It was boycotted by the Association of Cinema Owners and three other networks due to the lobbying of the film by the Ministry of Culture of the Russian Federation. Because of this, the film was a box office bomb, grossing $235,105 in its opening weekend for a total gross of $468,680.

The film received generally negative reviews from critics.

The UK and Irish DVD release markets the film as a Halloween movie.

== See also ==
- List of animated feature films of 2017
- List of most expensive Czech films
