= List of most expensive Czech films =

This is a list of the most expensive Czech films, with budgets given in Czech korunas.

== Most expensive Czech films ==
Rank	Title	Year	Budget	Status	Source
1	Medieval	2022	500,000,000 CZK	Released	
2	Bathory	2008	328,000,000 CZK	Released	
3	The Last Children of Aporver	N/A	240,000,000 CZK	Unfinished	
4	Dark Blue World	2002	230,000,000 CZK	Released	
5	Anthropoid	2016	220,000,000 CZK	Released	
6	Harvie and the Magic Museum	2017	170,000,000 CZK	Released	
6	The Manor	1999	170,000,000 CZK	Released	
8	The Painted Bird	2019	159,000,000 CZK	Released	
9	Maria Theresia	2017	130,000,000 CZK	Released	
10	Il Boemo	2022	128,500,000 CZK	Released	
11	Zlatý podraz	2018	100,000,000 CZK	Released	

== Record-holders ==
Timeline of the most expensive Czech films
Year	Film	Budget	Source
1930	St. Wenceslas	4,500,000 KČs	
1950	Temno	5,330,000 KČs	
1951	The Emperor and the Golem	7,220,000 KČs	
1954	Jan Hus	13,110,000 KČs	
1955	Jan Žižka	22,000,000 KČs	
1956	Against All	25,000,000 KČs	
1974	Sokolovo	28,000,000 Kčs	
1994	Accumulator 1	35,000,000 CZK	
1999	The Manor	170,000,000 CZK	
2002	Dark Blue World	230,000,000 CZK	
2008	Bathory	328,000,000 CZK	
2022	Jan Žižka	500,000,000 CZK	

== See also ==
- List of most expensive films
- List of most expensive non-English-language films
- List of highest-grossing films
- List of highest-grossing Czech films
