= Helena Štáchová =

Czech actress and puppeteer (1944–2017)

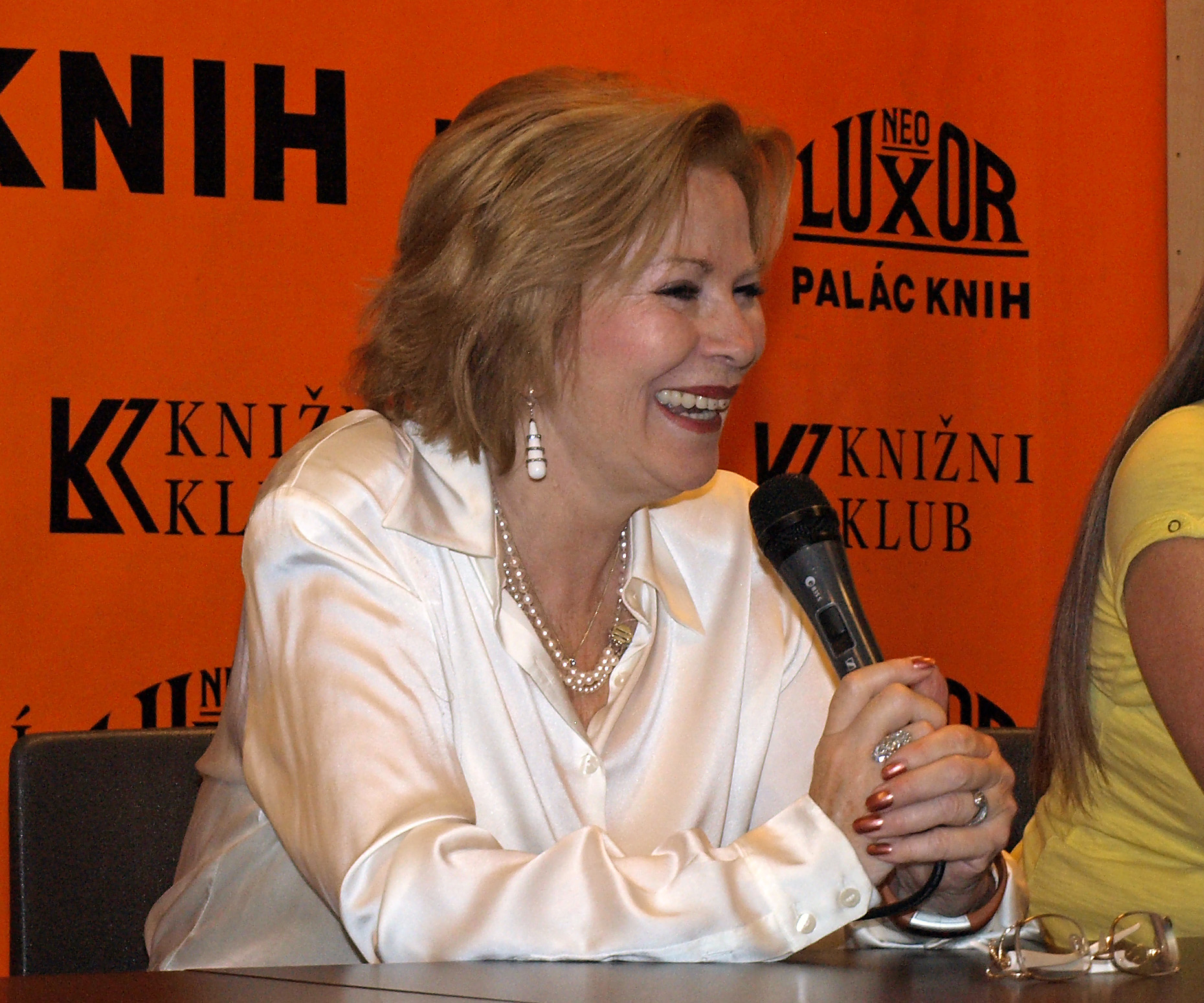
Helena Štáchová in 2011

Helena Štáchová (18 November 1944 – 22 March 2017) was a Czech puppeteer, voice actress and playwright. Štáchová served as the head and director of the Spejbl and Hurvínek Theatre (S+H), which opened in 1930 as former Czechoslovakia's first professional puppet theatre, from 1996 until she died in 2017. She also provided the voice of popular puppets, Mrs. Kateřina and her granddaughter Mánička, who are the female characters in the Spejbl and Hurvínek puppet shows.

In addition, Štáchová worked as a voice actress as well. Notably, Štáchová provided the Czech language-voice of Lisa Simpson on the Czech version of the American animated sitcom, The Simpsons.

== Biography ==
Štáchová was born in Prague on 18 November 1944. She began performing at the Spejbl and Hurvínek Theatre after completing secondary school. She graduated from the Theatre Faculty of the Academy of Performing Arts in Prague (DAMU) and became a full member of the S+H theatre company in 1966. She began performing the lead role of the puppet girl, Mánička, in 1967. Mánička, who quickly became a popular character, was a friend of the established father-son puppets, Spejbl and Hurvínek.

Štáchová married Miloš Kirschner, S+H puppeteer and theatre director. In 1971, Kirschner created a new grandmother puppet, Mrs. Kateřina, specifically for Štáchová, which added another female character to the ensemble. Since their creation, Štáchová's Mánička and Mrs. Kateřina have become very popular in the Czech Republic. Štáchová also toured with the puppet theatre internationally and performed her puppets in several foreign languages.

Štáchová became the head of the Spejbl and Hurvínek Theatre in 1996, following the death of her husband that same year. She led the theatre until her death in March 2017. In addition to her puppetry and voice acting on television shows, such as The Simpsons, Štáchová also authored several books and directed and wrote her own plays.

In 2008, a Czech court awarded Štáchová the rights to utilize the Spejbl and Hurvínek characters after an eight-year legal dispute, which allowed her Spejbl and Hurvínek Theatre to continue its programs.

In 2016, actress Marie Šimsová began performing in the role of the puppet, Mánička, due to Štáchová's declining health. Following a long illness, Štáchová died at her home in Prague on 22 March 2017, at the age of 72.
