= Chanovice =

- Municipality
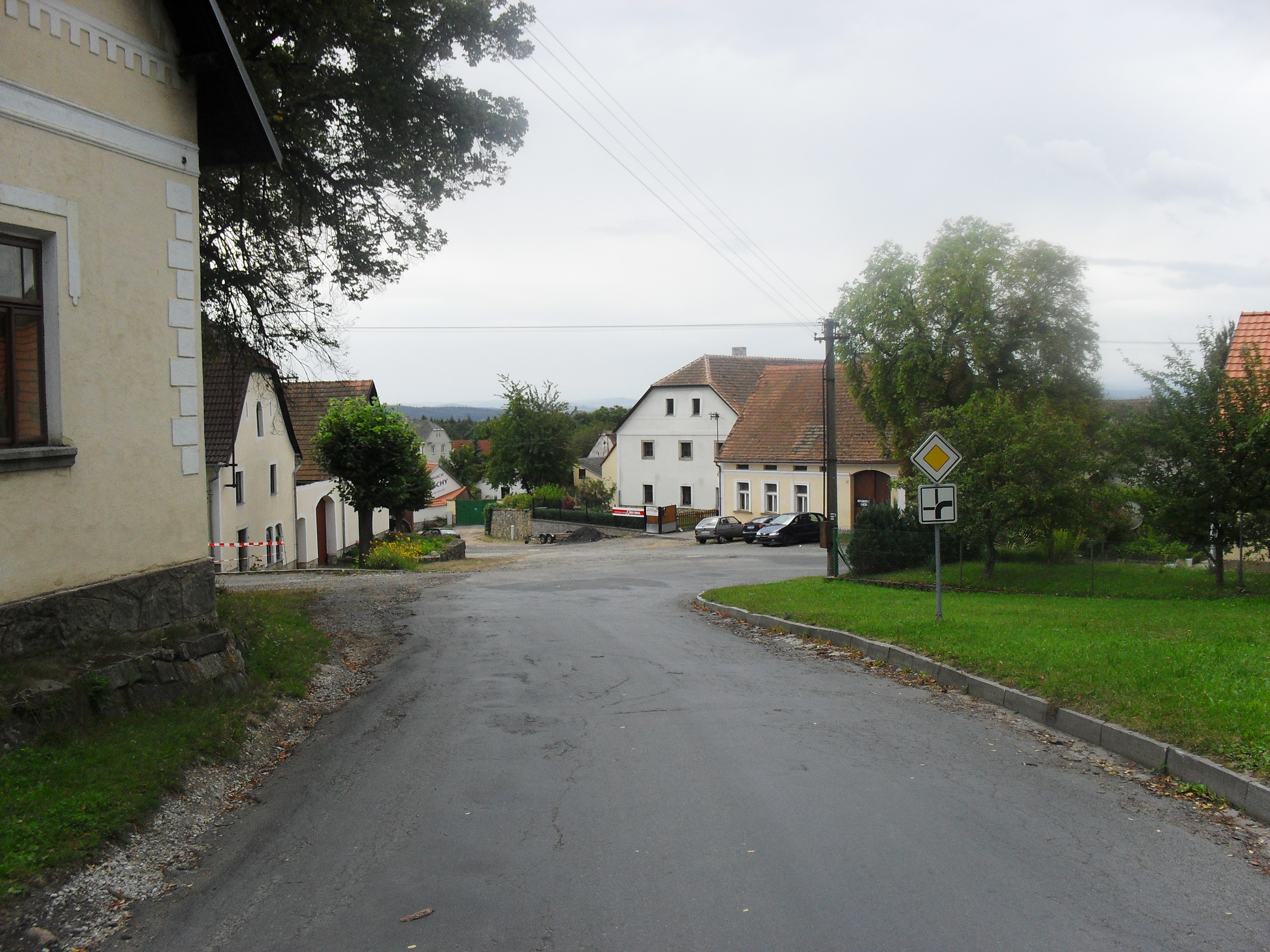
- Centre of Chanovice

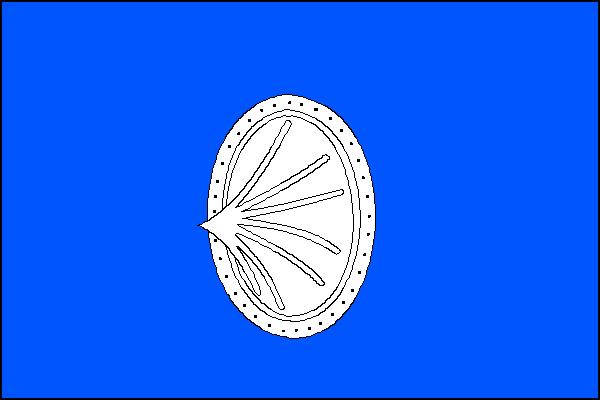
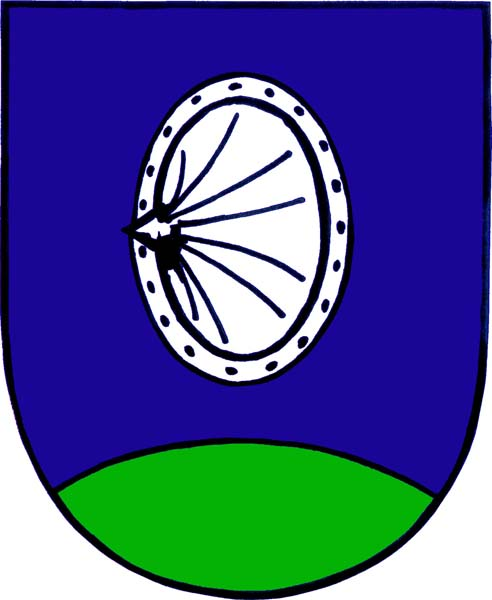
- Flag Coat of arms

- Location in the Czech Republic
- Coordinates: 49°24′18″N 13°43′3″E
- Country: Czech Republic
- Region: Plzeň
- District: Klatovy
- First mentioned: 1352

Area
  - Total: 19.68 km^{2} (7.60 sq mi)
- Elevation: 548 m (1,798 ft)

Population (2026-01-01)
  - Total: 788
  - Density: 40.0/km^{2} (104/sq mi)
- Time zone: UTC+1 (CET)
  - Summer (DST): UTC+2 (CEST)
- Postal code: 341 01
- Website: www.chanovice.cz

Chanovice is a municipality and village in Klatovy District in the Plzeň Region of the Czech Republic. It has about 800 inhabitants.

== Administrative division ==
Chanovice consists of six municipal parts (in brackets population according to the 2021 census):

- Chanovice (396)
- Černice (26)
- Defurovy Lažany (64)
- Dobrotice (61)
- Holkovice (116)
- Újezd u Chanovic (68)

== Etymology ==
The name is derived from the personal name Chán, meaning "the village of Chán's people".

== Geography ==
Chanovice is located about 30 kilometres (19 mi) east of Klatovy and 43 km (27 mi) southeast of Plzeň. It lies in the Blatná Uplands. The highest point is the hill Ostrý vrch at 612 m (2,008 ft) above sea level. The municipal territory is rich in fishponds.

== History ==
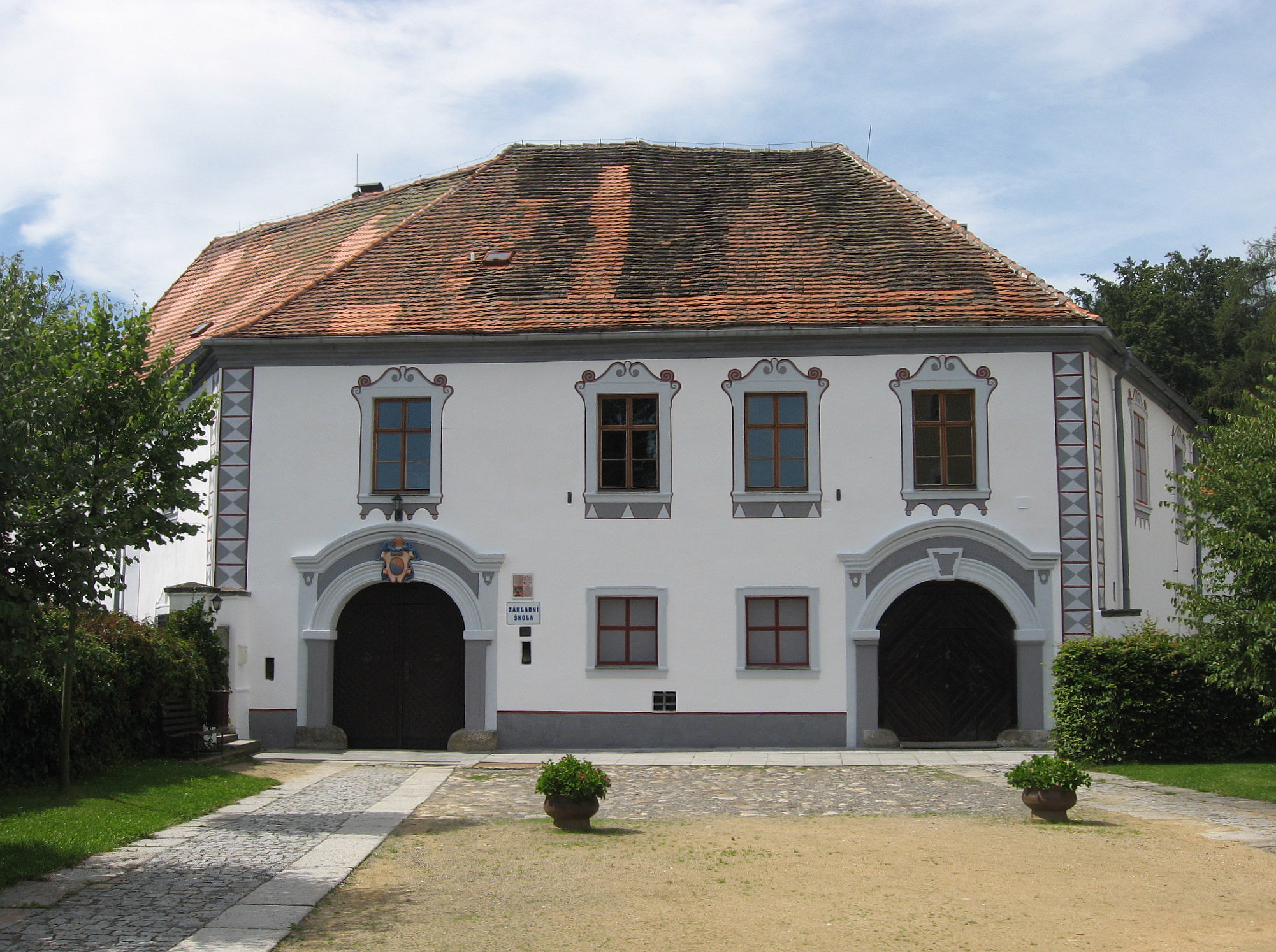
Chanovice Castle

The first written mention of Chanovice is from 1352. In 1468, the village was acquired by the Lords of Dlouhá Ves, who then began to call themselves the Chanovský family. This noble family ruled Chanovice until 1717, when they sold the village to the Rumerskirch family. During their rule, the local castle and other buildings were reconstructed in the Baroque style. From 1809 to 1871, Chanovice belonged to a merchant from Plzeň, Jan Becher, and his son. The next owners of the village were the noble families of Daubek, Schmiedl and Goldegg.

== Demographics ==
Historical population

Year	Pop.	±%
1869	1,760	—
1880	1,735	−1.4%
1890	1,547	−10.8%
1900	1,503	−2.8%
1910	1,519	+1.1%

Year	Pop.	±%
1921	1,420	−6.5%
1930	1,326	−6.6%
1950	1,056	−20.4%
1961	1,024	−3.0%
1970	866	−15.4%

Year	Pop.	±%
1980	817	−5.7%
1991	791	−3.2%
2001	713	−9.9%
2011	748	+4.9%
2021	731	−2.3%

Source: Censuses

== Transport ==
There are no railways or major roads passing through the municipality.

== Sights ==
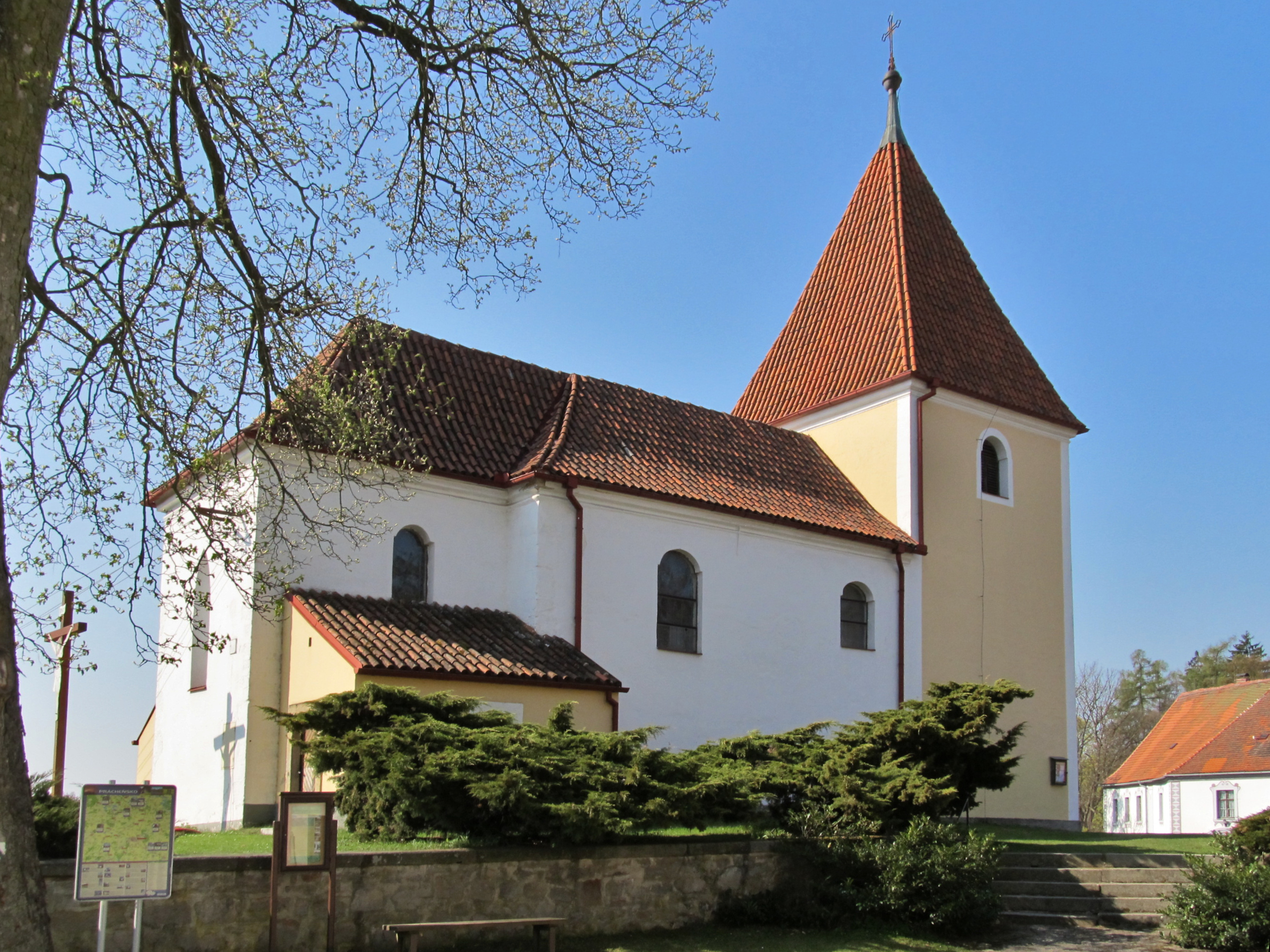
Church of the Exaltation of the Holy Cross

The historic centre of Chanovice is well preserved and protected as a village monument zone. In the northern part of the village is an open-air museum of folk architecture.

The main landmarks of Chanovice are the church and the castle. The Church of the Exaltation of the Holy Cross was originally a Gothic building from the second half of the 13th century, rebuilt in the Baroque style in 1751–1764.

The Chanovice Castle was originally a Gothic fortress from the end of the 13th century. In the Renaissance era, it was rebuilt and extended. After a fire in 1780, the fortress was rebuilt into a Baroque castle. Further modifications date from 1811–1838. Today the castle premises houses a primary school, a library and a museum of folk crafts.
