= Spejbl and Hurvínek Theatre =

Puppet theatre in Prague, Czech Republic

- Divadlo Spejbla a Hurvínka

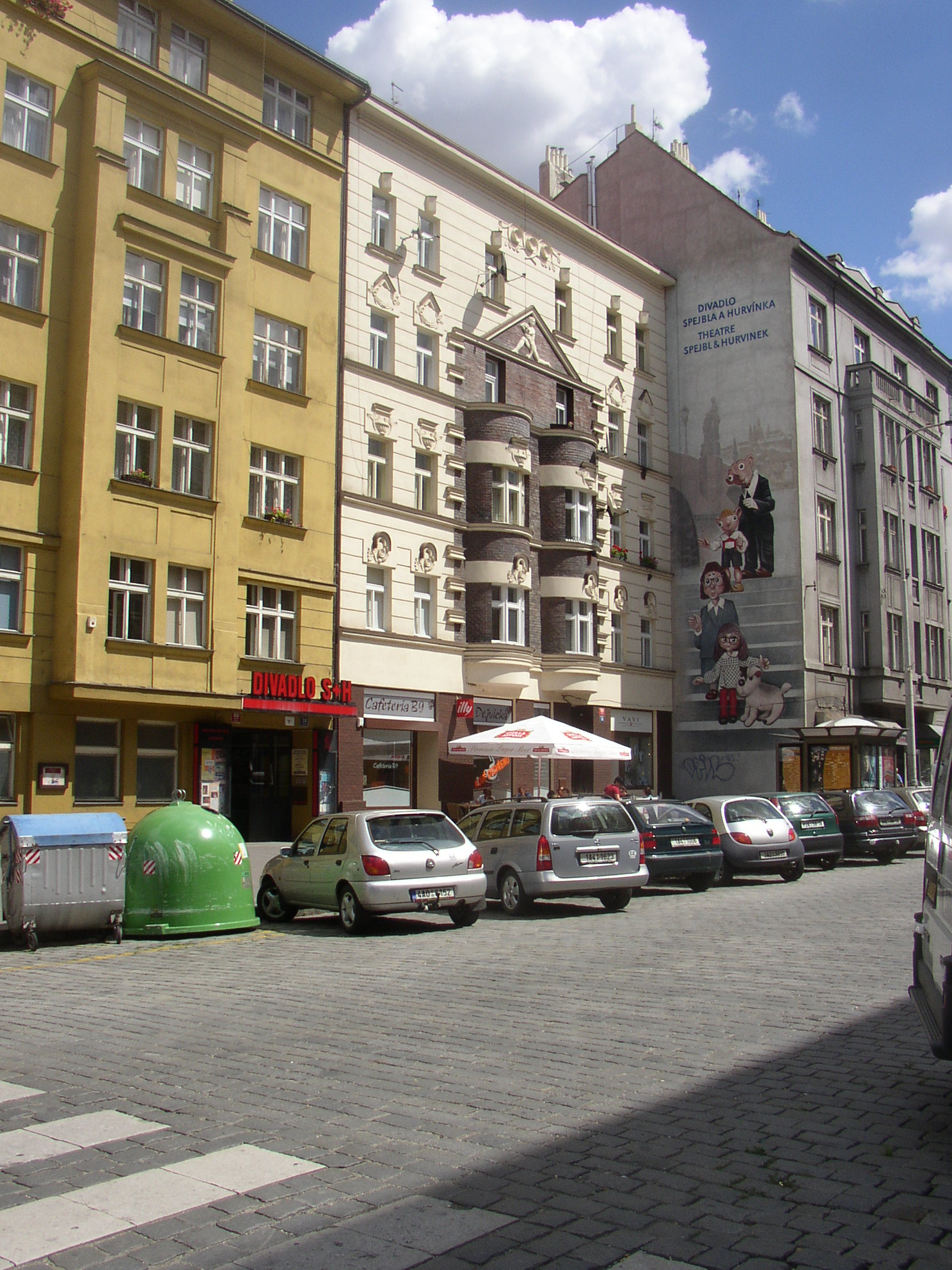
- Spejbl and Hurvinek Theatre in Bubeneč, Prague
- Interactive map of Spejbl and Hurvínek Theatre
- Address: Dejvická 919/38; Prague 6 Czech Republic
- Coordinates: 50.099°N 14.399°E

Construction
- Opened: 1930

Website
- spejbl-hurvinek.cz

Spejbl and Hurvínek Theatre (Czech: Divadlo Spejbla a Hurvínka) is a puppet theatre located in Prague, Czech Republic. Founded in Plzeň in 1930 by puppeteer Josef Skupa, it was the first professional puppeteer's stage in Czechoslovakia. It was named after the puppets Spejbl and Hurvínek, who, alongside Mánička, Ms. Kateřina, and their dog Žeryk (cs), are its main characters. The theatre was closed in early 1944 by the Nazi authorities, until the end of World War II. In 1945, it was relocated to Prague, where it has operated since.

Helena Štáchová, a puppeteer who played the roles of Mánička and Ms. Kateřina in the company, served as the head of Spejbl and Hurvínek Theatre from 1996 until her death, in 2017, following Miloš Kirschner (1956/1966–1996) and Skupa himself (1930–1956). It is currently run by Kirschner and Štáchová's daughter Denisa Kirschnerová. In 2008, a court awarded Štáchová the right to use the theatre's namesake puppets after a multi-year legal dispute, which allowed the establishment to continue its programs.

== History ==
At the start of his career, Josef Skupa worked in Loutkové divadlo Feriálních osad, a Plzeň-based amateur puppet theatre founded in 1913. This is where he first introduced his most notable puppets, the duo of Spejbl and Hurvínek. Spejbl, a disgruntled teacher barely able to keep up with his surroundings, was created in 1920, and Hurvínek, his sometimes lazy, sometimes hyperactive son, in 1926. Skupa subsequently performed with them in cabarets in western Bohemia.

Spejbl and Hurvínek Theatre operated as a touring company until 1943, and Skupa was arrested a year later for anti-Nazi activity during World War II. After his release and the end of the war, the company moved to Prague, where it remains to this day.

Following Skupa's death in 1957, Miloš Kirschner, who had joined the theatre in 1951 and alternated in the lead roles during Skupa's lifetime, became the theatre's director and main puppeteer. After Kirschner's death in 1996, his wife, Helena Štáchová, who had voiced the company's third character, Mánička, since 1969, and helped create the character of Ms. Kateřina, Mánička's grandmother, became the theatre's director. Spejbl and Hurvínek were taken over by Martin Klásek, who, having joined the theatre in 1973, had previously alternated for Kirschner. After Štáchová died in 2017, her and Kirschner's daughter Denisa Kirschnerová became the director.

While most of the theatre's productions are held in Czechia, the ensemble regularly embarks on foreign tours, and they have performed in numerous countries, always in that nation's language.

== Trademark dispute ==
Skupa died childless, and the trademark to his puppets passed to his wife, Jiřina Skupová (née Schwarzová). It was subsequently held by the Municipal Institute of Social Services in Plzeň, which initiated a lawsuit against the theatre company in 1998 in order to obtain a share of the revenue from the puppets. In 2007, the Supreme Court of the Czech Republic upheld Helena Štáchová's rights to the puppets, in her role as director of the theatre at the time.

== Selected personalities ==
=== Puppeteers ===
Spejbl and Hurvínek

- Josef Skupa (1920–1957)
- Miloš Kirschner (1952–1996)
- Martin Klásek (1982–2022)
- Ondřej Lážnovský (?–2022)
- Martin Trecha (2022–)
- Jiřina Skupová (Hurvínek: 1926–1954)
- Bohuslav Šulc (Hurvínek: 1954–1992)
- Miroslav Polák – Hurvínek

Mánička

- Anna Kreuzmannová (1930–1944)
- Božena Weleková (1945–1968)
- Helena Štáchová (1969–2016)
- Marie Šimsová (2016–2022)
- Jana Mudráková (2022–)

Žeryk

- Gustav Nosek (1930–1938)
- František Flajšhanz
- Miroslav Černý
- Miroslav Polák
- Ondřej Lážnovský (?–2022)

Ms. Kateřina

- Helena Štáchová (1971–2017)
- Marie Šimsová (2017–2022)
- Jana Mudráková (2022–)

Others

- Jan Vavřík-Rýz – Mrs. Drbálková

=== Directors ===
- Josef Skupa (1930–1957)
- Jiřina Skupová (1957–1962)
- Ota Popp (1962–1966)
- Miloš Kirschner (1966–1996)
- Helena Štáchová (1996–2017)
- Denisa Kirschnerová (2017–present)

== Gallery ==
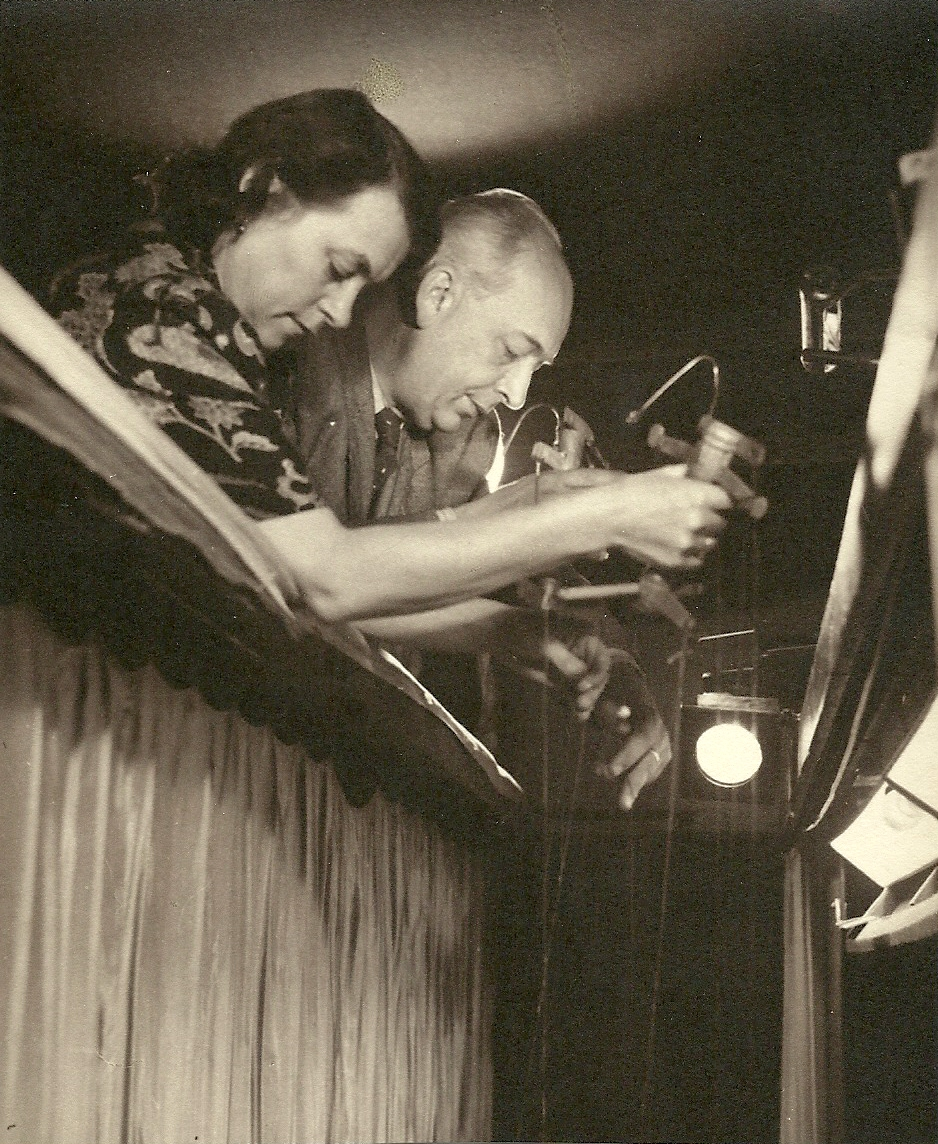
Josef Skupa and his wife, Jiřina Skupová, performing c. 1940

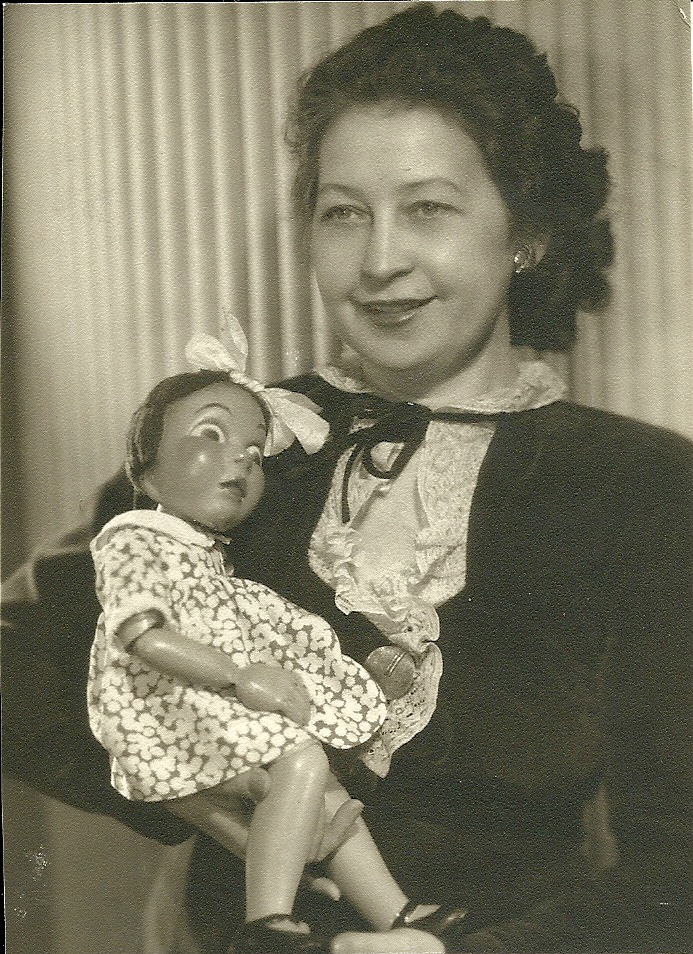
Božena Weleková with Mánička, 1952

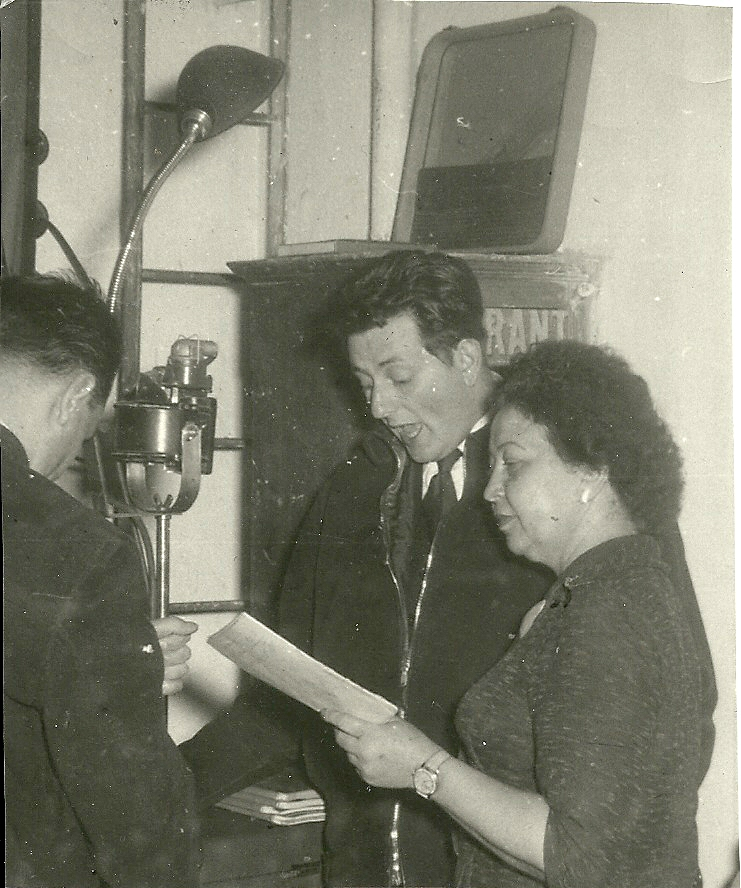
Božena Weleková, Miloš Kirschner, and František Flajšhans, 1958

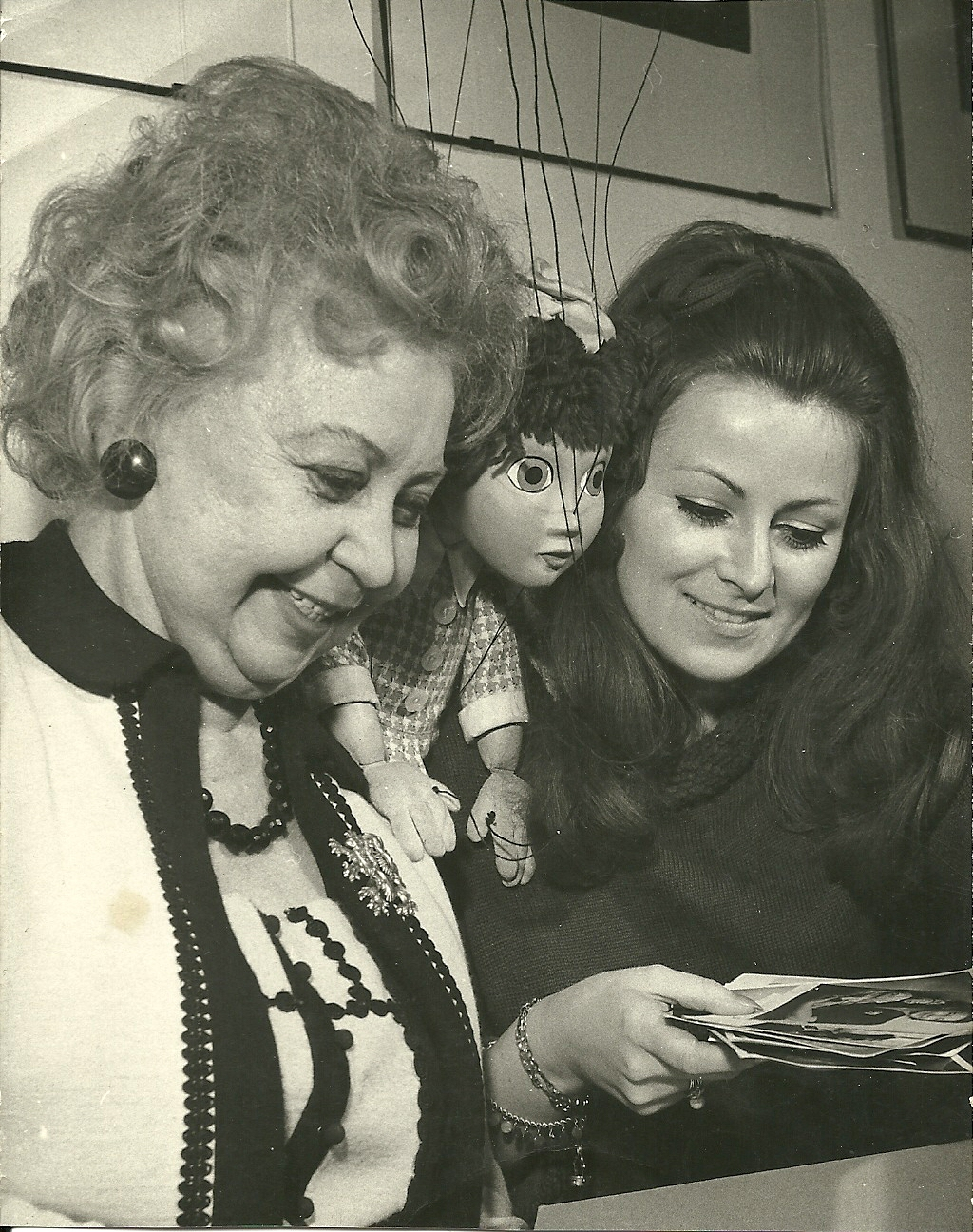
Božena Weleková and Helena Štáchová, 1969

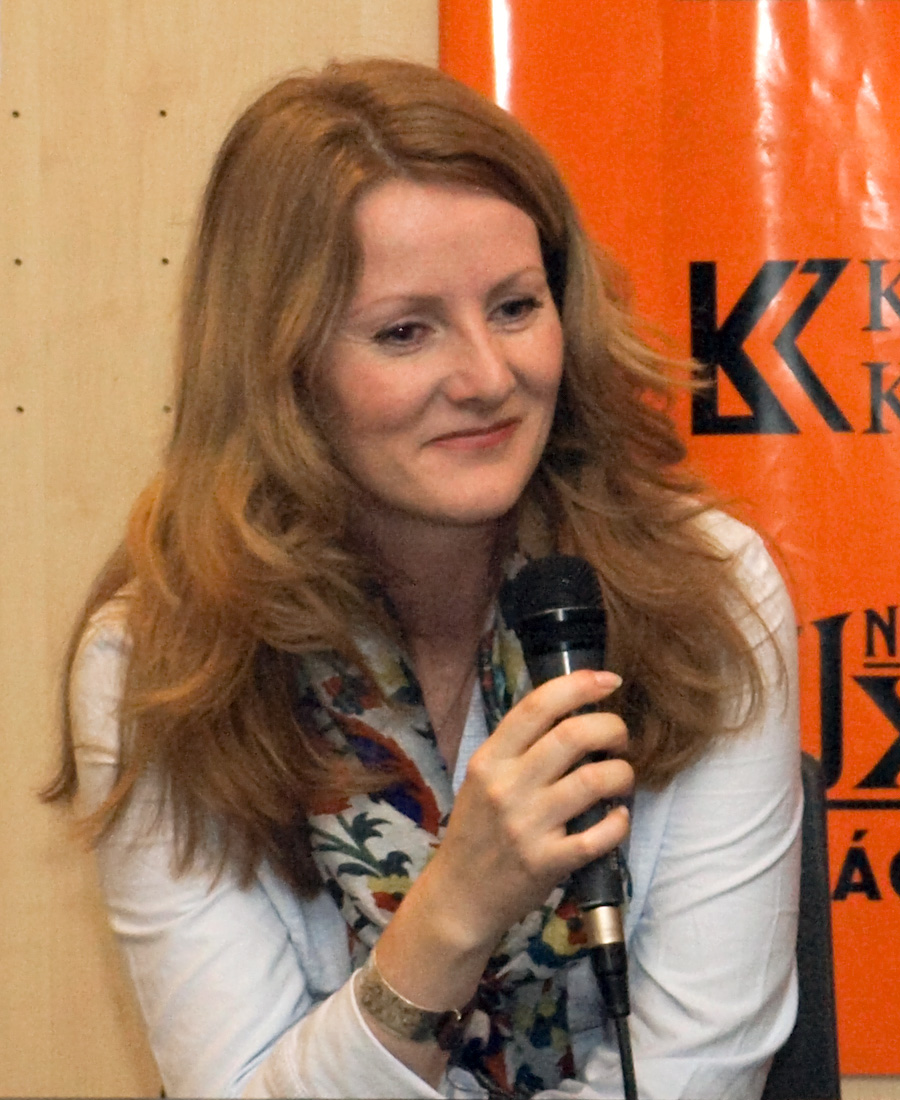
Denisa Kirschnerová, 2011

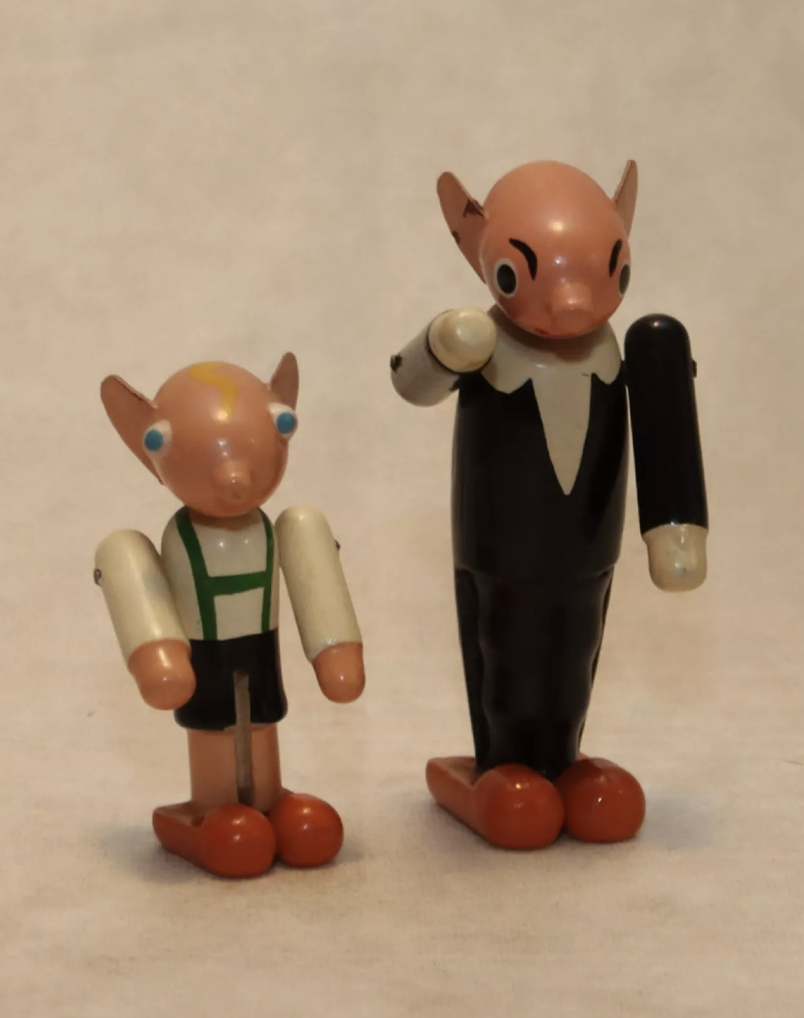
Spejbl and Hurvínek
