= Spejbl and Hurvínek =

Czech puppet comedy duo

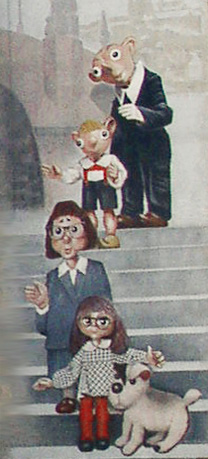
- Painting on theatre facade: top to bottom: Spejbl, Hurvínek, Ms. Kateřina, Mánička, Žeryk
- Created by: Josef Skupa
- Original work: Puppetry
- Years: 1920–present

Films and television
- Film(s): Spejblovo filmové opojení; Hurvínkův rok; Hurvínek na scéně; Harvie and the Magic Museum
- Television series: Hurvínkův rok
- Television short(s): Na návštěvě u Spejbla a Hurvínka; Znovu u Spejbla a Hurvínka; Hurvínek vzduchoplavcem; Hurvínkův rok

Miscellaneous
- Theme park attraction(s): Spejbl and Hurvínek Theatre

Official website
- spejbl-hurvinek.cz

Spejbl and Hurvínek (/s-payble & hoor-vee-neck/) is a Czech puppet comedy duo conceived by puppeteer Josef Skupa. Spejbl was carved by Karel Nosek in 1920 and Hurvínek by his nephew Gustav Nosek in 1926. Over time, their appearances, including physical shapes and costumes, gradually changed, and each carver contributed their unique style.

The duo, which became internationally successful, has its own theatre in Prague. They have appeared in a number of television series and Večerníček titles as well as several full-length films, including the 2017 3D animated Harvie and the Magic Museum. Various comedy albums have been released, each usually containing one story, about the dim-witted father Josef Spejbl and his son Hurvínek, who live in one apartment with Ms. Kateřina and her granddaughter Mánička, as well as the dog Žeryk (cs), who has the ability to bark words.

== History ==
The first of the puppets, created by Josef Skupa in Plzeň in 1920 and carved by Karel Nosek, was Spejbl—a disgruntled teacher barely able to keep up with his surroundings. Skupa performed with him in cabarets in western Bohemia. In 1926, he brought to life Spejbl's son, Hurvínek—a sometimes lazy, sometimes hyperactive son whose puppet was carved by Gustav Nosek. By that time, Skupa had mastered performing with both puppets, even providing voices for them.

The success Skupa had with the two puppets was enough for him to establish a dedicated venue, Spejbl and Hurvínek Theatre, in 1930—the first professional puppeteer's stage in Czechoslovakia. That year, he added two new characters to the set, namely Mánička and the dog Žeryk (cs).

Spejbl and Hurvínek Theatre operated as a touring company until 1943, and Skupa was arrested a year later for anti-Nazi activity during World War II. After his release and the end of the war, the company moved to its current location in Prague.

Skupa delegated the puppeteering work to other artists in the theatre and concentrated on providing voices and writing new plots. After his death in 1957, the next actor to voice Spejbl and Hurvínek was Miloš Kirschner. Mánička was first voiced by Anna Kreuzmannová, then by Božena Weleková from 1945, and by Helena Štáchová, Kirschner's wife, from 1969. In 1971, Štáchová helped create the character of Ms. Kateřina, Mánička's grandmother, and she also voiced her. After Kirschner death in 1996, Martin Klásek became the third interpreter of Spejbl and Hurvínek. He was followed by Ondřej Lážnovský, and after his departure from the theatre in 2022, Martin Trecha took over the roles. Following Štáchová's death in 2017, Marie Šimsová became the voice of Mánička and Mrs. Kateřina, and she was in turn replaced by Jana Mudráková in 2022.

Spejbl and Hurvínek have performed across Czechoslovakia (present-day Czechia and Slovakia) as well as overseas, including in Germany, the United States, Canada, Japan, Taiwan, India, Egypt, Jordan, Mexico, and Spain.

In Skupa's hometown of Plzeň, there is a memorial statue of the puppet duo.

=== Trademark dispute ===
Skupa died childless, and the trademark to his puppets passed to his wife, Jiřina Skupová (née Schwarzová). It was subsequently held by the Municipal Institute of Social Services in Plzeň, which initiated a lawsuit against the theatre company in 1998 in order to obtain a share of the revenue from the puppets. In 2007, the Supreme Court of the Czech Republic upheld Helena Štáchová's rights to the puppets, in her role as director of the theatre at the time.

== Space adventures ==
The minor planets 29472 Hurvínek and 29471 Spejbl, both discovered by Lenka Kotková, are named after the characters.

On 25 May 2022, Hurvínek was sent into space. A two-centimeter glass figurine dressed in a miniature white spacesuit was launched on board the Czech Planetum-1 satellite, carried by a SpaceX Falcon 9 rocket. Planetum 1 was an educational project that involved a control centre at the Prague planetarium. It was the second time a Czech children's character had flown into space, after the Little Mole, who went up twice.

== In popular culture ==
In 2003, Canadian DJ Tiga used an imitation Spejbl puppet in a music video for a cover of the Nelly song "Hot in Herre". This caused consternation among Spejbl and Hurvínek Theatre staff as well as fans, as the likeness was used without permission. Helena Štáchová stated that "This is a blatant violation of our trademark; without a license, no one is allowed to use the puppets for their own purposes". She later said that she liked the video, however, but that "this is an important precedent; we have to handle it properly".

== Characters and puppeteers ==
Spejbl and Hurvínek

- Josef Skupa (1920–1957)
- Miloš Kirschner (1952–1996)
- Martin Klásek (1982–2022)
- Ondřej Lážnovský (?–2022)
- Martin Trecha (2022–)

Mánička

- Anna Kreuzmannová (1930–1944)
- Božena Weleková (1945–1968)
- Helena Štáchová (1969–2016)
- Marie Šimsová (2016–2022)
- Jana Mudráková (2022–)

Žeryk

- Gustav Nosek (1930–1938)
- František Flajšhanz
- Miroslav Černý
- Miroslav Polák

Ms. Kateřina

- Helena Štáchová (1971–2017)
- Marie Šimsová (2017–2022)
- Jana Mudráková (2022–)

== Gallery ==
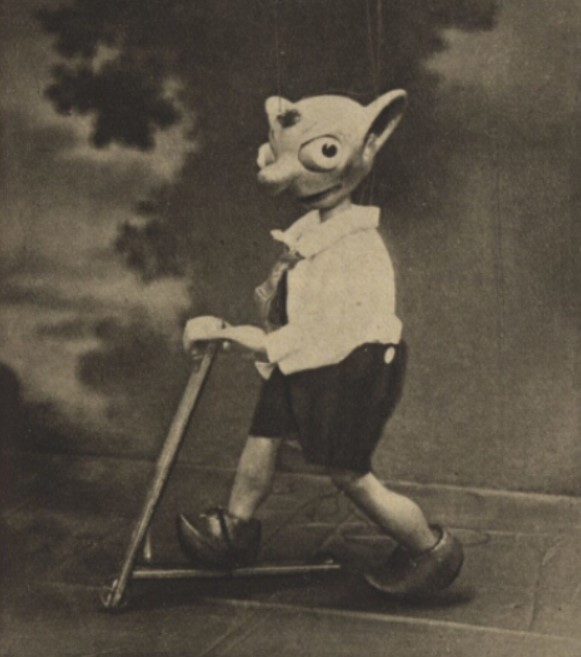
Hurvínek in the Plzeň puppet theatre, 1928

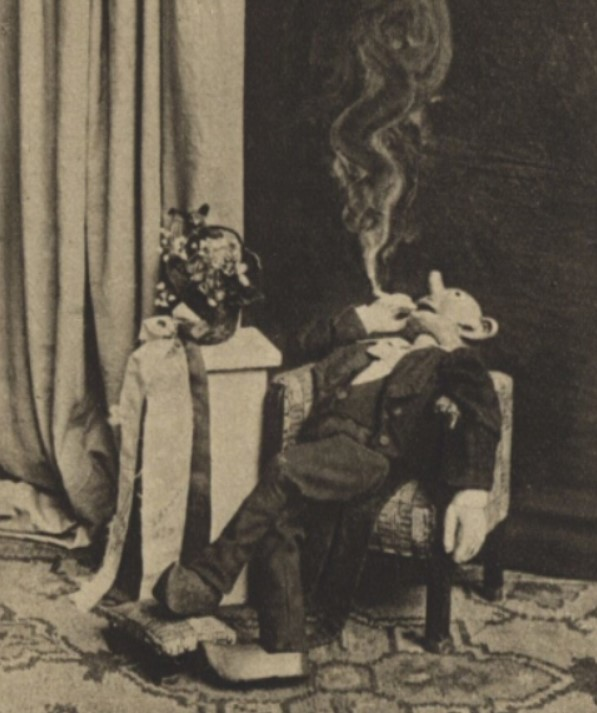
Spejbl in the Plzeň puppet theatre, 1928

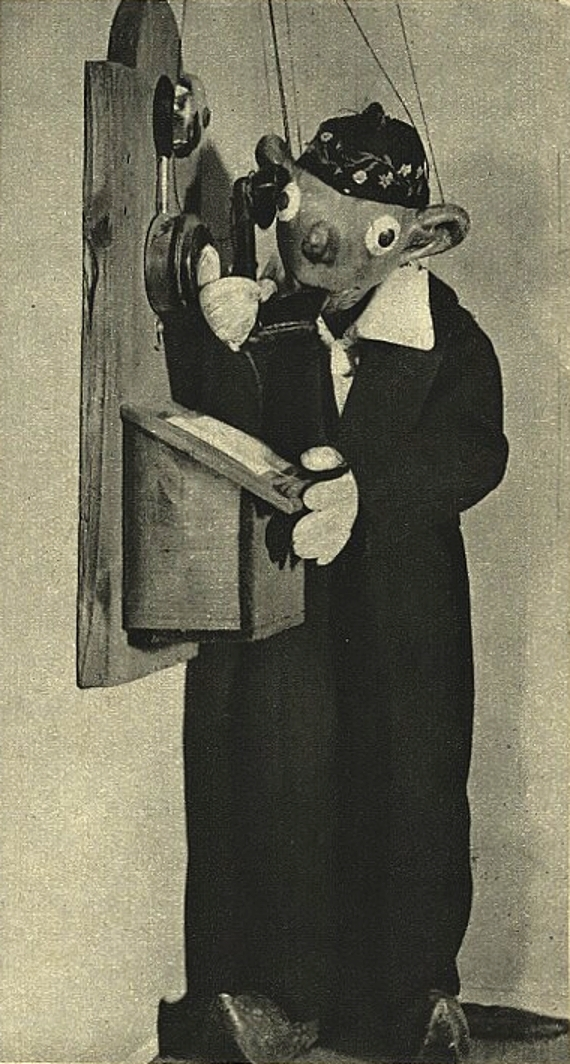
Spejblovo filmové opojení 1931

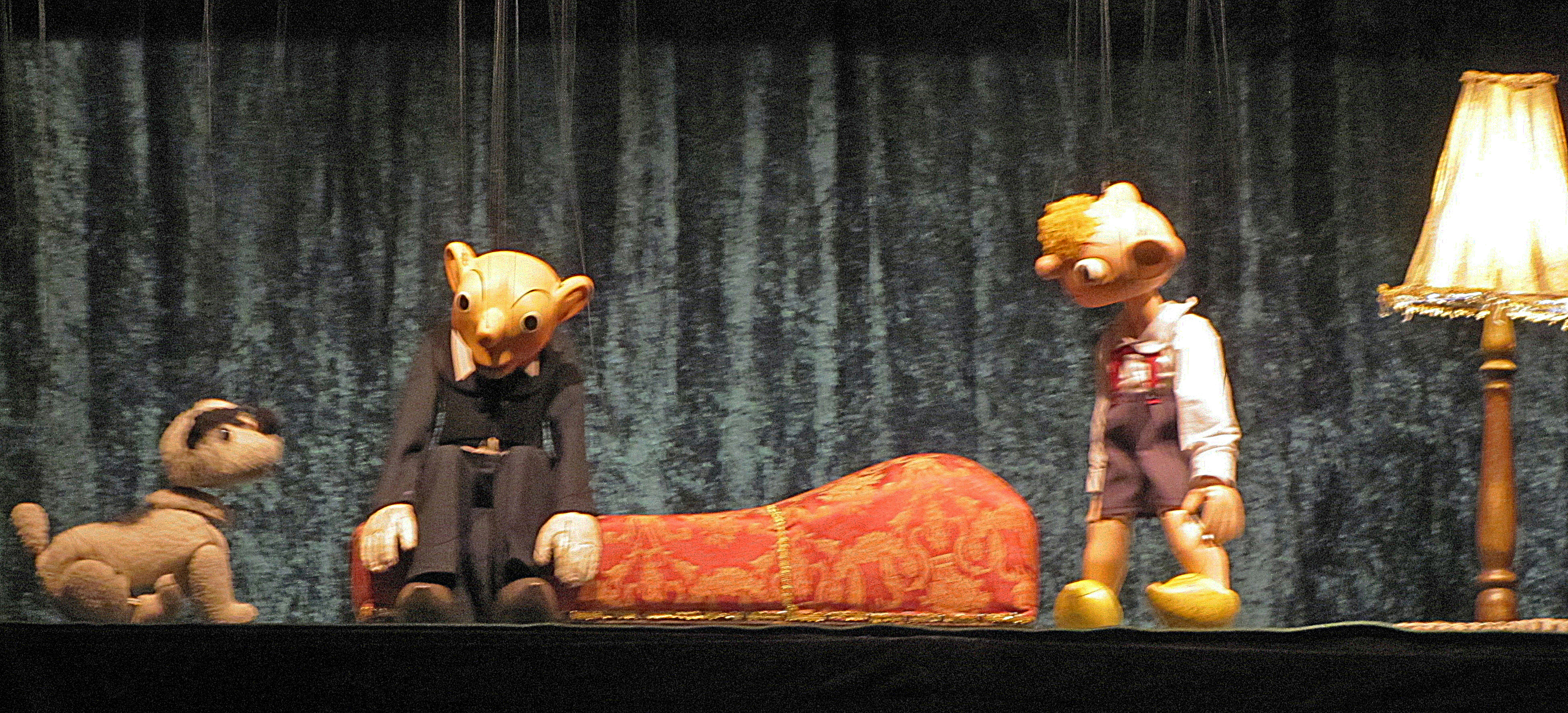
Spejbl, Hurvínek, and Žeryk in Mörfelden-Walldorf, Germany, 2010

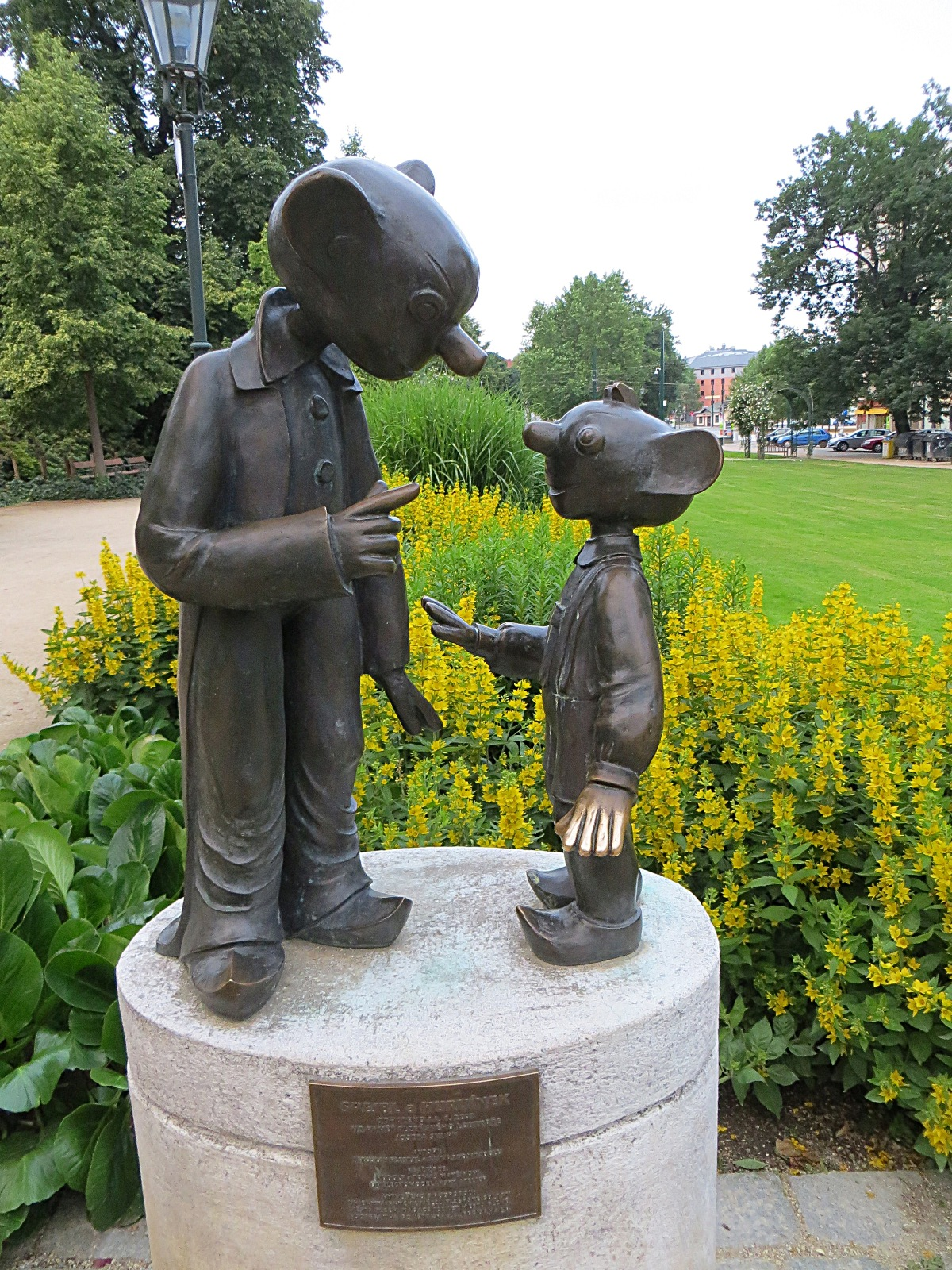
Memorial to Josef Skupa in Plzeň

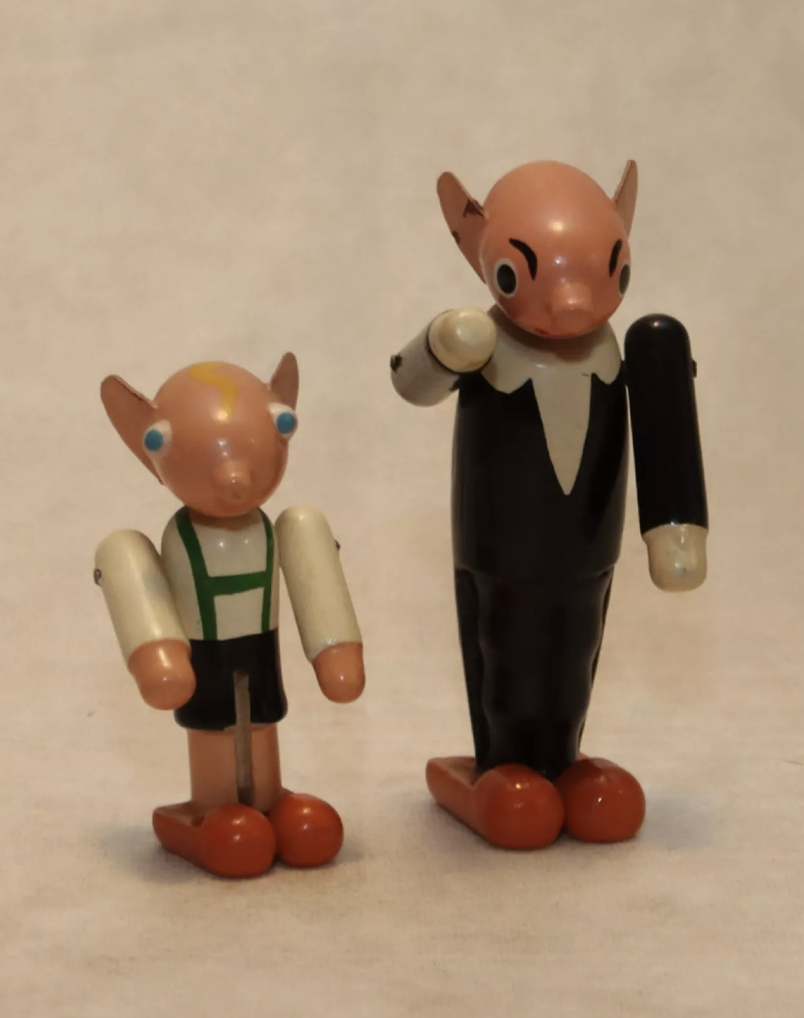
Spejbl and Hurvínek figurines

== Media adaptations ==
Spejbl and Hurvínek have appeared in a number of film and television productions:

=== Večerníček ===
- Na návštěvě u Spejbla a Hurvínka (1972)
- Znovu u Spejbla a Hurvínka (1974–1975)
- Hurvínek vzduchoplavcem (1997)
- Hurvínkův rok (2003)

=== Film ===
- Spejblovo filmové opojení – puppet film (1931)
- Hurvínek na scéně – puppet film (2010)
- Harvie and the Magic Museum – 3D animated film (2017)

== Awards ==
In 2012, Spejbl and Hurvínek received the Special Thalia Award for Lifetime Mastery in the Field of Puppet Theatre.
