= Lichý =

Lichý (feminine: Lichá) is a Czech surname. The word lichý means 'odd' (in arithmetic) and figuratively also 'alone', 'without counterpart' in modern Czech, but in Old Czech it also meant 'dishonest'. Notable people with the surname include:

- Filip Lichý (born 2001), Slovak footballer
- Norbert Lichý (1964–2024), Czech actor
