= Jiří Wolker =

Czech poet (1900–1924)

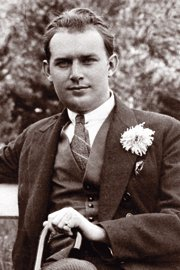
- Jiří Wolker in c. 1923
- Born: Jiří Karel Wolker; 29 March 1900; Prostějov, Austria-Hungary
- Died: 3 January 1924 (aged 23); Prostějov, Czechoslovakia
- Occupation: Poet
- Writing career
- Notable works: Host do domu Těžká hodina

Signature
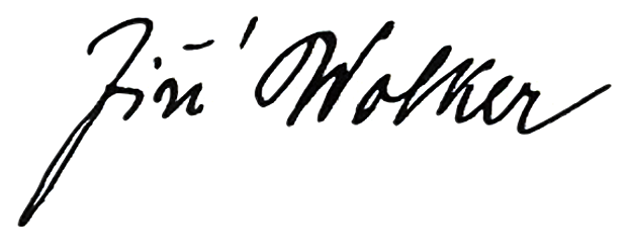

Jiří Wolker (Czech pronunciation: [ˈjɪr̝iː ˈvolkr̩]; 29 March 1900 – 3 January 1924) was a Czech poet. He was also marginally journalist and playwright. Although he lived a short life, he became one of the most important Czech poets.

== Life ==
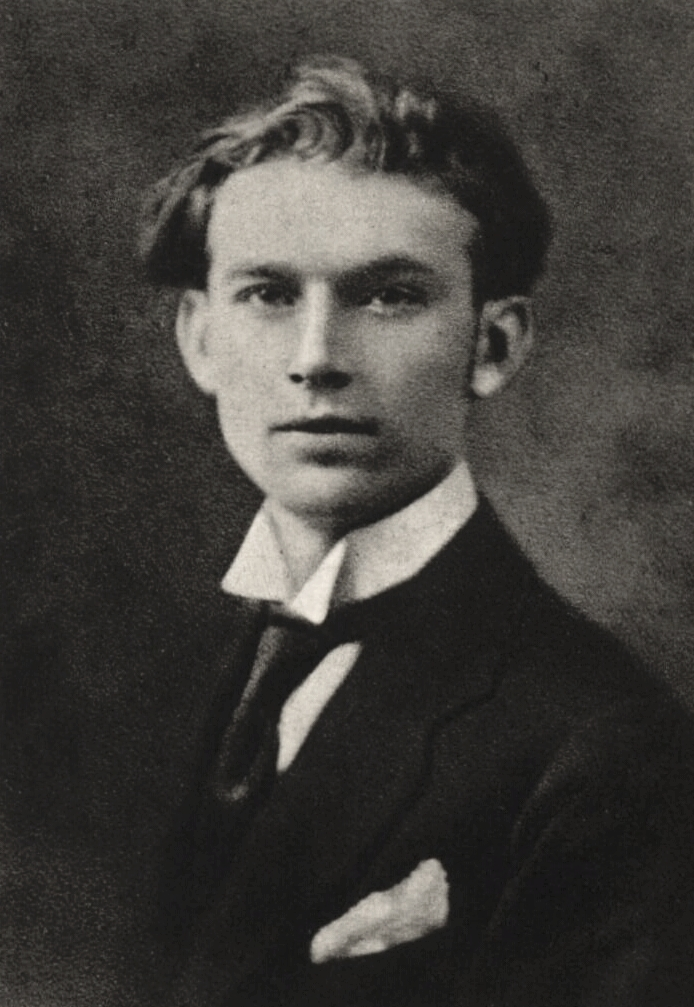
Jiří Wolker in 1919

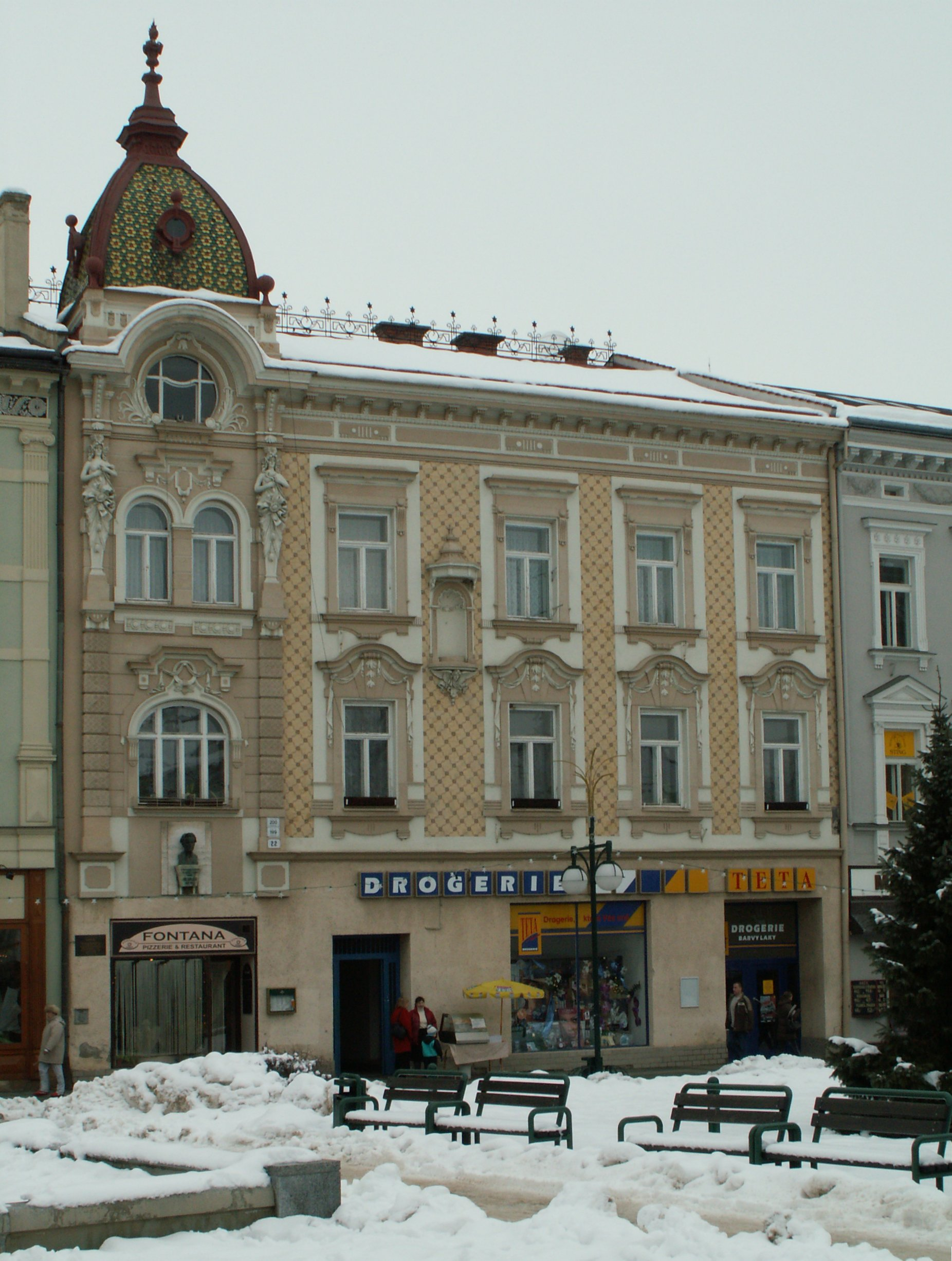
Birthplace of Jiří Wolker with his bust in Prostějov

Jiří Wolker was born on 29 March 1900 in Prostějov. He grew up in a harmonious family. His father was a banker and later a bank director, and his mother was involved in various cultural associations and wrote for magazines and newspapers. He had an older brother. He studied at the Prostějov gymnasium and already at this time he was attracted to literature and began to publish in newspapers.

After he graduated, he moved to Prague. He studied law there, but simultaneously attended lectures of Zdeněk Nejedlý and František Xaver Šalda at the Faculty of Arts, Charles University. As a journalist, he contributed to magazines Kmen, Červen and Var. He joined the association of Czech avant-garde artists Devětsil, but soon left it. Among his friends were Jaroslav Seifert, Karel Toman, Vítězslav Nezval and Konstantin Biebl, all members of Devětsil. During his studies, his parents could only send him a limited amount of money, which he spent on books, so he had to earn extra money by tutoring Czech. In 1921, he left the Roman Catholic Church and joined the Communist Party of Czechoslovakia.

Wolker was known for often having many girls hanging around him and for having multiple girlfriends at the same time. His adventures ended when he was diagnosed with tuberculosis in April 1923. He went to the Tatranská Polianka (a sanatorium and hamlet, part of Vysoké Tatry) for treatment, but the disease progressed and later memory loss also occurred. Shortly before his death, he returned to Prostějov, where he died on 3 January 1924, at age 23. He is buried in Prostějov.

== Work ==
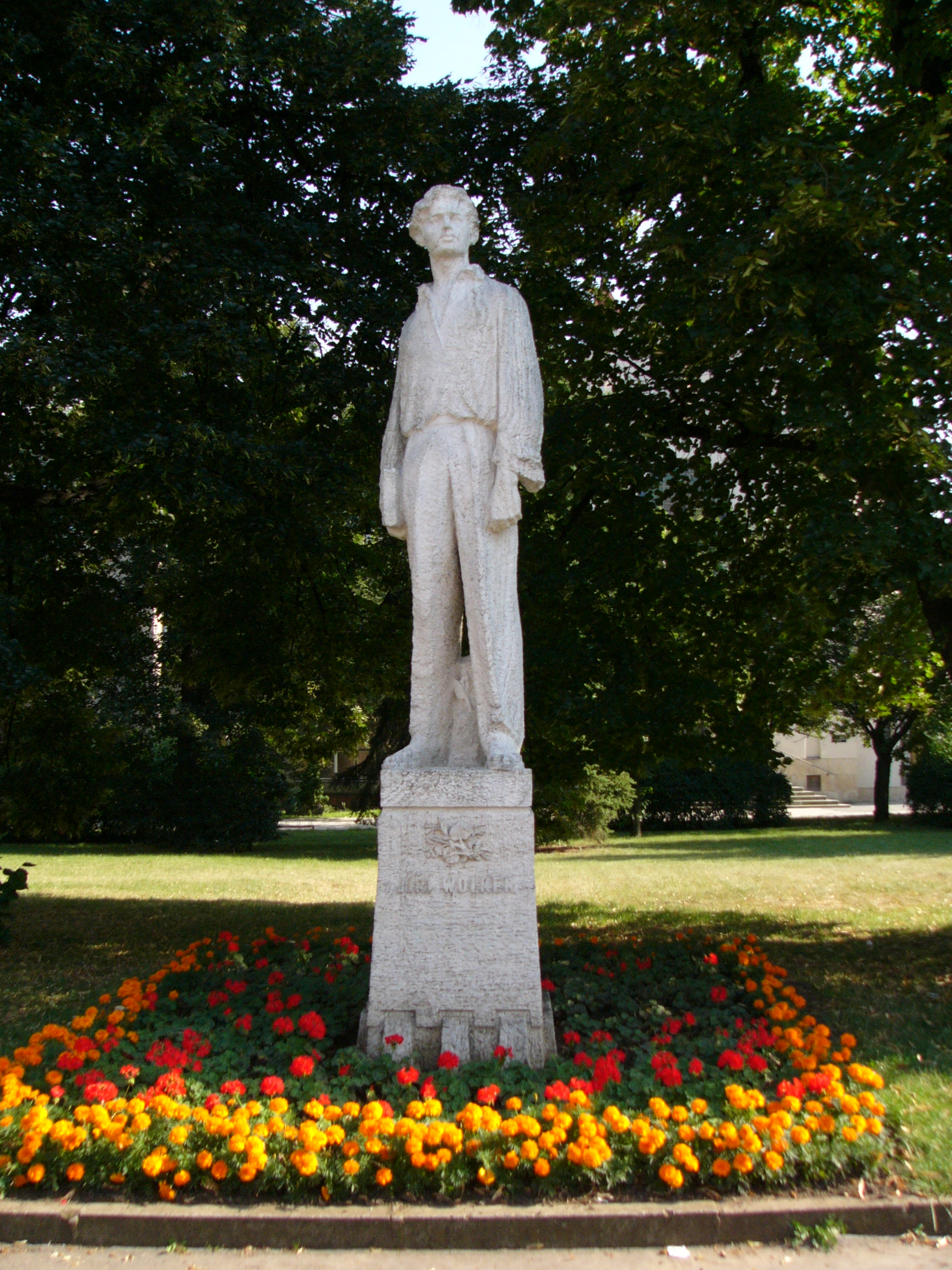
Statue of Jiří Wolker in Prostějov

Wolker is among the most important Czech poets. During his lifetime, he published only three books – Host do domu ('Guest to the House'), Svatý Kopeček and Těžká hodina ('The Heavy Hour'). The poems in Host do domu are characterized by the elements of harmony, lack of conflict, the beauty of life, and love for people and ordinary things. The best poem from the collection is often considered to be Poštovní schránka ('The Mailbox').

Wolker, together with Karel Teige, was the founder of the Czech art movement called Proletářské umění (Proletarian art). That is why he was perceived as a proletarian poet, although he never belonged to the proletariat. This movement primarily depicted the working class, its oppression and exploitation. It was characterized by hatred of war and a desire for a fair world. The collection Těžká hodina contains typical poems of this artistic direction, e.g. Balada o očích topičových ('The Eyes of the Stoker').

Wolker also wrote dark fairy tales and raw erotic work, but he did not publish it during his lifetime.

Wolker's well-known work is his own epitaph, which he wrote before his death:

"Here lies Jiří Wolker, the poet who loved the world and went to battle for its justice. Before he could set his heart to the fight, he died young at the age of twenty-four."

=== List of works ===
- Host do domu (1921) – poetry
- Svatý Kopeček (1921) – poetry (in later editions it became part of Host do domu)
- Proletářské umění (1922) – manifesto, together with Karel Teige
- Těžká hodina (1922) – poetry
- Tři hry (1923) – plays
- Do boje, lásko, leť (1923) – poetry, letters to his girlfriend and his own epitaph

== Honours and legacy ==
The Museum and Gallery in Prostějov has a permanent literary exhibition of the work of Jiří Wolker.

Every year, a poetry festival called Wolker's Prostějov is held in Prostějov.

Wolker's birthplace on T. G. Masaryka Square in Prostějov is a house with a Renaissance and Gothic core, protected as a cultural monument. It is equipped with a commemorative plaque and a bust of Wolker. A bronze statue of Jiří Wolker was unveiled in 2018 on a bench opposite his birthplace.

In Svatý Kopeček (today part of Olomouc) is a house where Wolker visited his grandmother and spent a lot of time there. Today it is called Wolker's Villa and there is a memorial plaque with his bust on it.

Dozens of cities and towns in the Czech Republic have a street named after Jiří Wolker, including Prague (Bubeneč), Plzeň, Liberec, Olomouc, Hradec Králové and Pardubice.
