= Konstantin Biebl =

Czech poet and writer

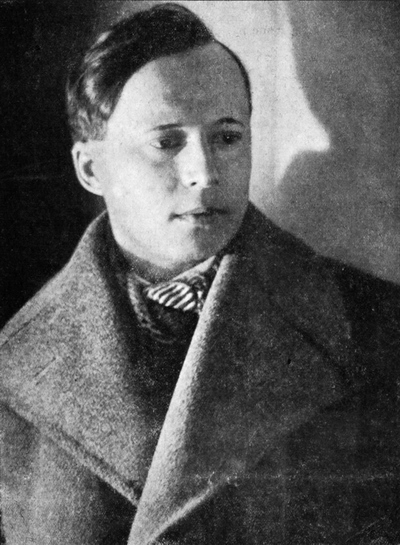
- Konstantin Biebl
- Born: 26 February 1898; Slavětín, Austria-Hungary
- Died: 12 November 1951 (aged 53); Prague, Czechoslovakia
- Occupation: Poet
- Spouse: Marie Bieblová
- Writing career
- Notable works: S lodí jež dováží čaj a kávu Nový Ikaros

Signature
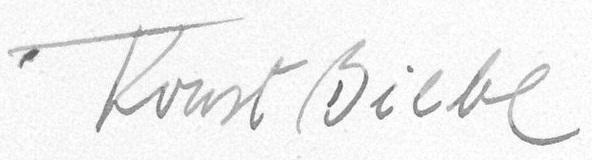

Konstantin Biebl (26 February 1898 – 12 November 1951) was a Czech poet and writer. His first collection of poems was released in 1923, and his last in 1951, the year of his death by suicide. During that time he also travelled widely as a reporter. Biebl was a member of the Communist Party Czechoslovakia, and was closely associated with other Czech Communist writers and poets including Jiří Wolker and Vítězslav Nezval.

== Biography ==
=== Early life ===
Konstantin Biebl was born in Slavětín near Louny, Bohemia, then Austria-Hungary. His father was a dentist in Louny, given to writing poetry and painting. He committed suicide in 1916 while serving as a surgeon in Galicia. Arnošt Ráž, a brother of Konstantin's mother, was a poet. Konstantin studied at gymnasium first in Louny (1909–1914) and then in Malá Strana, Prague. In 1916 he was recruited into the army and sent to Sambir. When his father died, he was sent home where he partly faked tuberculosis (the diagnosis was uncertain) and was hospitalized in Louny. He completed his studies in Prague in June 1917 and was sent to the Balkan Front. He fought in Montenegro and was injured, taken captive, and condemned to death. He escaped, and, suffering from tuberculosis, was hospitalized in Sarajevo and from there transported to Louny (Jiří Wolker was inspired by his war tale and wrote a short story called Ilda about it).

=== Literary career ===
He wrote his first poems in a student almanac, and sketched an unpublished collection called Songs of a Tubercular Patient. Soon he joined the new avant-garde literary groups Devětsil, Brno Literary Group and others. In 1921 he started studying medicine at Charles University in Prague which he never finished. In the same year he made friends with Jiří Wolker with whom he went to the Kingdom of Serbs, Croats and Slovenes in 1922 (to get treatment for TB, which caused Wolker's death in 1924; a girl he met there, Jarmila Mikšovská, was also ill with this lethal disease). They stayed in Baška on the island of Krk. In the same year Biebl entered the Communist Party. In 1923 he published his first book of poems together with his uncle Arnošt Ráž – Cesta k lidem (Voyage to the People; the foreword was written by Zdeněk Kalista). When Jiří Wolker died, Biebl edited the almanac In memoriam where many Czech poets described their relationship to the poet, including Jaroslav Seifert, Vítězslav Nezval and Josef Hora.

In 1925 he went to France, visited many World War I battlefields and wrote literary reports for magazines. When he decided to leave medicine he went to Louny to organize cultural and social life. In 1926 he was offered an opportunity to sail to Java, by his friend Olga whose brother-in-law was on the island. Thus in 1926–1927 he accomplished his furthest voyage to Ceylon, Sumatra and Java. He was shocked by the ignorance of European settlers in the area and by colonial practices towards the locals. He talked to rebels from the communist and nationalist movements and was interrogated by the police. The voyage inspired Biebl to write a well-known collection of poems and several short stories, and he returned to the topic in most of his following works.

In 1927 he fell in love with Marie Bulovová, daughter of a rich ironmonger from Louny. His friend Karel Konrád who introduced them told Biebl, "There is dough."

In 1929 the most famous of his poems were published – Nový Ikaros (New Icarus). When seven communist poets (Jaroslav Seifert, Josef Hora, Ivan Olbracht, Stanislav Kostka Neumann and others) stood against the new Communist leader Klement Gottwald and left the party, Biebl was in the pro-Moscow group of poets with Julius Fučík, Vítězslav Nezval, František Halas and Karel Teige.

In 1931 Biebl married Marie Bulovová in Louny. His best man was Karel Teige; among the wedding guests were Jiří Voskovec, Jaroslav Ježek, Vítězslav Nezval, Adolf Hoffmeister and others. Konstantin Biebl became a well-off communist poet. They spent their honeymoon in France, Algeria and Tunisia.

He worked as a dental assistant in his mother's office in the 1930s. He also became active in the Czech Surrealist movement and signed most of the documents published by the Surrealist group in Czechoslovakia. He wrote little and did not acknowledge his previous work, except in 1936 when he published several poems to the memory of Karel Hynek Mácha.

=== Later life ===
During World War II he worked in film with the Melantrich publishing house. After the war he worked in the film department of Ministry of Information. He was excited by the upcoming times of social justice which he saw in the communist government after February 1948, when he celebrated his 50th birthday.

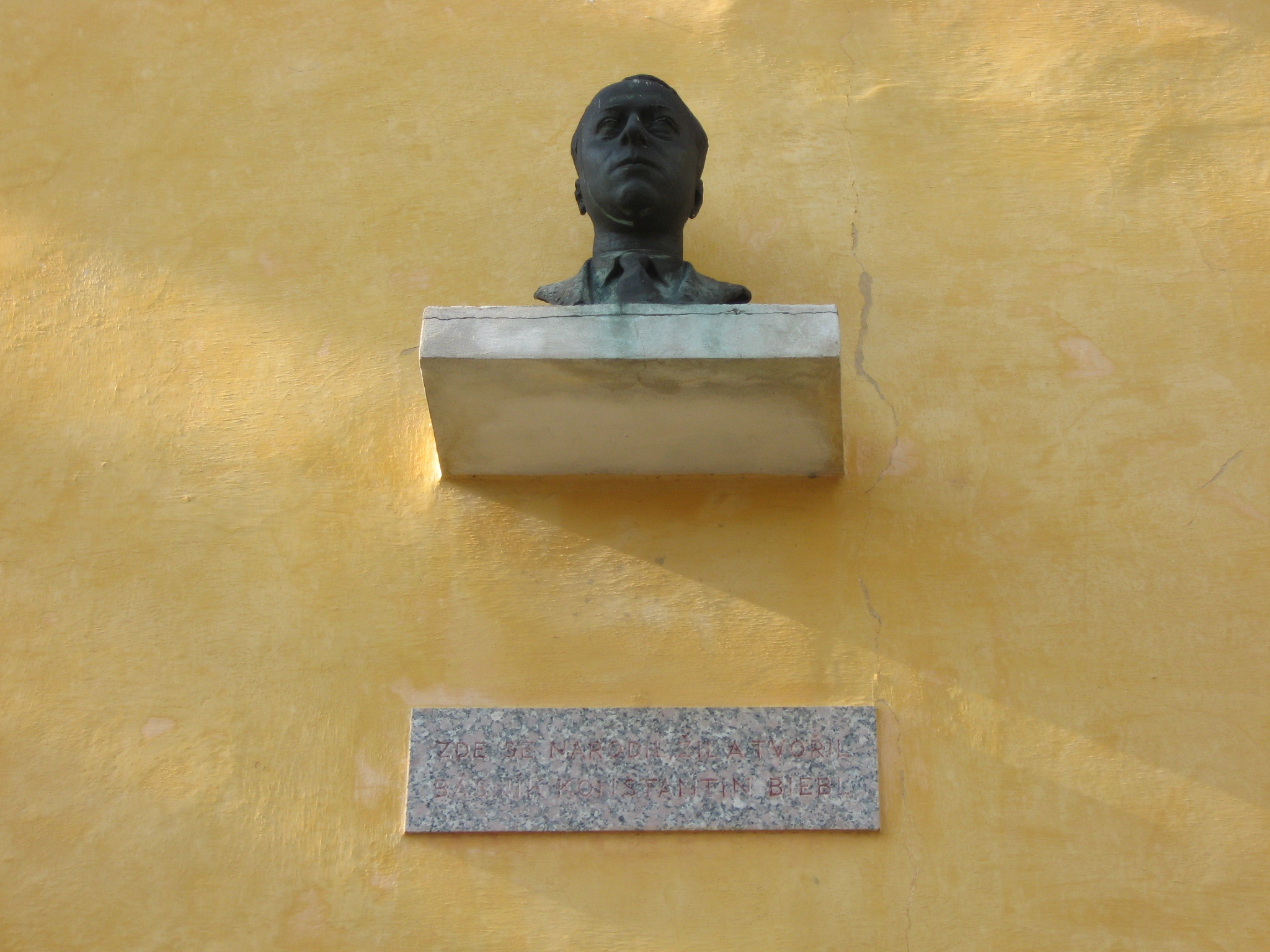
Memorial plaque and bust at the house where Konstantin Biebl was born in Slavětín

In 1949 he became ill with pancreatitis and went to Karlovy Vary for a cure at the spa. He published his largest book (in its largest edition – over 10,000 copies), the collection of poems Bez obav (Unafraid) in 1951. He committed suicide in Prague, where he jumped out of a window on the fifth floor on 12 November 1951 (several sources state 11 November for the jump). Vítězslav Nezval wrote an excusatory poem Kosťo, proč nezdvihs aspoň telefon? (Kosta, why didn't you just pick up the phone?). The circumstances and especially the cause of the suicide have never been clear.

== Works ==
- Cesta k lidem (1923)
- Věrný hlas (1924)
- Zlom (1925)
- Zloděj z Bagdadu (1925)
- Zlatými řetězy (1926)
- Modré stíny (1926)
- S lodí jež dováží čaj a kávu (1927)
- Nový Ikaros (1929)
- Nebe peklo ráj (1930)
- Plancius (1931)
- Zrcadlo noci (1939)
- Bez obav (1951)
- Cesta na Jávu (1958)

== See also ==
- List of Czech writers
