= Zet Molas =

Avant garde Czech film director

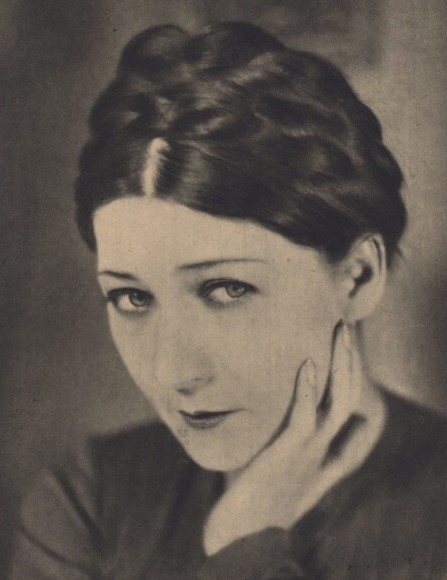
- Molas in a promotional image from the film The Miller and His Child
- Born: Zdena Holubová; 18 March 1896; Hradec Králové, Austria-Hungary
- Died: 1956 (aged 59–60); Munich, West Germany
- Occupation(s): Film director, actress, critic, and screenwriter
- Style: Avant-garde

Zet Molas (born Zdena Holubová, married name Zdenka Smolová; 18 March 1896 – 1956) was a Czech avant-garde film director, actress, critic and screenwriter. She was the third ever female Czech director.

== Career ==
Molas was born in the area of Pražské Předměstí of Hradec Králové in Bohemia, Austria-Hungary, in 1896 to a middle-class railway clerk, and spent part of her childhood in Vienna. She attended the Academy of Arts, Architecture and Design in Prague, under the sculptor Otakar Španiel. There, she studied poetry as well as theater. After her time at the AAAD, she studied at the École des Beaux-Arts in Paris.

Molas began her career in film after returning to Prague, where she funded her first film, Závěť podivínova, thanks to her husband Bohumil Smol, who was a businessman. After the film was completed, she began work in France on an adaptation of the Théophile Gautier novel Mademoiselle De Maupin, on which she was to star as well as write and direct. However, the production ran into problems and Molas returned to Prague.

Back in Prague, she became editor-in-chief and publisher for the magazine Český filmový svět (Czech Film World), where she wrote and published articles on the subject of film and the arts, including a number of contributions from members of the left-wing association Devětsil. She and her husband co-owned and managed the magazine from 1926 to 1927.

Molas was the owner of a production company named Molas-film. During her tenure as editor-in-chief of the magazine, a number of films were announced but stalled in production, including another adaptation of Mademoiselle De Maupin called Ženy nedohledáš (You Won’t Find the Women), Hříšnice a zákon (The Sinner and the Law), Karneval (Carnival), and Milostná mámení (Love Seductions), an adaptation of a play by Frank Tetauer.

In 1928, she finally made a comeback to the film industry with Mlynář a jeho dítě (the Miller and His Child), an adaptation of a play by Ernst Raupach. The film, which contains supernatural elements, is considered to be the first Czech foray into surrealism in film. In 1930, she created the movie Pancéřové auto (Armored Car), an action crime comedy. Afterwards, she went to Germany, Italy and France to study. She made a comeback in the film industry in 1936–1937 with screenwriting for Miroslav Cikán’s comedy Lojzička (1936), and with her most important work, Karel Hynek Mácha, a biography. The film lacked the avant-garde approach of Molas' previous work, being a more typical epic drama with large setpieces, the largest constructions to have ever been used in Czech film to that date. The film received praise from the press.

After Karel, Molas wrote a number of screenplays. However, she never returned to directing. Under the Germany Protectorate of Bohemia and Moravia, Molas and her husband aligned with the German occupation. Her husband served as the Secretary of the Film Division of the Reich Protectorate Office and supervised the Aryanization of the Adria Theater. After World War II, she was forced to resettle in West Germany, where she died in obscurity.

She died in 1956.

=== Personal life ===
Molas' first married name was Grossman, after which she divorced and married her second husband, Bohumil Smol. The two lived in Prague.

In 1925, she had an affair with poet Vítězslav Nezval, who published a number of works in the magazine she edited, Český filmový svět.

== Work ==
=== Filmography ===
- 1923 - Testament of the Stranger (original story, screenplay, direction)
- 1928 - The miller and his child (screenplay, direction, casting, role of the miller's daughter Maria)
- 1929 - Armored Car (theme, screenplay, role of Hamilton's daughter Bessa)
- 1936 – Lojzička (screenplay)
- 1937 – Karel Hynek Mácha (screenplay, director, editor)
- Panna (The Virgin) (screenplay)
- Milostná mámení (Amorous Delusions) (screenplay)
- Princezna Pampeliška (Princess Dandelion) (screenplay)
