= Milča Mayerová =

Czech choreographer and dancer

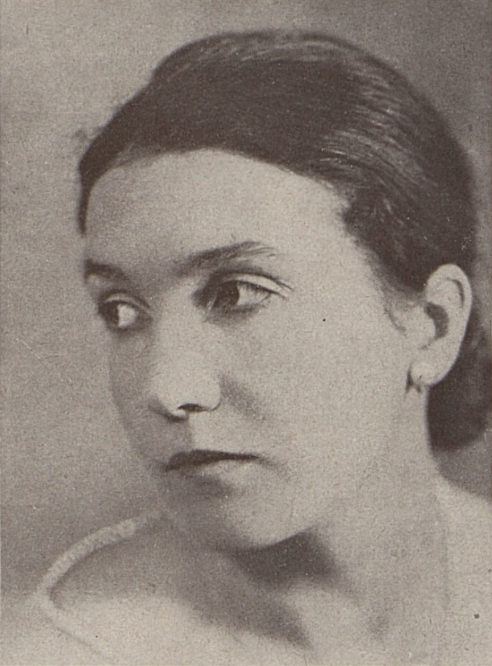

Milča Mayerová (born Milada Mayerová; 12 April 1901 – 22 September 1977) was a Czech dancer and choreographer.

== Biography ==
Mayerová was born in Prague. She was the daughter of Milada Mayerová (née Ottová) and Jaroslav Mayer. She is known for her contributions to the book Abeceda ('Alphabet'), published by Otto and Company in 1926. The book is a compilation of poems written by Vítězslav Nezval and photomontage layouts by Karl Teige that feature choreographed stills of Mayerová. The photographs in the photomontage layouts were taken by Karel Paspa. Nezval, Teige, Paspa, and Mayerová were all members of the Czech avant-garde group Devětsil, and Abeceda is considered "a landmark achievement in European modernism". Mayerová performed the accompanying dance to the Abeceda poem several times at the Osvobozené divadlo in Prague in 1926 and 1927.

Mayerová was a student of Rudolf von Laban, creator of Labanotation.

Mayerová was married twice, first to the architect Jaroslav Fragner, who was also a member of Devětsil, and later to the historian Antonín Friedl.

She died in Prague in 1977, at the age of 76. She is buried in her family's grave at Vyšehrad cemetery.

== Legacy ==
A recreation of Mayerová's choreographed piece was part of the exhibit 'Dreams and Disillusion: Karel Teige and the Czech Avant-Garde' at the Wolfsonian at Florida International University. This exhibit ran from 2000 to 2001 and also traveled to the Grey Museum of Art at New York University and the Smart Museum of Art in Chicago. Paulina Olowska has performed a piece inspired by Abeceda multiple times, including at the Galerie Meerrettich in Berlin (2005), the Museum of Modern Art in New York (2012), the Museum of Modern Art in Warsaw (2014), and London's Mimosa House (2019). Abeceda also inspired a performance at UNC Chapel Hill called "Haunted" in collaboration with the university's Rare Book Collection in 2014. Ellen Jilemnická produced a book of poetry in 2022, also called Abeceda, inspired by the original produced by Mayerová, Teige, Nezval, and Paspa.
