= Karel Konrád =

Czech writer and journalist

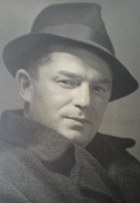
- Born: 22 March 1899; Louny, Austria-Hungary
- Died: 11 December 1971 (aged 72); Prague, Czechoslovakia
- Occupations: Writer and journalist

Karel Konrád (22 March 1899 – 11 December 1971) was a Czech writer and journalist.

== Biography ==
Konrád was born on 22 March 1899 in Louny. He was born in the family of a flour trader. He studied at the Louny school together with his friend Konstantin Biebl, where he graduated in 1917. He had to enlist in the army practically immediately after graduation. After the First World War, he took part as a volunteer in the occupation of Slovakia by the Czechoslovak army.

He studied chemistry at the Technical University, then history and geography at Charles University, none of which he completed. For a short period he worked as a teacher but was dismissed for his left-wing convictions.

From 1923 Konrád devoted himself exclusively to journalism and literature. He became a member of the Devětsil where he became a representative of the Poetist movement and from 1925, worked as an editor in the Communist daily newspaper Rudé právo, but left the editorial office in 1930. In the same year he was a co-founder of the magazine Trn, which he edited until 1933.

In December 1939, he married Milena Polanová, the daughter of the literary critic and poet Bohumil Polan.

From 1945 until 1948 he again worked for Rudé právo. In 1946 he joined Barrandov Studios, where he served on various advisory boards until 1957, when he retired.

Konrád traveled to France and Italy in 1930, and after 1945 to Yugoslavia, the USSR and Poland. He wrote reports about post-war travels.
