= Kameni, přicházíš... =

Poetic book by Czech author Vladimír Holan

Kameni, přicházíš... (You are coming, stone...) is a poetic book by Czech author Vladimír Holan. It was first published in 1937. Later it was included into the first volume of poet's collected works, named Jeskyně slov that was printed in 1965. It was published once again in 1970. Among poems in the book there are Služebnost, Není více, Antaios, Jaro, Smrt Larisy Reisnerové, Cestou Alpami, Monolog, Zpěv pastýřův, Hudba and Listopadová vichřice. Another important poem is K.H.M. dedicated to Karel Hynek Mácha, the greatest Czech romantic poet. Poems in the book are written chiefly in irregular iambic verse. There are excellent examples of alliteration, too.
