= Vyšehrad Cemetery =

Cemetery in Prague, Czech Republic

- Vyšehradský hřbitov
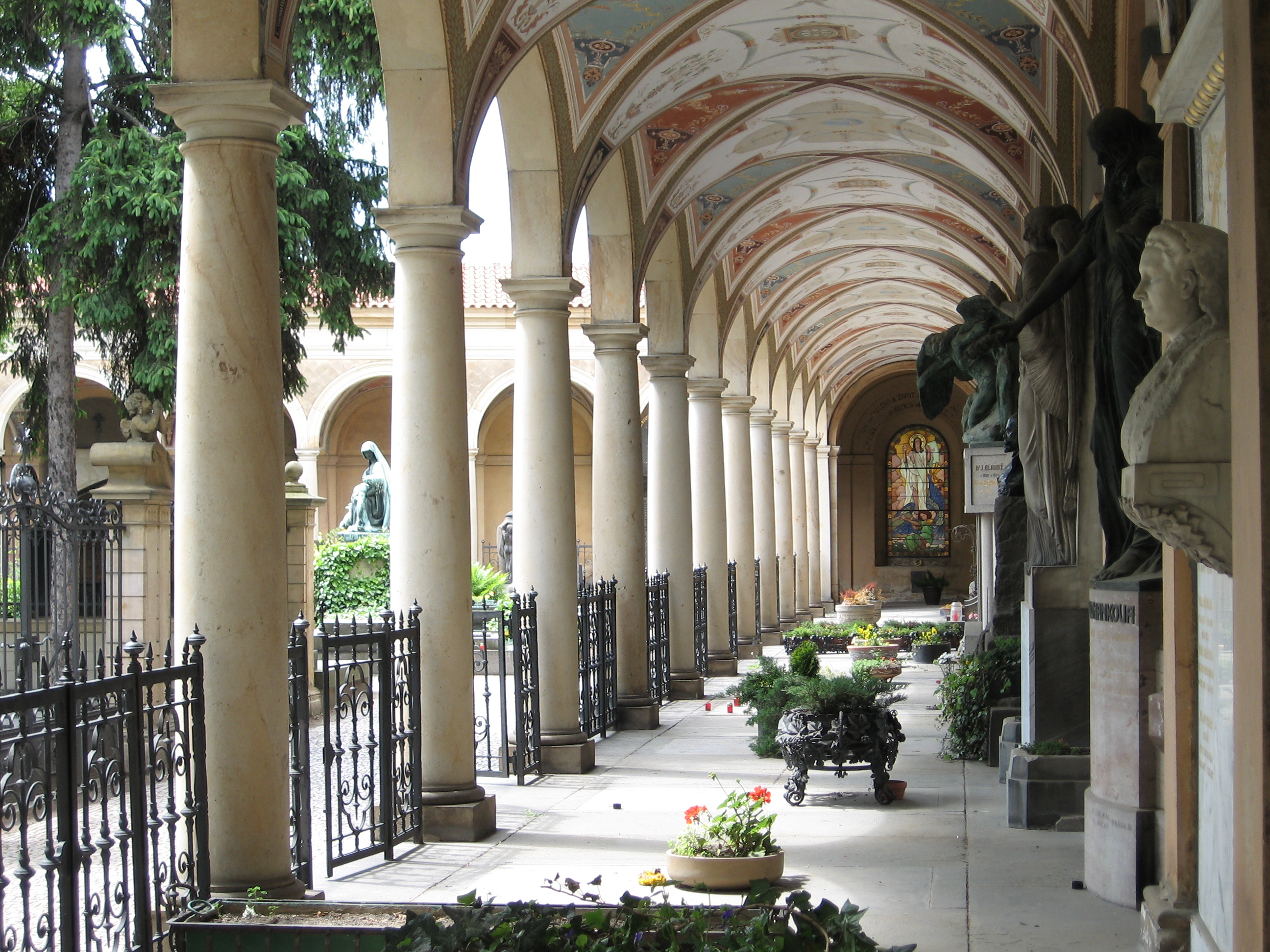
- Arcade of the cemetery
- Interactive map of Vyšehrad Cemetery

Details
- Established: 1660, 1869
- Location: Prague
- Country: Czech Republic
- Coordinates: 50°3′54″N 14°25′4″E
- Type: Public
- Size: 0.81 hectares (2.0 acres)
- No. of graves: 1,200

Vyšehrad Cemetery (Czech: Vyšehradský hřbitov) is a graveyard in Prague, Czech Republic. It was established on the grounds of Vyšehrad Castle. In 1869, it was converted into the national cemetery that is the resting place of notable personalities of Czech art and history. The centerpiece of the cemetery is the Slavín tomb, designed by Antonín Wiehl.

== Location and organisation ==
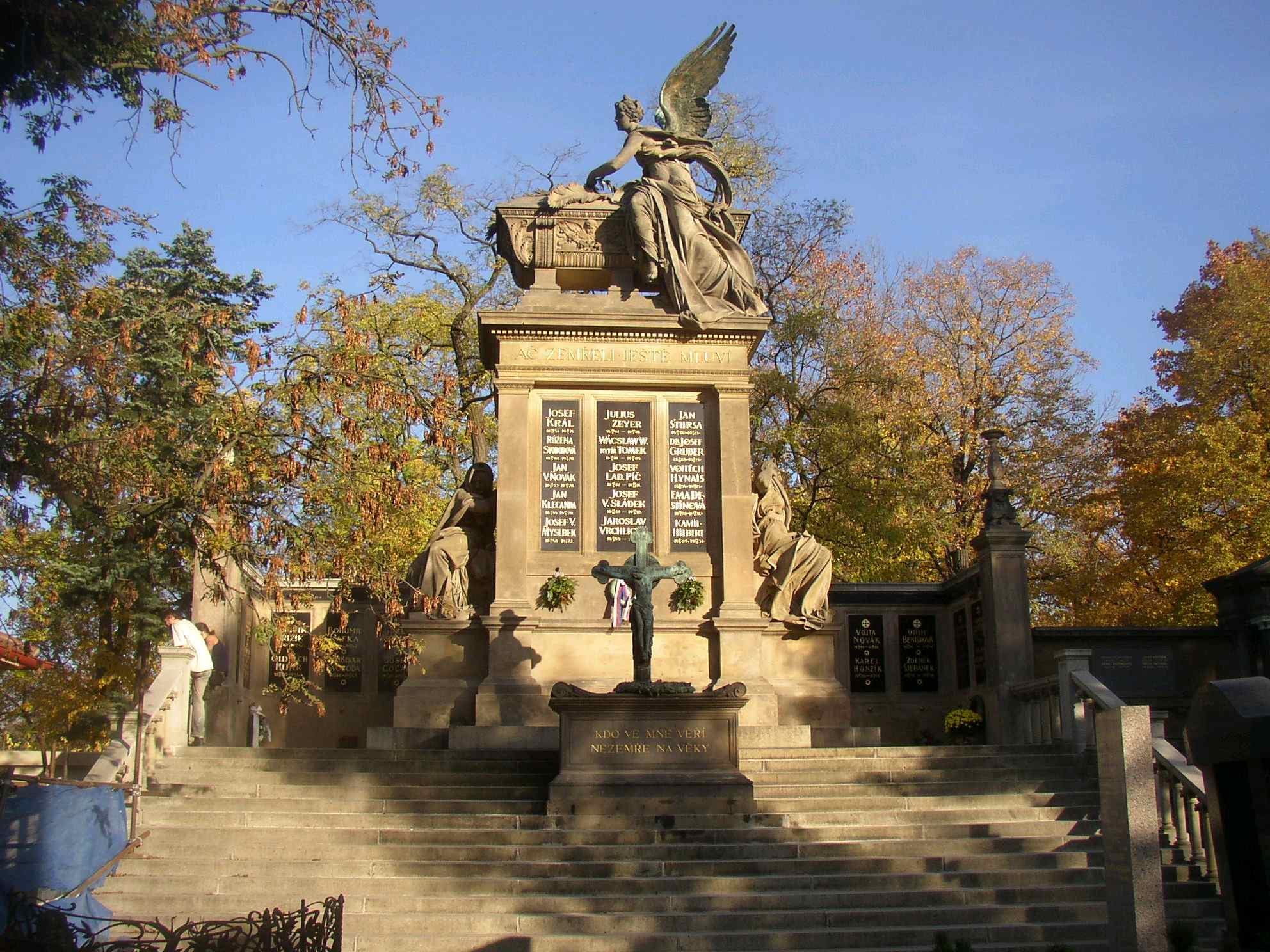
Front view of the Slavín tomb

The Vyšehrad Cemetery has an area of 0.81 ha (2 acres). It is located in the centre of Prague, in the southwestern part of the Prague 2 district. It is located on the grounds of Vyšehrad Castle, which is protected as a national cultural monument.

The Vyšehrad Cemetery contains approximately 1,200 grave sites, several church grave sites closed to the public and more than 100 tombs, 57 of which are arcaded. About 550 notable people is buried there, of which 56 in the Slavín tomb. The Slavín tomb is situated in the eastern part of the cemetery and is the main landmark of the cemetery. There are a large number of artistically valuable tombstones from leading Czech sculptors and architects. A neo-Renaissance arcade is built around most of the cemetery's perimeter.

As of the 2020s, the cemetery's capacity is almost exhausted. Only a few places are available and new cemetery places become available only sporadically. Since 2014, the burial of a personality in the cemetery must be approved by a nine-member commission of the Prague City Hall.

== History ==
According to archaeological findings, burials in the Vyšehrad area began as early as the 11th or 12th century. The oldest mention of the Vyšehrad Cemetery is from 1660, when the construction of the cemetery wall was documented. In the 1860s, the idea of establishing a national cemetery emerged, where important Czech personalities would be buried. In 1862, the Svatobor association was established to support Czech literary figures, and it had the grave of Václav Hanka built in the Vyšehrad Cemetery in 1863. The official transformation of the Vyšehrad Cemetery into the national cemetery took place in 1869. The cemetery began to take on its current form in 1875, when architect Antonín Barvitius proposed a new concept for a cemetery with arcades. The arcade was built in 1881 by architect Antonín Wiehl. In 1889–1893, the Slavín tomb was built according to the design of Antonín Wiehl, which was intended for the most important figures in Czech history.

== Notable interments ==
Notable people buried at Vyšehrad Cemetery include:

=== Politics ===
- Oldřich Černík (1921–1994), politician
- Karel Domin (1882–1953), botanist and politician
- Josef Kaizl (1854–1901), politician and economist
- Otakar Motejl (1932–2010), politician and lawyer
- František Ladislav Rieger (1818–1903), politician
- Alois Pravoslav Trojan (1815–1893), politician and lawyer
- Petr Zenkl (1884–1975), politician

=== Science and academia ===
- Otokar Feistmantel (1848–1891), geologist and paleontologist
- Václav Hanka (1791–1861), philologist
- Jaroslav Heyrovský (1890–1967), chemist and inventor
- Josef Jireček (1825–1888), ethnographer and literary historian
- Jan Krejčí (1825–1887), geologist
- František Křižík (1847–1941), engineer and inventor
- Jakob Philipp Kulik (1793–1863), Austrian mathematician
- Oto Mádr (1917–2011), theologian
- Zdeněk Nejedlý (1878–1962), musicologist and historian
- Josef Ladislav Píč (1847–1911), archaeologist and paleontologist
- Carl Borivoj Presl (1794–1852), botanist
- Jan Svatopluk Presl (1791–1849), natural scientist
- Jan Evangelista Purkyně (1787–1869), anatomist and physiologist
- Ladislav Rieger (1916–1963), mathematician
- Jan Rypka (1886–1968), orientalist and translator
- Jaromír Šámal (1900–1942), entomologist
- Josef Srb-Debrnov (1836–1904), music historian and writer
- Miloslav Stingl (1930–2020), ethnologist, traveller and writer
- Josef Vavroušek (1944–1995), environmentalist and scientist

=== Arts ===
==== Language arts ====
- Eduard Bass (1888–1946), writer and journalist
- Zdenka Bergrová (1923–2008), poet and translator
- Josefina Brdlíková (1843–1910), translator, singer and composer
- Emil František Burian (1904–1959), poet, composer and librettist
- Karel Čapek (1890–1938), writer and playwright
- Svatopluk Čech (1846–1908), writer, journalist and poet
- Marie Červinková-Riegrová (1854–1895), writer
- František Doucha (1810–1884), translator and writer
- Josef Václav Frič (1829 –1890), poet, writer and journalist
- Stanislav Gross (1969–2015), politician and lawyer
- Vítězslav Hálek (1835–1874), poet and writer
- Adolf Heyduk (1835–1923), poet and writer
- Jaroslav Hilbert (1871–1936), dramatist and writer
- Josef Hora (1891–1945), poet and translator
- Jindřich Hořejší (1886–1941), poet and translator
- Anna Hostomská (1907–1995), radio editor, writer and translator
- František Hrubín (1910–1971), poet and writer
- Boleslav Jablonský (1813–1881), poet
- Josef Kainar (1917–1971), poet, songwriter and playwright
- Václav Kaplický (1895–1982), writer, journalist and poet
- František Langer (1888–1965), playwright and writer
- Karel Hynek Mácha (1810–1836), poet
- Jelena Mašínová (1941–2024), screenwriter
- Jiří Mucha (1915–1991), writer, screenwriter and translator
- Václav Bolemír Nebeský (1818–1882), poet
- Vladimír Neff (1909–1983), writer and translator
- Božena Němcová (1820–1862), writer
- Jan Neruda (1834–1891), poet and writer
- Vítězslav Nezval (1900–1958), poet, writer and translator
- Ferdinand Peroutka (1895–1978), journalist and writer
- Gabriela Preissová (1862–1946), writer and playwright
- Marie Pujmanová (1893–1958), poet and writer
- Ladislav Quis (1846–1913), poet, writer and translator
- Josef Václav Sládek (1845–1912), poet, journalist and translator
- Růžena Svobodová (1868–1920), writer
- Karel Teige (1900–1951), writer, journalist and graphic designer
- Karel Toman (1877–1946), poet
- Václav Beneš Třebízský (1849–1884), writer
- Jaroslav Vrchlický (1853–1912), poet
- Vilém Závada (1905–1982), poet, translator and journalist
- Julius Zeyer (1841–1901), writer, poet and playwright

==== Performing arts ====
- Jiří Adamíra (1926–1993), actor
- Karel Ančerl (1908–1973), conductor and composer
- Jiří Bělohlávek (1946–2017), conductor
- Beno Blachut (1913–1985), opera singer
- Ladislav Boháč (1907–1978), actor
- František Brož (1896–1962), violist, composer and conductor
- Terezie Brzková (1932–2012), actor
- Radoslav Brzobohatý (1932–2012), actor
- Vlasta Burian (1891–1962), actor, comedian and singer
- Zdeněk Chalabala (1899–1962), conductor
- Emmy Destinn (1878–1930), opera singer
- Rudolf Deyl Jr. (1912–1967), actor
- Zdeněk Dítě (1920–2001), actor
- Václav Dobiáš (1909–1978), composer
- Antonín Dvořák (1841–1904), composer
- Petr Eben (1929–2007), composer and organist
- Vlasta Fabianová (1912–1991), actress
- Zdeněk Fibich (1850–1900), composer
- Betty Fibichová (1846–1901), opera singer
- Zdeněk Folprecht (1900–1961), composer and conductor
- Marie Glázrová (1911–2000), actress
- Nataša Gollová (1912–1988), actress
- Eduard Haken (1910–1996), opera singer
- Vlastimil Harapes (1946–2024), dancer and choreographer
- Emil Hlobil (1901–1987), composer
- Karel Hoffmann (1872–1936), violinist
- Karel Höger (1909–1977), actor
- Ilja Hurník (1922–2013), composer, pianist and writer
- Ivan Jandl (1937–1987), actor
- Zita Kabátová (1913–2012), actress
- Elmar Klos (1910–1993), film director
- Přemysl Kočí (1917–2003), opera singer and actor
- Jaroslav Kocian (1883–1950), violinist and composer
- Eduard Kohout (1889–1976), actor
- Jaroslav Křička (1882–1969), composer and conductor
- Adolf Krössing (1848–1933), opera singer and stage director
- Jan Kubelík (1880–1940), violinist and composer
- Rafael Kubelík (1914–1996), conductor and composer
- Richard Kubla (1890–1964), opera singer
- Vilém Kurz (1872–1945), pianist and piano teacher
- Ferdinand Laub (1832–1875), violinist and composer
- Otakar Mařák (1872–1939), opera singer
- Jaroslav Marvan (1901–1974), actor
- Waldemar Matuška (1932–2009), singer
- František Maxián (1907–1971), pianist
- Jiří Menzel (1938–2020), film director, stage director and actor
- Ladislav Mráz (1923–1962), opera singer
- Zuzana Navarová (1959–2004), singer and songwriter
- Oskar Nedbal (1874–1930), violist, composer and conductor
- František Ondříček (1857–1922), violinist and composer
- Otakar Ostrčil (1879–1935), composer and conductor
- Zdeněk Otava (1902–1980), opera singer
- Ladislav Pešek (1906–1986), actor
- Eliška Pešková (1833–1895), actress and playwright
- Jiřina Petrovická (1923–2008), actress
- Ludvík Podéšť (1921–1968), composer and conductor
- Marie Podvalová (1909–1992), opera singer
- Zdenka Procházková (1926–2021), actress
- Jaroslav Průcha (1898–1963), actor
- Čestmír Řanda (1923–1986), actor
- Vladimír Ráž (1923–2000), actor
- Jana Rybářová (1936–1957), actress
- Olga Scheinpflugová (1902–1968), actress and author
- Josef Slavík (1806–1833), violinist
- Vladimír Šmeral (1903–1982), actor
- Václav Smetáček (1906–1986), conductor, composer and oboist
- Bedřich Smetana (1824–1884), composer
- Pavel Štěpán (1925–1998), pianist
- Zdeněk Štěpánek (1896–1968), actor
- Ilona Štěpánová-Kurzová (1899–1975), pianist and piano teacher
- Jiřina Štěpničková (1912–1985), actress
- Karel Strakatý (1804–1868), opera singer
- Josef Suk (1929–2011), violinist and violist
- Otilie Suková (1878–1905), pianist and composer
- Karel Vlach (1911–1986), conductor and music arranger
- Václav Vorlíček (1930–2019), film director
- Ladislav Vycpálek (1882–1969), composer and violist
- Václav Vydra (1876–1953), actor
- Bedřich Antonín Wiedermann (1883–1951), organist and composer
- Hana Zagorová (1946–2022), singer and actress
- Bohuš Záhorský (1906–1980), actor
- Ivo Žídek (1926–2003), opera singer
- Václav Zítek (1932–2011), opera singer

==== Visual arts ====
- Mikoláš Aleš (1852–1913), painter
- Břetislav Benda (1897–1983), sculptor
- Vincenc Beneš (1883–1979), painter
- Zdenka Braunerová (1858–1934), painter and illustrator
- František Čermák (1822–1884), painter
- Antonín Chittussi (1847–1891), painter
- Josef Drahoňovský (1877–1938), sculptor
- Jaroslav Fragner (1898–1967), architect
- Josef Gočár (1880–1945), architect
- Vojtěch Hynais (1854–1925), painter and designer
- Bohumil Kafka (1878–1942), sculptor
- Jan Kaplický (1937–2009), architect
- Adolf Kašpar (1877–1934), painter and illustrator
- Václav Levý (1820–1870), sculptor
- Adolf Liebscher (1857–1919), painter
- Cyprián Majerník (1909–1945), Slovak painter
- Julius Mařák (1832–1899), painter and graphic designer
- Josefina Mařáková (1872–1907), painter
- Zdeněk Miler (1921-2011), illustrator and animator
- Josef Mocker (1835–1899), architect and restorer
- Alphonse Mucha (1860–1939), painter and illustrator
- František Muzika (1900–1974), painter and illustrator
- Josef Václav Myslbek (1848–1922), sculptor
- Radek Pilař (1931–1993), illustrator and animator
- Karel Purkyně (1834–1868), painter
- Vlastimil Rada (1895–1962), painter and illustrator
- Ladislav Šaloun (1870–1946), sculptor
- Kája Saudek (1935–2015), illustrator and graphic artist
- Josef Schulz (1840–1917), architect and designer
- František Sequens (1836–1896), painter
- Václav Špála (1885–1946), painter and graphic designer
- Otakar Španiel (1881–1955), sculptor and engraver
- Helena Šrámková (1883–1974), painter
- Jan Štursa (1880–1925), sculptor
- Stanislav Sucharda (1866–1916), sculptor
- Karel Svolinský (1896–1986), painter and graphic artist
- Max Švabinský (1873–1962), painter
- Antonín Wiehl (1846–1910), architect
- Adolf Zábranský (1909–1981), illustrator and painter
- Helena Zmatlíková (1923–2005), illustrator

=== Other ===
- Josef Bican (1913–2001), footballer
- Vlasta Koseová (1895–1973), activist and pioneer of Scouting
- Hana Mašková (1949–1972), figure skater
- Josef Masopust (1931–2015), football player and coach
- Jan Otto (1841–1916), publisher and bookseller
- Antonín Benjamin Svojsík (1876–1938), pedagogue and pioneer of Scouting
