= Kazimierz Andrzej Jaworski =

- Born: November 28, 1897
- Died: September 6, 1973 (aged 75)
- Other name: KAJ

Kazimierz Andrzej Jaworski (28 November 1897 – 6 September 1973) was a Polish philologist, teacher, poet, translator and publisher. He used the pseudonym KAJ. He was born in Siedliszcze. His parents were Edward Jaworski and Maria Jaworska née Smoleńska. He lived in Chełm. During World War I he was deported to Kharkiv, where he started studying medicine in the years 1917–1918. After he had come back to Poland, he studied Polish philology at Catholic University of Lublin (today John Paul II Catholic University of Lublin and at University of Warsaw. In interwar Poland, he was the founder and editor of an important literary magazine, Kamena. In 1924 he published his first book named Czerwonej i białej kochance (To a red and white mistress). During World War II, he taught underground classes, was eventually arrested and imprisoned in the Sachsenhausen concentration camp. After the war he translated many works from Russian language, and became the editor of the reestablished Kamena magazine. He also translated from Czech and Slovak. Among his translations is the poem Edison by Vítězslav Nezval. In the years 1971-1974 Wydawnictwo Lubelskie published Jaworski's Pisma (Collected Works) in twelve volumes.

== Bibliography ==
- Waldemar Michalski, Kazimierz Andrzej Jaworski. Poeta – tłumacz – redaktor (1897-1973). Z wyborem wierszy i tłumaczeń. TAWA, Lublin 2014.
- Kazimierz Prus, Kazimierz Andrzej Jaworski - tłumacz-wydawca i popularyzator literatury rosyjskiej, Wyższa Szkoła Pedagogiczna, Słupsk 1981.
