= Ladislav Rieger =

Czech mathematician (1916–1963)

Ladislav Svante Rieger
- Born: 25 June 1916; Malmö, Sweden
- Died: 14 February 1963 (aged 46); Prague, Czechoslovakia
- Occupation: Mathematician

Ladislav Svante Rieger (25 June 1916 – 14 February 1963) was a Czech mathematician. He worked in the areas of algebra, mathematical logic and axiomatic set theory. He is considered to be the founder of mathematical logic in Czechoslovakia, having begun his work around 1957.

== Life ==
Ladislav Rieger was born on 25 June 1916 in Malmö, Sweden. His father, Ladislav Rieger Sr., was a philosopher and university professor at Charles University. He attended a secondary school in Žilina and graduated in Prague. He then studied mathematics at the Faculty of Science, Charles University and completed his studies, interrupted by the war, in 1945. Until 1958, he worked at the Czech Technical University in Prague. From 1958 until his death, he worked at the Institute of Mathematics of the Czechoslovak Academy of Sciences. He died in Prague on 14 February 1963. He is buried at Vyšehrad Cemetery.
