= Biskoupky =

- Municipality
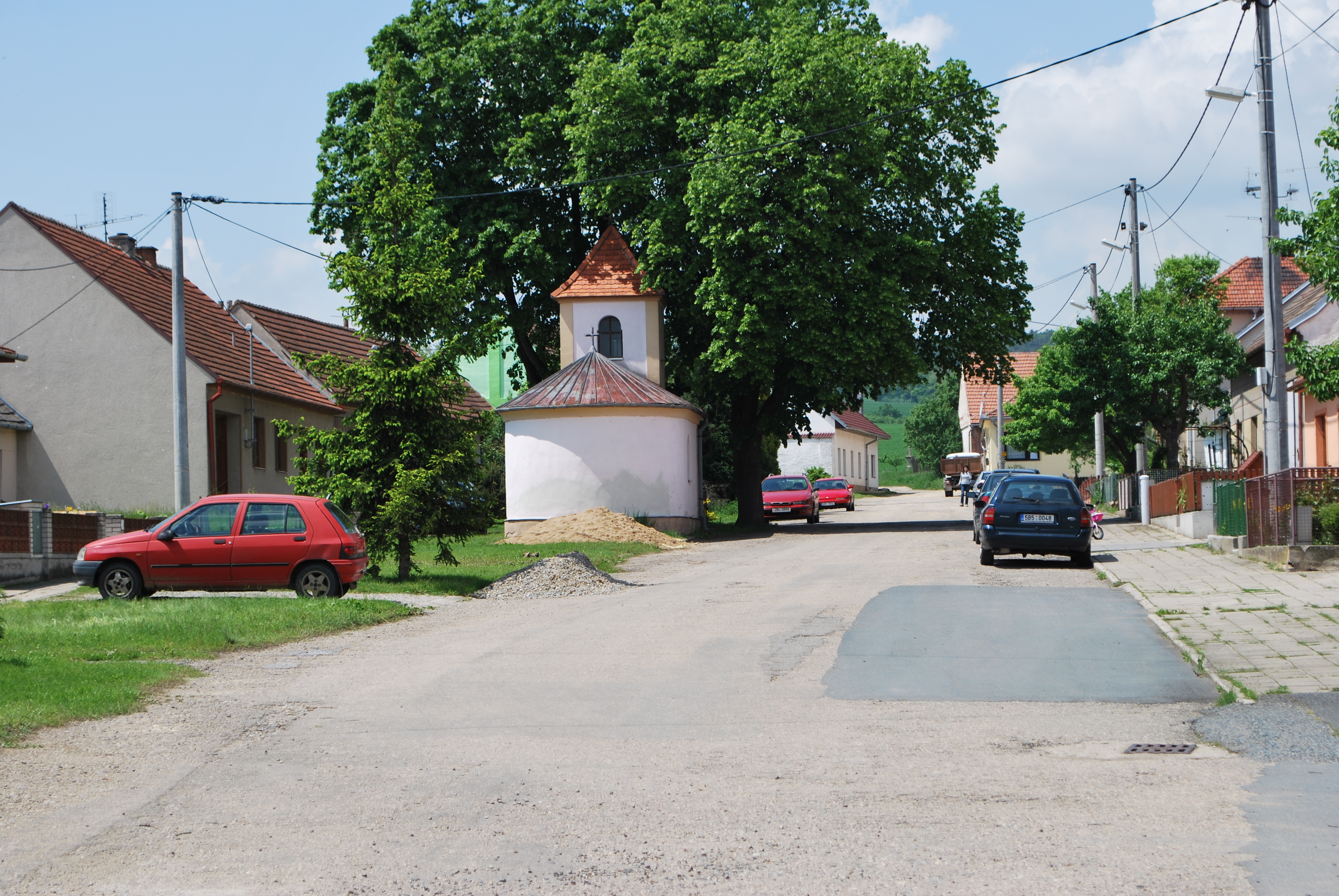
- Centre of Biskoupky

- Coat of arms

- Location in the Czech Republic
- Coordinates: 49°5′52″N 16°16′53″E
- Country: Czech Republic
- Region: South Moravian
- District: Brno-Country
- First mentioned: 1131

Area
  - Total: 5.83 km^{2} (2.25 sq mi)
- Elevation: 270 m (890 ft)

Population (2026-01-01)
  - Total: 182
  - Density: 31.2/km^{2} (80.9/sq mi)
- Time zone: UTC+1 (CET)
  - Summer (DST): UTC+2 (CEST)
- Postal code: 664 13
- Website: www.biskoupky.cz

Biskoupky is a municipality and village in Brno-Country District in the South Moravian Region of the Czech Republic. It has about 200 inhabitants.

== Geography ==
Biskoupky is located about 25 kilometres (16 mi) southwest of Brno. It lies on the border between the Boskovice Furrow and Jevišovice Uplands. The highest point is the hill Biskoupský kopec at 397 m (1,302 ft) above sea level. The municipality is situated on the left bank of the Jihlava River.

== History ==
The first written mention of Biskoupky is from 1131.

== Demographics ==
Historical population
| Year | Pop. | ±% |
|---|---|---|
| 1869 | 203 | — |
| 1880 | 206 | +1.5% |
| 1890 | 250 | +21.4% |
| 1900 | 252 | +0.8% |
| 1910 | 247 | −2.0% |
| 1921 | 265 | +7.3% |
| 1930 | 285 | +7.5% |
| 1950 | 254 | −10.9% |
| 1961 | 272 | +7.1% |
| 1970 | 243 | −10.7% |
| 1980 | 212 | −12.8% |
| 1991 | 196 | −7.5% |
| 2001 | 177 | −9.7% |
| 2011 | 178 | +0.6% |
| 2021 | 179 | +0.6% |
Source: Censuses

== Notable people ==
- Vítězslav Nezval (1900–1958), poet and writer
