= Jaroslav Fragner =

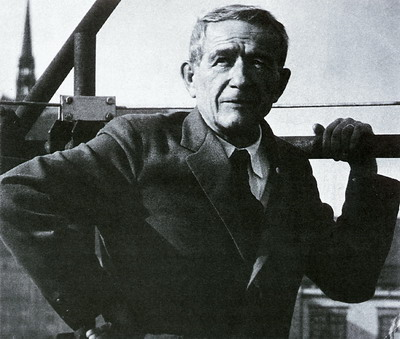
- Fragner in the 1960s
- Born: Jaroslav Fragner; 25 December 1898; Prague, Bohemia, Austria-Hungary
- Died: 3 January 1967 (aged 68); Prague, Czechoslovakia
- Occupation: Architect

Jaroslav Fragner (25 December 1898 – 3 January 1967) was a Czech modernist architect. Fragner was one of the prominent designers of functionalist architecture in the Czech Republic. He contributed to the renovation of Prague Castle and designed several small weekend houses for relatives and friends, including Milča Mayerová. He was a member of the avant garde group Devětsil and later Mánes Union of Fine Arts.

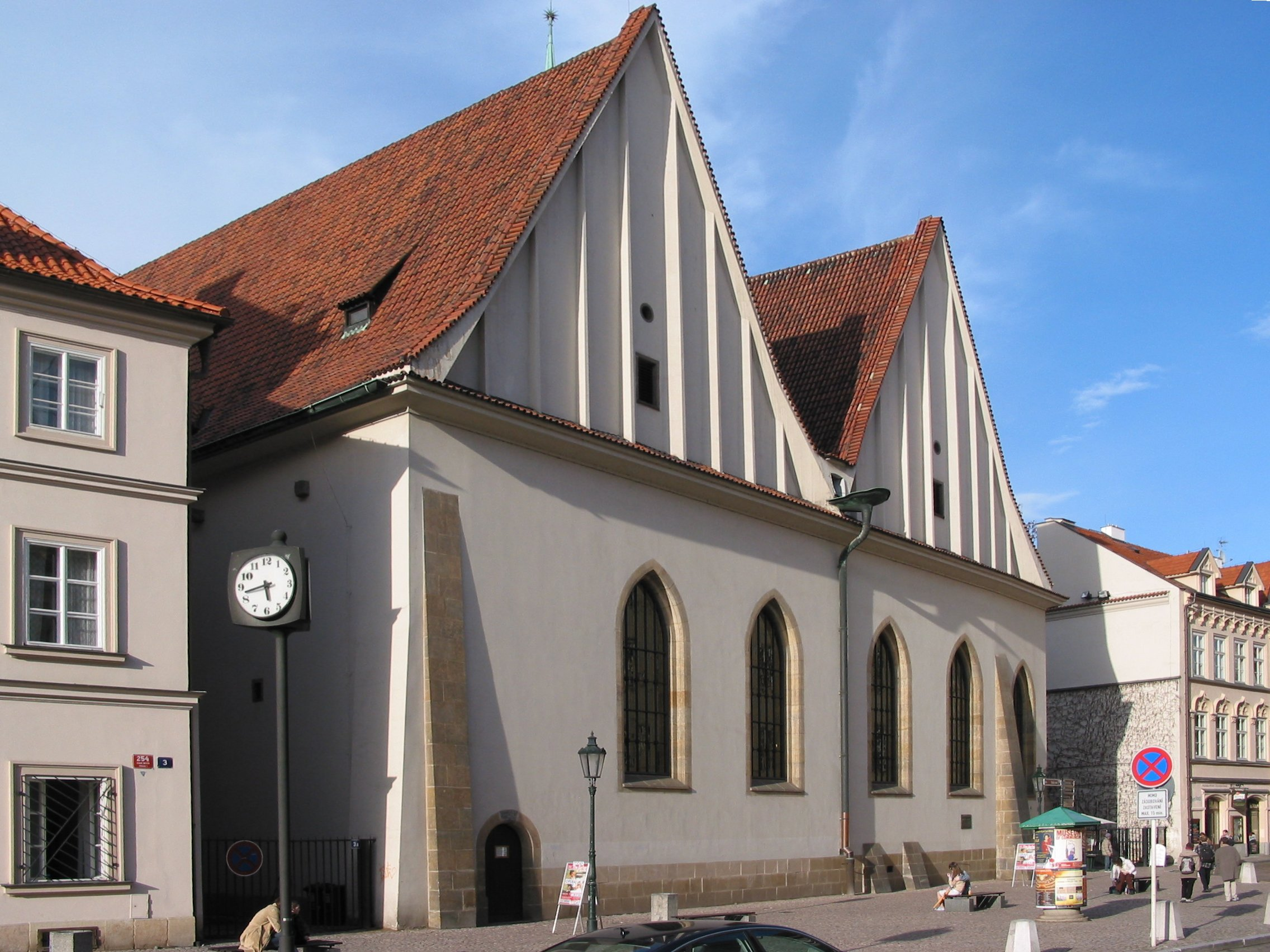
Bethlehem Chapel after Fragners' reconstruction 1947–1967

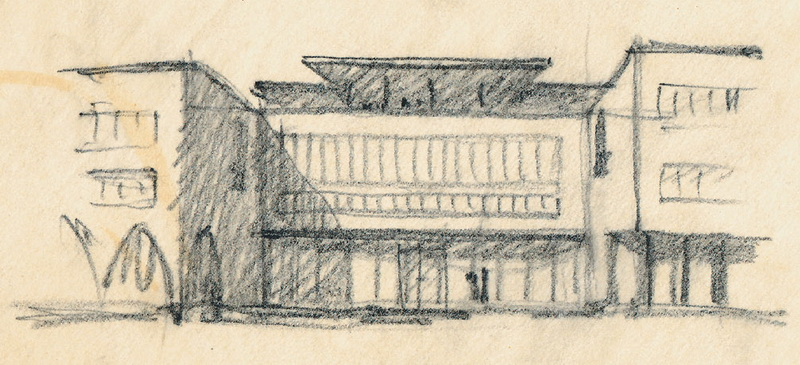
Karolinum, Fragner's study, c. 1946–1950

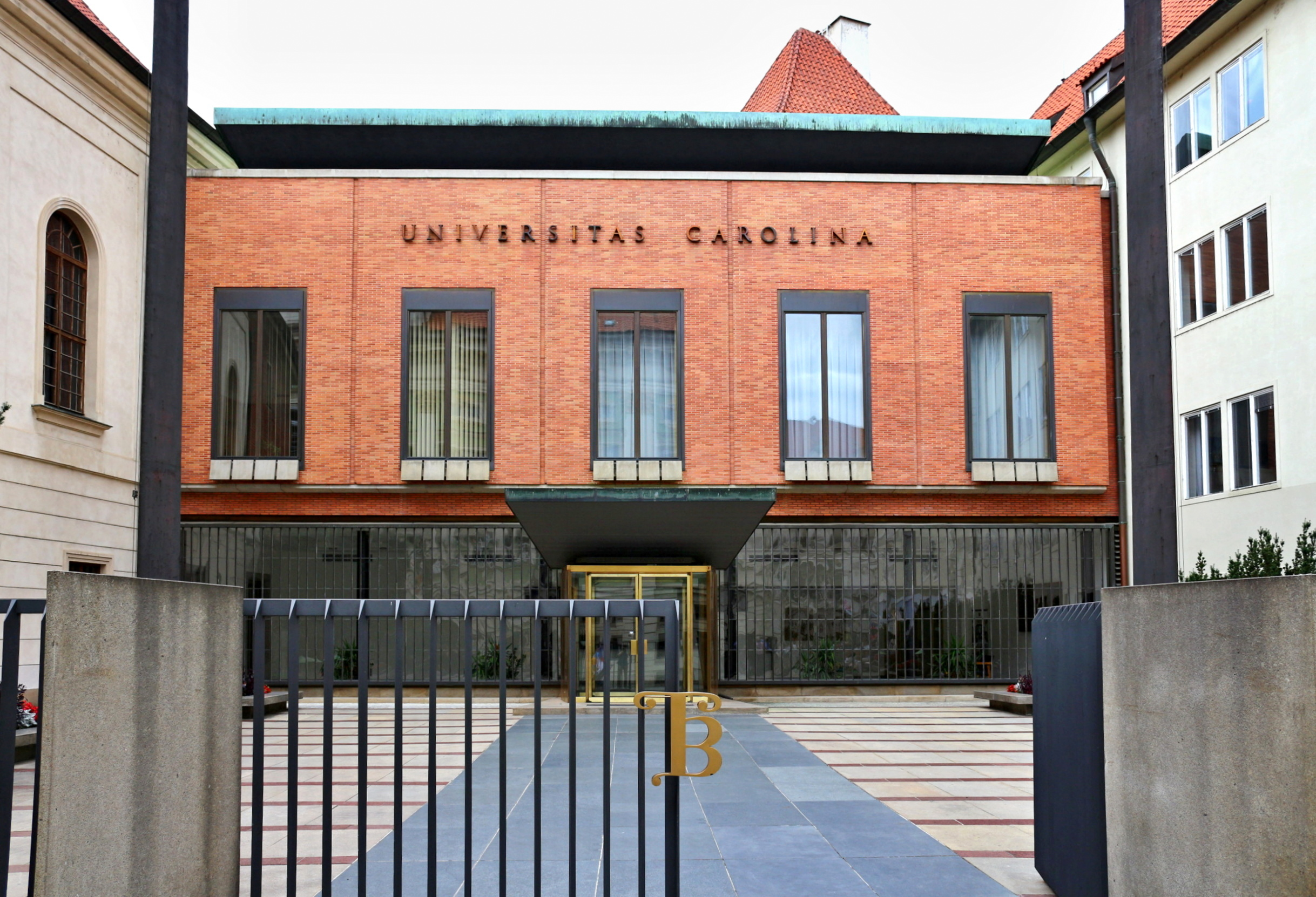
Karolinum today
