= Edison (poem) =

Poem by Czech poet Vítězslav Nezval, written in 1927

Edison is an epic poem by Czech poet Vítězslav Nezval. It was written in 1927. Later it was included in the poetic book Básně noci (Poems of the Night) which was published in 1930. The main hero of the poem is American inventor Thomas Alva Edison, considered by the author to be a modern genius. Nezval's work is a praise of human activity, technology, and science, but also an expression of anxiety about civilisation. Nezval compares the inventor's work to writing poetry. He points out that every creative work demands much toil and courage. After Edison's death in 1931 Nezval wrote Signál času (Signal of time) which is an elegy. Both poems are written in the same measure, trochaic hexameter. Nezval uses long enumerations, building sophisticated poetical imagery. Nezval's Edison was probably influenced by Guillaume Apollinaire's work, especially the poem Zone, which was translated into Czech by Karel Čapek.

== Translations ==
The poem was translated into English by Ewald Osers. François Kérel, helped by Nezval himself, translated the poem into French. It was also twice translated into Polish, by Kazimierz Andrzej Jaworski and Józef Waczków.

== Bibliography ==
- Vítězslav Nezval, Edison. Báseň o pěti zpěvech. Translated from the Czech by Ewald Osers (parallel Czech and English texts), Dvořák, Pelhřimov 2003.
- Vítězslav Nezval, Cudowny czarodziej. Wybór i wstęp Jacek Baluch, redakcja Andrzej Piotrowski, Państwowy Instytut Wydawniczy, Warszawa 1969 (in Polish).
