= Vilém Závada =

Czech Poet and translator

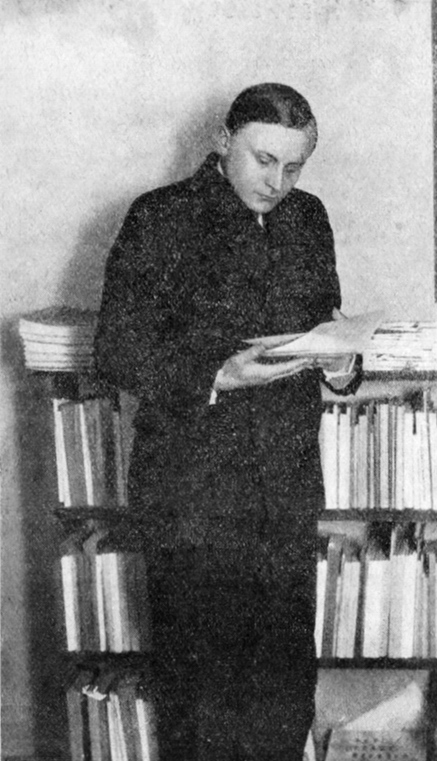
- Závada in 1930
- Born: Vilém František Závada; 2 May 1905; Ostrava, Austria-Hungary
- Died: 30 September 1982 (aged 77); Prague, Czechoslovakia
- Resting place: Vyšehrad Cemetery
- Education: Faculty of Arts of the Charles University
- Occupations: Poet, translator
- Writing career
- Notable works: Panychida; Na prahu
- Notable awards: National Artist of Czechoslovakia

Vilém Závada (2 May 1905 – 30 November 1982) was a Czech poet, translator and journalist.

== Biography ==
Závada was born in to the family of a metal worker, his father died during the First World War, an event which left a huge impression on his future works. His mother raised Vilém and his two brothers in impoverished circumstances. Závada graduated with his doctorate in philosophy from Charles University and started his literary career.

Initially a representative of Poetism, he broke with the literary style in favor of a more gloomy and pessimistic romanticism. In 1927 Závada wrote his most famous work, Panychida, a work which was for the commemoration of the fallen of the First World War as well as a melancholic meditation on life itself.

In the 30s Závada mostly worked as a magazine editor. After the invasion of Czechoslovakia by Nazi Germany, he became more reclusive and wrote Hradní věž, which was about his coming to terms with the fate of his country.

After the German surrender Závada joined the Communist Party of Czechoslovakia however was not involved in party politics. After a period of simplistic acceptance of the optimism of post-war conditions, at the end of his life he returned to the poetry of existential depth and tragedy of life.

In 1948 he was appointed the director of the National Library of Czechoslovakia, a position from which he resigned in 1949. In 1958 he was again temporarily appointed head of the library.

in 1966 he was awarded the position of National Artist. In 1969, he was awarded in the anniversary of the 100th anniversary of Otokar Březina's birthday.

Závada died in 1982 in Prague at the age of 77 and was buried at the Vyšehrad Cemetery.

His son Jan Závada (1933–2024) was a Czech molecular oncologist, expert in virus genetics.
