= Jindřich Hořejší =

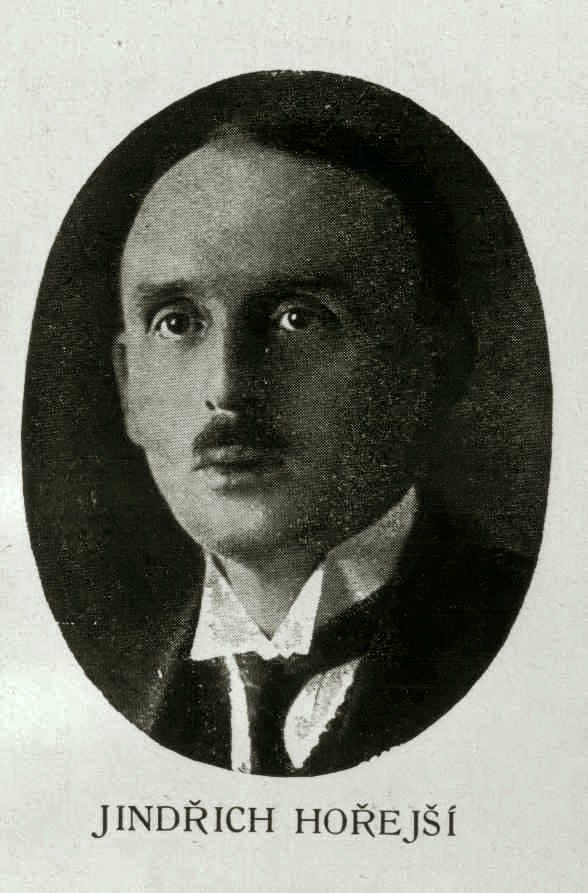

Jindřich Hořejší (25 April 1886 – 30 May 1941) was a Czech poet and translator.

== Biography ==
Hořejší was born in to a working-class family. In 1904, after he graduated from secondary school, he published his poems in the school's alumni almanac. He began studying at the Czech Technical University in Prague for one year. In June 1905, he left the university and went on foot to Paris. He earned living by doing odd jobs and contributing to a number of magazines. He studied philosophy, French language and literature at the Sorbonne in Paris and economics in Dijon, where he received his diploma in 1909. With the beginning of World War I, Hořejší burned all of his written works and enlisted in the army, where he then fought on the Russian front.

After 1918, he worked as a clerk in the Ministry of Public Supply, and from 1922 until the end of his life he was a contracted translator into French at the State Statistical Office in Prague. During the 1920s, Hořejší was a member of the group Devětsil and primarily wrote in the style of Proletarian poetry.

Hořejší also worked as a translator of plays for multiple theatres. Towards the end of his life, he fell ill with lung disease. Hořejší died is buried in Vyšehrad Cemetery.

== Works ==
- Hudba na náměstí – (1921)
- Korálový náhrdelník – (1923)
- Den a noc – (1931)

=== Translations ===
From French, Hořejší translated works by Guillaume Apollinaire, Jehan Rictus, and Tristan Corbière, as well as other prose and dramatic works. He translated the novel The Good Soldier Švejk by Jaroslav Hašek into French.
