= Jakob Philipp Kulik =

Austrian mathematician

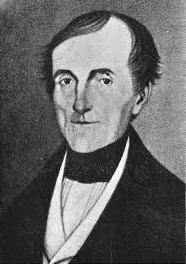
Jakob Philipp Kulik

Jakob Philipp Kulik (Czech: Jakub Filip Kulik; 20 April 1793 – 28 February 1863) was an Austrian mathematician known for his construction of a massive factor tables.

== Biography ==
Kulik was born in Lemberg, Austrian Empire (today Lviv in Ukraine). He studied there philosophy and law. In 1814–1816, he worked as a teacher of mathematics at a gymnasium in Olomouc, but then he went to Graz and taught physics at the University of Graz. In 1826, Kulik became a professor of mathematics at Charles University in Prague. He died on 28 February 1863 in Prague. Kulik is buried at Vyšehrad Cemetery in Prague.

== Kulik's factor tables ==
In 1825, Kulik mentioned a table of factors up to 30 million, but this table does no longer seem to exist. It is also not clear if it had really been completed.

From about 1825 until 1863 Kulik produced a factor table of numbers up to 100330200 (except for numbers divisible by 2, 3, or 5). This table basically had the same format as the table to 30 million and it is therefore most likely that the work on the "Magnus canon divisorum" spanned from the mid-1820s to Kulik's death, at which time the tables were still unfinished. These tables fill eight volumes totaling 4212 pages, and are kept in the archives of the Vienna Academy of Sciences. Volume II of the 8-volume set has been lost.

== Works ==
- Jakob Philipp Kulik: De phaenomenis iridis, 1822
- Jakob Philipp Kulik: Handbuch mathematischer Tafeln, 1824
- Jakob Philipp Kulik: Divisores numerorum decies centena millia non excedentium, 1825
- Jakob Philipp Kulik: Lehrbuch der höheren Analysis, 1831
- Jakob Philipp Kulik: Der tausendjährige Kalender, 1831
- Jakob Philipp Kulik: Theorie und Tafeln der Kettenlinie, 1832
- Jakob Philipp Kulik: Sammlung von Tafeln zur Erleichterung des Studiums der Mathematik, und mit Rücksicht ihrer Anwendbarkeit auf Zwecke des praktischen Lebens, 1833
- Jakob Philipp Kulik: Der tausendjährige Kalender, 1834 (2nd edition)
- Jakob Philipp Kulik: Biographie des Martin Alois David, 1837
- Jakob Philipp Kulik: Untersuchungen über die Kettenbrückenlinie, 1838
- Jakob Philipp Kulik: Tafeln der Quadrat- und Kubikzahlen, 1848
- Jakob Philipp Kulik: Neue Multiplikationstafeln, 1851
- Jakob Philipp Kulik: Tafeln der hyperbolischen Sektoren und der Längen elliptischer Bögen und Quadranten, 1851
- Jakob Philipp Kulik: Über die Tafel primitiver Wurzeln, 1853
- Jakob Philipp Kulik: Beiträge zur Auflösung höherer Gleichungen überhaupt und der kubischen Gleichungen insbesondere, 1860
- Jakob Philipp Kulik: Magnus Canon Divisorum, c. 1825–1863
