= Toyen =

Czech painter (1902–1980)

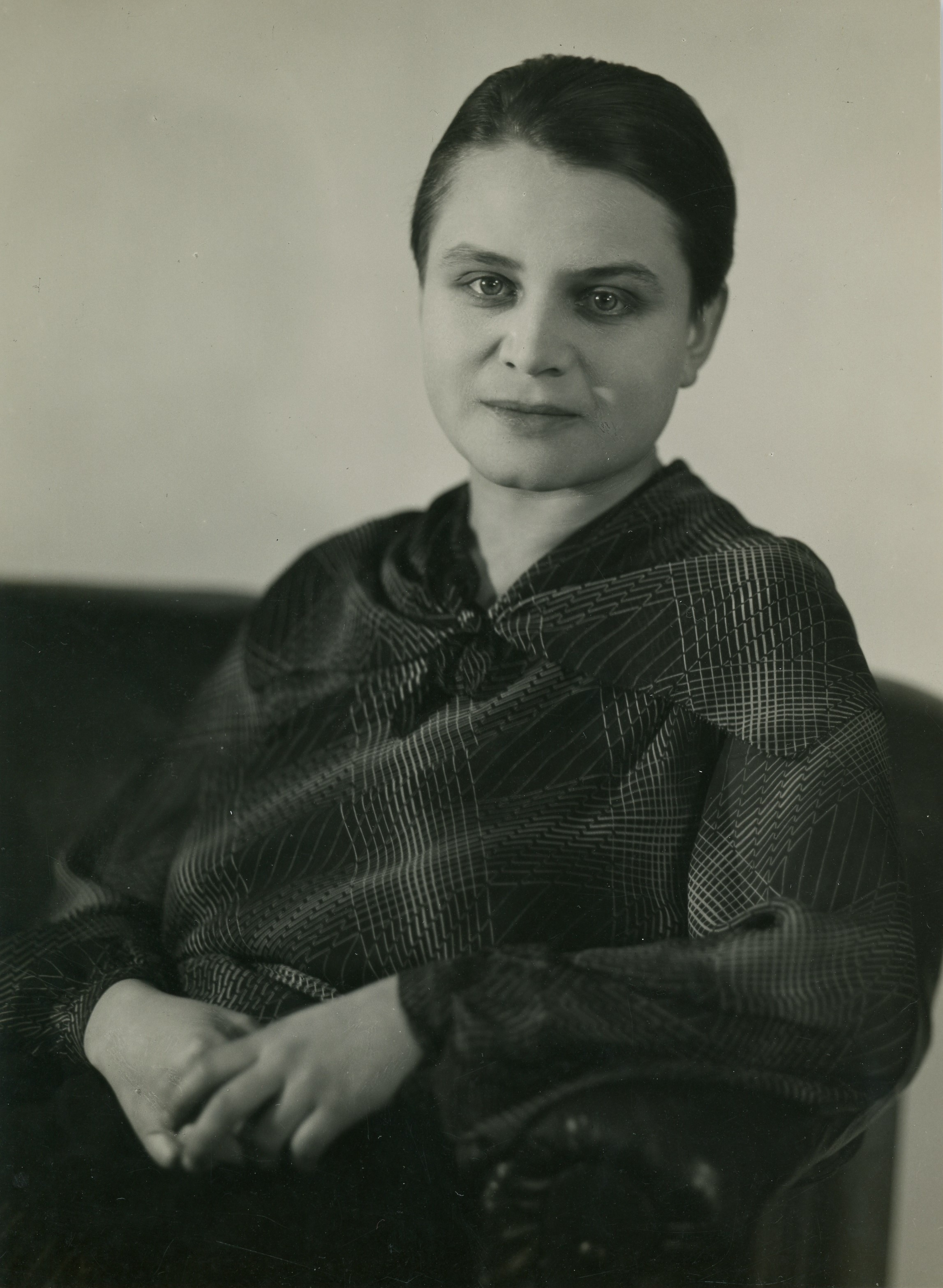
- Toyen in 1930
- Born: Marie Čermínová; 21 September 1902; Prague, Austria-Hungary
- Died: 9 November 1980 (aged 78); Paris, France
- Resting place: Batignolles Cemetery, Paris, France
- Education: Academy of Arts, Architecture and Design in Prague
- Occupations: Painting; photographer; illustrator; draughtswoman
- Partner: Jindřich Štyrský

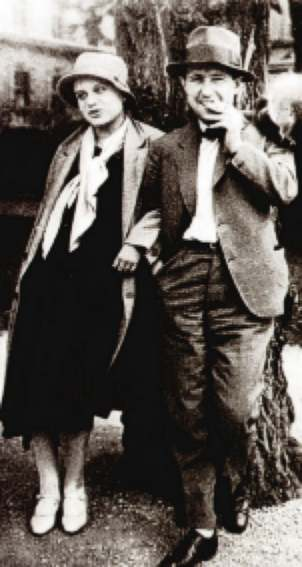
Toyen with Karel Teige in 1925

Toyen (born Marie Čermínová; 21 September 1902 – 9 November 1980) was a Czech painter, drafter, and illustrator and a member of the surrealist movement.

In 1923, the artist adopted the professional pseudonym Toyen. The name Toyen has been suggested to be derived from the French word 'citoyen,' meaning citizen, but it has also been proposed to be a play on the Czech expression ‘to je on’ (‘it is he’). Toyen favored this gender-neutral mononym (in Czech the family name is gendered, with women's names ending in "ová") and would speak the language in the masculine singular form. Vítězslav Nezval wrote that Toyen "refused... to use the feminine endings" when speaking in the first person.

== Biography ==
Toyen left her family home at sixteen, and it has been speculated it was due to sympathy towards anarchism.

In the early 1920s, Toyen resided in Smichov with her older sister, Zdena Svobodova, whose husband worked for the railroad. Though the artist presented themself as a lone wolf, family was located nearby and they could visit with their mother whenever they wished, though visits were scarce. In 1940, Toyen and their sister each inherited split custody of their mother’s home until Zdena’s death in 1945, then the property became divided between Toyen and the widower.

From 1919 to 1920, Toyen attended UMPRUM (Academy of Arts, Architecture and Design) in Prague to study the decorative arts. They worked closely with fellow Surrealist poet and artist Jindřich Štyrský until Štyrský's death.

Toyen joined the Czech avant-garde Devětsil group in 1923 and exhibited with them. The group had strong international connections, especially but not only to French culture. Some of the other members of this very large group included: artist and writer Jindřich Štyrský, future Nobel prizewinning poet Jaroslav Seifert, the constructivist architectural theorist Karel Teige, and the poet František Halas. In the early 1920s Toyen traveled to Paris, and soon returned there with Štyrský to live. While living in Paris, the two founded an artistic alternative to Abstraction and Surrealism, which they dubbed Artificialism. Artificialism was defined by Toyen and Štyrský in a leaflet for an exhibition as "The identification of the painter with the poet," where the artist creates poetry without using language. The two would return to Prague in 1928.

Toyen's sketches, book illustrations, and paintings were frequently erotic. They had an interest in erotic humor, combining themes of both pleasure and pain. Their imagery often featured disembodied female figures as well as parts of male bodies like genitalia. Their book illustrations often featured female faces.

Toyen contributed erotic sketches for Štyrský's Erotická Revue (1930–33). This journal was published on strict subscription terms based on a circulation of 150 copies. Štyrský also published books under the imprint Edice 69, some of which Toyen illustrated. For example, Toyen illustrated the Marquis de Sade's Justine. Also of note, they contributed pieces in Die Frau als Künstlerin, Woman as an Artist, the prestigious 1928 survey of women artists in Western civilization.

Toyen's output of over 500 illustrated books includes, for example, The Purple Land by W. H. Hudson and Charles Vildrac's L'lle rose, both from 1930.

After their associates Vítězslav Nezval and Jindřich Honzl met André Breton in Paris, in March 1934 Toyen and Štyrský joined them in founding the Czech Surrealist Group along with other artists, writers, and the composer Jaroslav Ježek. When the surrealist poets Mary Stanley Low and Juan Breá lived in Prague, they became acquaintances of Toyen and the other Czech surrealists.

Forced underground during the Nazi occupation and Second World War, Toyen sheltered their second artistic partner, Jindřich Heisler, a poet of Jewish descent who had joined the Czech Surrealist Group in 1938. The two permanently relocated to Paris in 1947, before the Communist takeover of Czechoslovakia in 1948, and joined the Parisian Surrealists. In Paris, Toyen worked with André Breton, Benjamin Péret and other surrealists such as Annie Le Brun. Toyen would continue to collaborate with surrealist-affiliated poets and other writers but soon ceased working for commercial publishers in Czechoslovakia.

== Exploring sexuality and gender in surrealism ==
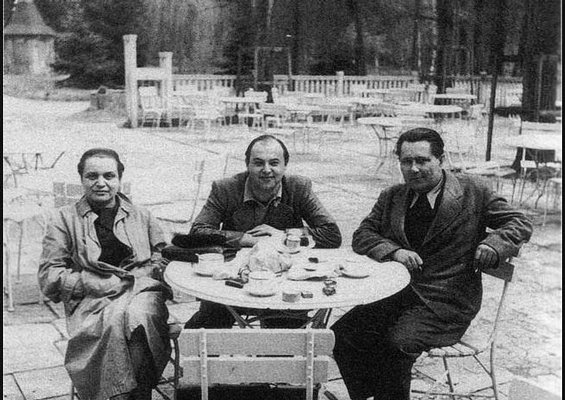
Toyen with Jindřich Heisler and Karel Teige in 1940

Toyen's artistic identity involved significant attention to gender issues and sexual politics. It has been suggested that this would have been difficult considering the surrealist movement was male-dominated and is often regarded as sexist. However, surrealism began to attract many women in the 1930s and became much more gender-balanced as time went by. Breton in particular admired Toyen and the artist was close to both Breton and his third wife, Elisa.

Toyen was assigned female at birth, but appears to have preferred a less-gendered identification. Some people compare Toyen with "other Surrealist women" such as Claude Cahun, Leonora Carrington, and a handful of others. Cahun examined the fluidity of gender roles, which was also true of Toyen. Toyen often dressed in masculine-style clothing and preferred masculine signifiers, choosing a non-conformist position when it came to gender and sexuality, themes heavily mined in Surrealist art. The act of cross-dressing was a tool used by Toyen and woman artists at the time to overcome institutionalized and cultural sexism. By doing so, they embodied the role of the active protagonist, a role reserved traditionally for men. Toyen, along with women of the avant-garde movement such as Natalia Goncharova and Zinaida Gippius called these boundaries to light, then actively transcended them by adopting masculine attributes.

The artist often addressed gender and sexuality in humorous and fantasy-erotic illustrations. Toyen has been theorized by Malynne Sternstein as "hypersexualized."

The surrealists believed that humans are sexual beings, and many surrealists linked sexuality to artistic creativity. Some surrealists deemed sexuality to be central, with genitalia as the center of vitality.

Toyen expressed interest in lesbian sexuality along with many other forms of sexual expression, but it is unknown what the artist's personal sexual activity actually included. Toyen's two major artistic partnerships were with men, but it is not known whether these included sexual contact. According to Huebner, it is best to see Toyen as queer and not attempt to categorize the artist's sexuality or gender.

Toyen has been described as presenting in an "ambiguously gendered" manner due to alternately wearing skirts and more masculine-styled attire. Toyen's contemporaries reported Toyen as walking in an unfeminine way and asserting that they were attracted to women.

== Posthumous recognition ==
Asteroid (4691) Toyen is named in their honor.
