= Vladimír Holan =

Czech poet and translator

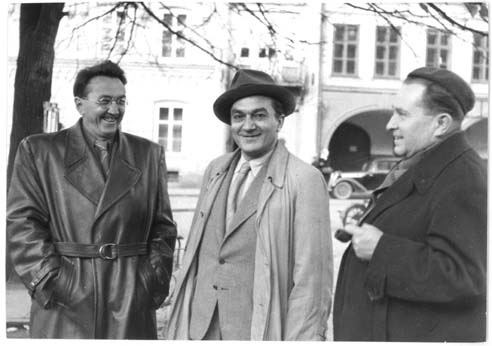
- Vladimír Holan (in the middle)
- Born: 16 September 1905; Prague, Kingdom of Bohemia, Austria-Hungary
- Died: 31 March 1980 (aged 74); Prague, Czechoslovakia
- Occupations: Poet, writer, translator
- Years active: 1926–1977
- Notable work: Triumph of Death; A Night with Hamlet; Panychida

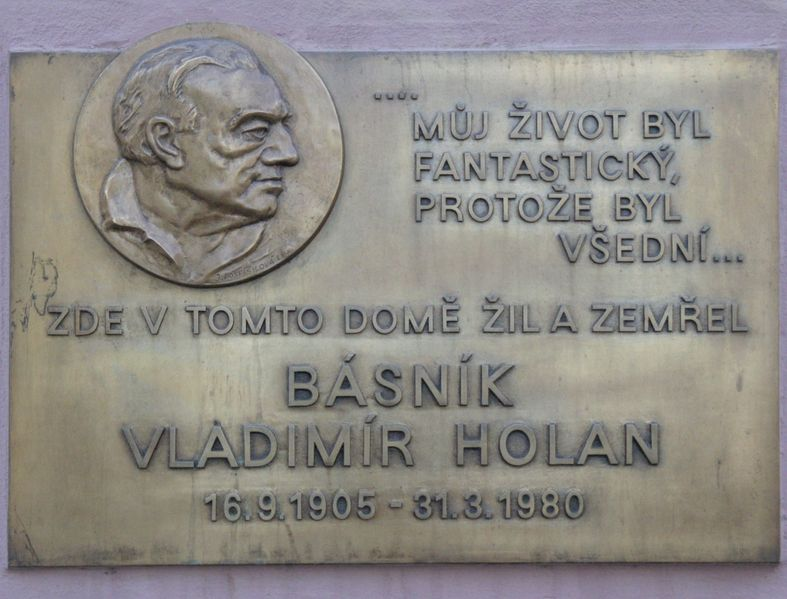
Commemorative plaque on a house U Lužického semináře 18, where Holan spent last years of his life

Vladimír Holan (Czech pronunciation: [ˈvlaɟɪmiːr ˈɦolan]; 16 September 1905 – 31 March 1980) was a Czech poet. He was known for employing obscure language, dark topics and pessimistic views in his poems. He was nominated for the Nobel Prize in the late 1960s.

== Life ==
Holan was born in Prague, but he spent most of his childhood outside the capital. When he moved back in the 1920s he studied law and started a job as a clerk, a position that was a large source of dissatisfaction for the poet. He lost his father and in 1932 married Věra Pilařová. In the same year he published the collection of poems Vanutí (Breezing), which he considered his first piece of poetic art (there were two books preceding it: Blouznivý vějíř /1926/ and Triumf smrti /1930/). It was his only collection to be reviewed by the knight of Czech critics, František Xaver Šalda, who compared Holan favorably with the French poet Stéphane Mallarmé.

In the 1930s Holan continued writing obscure lyrical poetry and slowly started to express his political feelings (reacting to the Spanish Civil War at first). Political poems Odpověď Francii (The Reply to France), Září 1938 (September 1938) and Zpěv tříkrálový (Twelfth Night Song) were reactions to the situation in Czechoslovakia from September 1938 till March 1939. They also made him more intelligible and popular. The poem called Sen (The Dream) is a presage of a cruel war (published in the Protectorate of Bohemia and Moravia in April 1939). During the war he published several poetic stories in verse inspired by national humiliation. After the war he published an apocalyptic record of events in his Panychida and chanted about the Red Army in Tobě (To You), Rudoarmějci (Red Army Soldiers) and Dík Sovětskému svazu (Thanks to the Soviet Union). He left the Catholic Church and became a member of the Communist Party.

In 1949 after the communist takeover he and Jaroslav Seifert were involved in an argument in which they criticized Soviet poet Vladimir Mayakovsky. As a result, they were both banned from publishing new works. He left the Communist Party and re-entered the Catholic Church.

In the 1950s and 1960s he wrote longer poems mixing reality and lyrical abstraction. He is best known in English for his postwar works, both the often teasingly obscure longer poem Noc s Hamletem (A Night with Hamlet, 1964) which became the most often translated Czech poem, and his short, gnomic lyrical reflections, with occasional submerged notes of political protest. He became a legendary poet-recluse.

He had a daughter, Kateřina, born in 1949 in his bad years and in addition to the social problems she had Down syndrome. He wrote a poem called Bajaja for her, which with Jaroslav Seifert's Maminka, is one of the cornerstone of Czech children's poetry. The book was illustrated by Jiří Trnka. When his daughter died in 1977, Holan lost his will to live and ceased writing. He died in a flat in Prague's riverfront Kampa district in 1980 and was buried in Olšany Cemetery.

When crossing over from nature to existence,
walls are rather unkind,
walls wet from the urine of talents, walls bespattered
by eunuchs revolting against the spirit, walls not diminished
even though they may not yet be born,
and still walls already rounding out the fruit of the womb...

— Vladimír Holan, A Night with Hamlet

== Work ==
=== Poetry ===
==== First poems ====
- Blouznivý vějíř (1926)
- Triumf smrti (1930, 1936, 1948)

==== Experimental lyricism in the 1930s ====
- Vanutí (1932)
- Oblouk (1934)
- Kameni, přicházíš... (1937)

==== Political poems ====
- Září (1938)
- Odpověď Francii (written 1938, released 1945)
- Sen (1939)
- Záhřmotí (1940)
- První testament (1940)
- Zpěv tříkrálový
- Chór

==== Poems celebrating Liberation ====
- Dík Sovětskému svazu (1945)
- Panychida (1945)
- Tobě (1947)
- Rudoarmějci (1947)

==== Lyrical poems after WWII ====
- Bolest
- Strach
- Toskána (1963)
- Mozartiana (1963)
- Noc s Hamletem (1964)
- Noc s Ofélií (1970)
- Bajaja (1955)
- Bez názvu (1963)
- Na postupu (1964)
- Na sotnách (1967)
- Asklépiovi kohouta (1970)
- Předposlední (1982)
- Sbohem? (1982)

==== Epic poetry ====
- Terezka Planetová (1943)
- Cesta mraku (1945)
- Příběhy (1963)

=== Prose ===
- Kolury
- Lemuria
- Hadry, kosti, kůže
- Torzo

== As a translator ==
Holan translated poems from French, German, Russian, Polish and other languages. Among the poets whose works he translated are Rainer Maria Rilke, Mikhail Lermontov, Charles Vildrac, Charles Baudelaire, Jean de La Fontaine, Pierre de Ronsard, Nikolaus Lenau, Adam Mickiewicz or Juliusz Słowacki.
