= Devětsil =

Czech artistic and literary association

The Devětsil (Czech pronunciation: [ˈdɛvjɛtsɪl], literally means "butterbur") was an association of Czech avant-garde artists, founded in 1920 in Prague. From 1923 on there was also an active group in Brno. The movement discontinued its activities in 1930 (1927 in Brno).

== History ==
Founded as Umělecký Svaz Devětsil (Devětsil Artistic Union), its name changed several times. From 1925, it was called the Svaz moderní kultury Devětsil (the Devětsil Union of Modern Culture).

The artistic output of its members was varied, but typically focused on magic realism, proletkult, and, beginning in 1923, Poetism, an artistic program formulated by Vítězslav Nezval and Karel Teige.

The group was very active in organizing the Czech art scene of the period. Members published several art magazines - ReD (Revue Devětsilu), Disk and Pásmo, as well as occasional anthologies (most importantly Devětsil and Život) and organized several exhibitions.

For the most part, Devětsil artists produced poetry and illustration, but they also made contributions to many other art forms, including sculpture, film and even calligraphy.

For about two years Devětsil functioned without any particular theoretical grounding, but as the members changed and those that remained developed and modified their style, it was decided, particularly by Karel Teige, that they begin formulating theories behind their activity. Most of these theories were to be spread through manifestos published by the group. Like any good theorist, Teige was always ready to change his ideas and sometimes moved from one aesthetic to an opposite one. The group formulated a movement that they called Poetism. The long echoed cry, “make it new,” was vital to the Poetists way of thinking. The Devětsil members were surrounded by the new in science, architecture and industry. Even their country was new. In order for art to survive, or at least in order to be worthwhile, it had to constantly be ahead of other changes in life. The Poetists advocated the law of antagonism. This law explains historical progress as reliant on discontinuity. New types and styles of art are continuously necessary for development and vital to these changes are conditions of contradiction. The first manifesto of Devětsil urged new artists to look deeper into ordinary objects for poetic quality. Skyscrapers, airplanes, mimes, and poster lettering were the new arts. Inspired by the Berlin Dadaists, Seifert claimed “art is dead.” Following him, Teige remarked, “the most beautiful paintings in existence today are the ones which were not painted by anyone.”

Between 1923 and 1925, the picture poem was a popular form among the Devětsil artists. Typography and optical poetry was the new lexical standard. Teige explained this transformation of language into visual art as relating to the rise of photography, film and new developments in book printing. For several members of Devětsil, the picture poem replaced painting and eventually both pictures and poems made their way from the page to film. Teige and Seifert began writing film scripts and using the dissolve technique as a way of poetically morphing objects into other objects.

== Significant members ==
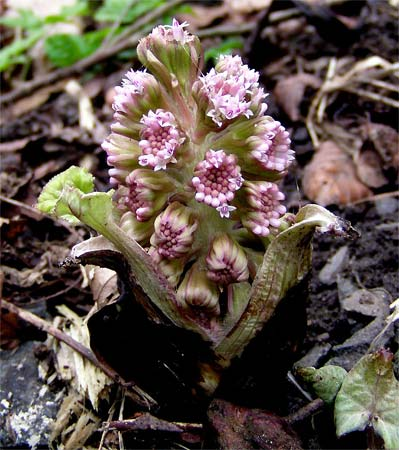
Devětsil is the Czech name for the butterbur plant. The name literally translates to nine forces.

Founders:

- Karel Teige
- Jaroslav Seifert
- Vladislav Vančura
- Adolf Hoffmeister

Most influential members:

- Karel Teige
- Vítězslav Nezval
- Jaroslav Seifert

Poets:

- Konstantin Biebl
- František Halas
- Jiří Wolker
- Jindřich Hořejší

Architects:

- Jaroslav Fragner
- Josef Chochol
- Jaromír Krejcar
- Evžen Linhart

Actors:

- Jiří Voskovec
- Jan Werich

Musicians:

- Jaroslav Ježek

Directors:

- Emil František Burian
- Jindřich Honzl

Writers:

- Karel Konrád
- Vladislav Vančura
- Julius Fučík

Painters:

- Adolf Hoffmeister
- František Muzika
- Jindřich Štyrský
- Toyen

Photographer:

- Jaroslav Rössler

Dancers:

- Milča Mayerová

Teoretics:

- Karel Teige
- Bedřich Václavek

== See also ==
- Left Front
- Czechoslovak New Wave
