= Vítězslav Nezval =

Czech poet, writer and translator (1900–1958)

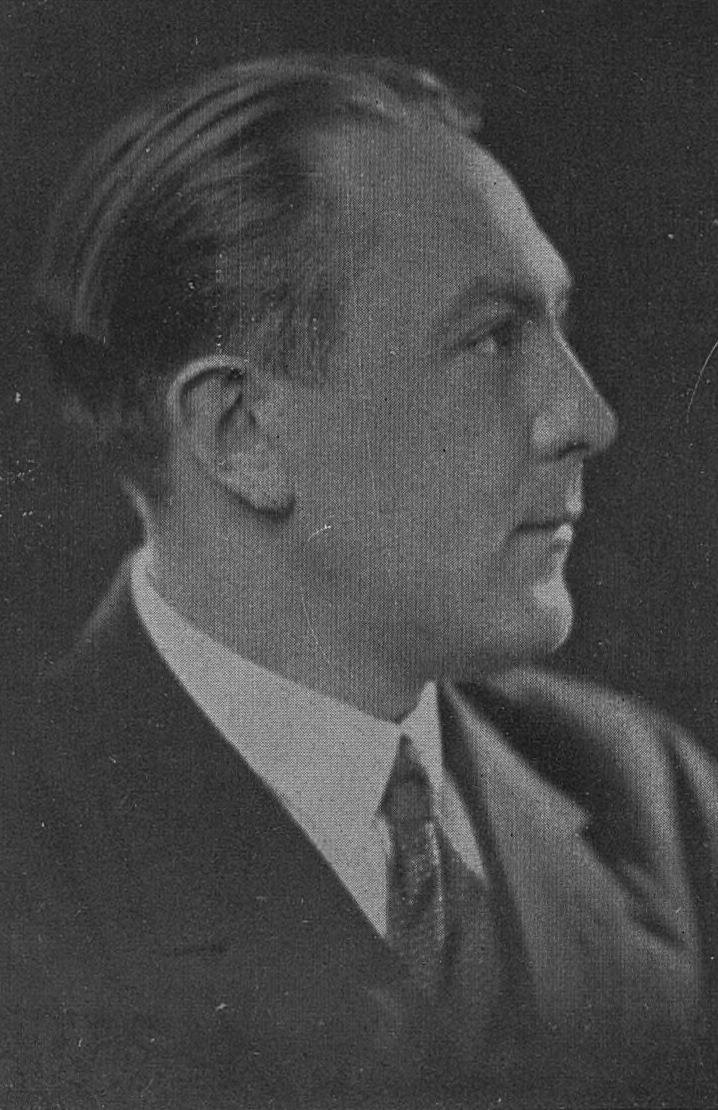
- Nezval in 1934
- Born: 26 May 1900; Biskoupky, Austria-Hungary
- Died: 6 April 1958 (aged 57); Prague, Czechoslovakia
- Resting place: Vyšehrad Cemetery
- Occupation: Poet
- Spouse: Františka Řepová
- Writing career
- Notable works: Edison; Manon Lescaut (theatrical adaptation); Farewell and a Handkerchief; The Absolute Gravedigger; Woman in the Plural; Valerie and Her Week of Wonders

Vítězslav Nezval (Czech: [ˈviːcɛslaf ˈnɛzval]; 26 May 1900 – 6 April 1958) was a Czech poet, writer and translator. He was one of the most prolific avant-garde Czech writers in the first half of the 20th century and a co-founder of the Surrealist movement in Czechoslovakia.

== Early life ==
His father was a school teacher in the village of Biskoupky in Southern Moravia who often traveled to see art exhibitions and was also a musician who studied under the composer Leoš Janáček. At age eleven, Nezval was sent to the gymnasium in Třebíč, where he learned piano and to compose music. He began writing in his teenage years while he was still interested in music. He was said to have played an accordion while studying the stars. In 1918, he was drafted into the Austrian army, but quickly sent home when he became ill. After the first World War, Nezval moved to Prague and began studying philosophy at the Charles University, but he did not receive his degree because he failed to finish his thesis. During this time, he was enchanted by the bustling literary scene that was thriving in the cafés and on the streets of Prague.

== Literary work ==
Vítězslav Nezval was a member of the avant-garde group of artists Devětsil (literally "nine forces", the Czech name of the Butterbur plant but to a Czech-speaker an obvious reference to the nine founding members of the group). Devětsil members were the most prolific Czech artists of their generation. In 1922, the Devetsil group included, but was not limited to, Vítězslav Nezval, Jindřich Štyrský, Jaroslav Seifert, Karel Teige, and Toyen (Marie Cerminová). Also associated with the group was the later founder of the Prague Linguistic School, Roman Jakobson. Like the proletarian group before it, Devětsil looked to France for inspiration for their avant-garde literature and their Marxist political ideology originating from Russia. Though the Czechoslovak state was newly formed after World War I, the younger generation felt there was still room for improvement and that a radical solution was necessary to gain true liberation. Most of these intellectuals had a zest for revolution and professed their allegiance to Lenin. Though their philosopher-president, Tomáš Masaryk, gave them the first real socially-minded democracy, Nezval and others in his group did not accept this regime as representative of their beliefs and goals. In their writings they expressed their preference for the Marxist-internationalist consciousness of class solidarity.

The first manifesto of Devětsil urged young, progressive artists to look deeper into ordinary objects for poetic quality. Skyscrapers, airplanes, mime and poster lettering were the new arts.

In 1925, he had an affair with surrealist Czech filmmaker Zet Molas. He published a number of works inspired by or dedicated to her in the magazine which of which she was editor-in-chief, Český filmovy svět.

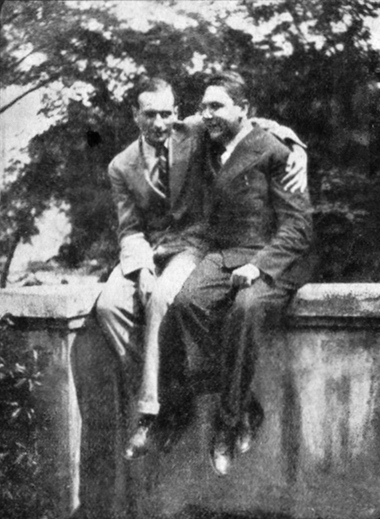
French poet Philippe Soupault and Nezval in 1928

Nezval was also a founding figure of Poetism, a direction within Devětsil primarily theorized by Karel Teige. His output consists of a number of poetry collections, experimental plays and novels, memoirs, essays, and translations. Along with Karel Teige, Jindřich Štyrský, and Toyen, Nezval frequently traveled to Paris where he rubbed shoulders with the French surrealists. His close friendship with André Breton and Paul Éluard was instrumental in founding The Surrealist Group of Czechoslovakia in 1934. It was one of the first surrealist groups outside France, and Nezval served as the editor of its journal Surrealismus.

In collaboration with Nezval on his book Abeceda ('Alphabet'), the Devětsil dancer Milča Mayerová adopted particular poses to represent each of the letters. Nezval wrote this poem focusing on the forms, sounds, and functions of the alphabet. Teige used typography and photomontage to create lasting images of the moves which are now printed in many editions of the book.

Nezval's poem Sbohem a šáteček ('Waving farewell'; 1934) was set to music by the Czech composer Vítězslava Kaprálová in 1937, and was premiered in its orchestral version in 1940 by Rafael Kubelik.

== Later life ==
After the German occupation of Czechoslovakia he became involved in the underground anti-fascist resistance movement and was imprisoned in 1944.

After the liberation of Czechoslovakia Nezval received numerous recognitions and awards for his work. He tried to remain true to the ideals of Poetism and to reconcile them with Socialist realism, which was the new state approved artistic doctrine. He was active in politics and became head of the film department of the Ministry of Information.

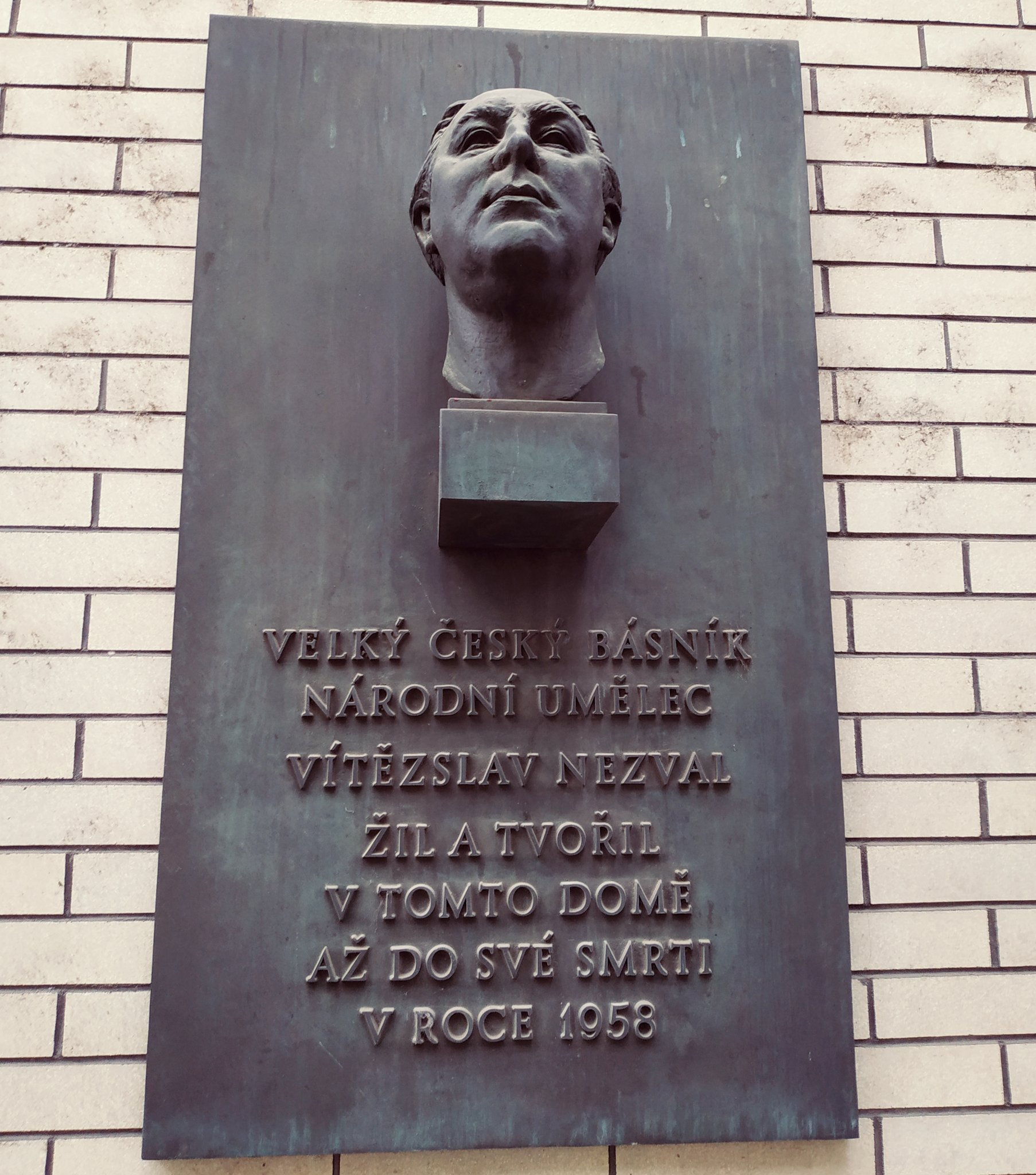
Memorial plaque on the house where he died in 1958

Nezval's health began to deteriorate after the beginning of the 1950s. On April 6, 1958, he died in Prague of acute pneumonia and subsequent heart failure. The first mourning ceremony at took place at the Rudolfinum and he received a state funeral on the 10th of April. He was buried at the Vyšehrad Cemetery in Prague. His written estate was acquired by the archives of the National Literature Memorial.

== Bibliography of English translations ==
- 1941 Daylight, Volume 1 includes Three Poems of Prague, selected from Praha s prsty deště (1936), translated by Ewald Osers, The Hogarth Press.
- 1943 New Writing and Daylight, Summer 1943, contains Historical Picture, a translation of Historický obraz (1939) by Norman Cameron and Jiří 'George' Mucha, Hogarth Press.
- 1945 Modern Czech Poetry contains selected poems translated by Ewald Osers & J.K. Montgomery, George Allen & Unwin for Prague Press.
- 1950 Song of Peace, translation of Zpěv míru (1950) by Jack Lindsay and Stephen Jolly, Fore Publications.
- 1959 Song of Peace, contains a translation of Zpěv míru (1950) by Walter Lowenfels, Roving Eye Press.
- 1971 Three Czech Poets: Vítězslav Nezval, Antonin Bartosek and Joseph Hanzlik, selection of Nezval's poems translated by Ewald Osers, Penguin Books Ltd.
- 2001 Alphabet, translation of Abeceda (1926) by Jindrich Toman and Matthew S. Witkovsky, Michigan Slavic Publications.
- 2001 Antilyrik & Other Poems, translated by Jerome Rothenberg & Milos Sovak, Green Integer Press.
- 2003 Edison: Poem with Five Cantos, a translation of Edison (1927), by Ewald Osers, Dvorak.
- 2004 Edition 69, includes Sexual Nocturne- The story of unmasked illusions, a translation of Sexualni nocturno- Príbeh demaskované iluse (1928), by Jed Slast, Twisted Spoon Press.
- 2005 Valerie And Her Week Of Wonders, translation of Valerie a týden divů (1945) by David Short, Twisted Spoon Press.
- 2009 Prague With Fingers of Rain, translation of Praha s prsty deště (1936) by Ewald Osers, Bloodaxe Books.
- 2016 The Absolute Gravedigger, translation of Absolutní hrobař (1937) by Stephan Delbos and Tereza Novicka, Twisted Spoon Press.
- 2020 Farewell and a Handkerchief: Poems from the Road, translation of Sbohem a šáteček (1934) by Roman Kostovski, Plamen Press.
- 2021 Woman in the Plural: Verse, Diary Entries, Poetry for the Stage, Surrealist Experiments, translation of Žena v množném čísle (1936) by Stephan Delbos and Tereza Novicka, Twisted Spoon Press.
- 2024 A Prague Flaneur, translation of Pražský chodec (1938) by Jed Slast, Twisted Spoon Press.
