= Jindřich Štyrský =

Czech painter

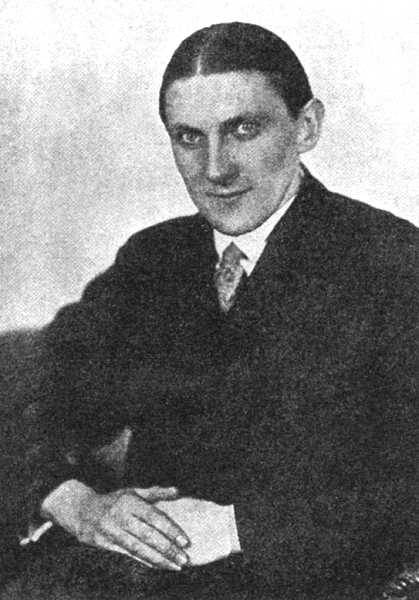
- Štyrský in 1930
- Born: 11 August 1899; Čermná u Kyšperka, Austria-Hungary
- Died: 21 March 1942 (aged 42); Prague, Protectorate of Bohemia and Moravia
- Style: Surrealist
- Movement: Devětsil

Jindřich Štyrský (11 August 1899 – 21 March 1942) was a Czech Surrealist painter, poet, editor, photographer and graphic artist.

His outstanding and varied oeuvre included numerous book covers and illustrations. He also wrote studies of both Arthur Rimbaud and Marquis de Sade. Along with his artistic partner Toyen (Marie Čermínová), he became a member of Devětsil in 1923, participating in their group exhibitions. He and Toyen also exhibited in Paris in the late 1920s, where they founded their own movement, Artificialism. Between 1928 and 1929 he was designer for the group's drama wing, the Osvobozené divadlo, where he collaborated with Vítězslav Nezval and others. Štyrský was also an active editor. In addition to his Edition 69 series, he edited the Erotická revue, which he launched in 1930, and Odeon, where many of his shorter texts appeared. He was a founding member of The Surrealist Group of Czechoslovakia.

== Important works ==
Emilie comes to me in a dream, 1931, published as part of his Edition 69 series. On the Needles of the Days, 1941, photographic series in collaboration with Jindřich Heisler who provided the text.

== Life ==
Štyrský was born on 11 August 1899 in Dolní Čermná (that time called Čermná u Kyšperka), where he spent his childhood. The death of his half-sister in 1905, with whom he had a very strong relationship, greatly affected his later life and artistic creation. He studied first in Hradec Králové, then the Academy of Fine Arts, Prague. He was very active in the art world, was a member of Devětsil beginning in 1923, and in the years 1932–1942 was a member of the Fine Artists Association. His early artistic work was partly under the influence of Cubism, but he later became a surrealist.

During the summer in 1922, he met Marie Čermínová (1902–1980), who later began using the pseudonym Toyen. They worked closely as an artistic pair. In Prague in 1923, they became members of the Devětsil group. Later, in Paris, they established their own two-person movement, Artificialism, which their associate Karel Teige linked to his own Poetism. After returning to Prague he became designer for the Liberated Theatre.

In 1934, with Toyen, Bohuslav Brouk, Vítězslav Nezval, and others, he co-founded the Surrealist Group of Czechoslovakia in Prague. At the invitation of the Parisian Surrealists in 1935 he returned again to Paris. There Štyrský became seriously ill, probably the same heart condition as his sister. He recovered during his stay, though only temporarily.

He died on 21 March 1942 in Prague of pneumonia.
