= Karel Teige =

Czech artist and art theorist (1900–1951)

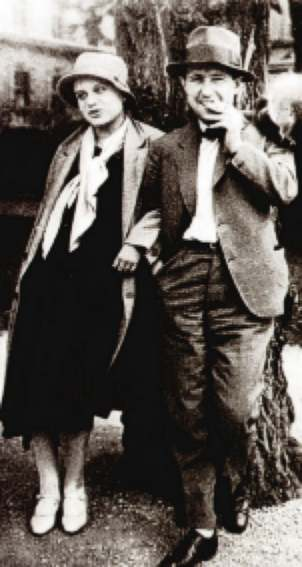
- Teige with Toyen in 1925
- Born: 13 December 1900; Prague, Austria-Hungary
- Died: 1 October 1951 (aged 50); Prague, Czechoslovakia
- Occupations: Publicist, literary critic
- Relatives: Josef Teige (father)

Karel Teige (13 December 1900 – 1 October 1951) was a Czech modernist avant-garde artist, writer, critic and one of the most important figures of the 1920s and 1930s movement. He was a member of the Devětsil (Butterbur) movement in the 1920s and also worked as an editor and graphic designer for Devětsil's monthly magazine ReD (Revue Devětsilu). One of his major works on architecture theory is The Minimum Dwelling (1932).

== Life and career ==
Teige was born in Prague. With evidently endless energy, he introduced modern art to Prague. Devětsil-sponsored exhibitions and events brought international avant-garde figures like Le Corbusier, Man Ray, Paul Klee, Vladimir Mayakovsky, and Walter Gropius, among many others, to lecture and perform in Prague. Teige interpreted their work, sometimes literally, for the Czech audience. In his 1935 Prague lecture, André Breton paid tribute to his "perfect intellectual fellowship" with Teige and Nezval: "Constantly interpreted by Teige in the most lively way, made to undergo an all-powerful lyric thrust by Nezval, Surrealism can flatter itself that it has blossomed in Prague as it has in Paris."

Teige contributed to the 1926 book Abeceda 'Alphabet', which included a collection of poems by Nezval, one for each letter of the alphabet. The poems were set against a photomontage that Teige designed; bringing together typography and photographs. The photographs, taken by Karel Paspa, were posed images of the choreographer Milča Mayerová. Mayerová created a choreographed piece that accompanied Nezval's poems, and the photographs were stills from that piece.

Although not an architect, Teige was an articulate and knowledgeable architecture critic, an active participant in CIAM, and friends with Hannes Meyer, the second director of the Bauhaus. From 1929 to 1930 he gave guest lectures at the Bauhaus in Dessau. At the same time, he participated in the establishment of the Left Front.

Teige and Meyer both believed in a scientific, functionalist approach to architecture, grounded in Marxist principles. In 1929 he famously criticized Le Corbusier's Mundaneum project (planned for Geneva but never built) on the grounds that Corbusier had departed from rational functionalism, and was on his way to becoming a mere stylist. Teige believed that 'the only aim and scope of modern architecture is the scientific solution of exact tasks of rational construction.'

After welcoming the Soviet army as liberators, Teige was silenced by the Communist government in 1948. In 1951 he died in Prague of a heart attack, said to be a result of a ferocious Soviet press campaign against him as a 'Trotskyist degenerate,' his papers were destroyed by the secret police, and his published work was suppressed for decades.

== Writings ==
=== Original versions ===
==== Studies ====
- Stavba a báseň (1927)
- Svět, který se směje (1928)
- Svět, který voní (1930)
- Surrealismus proti proudu (1938)
- Jarmark umění (1964)

==== Scientific writings ====
- Archipenko (1923)
- Jan Zrzavý (1923)
- Soudobá mezinárodní architektura (1928)
- Sovětská kultura (1928)
- Moderní architektura v Československu (1930. Translated to English and published as Modern Architecture in Czechoslovakia and Other Writings in 2000)
- Nejmenší byt (1932. Translated to English and published as The Minimum Dwelling in 2002)
- Zahradní města nezaměstnaných (1933)
- Architektura pravá a levá (1934)
- Vývoj sovětské architektury (1936)
- Vladimír Majakovskij (1936)
- Štyrský a Toyen (1938 with Vítězslav Nezval)
- Moderní fotografie v Československu (1947)
- Sociologie architektury (date unknown)
- Fenomenologie moderního umění (unfinished work, The Phenomenology of Modern Art. Two parts of this work were published posthumously as Vývojové proměny v umění (Developmental Changes in Art) in 1966.)

=== English Editions ===
- Modern Architecture in Czechoslovakia and Other Writings (Texts & Documents), J P Getty Trust Pubn, 2000, ISBN 0-89236-596-X
- The Minimum Dwelling, MIT Press, 2002, ISBN 0-262-20136-4
- The Marketplace of Art, Rab-Rab Press, 2022, ISBN 978-952-69389-8-1

== Secondary literature ==
- Karel Teige. L'Enfant Terrible of the Czech Modernist Avant-Garde, ed. by Eric Dluhosch and Rostislav Svácha, MIT Press, 1999, ISBN 0-262-04170-7 - includes 4 Essays about Teige.
- Esther Levinger: "A life in nature - Karel Teige's journey from Poetism to Surrealism" In: Zeitschrift für Kunstgeschichte, vol. 67.2004, 3, pp. 401–420.
- Peter A. Zusi: "The Style of the Present: Karel Teige on Constructivism and Poetism" in: Representations, 88. Fall 2004, pp. 102–124.
- Prager Architektur und die europäische Moderne, ed. by Tomáš Valena and Ulrich Winko, Berlin: Mann, 2006.
- Radu-Alexandra Răuţă: "Shifting meanings of modernism: parallels and contrasts between Karel Teige and Cezar Lăzărescu" in: The journal of architecture, Royal Institute of British Architects. - Bd. 14.2009, 1, S. 27-44.
