= Jaroslav Seifert =

Czech writer and poet (1901–1986)

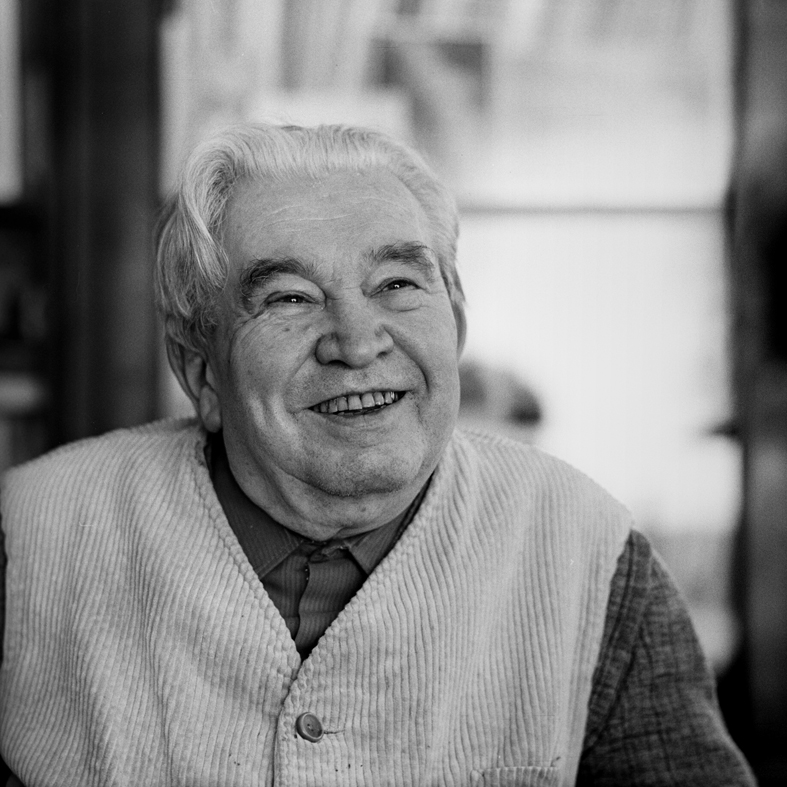
- Jaroslav Seifert in 1981
- Born: 23 September 1901; Žižkov, Prague, Austria-Hungary
- Died: 10 January 1986 (aged 84); Prague, Czechoslovakia
- Occupations: Writer, poet, journalist
- Writing career
- Notable awards: Nobel Prize in Literature; 1984

Jaroslav Seifert (Czech: [ˈjaroslaf ˈsajfr̩t]; 23 September 1901 – 10 January 1986) was a Czech writer, poet and journalist. Seifert was awarded the 1984 Nobel Prize in Literature "for his poetry which endowed with freshness, sensuality and rich inventiveness provides a liberating image of the indomitable spirit and versatility of man".

== Biography ==
Born in Žižkov, a suburb of Prague in what was then part of Austria-Hungary, Seifert's first collection of poems was published in 1921. He was a member of the Communist Party of Czechoslovakia (KSČ), the editor of a number of communist newspapers and magazines – Rovnost, Sršatec, and Reflektor – and the employee of a communist publishing house.

During the 1920s he was considered a leading representative of the Czechoslovak artistic avant-garde. He was one of the founders of the journal Devětsil. In March 1929, he and six other writers left the KSČ after signing a manifesto protesting against Bolshevized Stalinist-influenced tendencies in the new leadership of the party. He subsequently worked as a journalist in the social-democratic and trade union press during the 1930s and 1940s.

In 1949 Seifert left journalism and began to devote himself exclusively to literature. His poetry was awarded important state prizes in 1936, 1955, and 1968, and in 1967 he was designated National Artist. He was the official Chairman of the Czechoslovak Writer's Union for several years (1968–70). In 1977 he was one of the signatories of Charter 77 in opposition to the government of the Czechoslovak Socialist Republic.

Seifert was awarded the Nobel Prize in Literature in 1984. Due to bad health, he was not present at the award ceremony, and so his daughter accepted the Nobel Prize in his name. Even though it was a matter of great importance, there was only a brief remark of the award in the state-controlled media. He died on 10 January 1986, aged 84.

He was buried in the family tomb in Kralupy nad Vltavou. His burial was marked by a high presence of the communist secret police, the StB, who tried to suppress any hint of dissent on the part of mourners. His wife died in 1988.

== Works ==
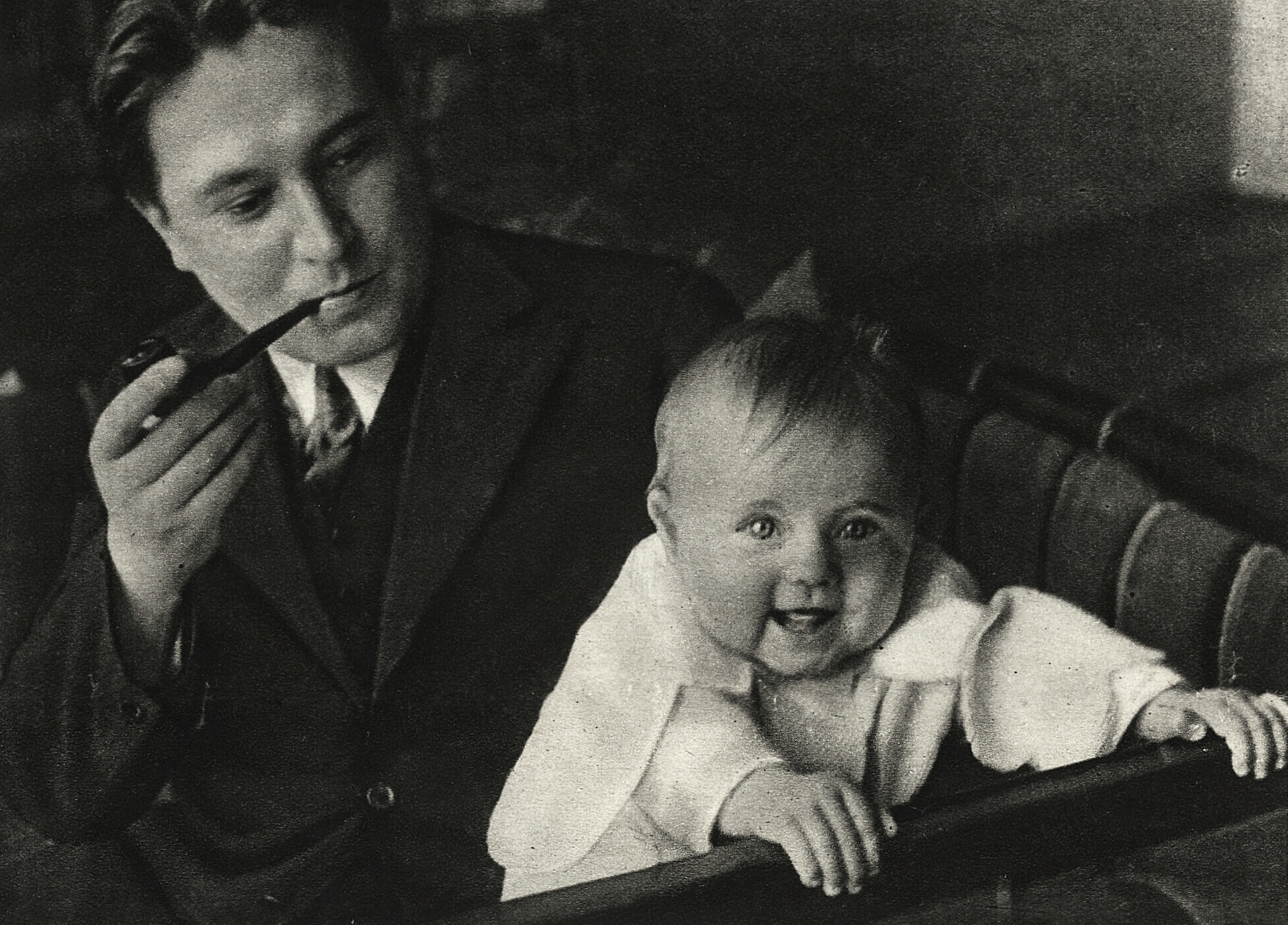
Jaroslav Seifert with daughter Jana, 1931

- Město v slzách (City in Tears, 1921)
- Samá láska (Nothing but Love / Sheer Love, 1923)
- Na vlnách TSF (On Wireless Waves / On the Waves of TSF, 1925)
- Slavík zpívá špatně (The Nightingale Sings Badly/Poorly, 1926)
- Básně (Poems, 1929)
- Poštovní holub (Carrier Pigeon, 1929)
- Hvězdy nad Rajskou zahradou (Stars Above the Garden of Eden, 1929)
- Jablko z klína (An Apple from the Lap, 1933)
- Ruce Venušiny (The Hands of Venus, 1936)
- Zpíváno do rotačky (Songs for the Rotary Press, 1936)
- Jaro, sbohem (Goodbye, Spring, 1937)
- Zhasněte světla (Turn Off the Lights, 1938)
- Vějíř Boženy Němcové (Božena Němcová's Fan, 1940)
- Světlem oděná (Robed in Light, 1940)
- Kamenný most (The Stone Bridge, 1944)
- Přilba hlíny (A Helmetful of Earth, 1945)
- Ruka a plamen (The Hand and the Flame, 1948)
- Šel malíř chudě do světa (The Painter Walks Poor into the World, 1949)
- Píseň o Viktorce (A Song About Victorka, 1950)
- Maminka (Mother, 1954)
- Chlapec a hvězdy (The Boy and the Stars, 1956)
- Praha a Věnec sonetů (A Wreath of Sonnets, 1956). English translation by Jan Křesadlo
- Zrnka révy (Grapeseeds, 1965)
- Koncert na ostrově (Concert on the Island, 1965)
- Halleyova kometa (Halley's Comet, 1967)
- Odlévání zvonů (The Casting of the Bells, 1967)
- Kniha o Praze (A Book about Prague, 1968)
- Morový sloup (The Plague Column, 1968–1970)
- Deštník z Picadilly (An Umbrella from Piccadilly, 1979)
- Všecky krásy světa (All the Beauties of the World, 1979, 1981?)
- Býti básníkem (To Be a Poet, 1983)
