= Rozseč =

Rozseč may refer to places in the Czech Republic:

- Rozseč (Jihlava District), a municipality and village in the Vysočina Region
- Rozseč (Žďár nad Sázavou District), a municipality and village in the Vysočina Region
- Rozseč nad Kunštátem, a municipality and village in the South Moravian Region
