= Kunštát (disambiguation) =

Kunštát is a town in the South Moravian Region in the in Czech Republic.

Kunštát may also refer to places in the Czech Republic:

- Kunštát Castle
- Kunštát, a village and part of Orlické Záhoří in the Hradec Králové Region

== See also ==
- Poděbrady family, which arose from the Lords of Kunštát
