= Slovak National Uprising Square (Ostrava) =

Public square in Ostrava, Czech Republic

- Former name: Stalingrad Square
- Namesake: Slovak National Uprising
- Location: Ostrava, Moravian-Silesian Region, Czech Republic

Other
- Designer: Jiří Kroha

Slovak National Uprising Square (Czech: náměstí Slovenského národního povstání, short form "náměstí SNP") is a public square in Ostrava, Czech Republic. The square is located in Ostrava-Jih, the most populous district of the Moravian-Silesian metropole. Developed over the course of the 1950s, it is currently named after one of the most important historical events in Slovak history, the Slovak National Uprising (Czech: Slovenské národní povstání, Slovak: Slovenské národné povstanie).

== Name ==
Initially, following the first phases of its construction in 1955, the newly created square took the name of the housing estate of which it was to become the natural centre. Thus it became Stalingrad Square (Czech: Stalingradské náměstí) after sídliště Stalingrad (free translation: "Stalingrad City", strictly: "Stalingrad Housing Estate"), the estate having been named after the historical battle of Stalingrad, which itself took its name from that of Soviet leader Joseph Stalin.

In 1963, a proposal appeared to rename the square "Metallurgist Square" (Czech: Hutnické náměstí), primarily to acknowledge the industrial role of the city, as well as to reflect the fact that the trade union of the main metallurgical factory "Nová Huť" operated the palace of culture located in the square.

The current name was established in 1969, on the occasion of the 25th anniversary of the beginning of the anti-fascist Slovak National Uprising. This was a pivotal event in Slovak national history, which the communist government of Czechoslovakia- in which the square was located priori to the state's dissolution and the subsequent founding of the Czech Republic on 1 January 1993- controversially presented as being attributable to the efforts of Communist forces.

== Geography ==
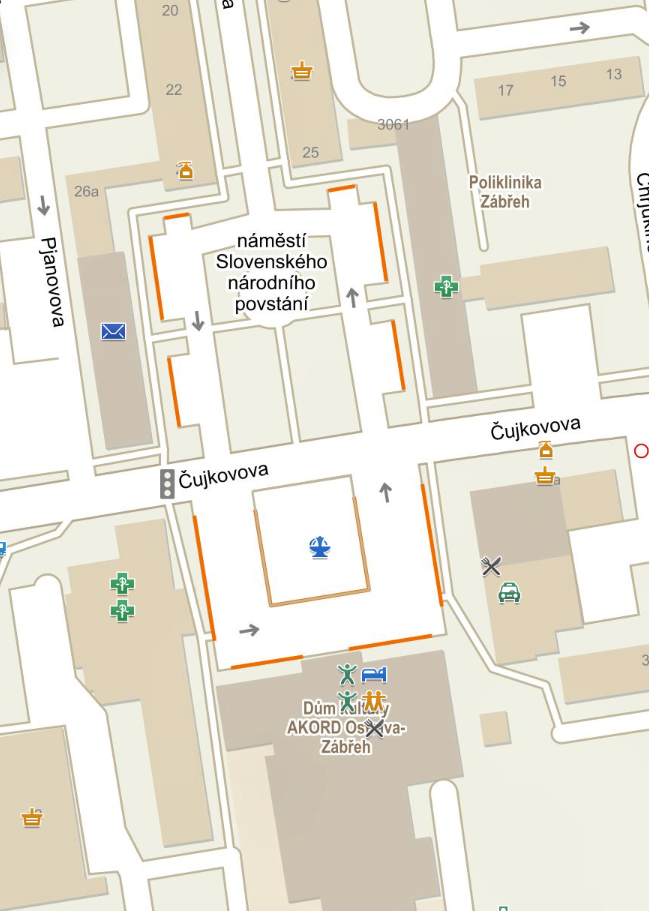
Map of the Slovak National Uprising Square in Ostrava showing surrounding public buildings.

The square, of approximately 7,550 square metres, is situated in Ostrava-Jih, the southernmost and the most populous district of the metropolitan region Ostrava. The main road of this part of the district, Čujkovova Street, traverses the square from west to east. At the northern end of the square Rodimcevova Street begins.

Four main buildings – a palace of culture, a department store, a post office, and a health clinic – are located along the boundaries of the square, providing basic socio-cultural functions for the local population. On the opposite side of the department store there is also a police station and a restaurant. As for the inner part of the square, on the north side of the Čujkovova Street, there is a sort of a small park with a pavement and a few benches, which serves as a relaxing zone in between the post office and health clinic buildings. Most of the southern part is occupied by a car park, which includes parking places for police cars. On the same side there is also an artistically arranged fountain.

Outside the square, in its closest environs, there are residential houses, a mixture of tenements built according to the socialist-realist style from the earlier stage of the district's construction, and panel buildings from the late 1970s. In the close vicinity of the square is also a green element of the district, the Bělský forest (Czech: Bělský les).

The names of the majority of the streets adjacent to the square (Čujkovova, Pjanovova, Asejevova, etc.), are taken from Soviet soldiers who fought in the battle of Stalingrad.

== History ==
The construction of the housing estate near Bělský forest, which surrounds the current Slovak National Uprising Square, began on 26 August 1947, with a groundbreaking ceremony.

The construction of such model housing estates in industrial areas of post-war Czechoslovakia, such as Kladno, Most and Ostrava, was intended to show that it is possible to create modern, healthy and friendly housing. In its ideal form, each housing estate should possess school facilities as well as shops; the central square should contain a cultural centre, and a church alongside other public services. Construction of the first part of the district began in 1946.

=== 1948 - 1990 ===
The idea of the right to housing for all people, and especially for workers, was amplified in Czechoslovakia following the Communist coup d’état of February 1948. Consequently, the country adopted many of the urbanist and architectural ideals of the Soviet Union and other countries of the so-called Eastern Bloc, as a way of becoming more homogeneous with other communist states in the region and of achieving this goal. Thus, in 1950 the housing estate was renamed Stalingrad (a battle more significant in Soviet than in Czechoslovak history). Construction work resumed according to a modified project (this included the removal of the church in the central square from the plan, due to the communist advocacy of atheism, which utilised classical forms of socialist realism architecture, but keeping the original urban structure. The project and the whole urban conception was prepared under direction of Jiří Kroha, one of the main architects of the new communist regime, who promoted the new style of socialist realism. With his collaborators from the Prague Master Studio (Mistrovský ateliér), Kroha created a design for the square, which was headed by the palace of culture and flanked by the post office, health centre and department store, but also grocery shops.

The new Stalingrad housing estate soon had to face its first problem, which was the lack of amenities for everyday life. The biggest issue was the lack of shops, which made access to food and other essential resources difficult. This had a profound effect on the growing population of the new Stalingrad district, composed mainly of the employees of the metallurgical factory Nová Huť (at the time NHKG - Nová Huť Klementa Gottwalda), named after the first communist President of Czechoslovakia), the Vítkovické železárny (VŽKG, also named after Klement Gottwald) steelworks, and their families.

Despite this, the first buildings to be constructed were the health clinic and the post office. This construction commenced in 1952, running until 1955 for the former and 1957 for the latter. Both of them are, like the other buildings present on the square, designed in the socialist-realist style.

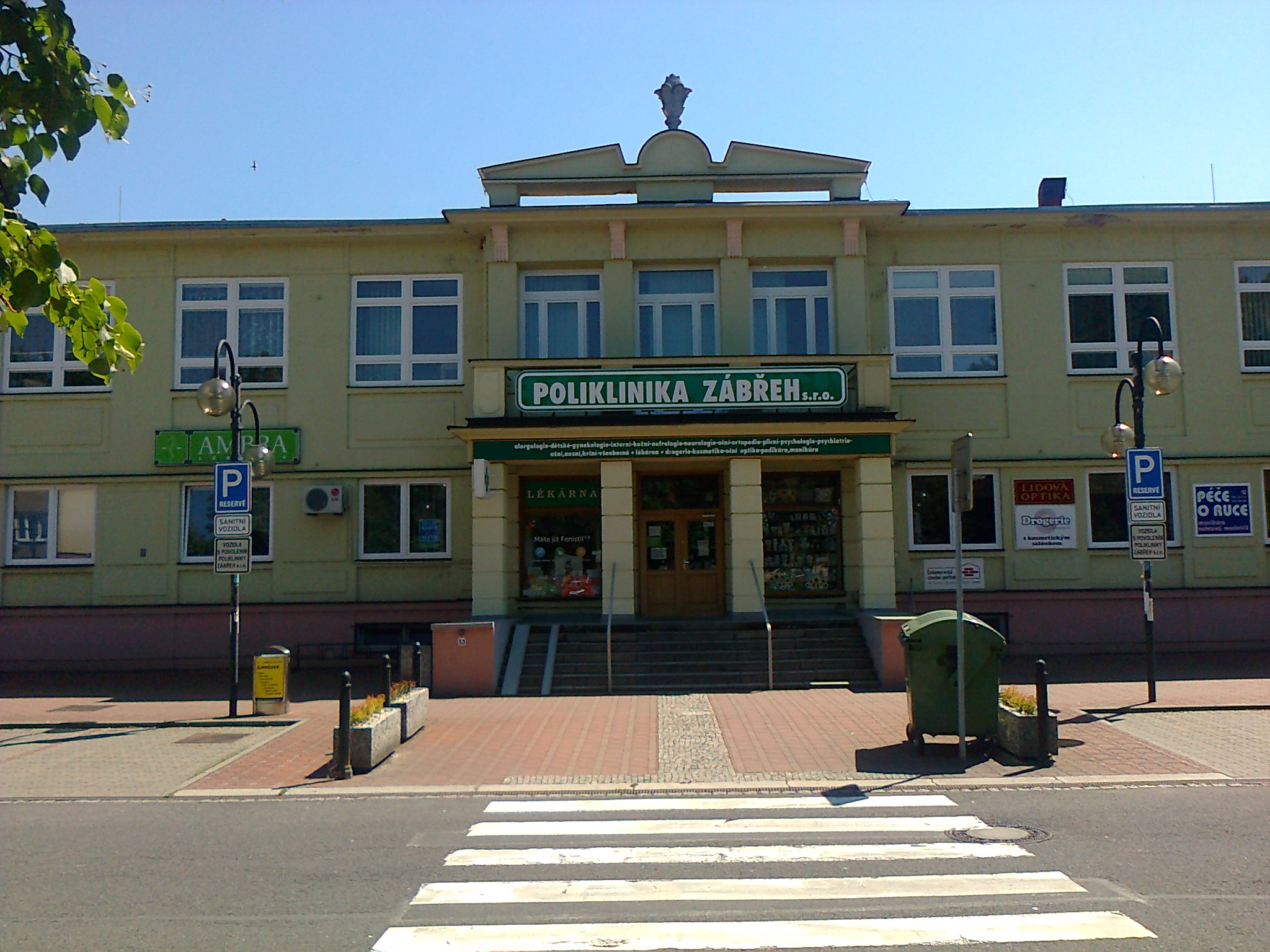
The health centre on the side of the square.

The construction of the much needed department store was launched in 1955, with the facility finally being opened on 1 June 1958 under the name"Průkopník" (The Pioneer). The cornerstone of the square's largest and most impressive building, intended to host a number of social and cultural activities: the NHKG palace of culture (Kulturní dům NHKG), today called Kulturní dům Akord, was laid on 30 April 1956, the day of the anniversary of liberation of Ostrava in 1945. Its construction was completed, and the palace of culture was inaugurated and festively opened, on 22 February 1959. With the finalization of the works on the palace of culture, the square's creation was ultimately accomplished. Moreover, the construction of the whole Stalingrad housing estate, including its central point, the Slovak National Uprising Square, was therefore finished. Fitting with the socio-cultural facilities that determine the nature of this common space, a bookshop was opened on the corner with Rodimcevova street.

Thus, during the period of socialist regime in Czechoslovakia from 1948 to 1989, the square played an important role as a public space, on the one hand as a place that was able to offer all the necessary services - healthcare, shops, post office - as well as the cultural activities that were happening either inside the palace of culture, or on the square itself.

=== 1990 - now ===
After the Velvet Revolution at the end of the 1989, the change of the regime, from one with the leading role of Communist party to a plural democracy, was obviously in general reflected in the public space as well. Nevertheless, due to the fact that the functions of the buildings were mostly determined by their original planning, and the institutions of post office and healthcare services remained managed by the State, the function of most of the main buildings remained the same, even after the regime change. Therefore, there is still a functioning cultural house, that continues to bear many roles in the life of the district, a still functioning post-office and a health clinic facility.

One of the few changes in the Slovak National Uprising Square was the transition of the department store from a socialist Prior, common name of all the bigger department stores in Czechoslovak Socialist Republic, to its liberal-democratic and capitalist successors. The building was privatized and it successively changed its owners and the composition of the shops inside.

== Notable structures ==
In 1951 the architect Kroha modified the original intended functionalist concept of the square - a rectangular space with asymmetrically composed buildings - and designed a space with symmetrical and horizontally developed palatial buildings. The House of Culture in the axis of the square is conceived as a dominating feature with a buttress rhythmized by front pillars, equipped with period-specific figural sculptural decoration. The interiors already showed a tendency towards the Brussels style.

=== Akord Culture House ===
Palace of Culture NHKG (1960)

The House of Culture in the axis of the square is conceived as a "dominating feature of the square with a rhythmized front pillars, equipped with period-specific figural sculptural decoration - in front there is a statue of a male and female labourer (Dělník a Dělnice). The interiors already showed a tendency towards the Brussels style".

These days, the Cultural house is an important place in the cultural life of the district. Every year, it prepares a plethora of cultural exhibitions such as theatre plays, but also educational, movement and language courses, balls, and concert. For the high school youth, the traditional dancing classes take place every year. Akord has a newly renovated hotel, as well as 3 halls, 7 lounges, 4 classrooms 3 exercise rooms, and a summer garden. It also includes a restaurant.

=== Department store ===
The construction of the department store took almost three years, and as such it could not be inaugurated until 1 June 1958. The new department store, built as the rest of the square in the socialist-realist style, was named Pioneer (Průkopník). Initially, the department store had a total of 21 sales departments selling a wide range of items. On the ground floor, customers could find perfumery, jewellery, paper, musical instruments, school and sporting goods, tobacco, children's goods, glass and porcelain, sewing machines, motorcycles, electrical goods and kitchenware. On the first floor there were departments for men's, women's and children's clothing and hats, textile and leather haberdashery, knitwear and shoes. On the second floor, customers could buy metre textiles, white goods and home textiles.

The department store still partially fulfils its function. However, it now offers a more narrow selection of goods, with the number of shops having diminished since 1990. As of 2022, it contains a pharmacy, and a textile shop, alongside a few offices.

=== Post Office and Medical Clinic ===
The things, thanks to their juxtaposition, creates a pair of single-storey buildings forming the long sides of the square. The first to be completed was a T-shaped health clinic with a developed apparatus of classical and Empire-inspired elements and details. A side entrance with statues of children faces the side street. As built, the health clinic was closest to Kroha's proposal, with a central entrance marked by a portico and a triangular pediment piece on roof topped by a flowerlike sculpture.

The opposite side of the post office is a single-winged building, somewhat restrained in its expression, as it was only completed at a time of abandonment of Stalinist ornamentation as a result of criticism of socialist realism after 1955.

=== "Sunbathing" Statue ===
In front of the Cultural house, there is a fountain-plastic statue "Sunbathing" (Slunění) by Václav Fidrich from 1995. This explicit architectural element propose a bench all around its installation.

== Everyday use ==
The square, thanks to its urban concept, is supposed to serve as the centre of a part of the housing-estate near Bělský forest, which has been gradually built up since the end of the World War.

Over a classic working day, during the approximate period of the working hours, the square serves as a public space, satisfying basic civic needs, whether concerning health care, postal services or shopping, with the buildings that surround it. The register of civic amenities is filled with the presence of a cultural house, which offers various forms of leisure activities, from exercising to watching a theater play. The car park, located in front of the Culture house, also contributes to the serviceability of the square and forms a substantial part of its public active use.

However, the square is mostly a transit public space. Except for the few events, not a lot of people stay in the area of the square for longer time. Usually, they only visit the service proposed and continue either to the bus station, to a different part of the district, or they return home.

Moreover, a decisive factor is also the immediate vicinity of the square, which has long had a bad reputation due to the phenomenon of the ancient worker's dormitory and their problematic management, and a section of the residents who disturb the quiet atmosphere of the housing estate. The "residences" (ubytovny) work in short-term rentals, which are mostly abused by local entrepreneurs.

As for public transport, approximately 50m from the area of the square, between the local market and the building sheltering multiple services (day centre for the disabled, teashop, tobacco shop), the "Náměstí SNP" (Slovak National Uprising Square) bus stop is located. This is serviced by number 27, 31, 41, 48, 61, 77, 96 buses under the management of Ostrava Municipal Public Transport. Beside the health clinic, there is a station for the Nextbike shared bikes, created in 2019.

== Events ==
Until 2014, the square was the venue for the district's annual festivities, which usually attracted a significant number of the district's residents and also offered performances by several popular Czech artists. The Festivities were organised by the culture house Akord. From 2018 onwards, the Festivities takes place on the field of a former football stadium that is, nevertheless, located in the close vicinity (some 300 metres) of the square.

The traditional lighting of the Christmas tree, very popular among the district's and housing-estate population also takes place every year.

== Place of political expression ==
Like many squares and public spaces, the Slovak National Uprising Square has also been a place of a political expression.

=== 1968 ===
One of the first documented political protests in the Slovak National Uprising Square (at the time still Stalingrad Square) occurred as a response to the Warsaw Pact invasion of Czechoslovakia that took place between the 20 and 21 August 1968.

=== 2013 ===
In 2013, a "Protest against the expansion of hostels for the inadaptable" was held on the square. The demonstration of roughly 1 000 people, organized by the extreme-right non-parliamentary political party "Workers' Party of Social Justice", turned into a hate march against one of the housing estate's block of flats, whose inhabitants are in the most cases Roma minority. The newspaper Hospodářské noviny describes the following moments as such:

"Individuals in the front rows began shouting at the Roma people in the windows and at the riot police unit who blocked their path. The shouting and wild gesticulations were replaced by the detonation of cannons and firecrackers and the sound of shattering glass from broken bottles. But the clashes continued. Protesters were surrounded by cordons of police in dark alleys. They then ambushed them with stones and glass bottles. Trash containers were left overturned, road signs were broken, and trash cans were ripped out. The police again used tear gas to control the situation."

== Surroundings ==
Thanks to the post-war plans, the whole estate was initially intended to be built in the same functionalist spirit according to the plans of Anna Friedlová, Jaroslav Turek, Jiří Štursa and Otakar Slabý. "Our duplexes (Dvouletky, literally: "Two-years-houses") were built in 1948-1949 during the two-year economic plan, hence the naming of the houses. Subsequently, the functionalist project was rejected as too expensive and the five-year economic plan came along. There was a need for many flats, for workers from all over the country who came to Ostrava to work in the steelworks and mines", states in the interview a long time resident of the housing estate. The rest of the neighbourhood of the Square is built in the socialist-realism style from the 1950s, but also in a less-artistically and ornamental, "plain", style from the 1960s, and finally partly formed by the block of flats from 1970s and 1980s.

The surroundings of the square are marked by the historical post-revolutionary (1989) division of the housing stock. Since housing estates of this type, plus the present "residencies" (ubytovny), were built in the Ostrava region mainly for employees of mines and factories (sometimes for a short-term rental) even after the revolution the local mining giant OKD inherited a considerable part of the local housing stock. This was gradually privatised. As a result, the city of Ostrava does not have a sufficient number of flats to own and has had very limited opportunity since the 1990s to provide, for example, social housing for citizens who are in foreclosure or face other financial problems. As a result, these flats and residential hotels are being bought up by entrepreneurs who offer housing to the poorest, usually Roma. The entrepreneurs have taken advantage, especially in the 2010s, of the state allowance and the housing subsidy provided to the poorest inhabitants of the Czech Republic. In June 2013, the local labour office paid over CZK 46 million to 14,000 people. The state project to help people in need by offering social housing went awry, and instead of providing decent, rent-controlled apartments for low-income people, those whose discrimination made it impossible to live elsewhere began to move into apartments - in poor condition, with disproportionately high rents and unfavourable contracts.

== Other "Náměstí SNP" ==
Due to historical importance of the event, many other Czech and Slovak towns have their own "náměstí Slovenského národního povstání", squares of the "Slovak National Uprising". These include:

- Brno - Brno-sever district
- Bratislava - SNP Square
- Banská Bystrica - SNP Square
- 36 other Squares

== Place in Ostrava's urban landscape ==
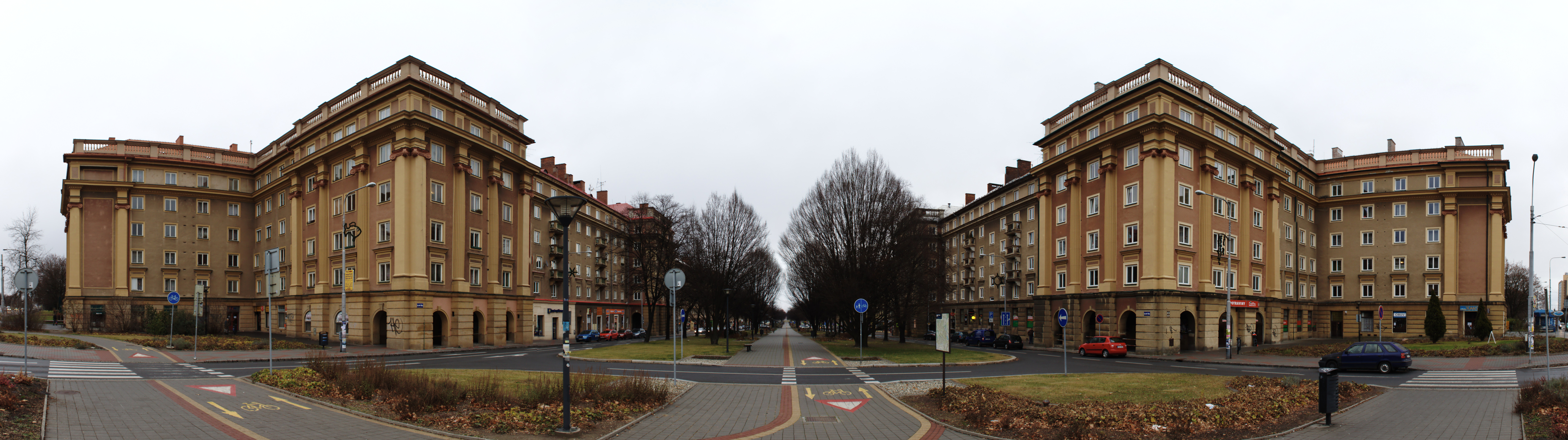
Ostrava-Poruba, 17 listopadu Street, beginning of the Hlavní Avenue (during socialism period Lenin Avenue) Ostrava-Poruba, "Oblouk", jižní strana ("The Arc", southern side) Ostrava, Dům kultury (Palace of Culture)

The architectural features of the square correspond to the socialist Czechoslovak post-war architecture inspired by the Soviet Union. These allow it to fit into the urban landscape of the city, which was strongly influenced by its development associated with the industrial growth in post-war Czechoslovakia.

Other examples of typical architecture are the Poruba district, which is under urban heritage protection of Ministry of the Culture of Czech Republic since 2003 thanks to its unique socialist realism style, and the Palace of Culture in the central Ostrava district.
