= Lubomír Linhart =

Lubomír Linhart (28 June 1906 – 10 June 1980) was a Czech film historian, critic, journalist, diplomat and photography theorist.

== Biography ==
Linhart was born in Prague in the family of an engineer. He began his journalistic career in the second half of the 1920s, focusing on film criticism and on the promotion of Soviet cinema. From 1926 he began to collaborate as a columnist with the communist magazines Reflektor and Tvorba. From 1927 he was a member of the Club for a New Film. From 1924 to 1934, he studied at the Czech Technical University in Prague. In 1927 he became the chief film correspondent of the Večerník Rudého práva, in 1928–1929 he collaborated with the daily Lidové Noviny and the magazine Filmový kurýr, in 1930 he was the film correspondent of the magazine Signál. In 1931–1932 he edited the film section of the newspaper Svoboda (Kladno). In the 1930s, Linhart was active in the Communist Party cultural association Left Front as a spokesperson and theorist for the Film-Photo group.

In 1930, he published his first book, Little Alphabet of Film. In 1931 and 1932, he travelled around the then Soviet Union, where he visited, for example, Ukrainian film studios in Kyiv and, together with Bedřich Václavek, participated in the Second International Conference of Proletarian Writers. In 1934, his book Social Photography was published by the Levá fronta publishing house.

After the German occupation of Czechoslovakia, Linhart became involved in the underground resistance. After the liberation of Czechoslovakia, he participated in the nationalization of the film industry and in 1948 he became the first general director of the nationalized Czechoslovak State Film. Later that year he was transferred in diplomatic work, serving as ambassador to Romania from 1948 to 1953 and the German Democratic Republic from 1953 to 1956.

After returning to Czechoslovakia, he was appointed professor at Film and TV School of the Academy of Performing Arts in Prague (FAMU) and the head of the department of film and television science. At the 2nd Congress of the Union of Czechoslovak Theatre and Film Artists, held from 30 March to 1 April 1961, he was elected to the central committee of this union and worked there until 1965. In 1969, he became head of the department of film science and criticism at the Department of Theatre Studies at the Faculty of Arts, Charles University.
