= Left Front (Czechoslovakia) =

The Left Front (Czech: Levá fronta) was an organization of left-wing intellectuals in Czechoslovakia, founded in 1929 on the initiative of the Communist Party of Czechoslovakia.

== History ==
Formed in 1930, which saw itself as the successor to the Devětsil Union of Modern Culture. The founding date was on October 18, 1929. On this day a general meeting of mainly members of Devětsil took place, in which some basic documents such as the programmatic statement of the new association were approved. The founding members were Karel Teige, Stanislav Kostka Neumann, Vítězslav Nezval, Bedřich Václavek, E.F. Burian, Vilém Závada, František Halas, Julius Fučík and later joined by Vladislav Vančura, Ivan Sekanina, Ladislav Štoll and others. The chairman of the newly found organisation became Zdeněk Nejedlý in 1932. The chosen name Levá fronta was a reference to the LEF in the Soviet Union.

The group was founded relatively quickly in other cities, first in Brno initiated by Jindřich Honzl and E. F. Burian; other local clubs emerged in 1931 in Boskovice, Žilina, Užhorod, Hradec králové and Ostrava.

Working sections soon emerged, specializing in various fields: the literary section, which was probably the most important, included doctors, philosophers, sociologists and economists. In 1931, Filmová a fotografická skupina (Film-Foto Group, also known as "fi-fo") was formed, prompted by film historian Lubomír Linhart who became its spokesman. The architects who founded their own section were particularly active – Architonická sekce Levé fronty (AsLeF, the Architectural Section of the LeF), initiated by Karel Teige and involved prominent architects such as Jaromír Krejcar, Jiří Kroha, Jiří Novotný and others. While the orientation towards poetism, later increasingly accompanied by epic elements, predominated in poetry, the active forces of the architecture section were first influenced by purism (in particular influenced by Le Corbusier), to later become protagonists of functionalism and above all of constructivism.

In its programmatic statement, Levá fronta described its goals, which was to propagate socialist culture and promote cooperation between the progressive intelligentsia and the working class. The statement also stated that the grouping was non-political and not linked to any political party, although as time went on, some aspects of the Levá fronta became more open about its connections and cooperation with the Communist Party of Czechoslovakia.

The activities of the organization ceased to exist in 1938.

== Journals and publications ==
Its eponymous journal Levá fronta, were among the best-known and driving forces of the Marxist-influenced artistic avant-garde of the 1920s and 1930s in Czechoslovakia.

In Prague it appeared from 1930 to 1933, the editor-in-chief was Stanislav Kostka Neumann. It was also published in Brno (1931), and the local group in Ostrava published its own Kampaň magazine. The journal devoted a lot of space to the question of Marxism, particularly from the perspective of the increasingly important struggle against fascism.

== See also ==
- LEF
