= František X. Halas =

Czech historian and diplomat (1937–2023)

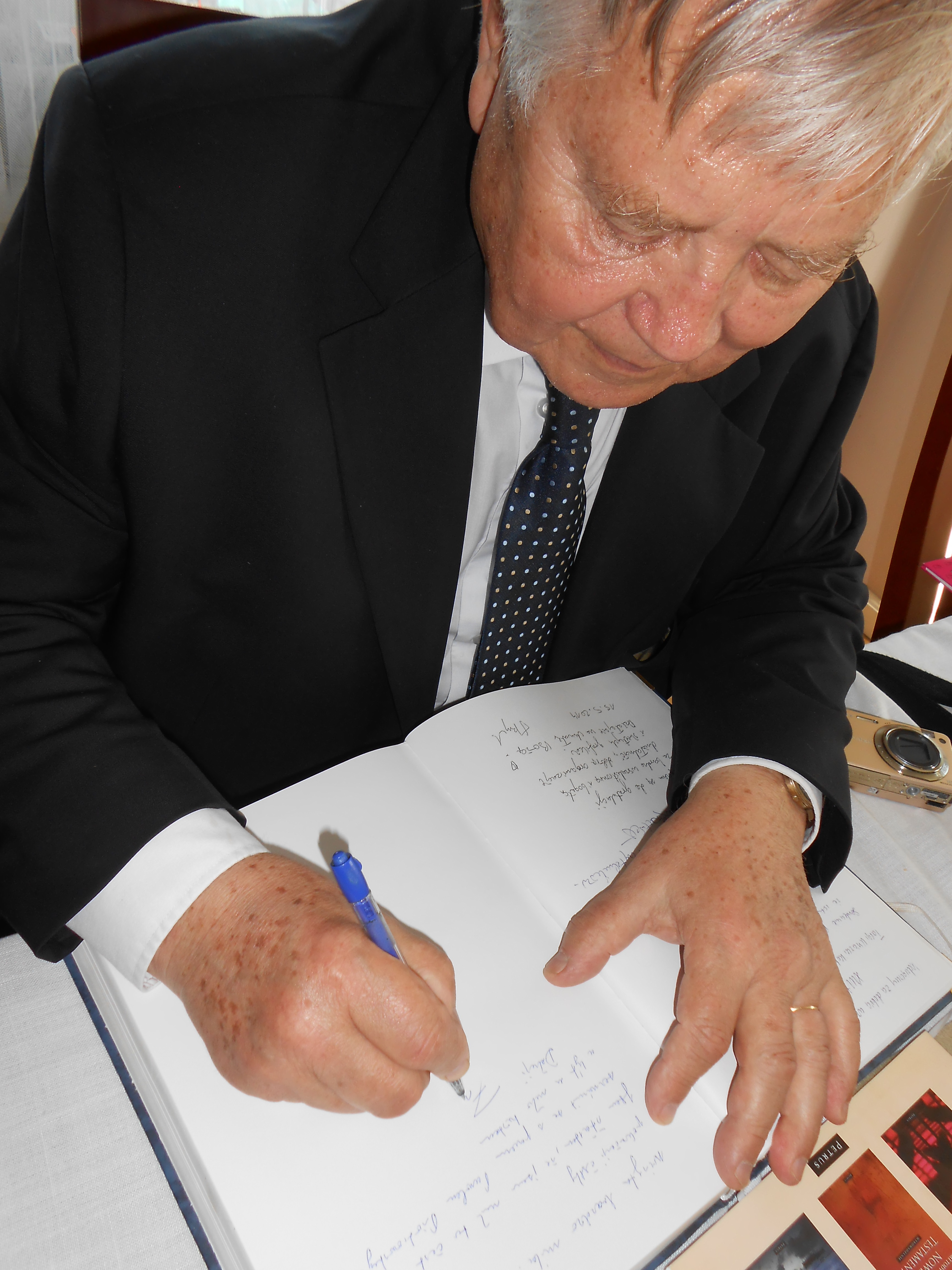
Halas in 2014

František Xaver Halas (18 October 1937 – 24 November 2023) was a Czech historian of Christianity, academic and diplomat. He was professor emeritus at the Cyril and Methodius Faculty of Theology at Palacký University Olomouc. He was the last ambassador of Czechoslovakia to the Holy See (1990–1993) and the first Czech ambassador to the Holy See (1993–1999). He was the son of the Czech poet František Halas. Halas died on 24 November 2023, at the age of 86.

== Publications ==
=== Monographs ===
- Venia docendi, Brno, Faculty of Arts UJEP 1982, 26 pp.
- Kontinuita a diskontinuita v českém měšťanském dějepisectví 1618–1648 (thesis)
- Soupis korespondence J. E. Purkyně, Prague, Academia 1987, 284 pp. (vyznamenáno cenou Českého literárního fondu za rok 1987)
- Co je Jeruzalémská bible a proč by se měl vydat její překlad do češtiny? Brno, Petrov 1991, 38 pp. (written 1982)
- Neklidné vztahy (k jednomu aspektu výročí 28. října 1918) Svitavy, Trinitas 1998, 101 pp. (113. svazek edice Studium - Křesťanská akademie Řím)
- Dějiny vztahů českého národa ke křesťanství (habilitační spis)
- Vztahy mezi státem a církví z hlediska jejich mezinárodního rozměru, Olomouc, CMTF UP, 2000, 72 pp., ISBN 80-244-0421-4
- Fenomén Vatikán – idea, dějiny a současnost papežství diplomacie Svatého stolce – České země a Vatikán, Centrum pro studium demokracie a kultury Brno 2004, 759 pp., ISBN 80-7325-034-9

=== Editor ===
(F. X. Halas, František Jordán) Dokumenty k dějinám Masarykovy univerzity v Brně, (edice), Brno, Masaryk University 1994, I.– 442 pp., 1995, II. – 354 pp.

=== Translations ===
F. X. Halas translated from French, mostly in collaboration with his wife Dagmar Halasová

- Julien Green, Každý ve své noci, Prague, Mladá fronta 1970
- Julien Green, Varuna, Prague, Vyšehrad 1970
- Paul Chauchard, Věda a smysl života, Prague, Vyšehrad 1971
- Jules Barbey d'Aurevilly, Rytíř Des Touches, Prague, Vyšehrad 1974
- G. Arpino, P. Lecaldano, Rembrandt, Prague, Odeon 1980
- Dora Vallier, Giovanni Artieri, Henri Rousseau, Prague, Odeon 1980
- R. Huyghe, P. Bianconi, Vermeer, Prague, Odeon 1981
- Marcel Pagnol, Živá voda, Prague, Odeon 1981
- P. Lecaldano, Vincent van Gogh, Prague, Odeon 1986
- Julien Green, Mont-Cinère, Prague, Odeon 1988
- Jean Guitton, Mlčení o podstatném, Brno, Petrov 1992
- Henri Grialou, Tvá láska rostla se mnou (sv. Terezie z Lisieux), Kostelní Vydří, Karmelitánské nakladatelství 1997
- Jeruzalémská bible (Svatá bible vydaná jeruzalémskou biblickou školou), I–XI, Prague, Krystal 1992–2008

F. X. Halas also translated several dozen shorter texts in the fields of fiction, history, art history and theology, which were published in magazines (theological journals for Czech version of Communio).
