= František Halas =

Czech poet, translator and politician

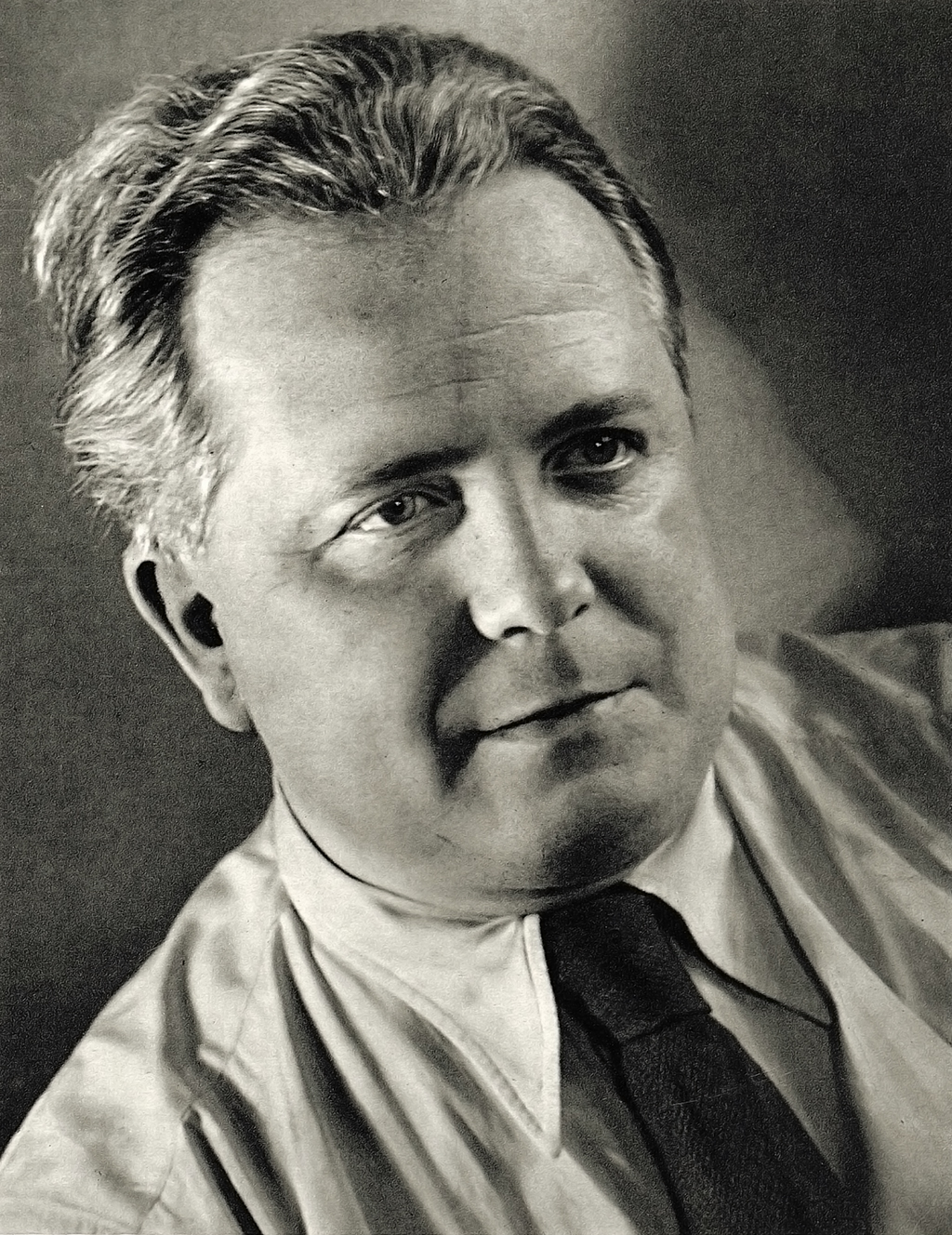
- František Halas in 1940
- Born: 3 October 1901; Brno, Austria-Hungary
- Died: 27 October 1949 (aged 48); Prague, Czechoslovakia
- Resting place: Kunštát
- Occupation: Poet
- Children: František Xaver Halas

František Halas (3 October 1901 – 27 October 1949) was a Czech poet, translator and politician. He was one of the most significant Czech lyric poets of the 20th century. His poor background influenced his work as well as his communist views and active involvement in politics.

== Life ==
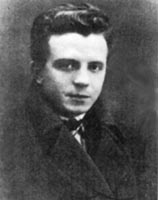
František Halas in 1923

František Halas was born on 3 October 1901 in Brno, into a family of textile workers. His father, František Sr., was the author of several memoirs. His mother died when he was eight, but his father remarried a few years later. In 1916–1919, he trained as a bookseller. He then worked in a bookstore until 1921. He replaced missing education with avid reading. Like his father, he was involved in the labour movement. His literary beginnings were contributions to the communist magazines Rovnost and Sršatec in 1921.

In 1923, Halas met Bedřich Václavek and together they founded the Brno branch of the Devětsil group of avant-garde artists. After a period of unemployment, work in an insurance company, and compulsory military service (1923–1925), he went to Paris for six months. In 1926, Halas became an editor at the Prague publishing house Orbis. He and Václavek anonymously published the communist satirical magazine Šlehy that year. Halas then became editor-in-chief of the magazines Orbis (1927–1928), Rozhledy (1935–1938) and Čteme (1938). From 1936 to 1942, he was in charge of the První knížka edition for young poets.

In the 1930s, Halas travelled to Italy, France, and Spain, which became an inspiration for his work upon his return. He married in 1936 to Libuše Rejlová (1908–1958), who was an art historian, and they had two sons: František Xaver (1937–2023), who became a diplomat, historian and translator, and Jan (1945–2010), who became a publicist and radio editor.

Halas was an active communist. During World War II, he was active in the resistance movement. He wrote for Rudé právo, which was an illegal press during the war. After 1945, he worked at the Ministry of Information, and became a member of the Interim National Assembly of Czechoslovakia for the Communist Party of Czechoslovakia in 1945–1946.

During World War II, Halas lived and worked in Kunštát, a market town near Rozseč nad Kunštátem (the village where his family came from). During the war, he was being treated for heart disease. He died of heart failure on 27 October 1949 in Prague, at the age of 48. He was buried in Kunštát.

== Work ==
Halas is best known as a poet. He ranks among the most important Czech poets of the 20th century. Most of his poems have a strong social overtone, which was caused by his growing up in poor conditions. His work reflected the chaos after World War I and before World War II, but it also contains lyric poems that are tender and intimate. His poems are considered simple and understandable. In modern times, his poetic work for children is best known.

Halas translated poetry by foreign authors into Czech. During World War II, he translated works by Polish authors Juliusz Słowacki and Adam Mickiewicz. After the war, he translated Alexander Pushkin's fairy tales in verse, the work of the Hungarian poet Endre Ady, and other.

In addition to poetry, Halas wrote essays on poetry and the visual arts, and collaborated with film by writing songs and libretti.

=== Collections of poetry ===
- Sepie (1927)
- Kohout plaší smrt (1930)
- Tvář (1931)
- Hořec (1933)
- Dělnice (1934)
- Staré ženy (1935)
- Dokořán (1936)
- Torzo naděje (1938)
- Naše paní Božena Němcová (1940)
- Ladění (1942)
- Já se tam vrátím (1947)
- V řadě (1948)

== Honours ==
Halasovo náměstí (Halas Square) in the Lesná district of Brno is named after František Halas. Several cities and towns in the Czech Republic have a street named after Halas, including Prague (Krč), Ostrava, Liberec and Jihlava.

In 1945, Halas became the first Honorary Citizen of Kunštát. The Kunštát Municipal Information Centre houses the Memorial Hall of Poets František Halas and Klement Bochořák with a permanent exhibition on their lives and work. Every year in October, the cultural event Halas' Kunštát with poetry readings takes place in Kunštát.
