= Jiří Kroha =

Czech architect, designer, painter, sculptor and university educator (1893–1974)

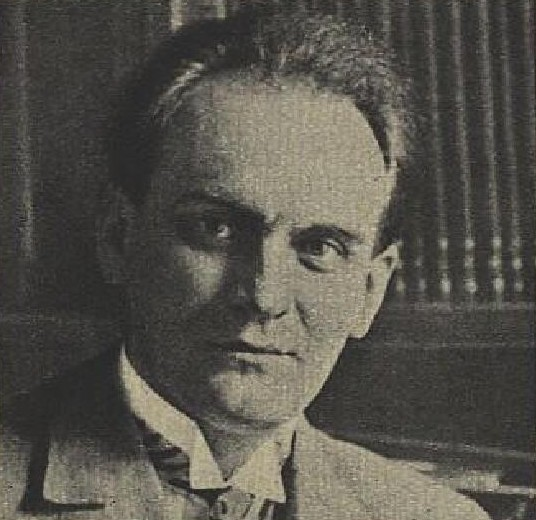
- Jiří Kroha in 1931
- Born: 5 June 1893; Bubeneč, Bohemia, Austria-Hungary
- Died: 7 June 1974 (aged 81); Prague, Czechoslovakia
- Resting place: Brno Central Cemetery
- Education: Czech Technical University in Prague
- Movement: Bauhaus, Constructivism, functionalism, Socialist realism

Jiří Kroha (5 June 1893 – 7 June 1974) was a Czech architect, painter, sculptor, scenographer, designer and pedagogue. He was an important exponent of Czech architecture and design during inter-war period.

== Biography ==
Kroha was born on 5 June 1893 in Bubeneč, Bohemia, Austria-Hungary (today part of Prague, Czech Republic). He began his studies in Prague, but in 1904 his family moved to Plzeň. From 1907 to 1909 he gained his first experience with theatre, as a member of amateur cabaret group. In 1911, he graduated from realschule in Plzeň. The same year he began to study at the Czech Technical University in Prague. Among his professors were Jan Koula, Josef Fanta, Antonín Balšánek and Rudolf Kříženecký. In 1918 he successfully finished his studies at the Czech Technical University.

At the same time he made first contacts with bohemian group of the cabaret Montmartre from Řetězová Street in Prague. Among regular guests of the performances were Jaroslav Hašek, Max Brod, Franz Kafka, Eduard Bass, Eduard Bass, Konstantin Biebl, Egon Erwin Kisch, Vítězslav Nezval, Karel Teige and others. In 1918 Kroha became a member of the Mánes Union of Fine Arts, and he also began his collaboration with Artěl (Atelier for Art Work in Prague).

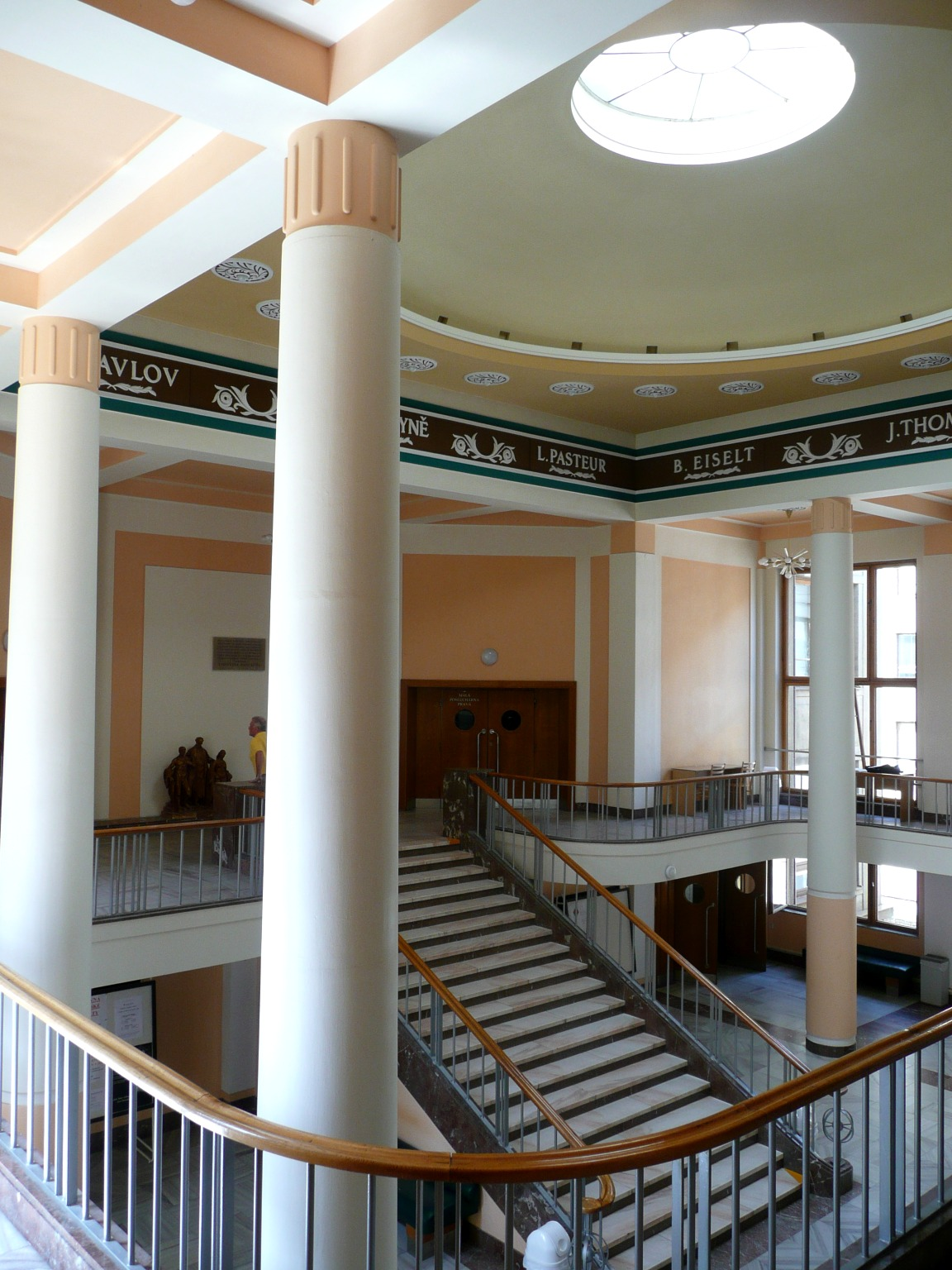
Vestibule of Faculty of Medicine and Dentistry of Palacký University in Olomouc, designed by Jiří Kroha and Václav Roštlapil, 1950–1952

In 1921 Kroha married Miroslava Kubátová. Their daughter Sylva was born in 1926.

In the 1920s he designed several buildings in Mladá Boleslav and Kosmonosy. His building of Secondary Industrial School in Mladá Boleslav is a valuable architectural work, protected as a national cultural monument. In 1926 he began lecturing at the Brno University of Technology, and two years later, in 1928, he moved to Brno with his family.

From 1926 he began lecturing at the Brno University of Technology and in 1928 he moved with his family to Brno. He became close with Bedřich Václavek and joined the Left Front and the Society for Cultural and Economic Convergence with Soviet Russia. In 1930 he was appointed full professor of Brno technology. He completed a six-week trip to the Soviet Union. Upon his return, he embarked on intense political activity. From 1932 to 1933, he was chairman of the Committee for the Support of Families of Striking Miners in the Rosice–Oslavany region.

In 1935, he was sent into permanent retirement for his left-wing public lectures, in which he attacked the existing state institution as a civil servant. In 1937 he was allowed to lecture again.

After the Nazi invasion of Czechoslovakia he was arrested by the Gestapo for his Communist activities and was only released for his declining health with the request of the International Red Cross. He was under intense surveillance for the remainder of the Second World War.

After the liberation of Czechoslovakia, he embarked on intense political and architectural activities. From 1945 to 1948 he was again the dean of the Department of Architecture and Civil Engineering of the University of Technology in Brno, in 1948 he was appointed rector of the university. His Studio of the National Artist (ANU) Jiří Kroha (later the Master Studio of the National Artist – MANU) worked on housing construction projects and propaganda installations of exhibitions and political events. The studio was dissolved in 1956. He has received a number of state and artistic awards for his work after 1948.

He died in 1974 in Prague.
