= Jarmila Bělíková =

Czech psychologist, activist, and translator (1948–2010)

Jarmila Bělíková (April 27, 1948 – May 6, 2010) was a Czech psychologist, activist, and translator.

She was born in Brno. She studied medicine and during the 1970s worked in a treatment centre for female alcoholics. She then worked as a social worker specializing in the Roma issue.

Bělíková was a signer of Charter 77 and a founder of VONS, the committee for the defence of the unjustly accused. In May 1979, she was arrested and imprisoned for seven months under the communist regime in Czechoslovakia. She returned to work as a psychologist in 1989.

During the 1980s, with Olga Havlová, she established an association that published dissident books.

In 2001, she was awarded the Czech Medal of Merit.

Bělíková died in Prague at the age of 62.
