= Čáslavice =

- Municipality
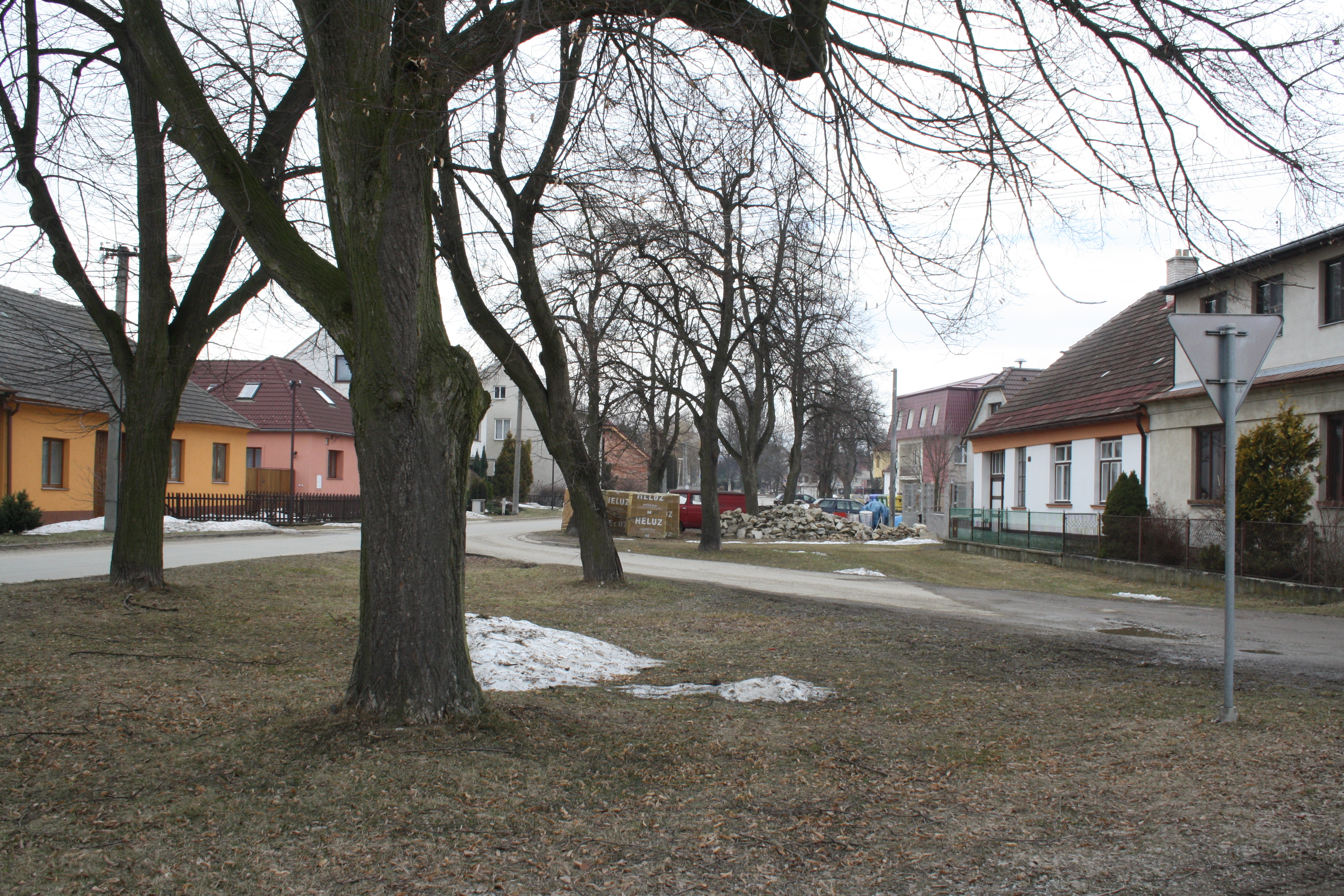
- Centre of Čáslavice

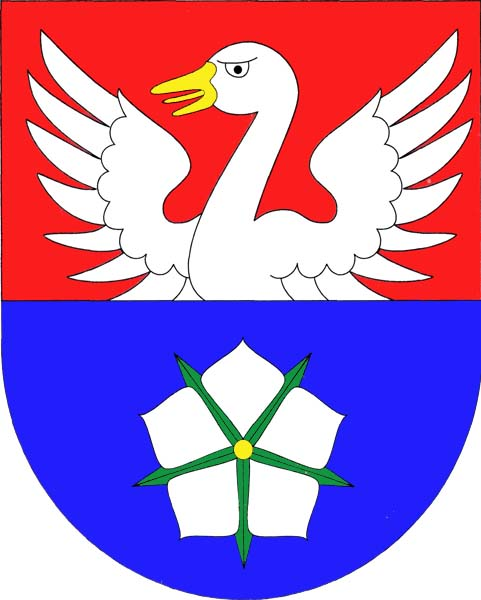
- Flag Coat of arms

- Location in the Czech Republic
- Coordinates: 49°9′8″N 15°46′21″E
- Country: Czech Republic
- Region: Vysočina
- District: Třebíč
- First mentioned: 1240

Area
  - Total: 10.18 km^{2} (3.93 sq mi)
- Elevation: 510 m (1,670 ft)

Population (2026-01-01)
  - Total: 560
  - Density: 55/km^{2} (140/sq mi)
- Time zone: UTC+1 (CET)
  - Summer (DST): UTC+2 (CEST)
- Postal code: 675 24
- Website: www.caslavice.cz

Čáslavice is a municipality and village in Třebíč District in the Vysočina Region of the Czech Republic. It has about 600 inhabitants.

== Geography ==
Čáslavice is located about 10 kilometres (6 mi) southwest of Třebíč and 30 km (19 mi) southeast of Jihlava. Most of the municipal territory lies in the Jevišovice Uplands, only the western part lies in the Křižanov Highlands. The highest point is at 635 m (2,083 ft) above sea level. There are several fishponds in the municipality.

== History ==
The first written mention of Čáslavice is in a deed of the Porta coeli Convent from 1240. It was most likely founded at the turn of the 12th and 13th centuries at the latest. The village was first part of the Rokštejn estate. At the beginning of the 15th century, the village was bought by the Waldstein family and became part of the Sádek estate. The Waldsteins owned Čáslavice until 1676, when they sold it to the Waldorf family.

In 1708, most of Čáslavice was destroyed by a large fire. The village recovered and in 1864, it was promoted to a market town. However, it later lost the title.

== Demographics ==
Historical population

Year	Pop.	±%
1869	679	—
1880	726	+6.9%
1890	791	+9.0%
1900	817	+3.3%
1910	851	+4.2%

Year	Pop.	±%
1921	885	+4.0%
1930	822	−7.1%
1950	717	−12.8%
1961	776	+8.2%
1970	718	−7.5%

Year	Pop.	±%
1980	687	−4.3%
1991	639	−7.0%
2001	578	−9.5%
2011	516	−10.7%
2021	529	+2.5%

Source: Censuses

== Transport ==
There are no railways or major roads passing through the municipality.

== Sights ==
The main landmark of the village is the Church of the Saint Martin. It is an early Gothic building from the 13th century, surrounded by fortifications in the form of ramparts and ditches.

The Sádek Castle was originally an early Gothic castle, founded on a hill near Čáslavice before 1286. In the 16th century, it was rebuilt into a representative Renaissance residence.

== Notable people ==
- Bedřich Václavek (1897–1943), literary theorist, critic and journalist
