= Committee for the Defense of the Unjustly Prosecuted =

Czechoslovak dissident organization

The Committee for the Defense of the Unjustly Prosecuted (Czech: Výbor na obranu nespravedlivě stíhaných, VONS) was a Czechoslovak dissident organization founded largely by Charter 77 signatories. VONS was founded on 27 April 1978.

== Founding and political aims ==
VONS was founded on 27 April 1978. Seventeen Czechoslovak dissents and activists co-founded VONS and are named in the organization's founding 1978 declaration: Rudolf Battěk, Otta Bednářová, Jarmila Bělíková, Václav Benda, Jiří Dienstbier, Václav Havel, Přemysl Janýr, Elzbieta Ledererová, Václav Malý, Ivan Medek, Dana Němcová, Ludvík Pacovský, Jiří Ruml, Gertruda Sekaninová-Čakrtová, Anna Šabatová, Jan Tesař, and Petr Uhl.

The Committee for the Defense of the Unjustly Prosecuted sought to support dissidents and their families. VONS also wanted to educate the general public about the plight of dissidents. VONS was largely, if not completely, founded by Charter 77 signatories. However, it was largely independent from Charter 77.

== Work ==
The organization also became a member of the International Federation for Human Rights, under the name Czechoslovak League for Human Rights. VONS also cooperated with human rights organizations such as Amnesty International and Helsinki Watch. Many of the founders, such as Václav Havel, became involved in politics after the 1989 Velvet Revolution.

== Government's reaction ==
Shortly after the founding of VONS, Václav Havel and five other representatives of the organizations were arrested and sentenced to two to five years in prison. Many of the members of the Committee were persecuted by StB (Czechoslovak secret police).
