= Ivan Sekanina =

Czech attorney and publicist

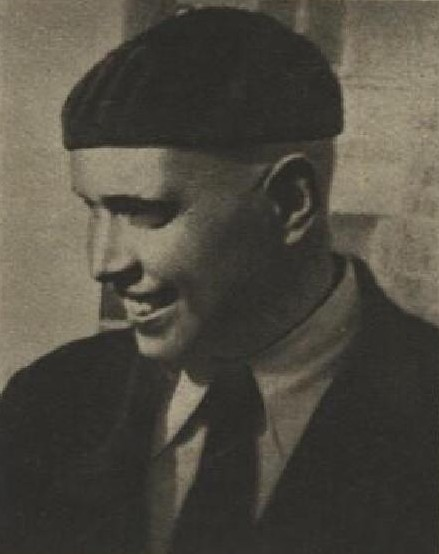
- Born: October 31, 1900; Nové Město na Moravě, Austria-Hungary
- Died: May 21, 1940 (aged 39); Sachsenhausen concentration camp
- Occupations: Lawyer, journalist
- Political party: Communist Party of Czechoslovakia
- Spouse: Gertruda Sekaninová-Čakrtová
- Father: František Sekanina
- Awards: Order of the White Lion

Ivan Sekanina (31 October 1900 – 21 May 1940) was a Czechoslovak communist politician, lawyer, journalist and resistance fighter.

== Biography ==
Ivan Sekanina was born in to the family of the Moravian teacher and poet František Sekanina.

From 1919 to 1923, he studied at the Faculty of Law of Charles University, and at first he was quite close to the Czech National Socialist Party. Later, inspired by his friends, the politician Bohuslav Vrbenský and the poet Jiří Wolker, he leaned towards the left. He joined the Communist Party of Czechoslovakia in 1925, offered the party his legal services and became a legal representative of the Communist Party and Rudé právo.

Sekanina was a close collaborator with other Czech and Slovak Communist activists and intellectuals such as Julius Fučík, Václav Kopecký, Vladimír Clementis and Jan Šverma. 1933, Gertruda Stassiny, whom he married in 1935, began working in his office. From 1938 they ran their office together.

He became a prominent defender of accused workers and communists. He was heavily involved in the staged trial of Georgi Dimitrov and his comrades, accused in 1933 of setting fire to the Reichstag. He was originally supposed to become the defense attorney for the co-accused chairman of the parliamentary faction Ernst Torgler in the Leipzig trial, but the Reich did not allow it.

In the 1930s, he was a co-founder and functionary of many left-wing and anti-fascist organizations, such as the Society for Economic and Cultural Rapprochement with the USSR, the Left Front, the Union of Friends of the USSR, the Committee for Aid to Democratic Spain, the League for Human Rights, the Šalda Committee, the Socialist Academy and the D 34 theatre. In 1938, he became one of the organizers of the petition action in the Czech Republic for intelligentsia to defend the republic against Hitler's aggression "We will remain faithful". Together with the philosopher and sociologist Josef Fischer, he conceived the definitive text of this patriotic and anti-fascist appeal.

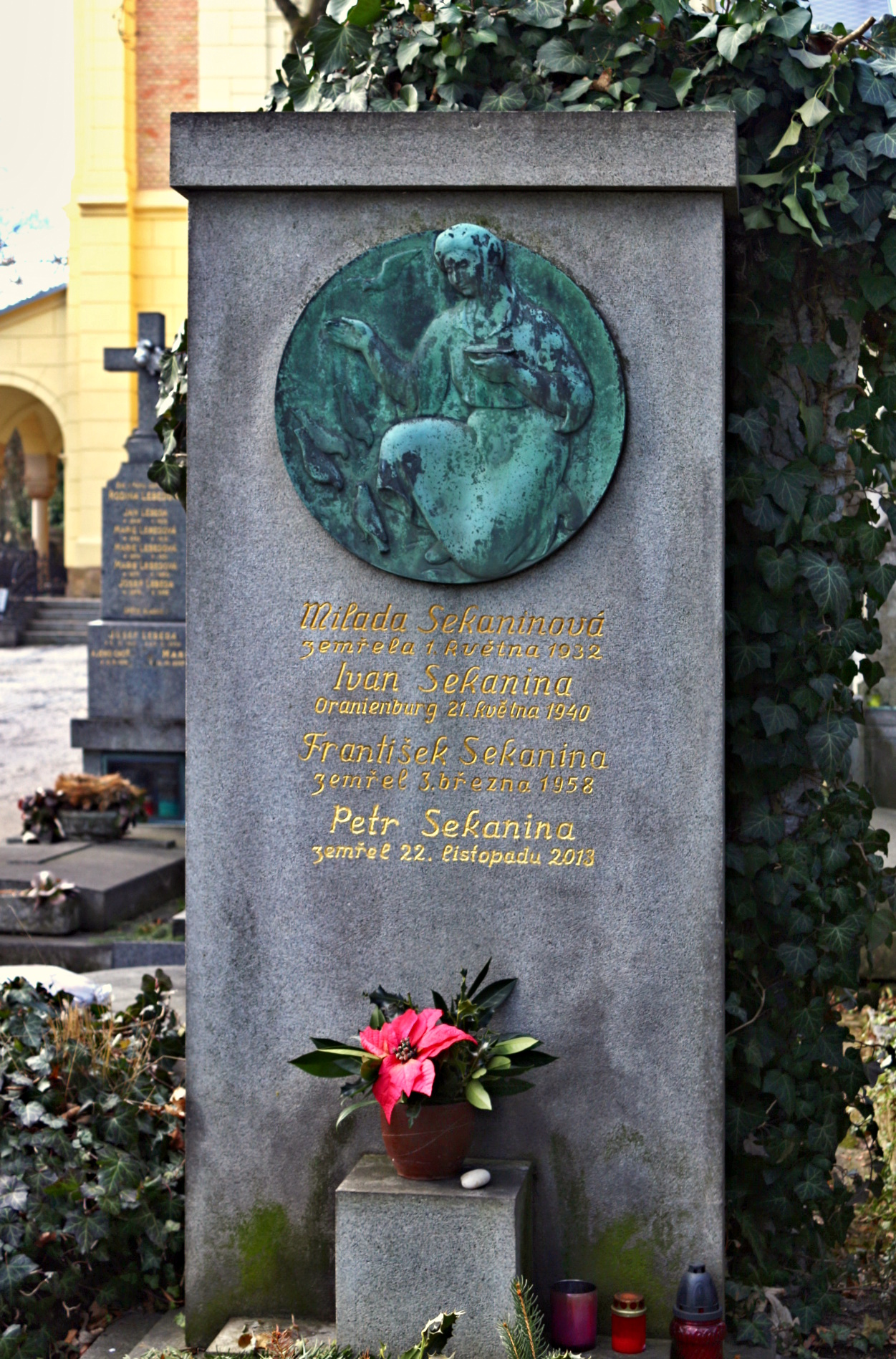
Tombstone of the Sekanina at the Malvazinky cemetery in Prague

He was arrested immediately after the invasion of the Nazis on 16 March 1939. He was first imprisoned in Pankrác, later he was transferred to Berlin, where a political trial was being prepared for him. After the outbreak of World War II, Sekanina was deported to Sachsenhausen concentration camp, where he died on 21 May 1940, possibly under torture. He converted to the Catholic faith before his death.

In 1949, Ivan Sekanina was awarded the Order of the White Lion in memoriam. Tombstone of the Sekanina family is located at the Malvazinky cemetery in Prague.
