= Gertruda Sekaninová-Čakrtová =

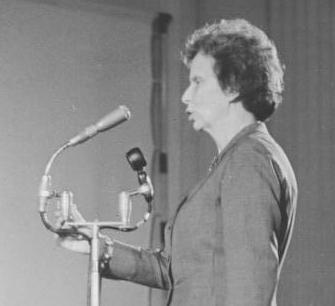
Gertruda Sekaninová-Čakrtová in 1963.

Gertruda Sekaninová-Čakrtová, born Stiassny (21 May 1908, Budapest – 29 December 1986, Jihlava) was a Czech and Czechoslovak lawyer, politician and diplomat of Jewish origin, later also a dissident and signatory of the Charter 77. She is most renowned for being one of the four deputies of the National Assembly of the Czechoslovak Socialist Republic who voted against the agreement on the temporary stay of Soviet troops in Czechoslovakia in the fall of 1968, following the Warsaw Pact invasion of Czechoslovakia.

== Early years, before World War II ==
She was born in 1908 in Budapest (then Austro-Hungarian Empire), as Gertruda Stiassny, to a wealthy Jewish family. She was the eldest of four children. Her parents, Richard and Alžběta Stiassny, moved to Hungary from Bohemia to manage family textile manufacture. Her father died when she was 12 years old. One of her brothers was Josef "Pepek" Stiassny (Joseph "Joe" Stiassny) (1916-1944), who later became known as a guardian and tutor of boys in the Theresienstadt Ghetto, where he contributed to the magazine Vedem. In 1910, the family moved back to Havlíčkův (then German) Brod, where Gertrude studied and graduated from gymnasium (1922–1927). She continued her studies at the Law Faculty of Charles University in Prague. During her studies she began collaborating with leftist students and worked in various left-wing organizations (Society for the Economic and Social Rapprochement with the USSR, Kostufra, Syndicate of Working Women Intelligence etc.). In 1932, she joined the Communist Party of Czechoslovakia. In the same year she graduated and began working as a clerk in the law office of Dr. Ivan Sekanina, whom she married in 1935. In 1938, she passed the bar exam and began practicing law. As an advocate, she took part in the international processes with representatives of the left-wing.

Ivan Sekanina was known, among other things, as an advocate of Ernst Torgler and Georgi Dimitrov, accused of igniting the German Reichstag, which earned him the hatred of Nazis. On 16 March 1939, the day after Germans started the occupation of Czechoslovakia, Ivan Sekanina was arrested. He was executed in Sachsenhausen on 21 May 1940, on the day of 32nd birthday of his wife.

== World War II ==
After the arrest of her husband, she continued to practice law. She was forced to quit in 1940, due to the enhanced application of the Nuremberg Laws in the Protectorate of Bohemia and Moravia. Then she worked as a nurse in children's shelters. In October 1942, she was transported to the Theresienstadt Ghetto. She worked as a governess of teenaged Geltungsjude girls.

In 1944, she was deported to Auschwitz, where she was selected for forced labor in Kurzbach (a branch of the Gross-Rosen concentration camp). On 21 January 1945, the camp was evacuated due to the approaching Red Army. She left the camp in a death march heading toward the concentration camp at Bergen-Belsen. She managed to escape, along with several other prisoners. She was liberated by the U.S. Army in Regis-Breitingen after several months of hiding as forced laborer in Saxony. Most of her extended family perished during the Holocaust.

== Activities in post-war Czechoslovakia ==
After the war, she worked at the Ministry of Foreign Affairs and as a permanent delegate of Czechoslovakia to the United Nations. The 8th Congress of the Communist Party selected her as a member of the Central Committee of the Communist Party of Czechoslovakia (ÚV KSČ). She worked in the Central Committee until 1949. After returning from the USA in 1949, she became the First Deputy of the Minister of Foreign Affairs, Vladimír Clementis. She married a second time in 1948, this time to Kazimír Čakrt, who worked at the Ministry of Finance. They had one son, Michal Čakrt (born in 1948).

Sekaninová-Čakrtová escaped the party purges, although according to historians she exactly fell into the category of hidden class enemies, classified by the Soviet advisors (she was Jewish and of bourgeois origin, well educated and had close personal connections to persons prosecuted in political processes). It is possible that friendship with many officials of the regime whom she had known from the pre-war period helped her. In 2013, it became known that at that time she had to give up the property inherited from her parents, under the threat of persecutions. In 1957, she and her husband were investigated for alleged espionage and financial fraud committed by a cousin of her husband, Jan Čakrt. These fabricated charges resulted in suicide of her husband. According to another version, Kazimír Čakrt was arrested at the request of the Finance Minister Július Ďuriš, who believed that Čakrt helped Austrian delegation during the negotiations about financial and legal settlement between Czechoslovakia and Austria after the war. After the suicide of her husband, Sekaninová-Čakrtová was removed from office and later worked at the Ministry of Education as head of the newly established legislative and administrative department.

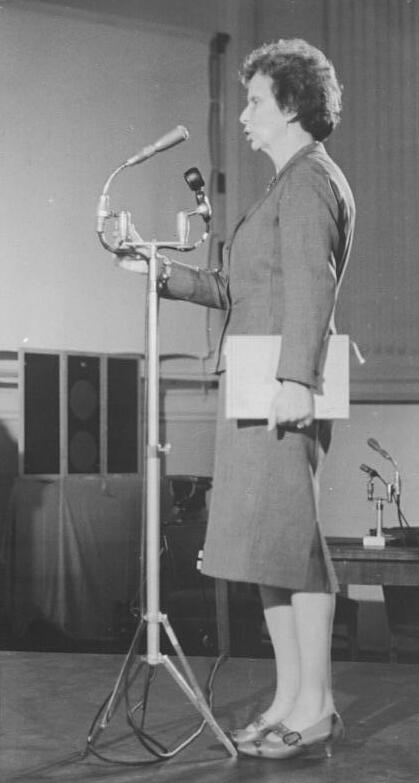
Sekaninová-Čakrtová testified in the 1963 process with a co-author of the Nuremberg Laws, Hans Globke.

As a former concentration camp inmate, she testified in the 1963 process with a co-author of the Nuremberg Laws, Hans Globke.

In the elections held in 1964, she returned to politics as a member of the National Assembly. She supported the draft bill excluding statute of limitations for war crimes committed during the World War II. During the Prague Spring, she supported the abolition of censorship.

From 1968 to 1969, she served as Vice-President of the Czechoslovak Union of Women.

In April 1968, she was awarded the Order of the Republic.

== After 1968 ==
During 1968, Sekaninová-Čakrtová gradually started to grow disillusioned with the communist ideology and politics. After the Soviet invasion of Czechoslovakia in August 1968, she voted as one of the four members of the National Assembly against the agreement on the temporary stay of Soviet troops in Czechoslovakia and suggested their complete withdrawal from Czechoslovak territory (the other deputies were František Kriegel, František Vodsloň and Božena Fuková). Because of these attitudes, she was, along with other rebelling members of the National Assembly, deprived of their mandate and expelled from the Communist Party.

She spent the rest of her life working in dissent. She signed Charter 77, was involved in the Committee for the Defense of the Unjustly Persecuted and supported the persecuted musicians from the band The Plastic People of the Universe. For her attitude she was harassed by State Security (StB). She was labelled by the State Security as "... a person with hostility directed against the Soviet Union ... she does not accept the leadership of the Central Committee of the Communist Party and with her conduct she attempts to undermine the positive results of internal and foreign policy of Czechoslovakia."

Sekaninová-Čakrtová spent her later years in Polná near Jihlava. She died in 1986 in Jihlava, due to injury. Shortly before her death, the StB noted: "Her attitudes towards real socialism remain hostile ...".
