= Otta Bednářová =

Czech journalist (1927–2023)

- Born: 18 June 1927; Prague, Czechoslovakia
- Died: 5 September 2023 (aged 96); Prague, Czech Republic
- Occupations: Journalist, writer, screenwriter, dissident
- Known for: Committee for the Defense of the Unjustly Prosecuted (VONS)
- Children: Jiří Bednář; Jan Bednář
- Awards: Order of Tomáš Garrigue Masaryk (1997)

Otta Bednářová (née Šmirousová; 18 June 1927 – 5 September 2023) was a Czech journalist, writer, screenwriter, television producer and dissident during Czechoslovakia's communist era. She was an early Charter 77 signatory in 1976 and co-founded the Committee for the Defense of the Unjustly Prosecuted (VONS) in 1978. She was imprisoned for more than one year for her opposition to communist rule.

== Biography ==
Bednářová was born in Prague, Czechoslovakia, on 18 June 1927, the eldest of three daughters of Otylie and Karel Šmirous. She was raised in the village of Všenory near Prague. The family moved to the Kobylisy district of Prague when she was ten years old. During the Nazi occupation of Czechoslovakia, her father secretly listened to foreign radio broadcasts, despite fear of arrest. Bednářová lived close to the 1942 Kobylisy Shooting Range massacre and her family helped to extinguish a house fire following the killing of twelve members of a neighboring family. Despite the threats posed by the Nazis, Bednářová's family survived World War II.

She joined the Communist Party after graduation from high school and found a job at ČKD, an engineering company. In 1950, she was hired as a journalist by Czechoslovak Radio, where she began investigative reporting of the working conditions of Czechoslovak women. She also focused on agricultural and social issues, which included some criticism of the communist government and other sensitive topics. Her colleagues at the radio station included the writers Ludvík Vaculík and Arnošt Lustig.

In 1963, she was hired by Czechoslovak Television as a journalist, producer, and screenwriter.< She co-created the investigative television show, Zvědavá kamera ("Curious Camera"), and also served as the editor and screenwriter. During the 1960s, as Czechoslovak authorities relaxed some media restrictions, Bednářová was able to focus on topics that would have not been permitted in the 1940s and 1950s. For example, she investigated why certain elementary schools only admitted students whose parents were members of the communist party.

In 1968, her show, Curious Camera, was cancelled and its editors dismissed following the Prague Spring and the Warsaw Pact invasion of Czechoslovakia. Bednářová was fired from her job at Czechoslovak Television and expelled from the Communist Party of Czechoslovakia. She and her sons moved to Austria in September 1968 before later returning to Czechoslovakia.

Beginning in 1974, Bednářová began reproducing and distributing Samizdat publications. She produced banned books by Karel Kaplan and Ludvík Vaculík, her former colleague at Radio Czechoslovak. She also distributed the Listy magazine, which included works by Jiří Pelikán that were smuggled into Czechoslovakia. This drew the attention of the StB, the communist Czechoslovakia secret police, who began monitoring her activities.

Bednářová became an early signatory of the Charter 77 declaration in 1976 and encouraged her two sons to sign it as well. She was arrested by the StB for the first time shortly after signing Charter 77 and held in Pankrác Prison.

In 1978, Bednářová joined with sixteen other Charter 77 signatories to create the Committee for the Defense of the Unjustly Prosecuted (VONS). Bednářová and her colleagues founded VONS to defend Czechoslovak citizens who were arrested or persecuted for their political and personal beliefs. In May 1979, the StB secret police arrested Bednářová and nine other founding VONS members. Bednářová was held in custody for four months before being sentenced to three years in prison without probation. She served sixteen months of her sentence before being released. She quickly returned to her work distributing samizdat publications once she was freed.

On 17 November 1989, Bednářová took part in a march commemorating the 50th anniversary of the Czechoslovak universities by the Nazis. Although the march had been permitted by authorities, it was violently dispersed by public security forces, starting the Velvet Revolution. Bednářová was beaten by police.

Following the Velvet Revolution and the fall of communism, Bednářová worked in the Committee of Good Will of Olga Havlová. President Václav Havel awarded her the Order of Tomáš Garrigue Masaryk, class III, for services to democracy and human rights in October 1997. She also received a commendation for her participation in the resistance to communism in September 2014.

Otta Bednářová died at a hospital in Prague's Vinohrady district on 5 September 2023, at the age of 96.
