= Rozseč (Žďár nad Sázavou District) =

- Municipality
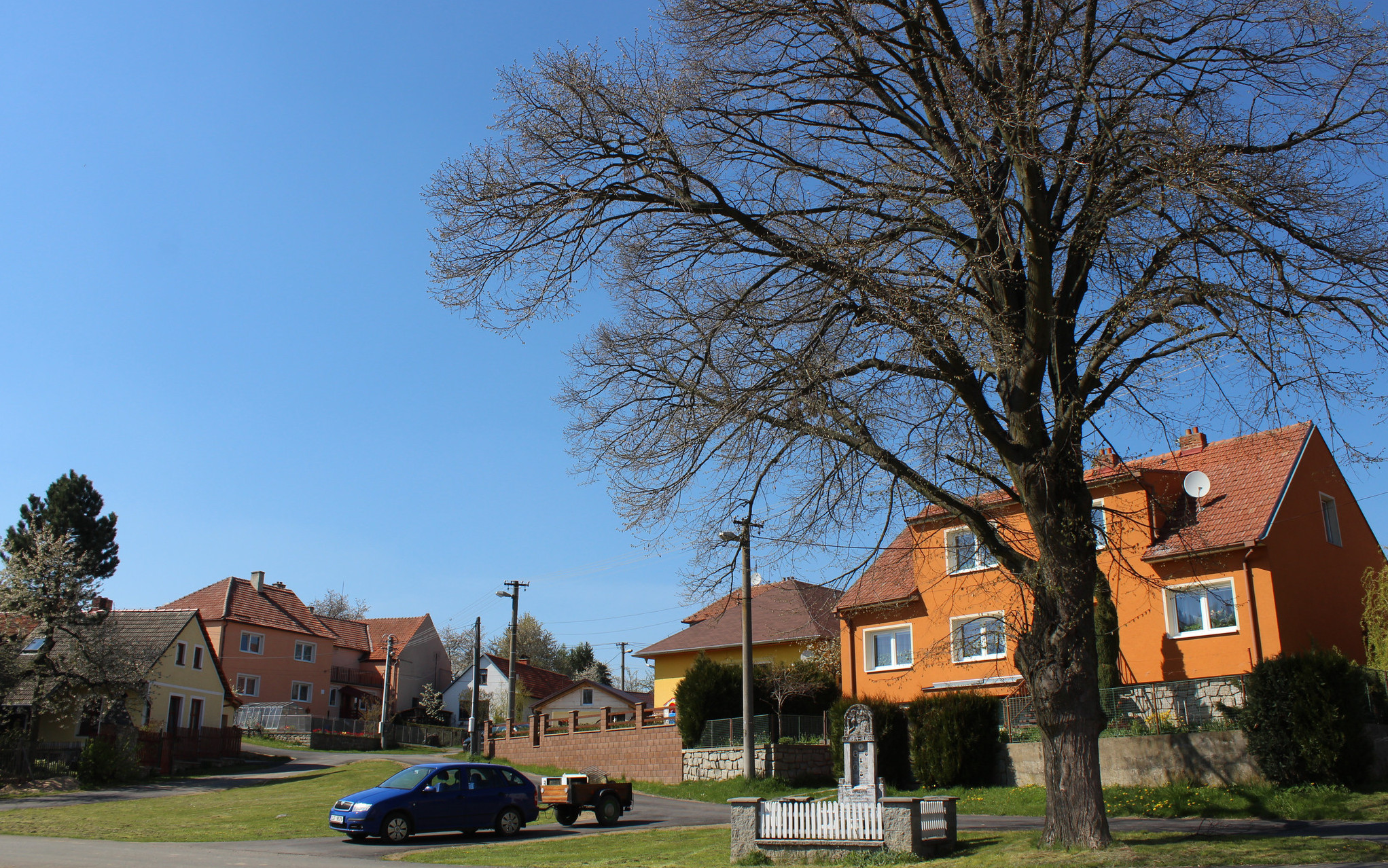
- Centre of Rozseč

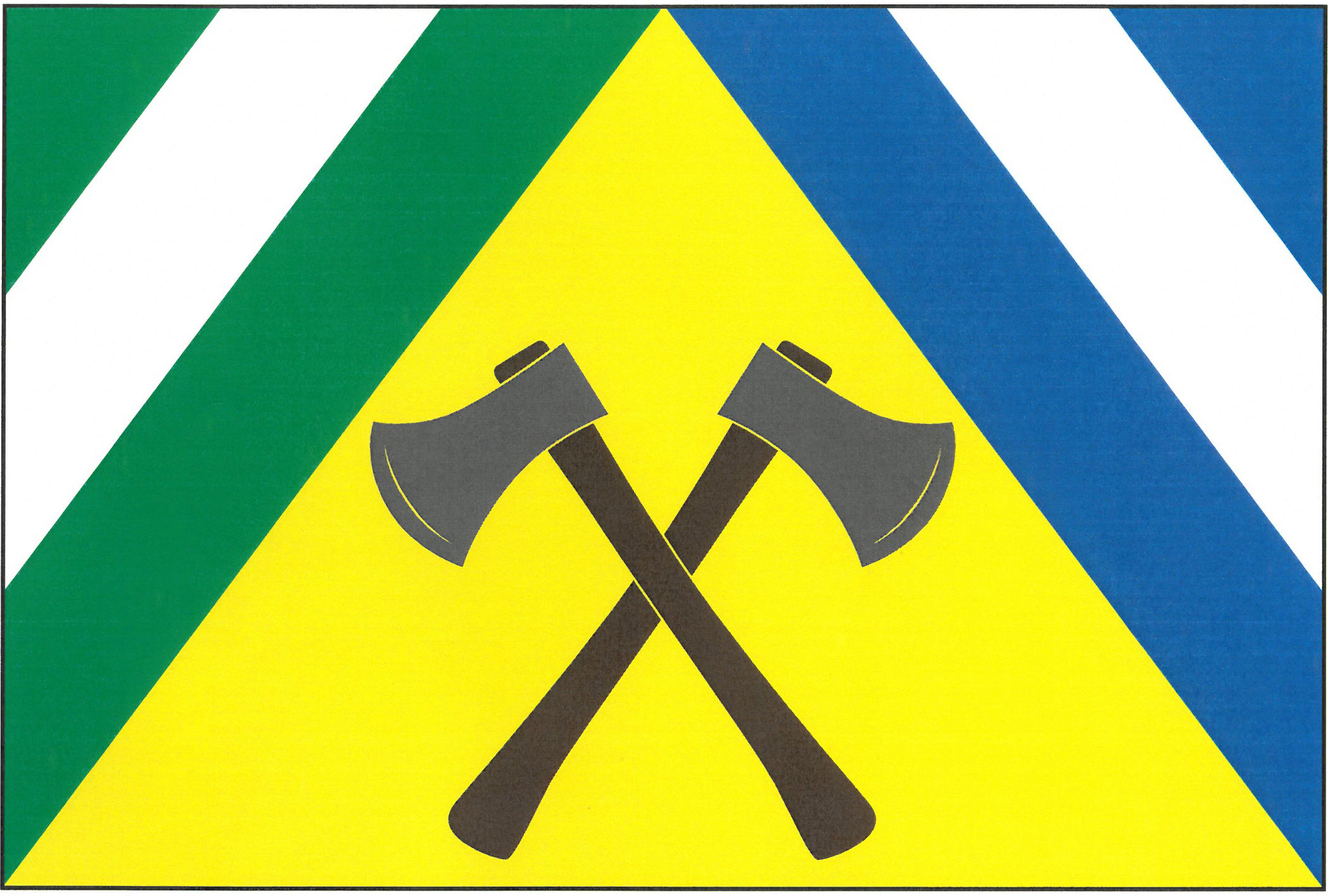
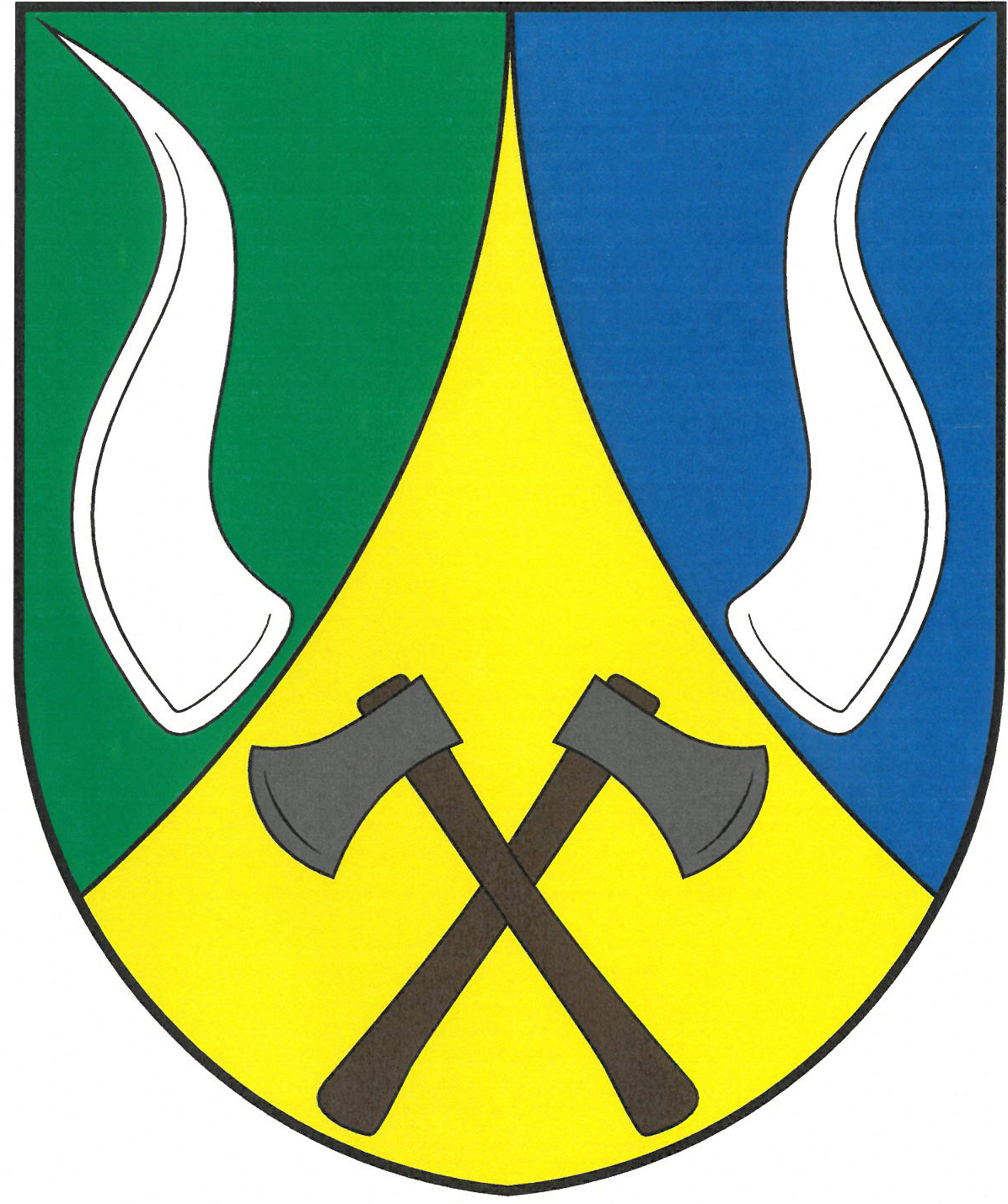
- Flag Coat of arms

- Location in the Czech Republic
- Coordinates: 49°21′37″N 16°13′10″E
- Country: Czech Republic
- Region: Vysočina
- District: Žďár nad Sázavou
- First mentioned: 1349

Area
  - Total: 2.02 km^{2} (0.78 sq mi)
- Elevation: 494 m (1,621 ft)

Population (2026-01-01)
  - Total: 93
  - Density: 46/km^{2} (120/sq mi)
- Time zone: UTC+1 (CET)
  - Summer (DST): UTC+2 (CEST)
- Postal code: 594 51
- Website: www.rozsec.com

Rozseč is a municipality and village in Žďár nad Sázavou District in the Vysočina Region of the Czech Republic. It has about 90 inhabitants.

Rozseč lies approximately 30 kilometres (19 mi) south-east of Žďár nad Sázavou, 46 km (29 mi) east of Jihlava, and 153 km (95 mi) south-east of Prague.

== Demographics ==
Historical population
Year	Pop.	±%
1869	179	—
1880	180	+0.6%
1890	174	−3.3%
1900	176	+1.1%
1910	155	−11.9%
1921	151	−2.6%
1930	150	−0.7%
1950	129	−14.0%
1961	114	−11.6%
1970	111	−2.6%
1980	129	+16.2%
1991	121	−6.2%
2001	114	−5.8%
2011	91	−20.2%
2021	87	−4.4%
Source: Censuses
