= Paul Chauchard =

French physician

Paul Chauchard (14 June 1912 – 27 April 2003) was a French physician and writer of about 80 books. President of laissez-les-vire for 20 years.

== Biography ==
Physician and scientist, he was professor at the Institut Catholique de Paris (ICP) and the École pratique des hautes études .

On 1970 he became the first president of the movement Laissez-les-vivre.

He was father of 6 girls, one of them is a religious member of Cistercians.

== Works Translated to English ==
- Hypnosis and suggestion, 1964
- Science and religion (A Faith and Fact Book #127), 1962
- The Brain, 1962

Man and Cosmos: Scientific Phenomenology in Teilhard De Chardin.Herder and Herder, New York, 1965.
