= Kunštát =

- Town
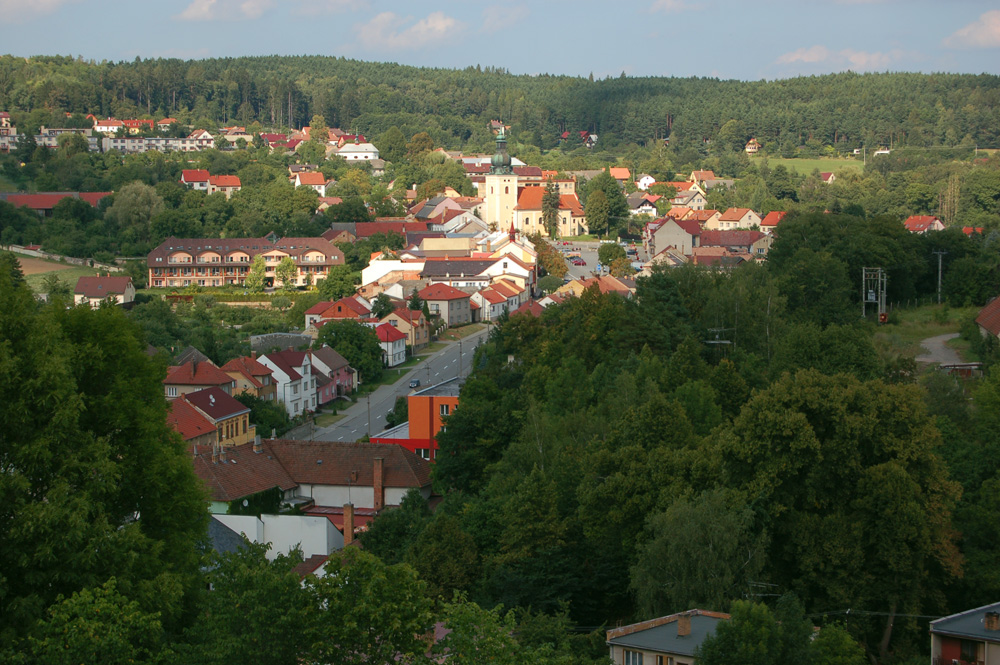
- Kunštát seen from the Kunštát Castle

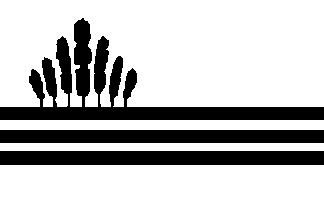
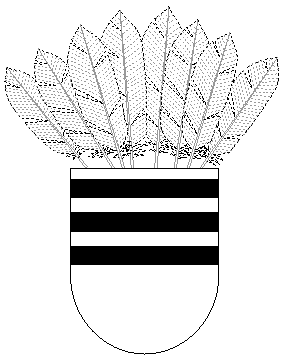
- Flag Coat of arms

- Location in the Czech Republic
- Coordinates: 49°30′23″N 16°31′2″E
- Country: Czech Republic
- Region: South Moravian
- District: Blansko
- First mentioned: 1279

Government
  - Mayor: Zdeněk Wetter

Area
  - Total: 24.20 km^{2} (9.34 sq mi)
- Elevation: 445 m (1,460 ft)

Population (2026-01-01)
  - Total: 2,946
  - Density: 121.7/km^{2} (315.3/sq mi)
- Time zone: UTC+1 (CET)
  - Summer (DST): UTC+2 (CEST)
- Postal code: 679 72
- Website: www.kunstat-mesto.cz

Kunštát (Czech pronunciation: [ˈkunʃtaːt]; German: Kunstadt) is a town in Blansko District in the South Moravian Region of the Czech Republic. It has about 2,900 inhabitants. The town is located on the Petrůvka Stream in the Upper Svratka Highlands.

Kunštát was founded in the 13th century, but it became a town only in 1994. The main landmark of the town is the Kunštát Castle.

== Administrative division ==
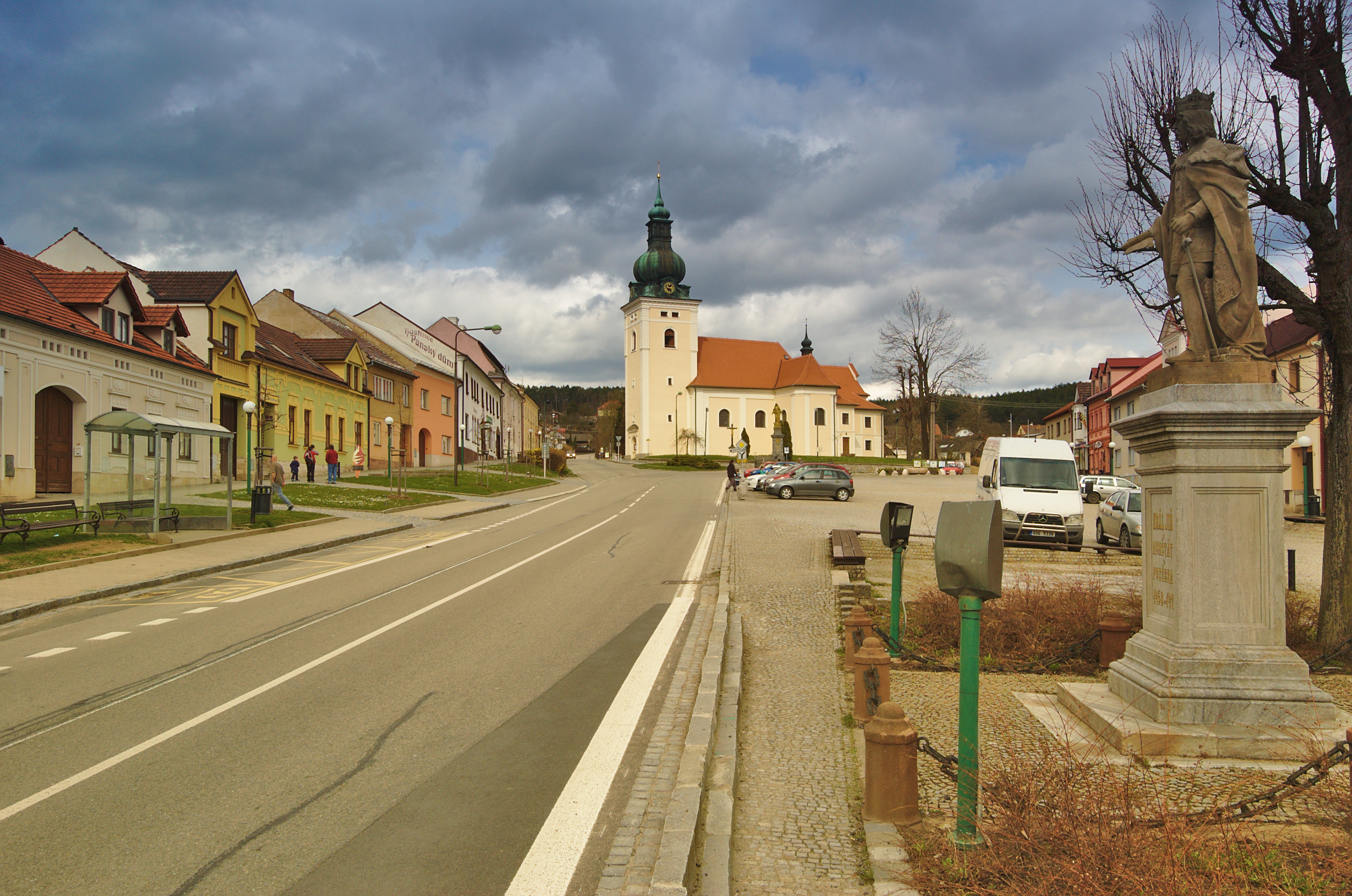
The square Náměstí Krále Jiřího with the Church of Saint Stanislaus

Kunštát consists of six municipal parts (in brackets population according to the 2021 census):

- Kunštát (1,903)
- Hluboké u Kunštátu (61)
- Rudka (215)
- Sychotín (242)
- Touboř (25)
- Újezd (288)

== Etymology ==
The name Kunštát is derived from the personal name Kuna, meaning "Kuna's place". It was named after the builder of the local castle and the first owner of Kunštát.

== Geography ==
Kunštát is located about 18 kilometres (11 mi) northwest of Blansko and 32 km (20 mi) north of Brno. It lies in the Upper Svratka Highlands. The highest point is at 698 metres (2,290 ft) above sea level. The Petrůvka Stream flows through the town.

== History ==
The first written mention of Kunštát is from 1279, when the estate was owned by Kuna, son of Gerhard of Zbraslav. The Lords of Kunštát held the estate until 1521. The most famous of the family was King George of Poděbrady, who was the owner of the Kunštát estate from 1427 to 1464.

In 1678, the estate was bought by the Counts of Lamberg. The Lambergs had the Kunštát Castle rebuilt into an early Baroque representative family residence. The free lords of Honrichs of Wolfswarffen owned the estate from 1783 to 1901 and had made Neoclassical modifications of the castle.

The last noble holders of the town were the Counts Coudenhove-Honrichs in 1901–1945. In 1994, Kunštát became a town.

== Demographics ==
Historical population

Year	Pop.	±%
1869	1,981	—
1880	2,345	+18.4%
1890	2,384	+1.7%
1900	2,515	+5.5%
1910	2,683	+6.7%

Year	Pop.	±%
1921	2,494	−7.0%
1930	2,423	−2.8%
1950	2,137	−11.8%
1961	2,305	+7.9%
1970	2,154	−6.6%

Year	Pop.	±%
1980	2,208	+2.5%
1991	2,264	+2.5%
2001	2,542	+12.3%
2011	2,672	+5.1%
2021	2,734	+2.3%

Source: Censuses

== Economy ==
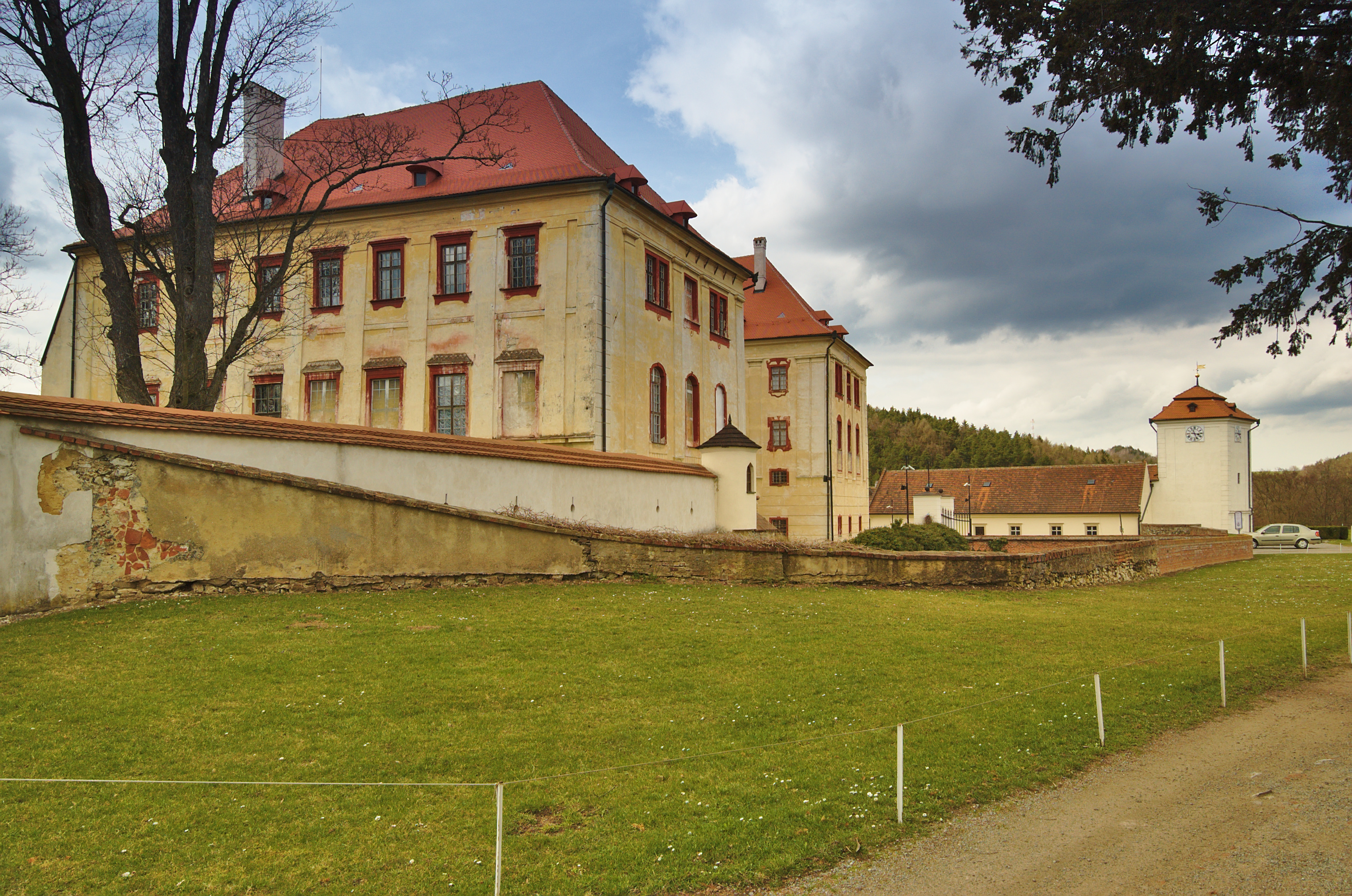
Kunštát Castle

Kunštát has a long tradition of pottery which began soon after establishment of the town. A potters guild was set up in 1620, joining together ten local potters. The craft reached its peak in the 19th century. Pottery fairs are held in the town since 1993. Today, private workshops hold the tradition.

== Transport ==
The I/19 road connects Kunštát with Žďár nad Sázavou and with a road to Brno.

== Sights ==
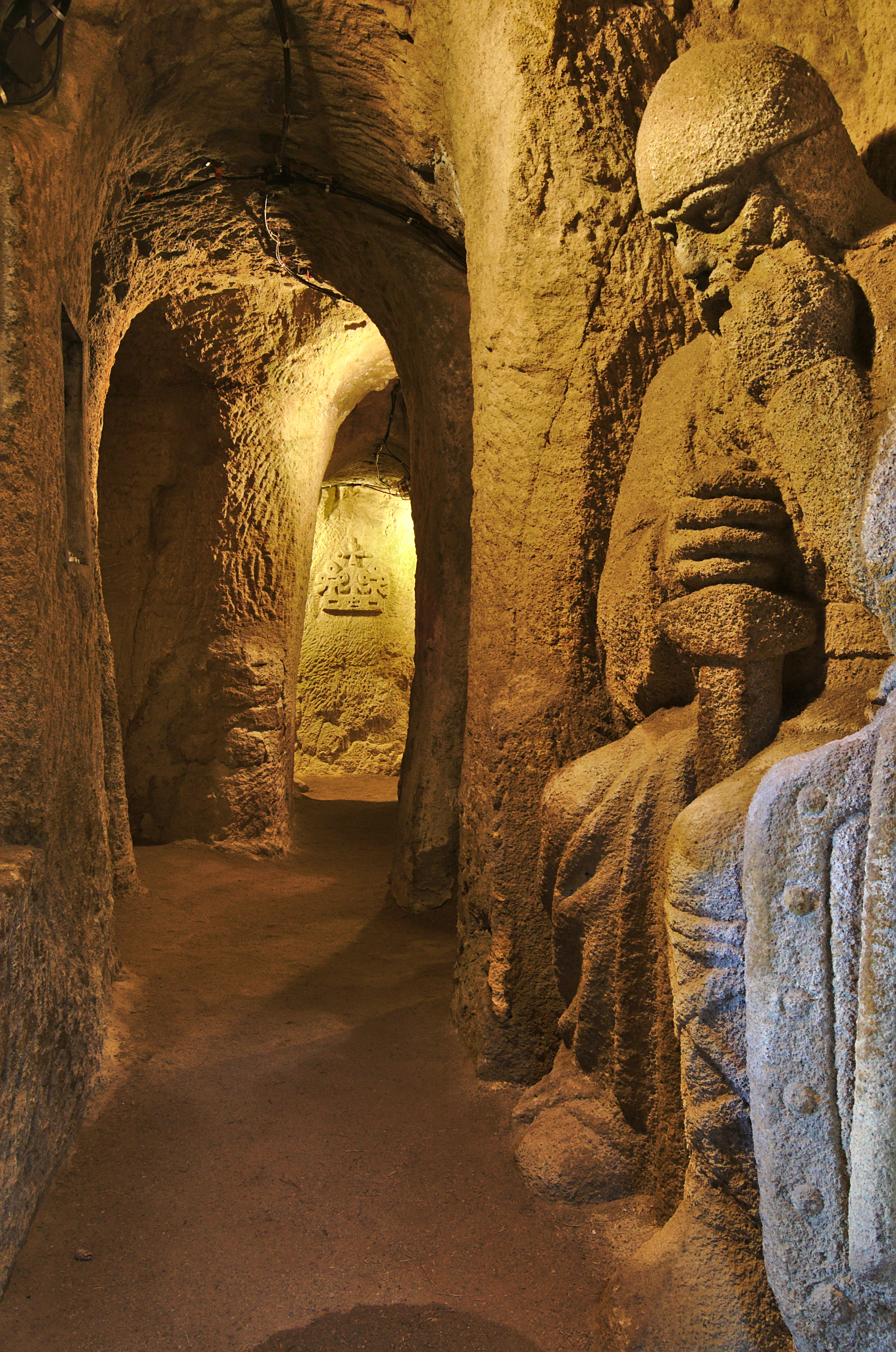
Blaník Knights Cave in Rudka

The Kunštát Castle is the main sight of the town. The original Romanesque-Gothic castle from the mid-13th century was rebuilt in the 16th and 17th centuries into the current form. It has preserved parts of all construction periods and is one of the oldest aristocratic castles in Moravia.

The castle complex is surrounded by a park and garden. Unique is the dog cemetery located next to the castle.

The Church of Saint Stanislaus Church is the main landmark of the town centre. It was originally built in the 15th century and was rebuilt in 1687. Other sights on the square are a statue of George of Poděbrady from 1885, a Baroque house from 1756, and the rectory from the late 18th century.

The second church in the town is the cemetery Church of the Holy Spirit, which was built before 1670 and rebuilt in 1738.

In the local part of Rudka on the slope of Milenka hill is a complex with Burian observation tower and Blaník Knights Cave. It is a sandstone cave and underground gallery. Statues of the Knights of Blaník, including the statue of St. Wenceslaus, were created in the cave. The landmark of the complex was a 14 metres (46 ft) high statue of Tomáš Garrigue Masaryk, but was destroyed during World War II and only shoes are preserved.

== Notable people ==
- František Halas (1901–1949), poet; lived here and is buried here
- Ludvík Kundera (1920–2010), poet, dramatist and translator

== Gallery ==
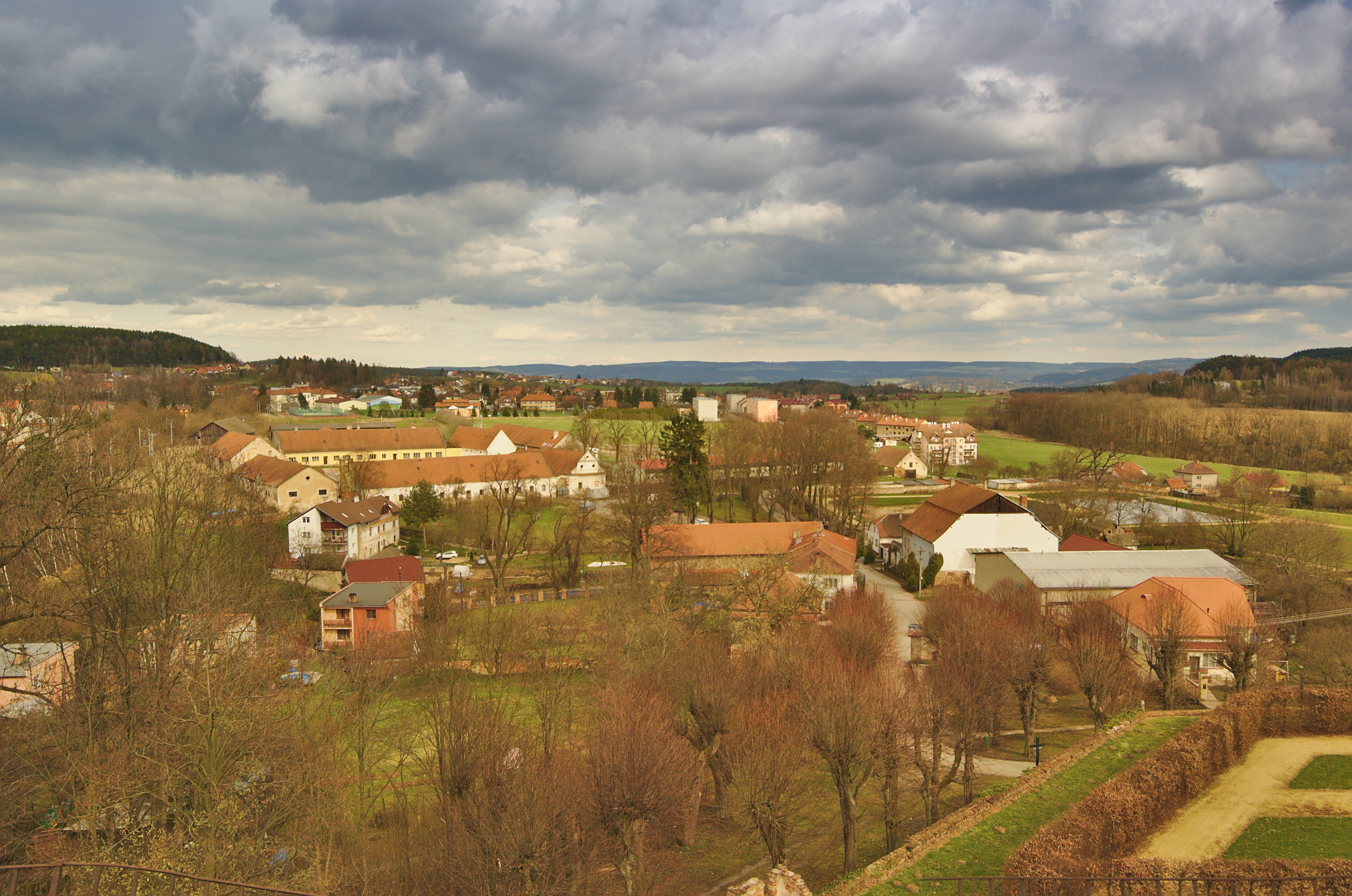
View of the town

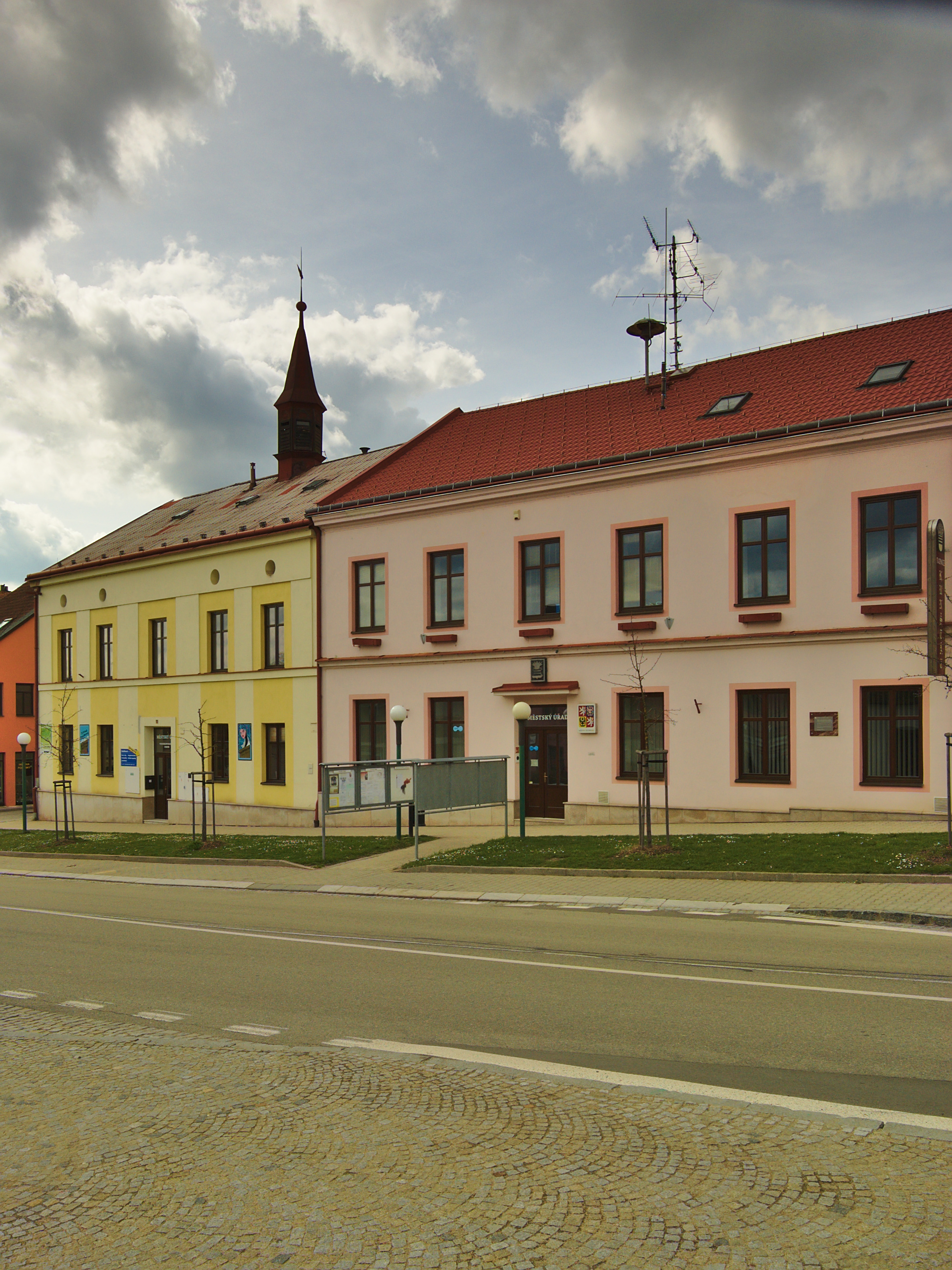
Town hall

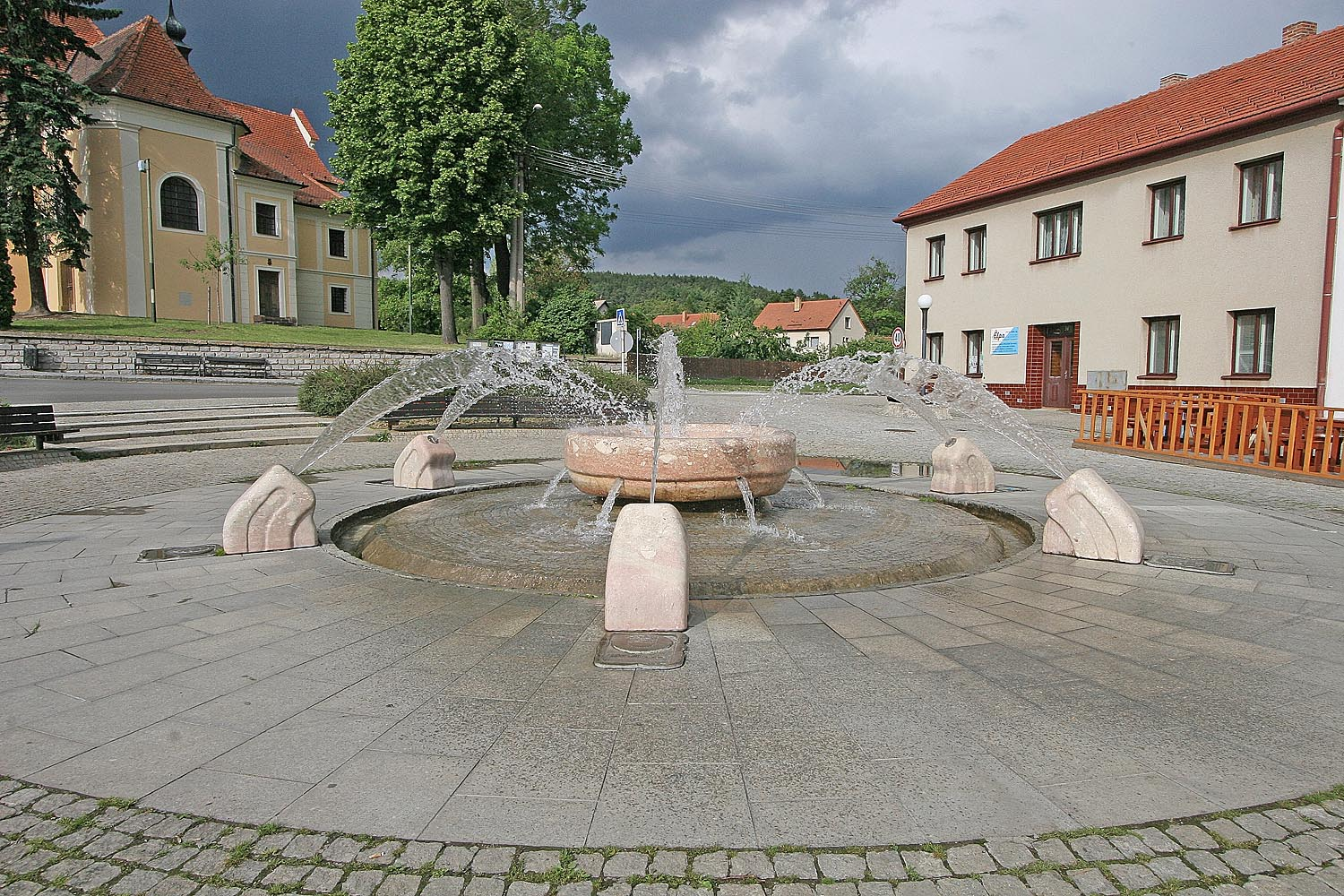
Fountains on Náměstí Krále Jiřího
