= Rozseč (Jihlava District) =

- Municipality
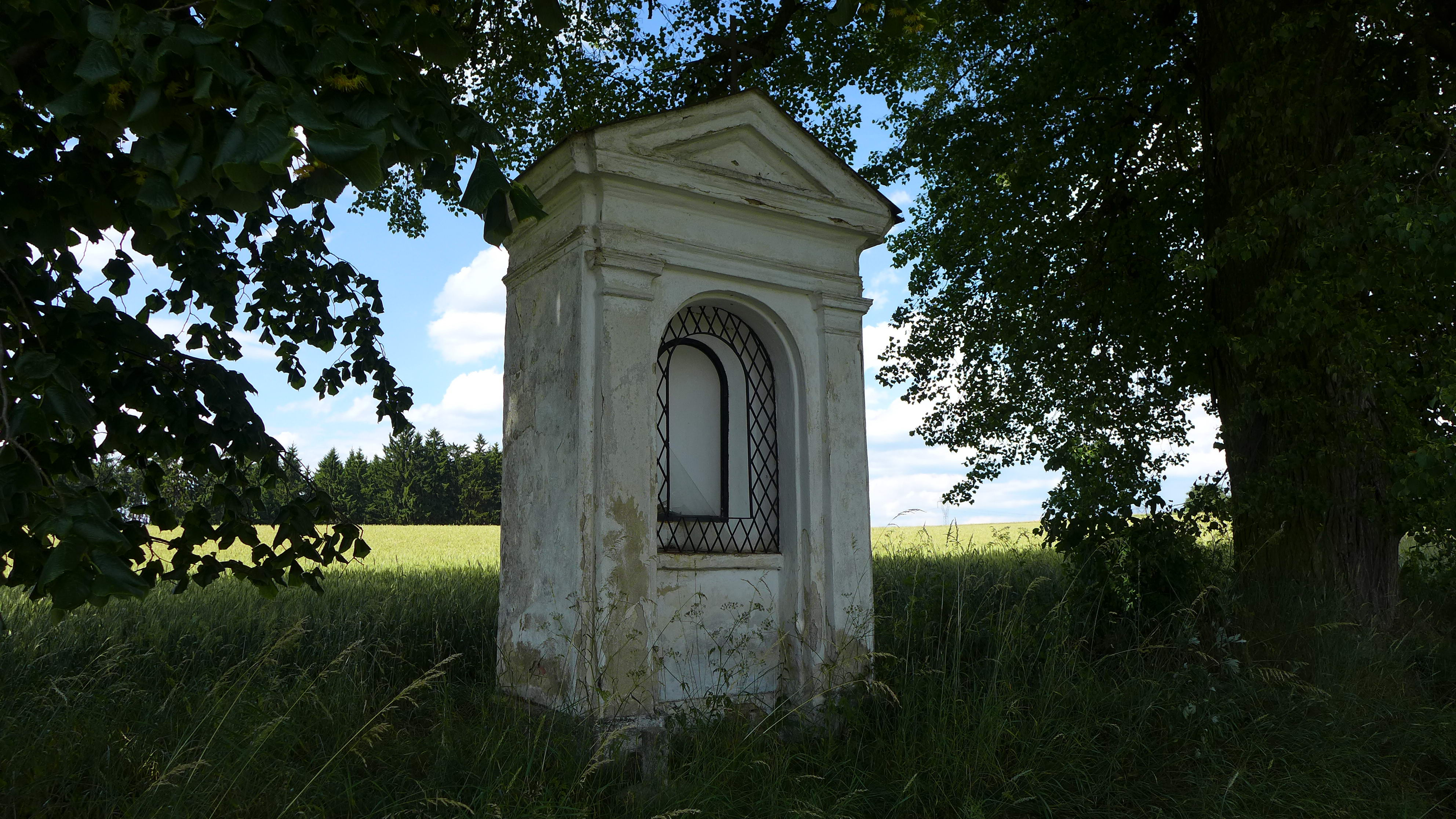
- Chapel in Rozseč

- Location in the Czech Republic
- Coordinates: 49°9′21″N 15°37′0″E
- Country: Czech Republic
- Region: Vysočina
- District: Jihlava
- First mentioned: 1349

Area
  - Total: 8.30 km^{2} (3.20 sq mi)
- Elevation: 596 m (1,955 ft)

Population (2026-01-01)
  - Total: 174
  - Density: 21.0/km^{2} (54.3/sq mi)
- Time zone: UTC+1 (CET)
  - Summer (DST): UTC+2 (CEST)
- Postal code: 588 66
- Website: www.obecrozsec.cz

Rozseč (Czech pronunciation: [ˈros.sɛtʃ]) is a municipality and village in Jihlava District in the Vysočina Region of the Czech Republic. It has about 200 inhabitants.

Rozseč lies approximately 27 kilometres (17 mi) south of Jihlava and 135 km (84 mi) south-east of Prague.

== Demographics ==
Historical population
Year	Pop.	±%
1869	466	—
1880	403	−13.5%
1890	404	+0.2%
1900	376	−6.9%
1910	396	+5.3%
1921	370	−6.6%
1930	391	+5.7%
1950	312	−20.2%
1961	296	−5.1%
1970	257	−13.2%
1980	222	−13.6%
1991	207	−6.8%
2001	197	−4.8%
2011	179	−9.1%
2021	137	−23.5%
Source: Censuses
