= Kunštát Castle =

Coordinates: 49.5025°N 16.5111°E

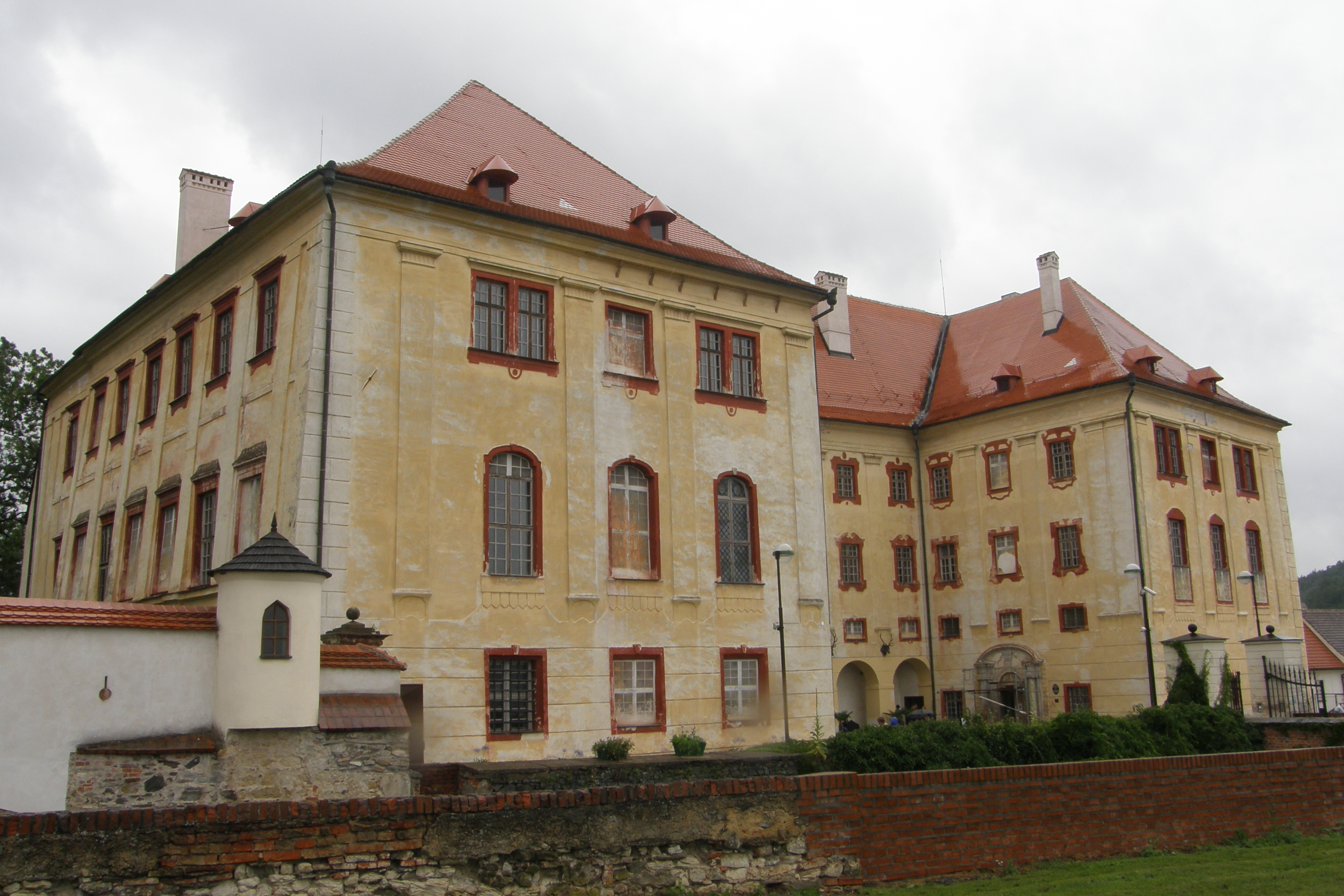
TKunštát Castle

Kunštát Castle (Czech: zámek Kunštát) is a castle in Kunštát in the South Moravian Region of the Czech Republic.

== History ==
The castle is located on the site of a former Romanesque castle, first mentioned in 1279. The castle was founded not later than in the mid-13th century.

In 1427–1464 it was the property of King George of Poděbrady. In the mid-16th century and second half of the 17th century, it was rebuilt to its current form. The castle has preserved late Romanesque palace and is one of the oldest aristocratic castles in Moravia.

After the World War II, the castle became property of the state. Since 2002, it has been a national cultural monument. In 2005, it was opened to the public.
