= Rozseč nad Kunštátem =

- Municipality
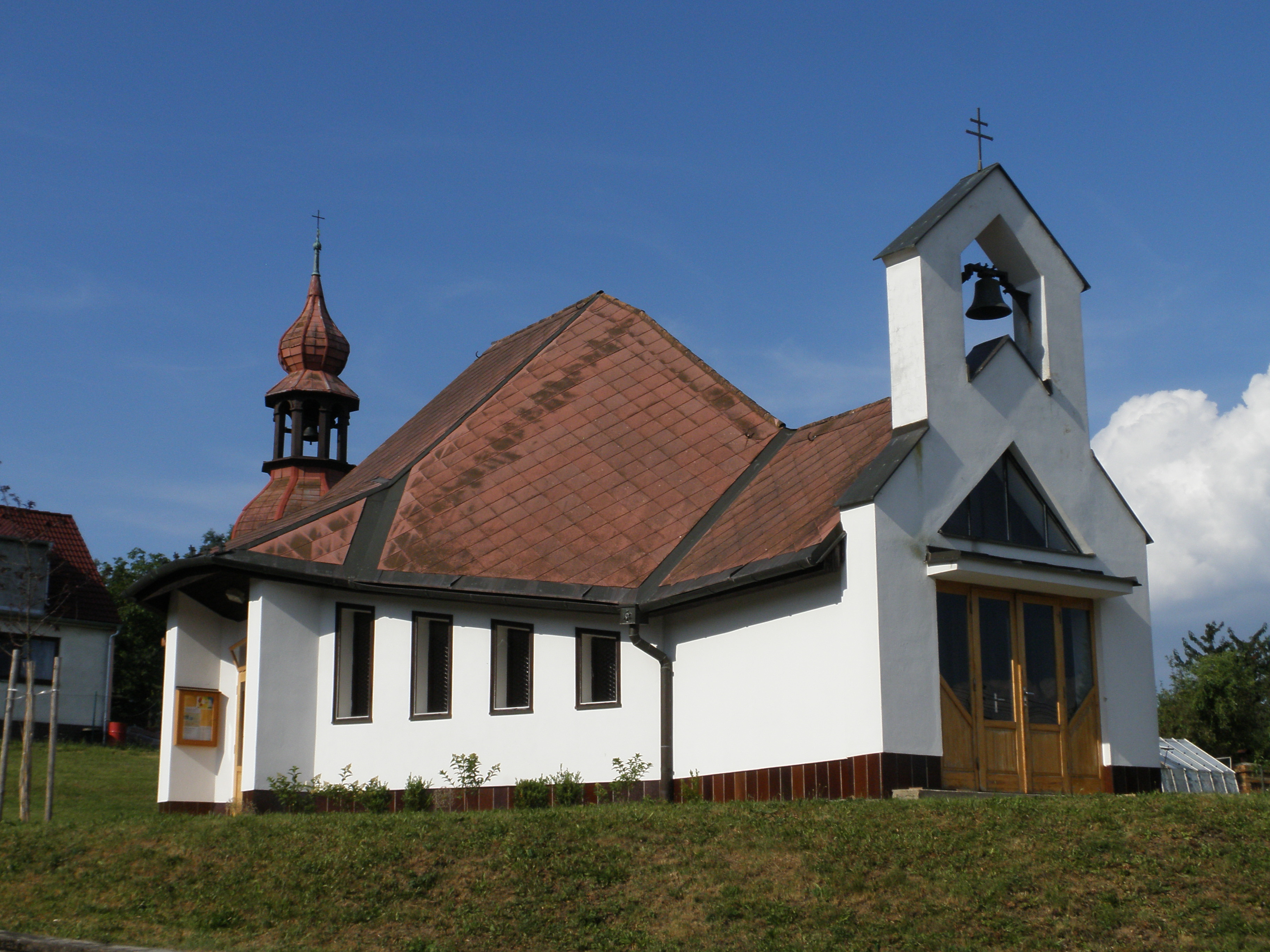
- Church of Saint Anthony of Padua

- Flag Coat of arms

- Location in the Czech Republic
- Coordinates: 49°31′28″N 16°27′47″E
- Country: Czech Republic
- Region: South Moravian
- District: Blansko
- First mentioned: 1350

Area
  - Total: 6.13 km^{2} (2.37 sq mi)
- Elevation: 628 m (2,060 ft)

Population (2026-01-01)
  - Total: 576
  - Density: 94.0/km^{2} (243/sq mi)
- Time zone: UTC+1 (CET)
  - Summer (DST): UTC+2 (CEST)
- Postal code: 679 73
- Website: www.rozsec.cz

Rozseč nad Kunštátem is a municipality and village in Blansko District in the South Moravian Region of the Czech Republic. It has about 600 inhabitants.

Rozseč nad Kunštátem lies approximately 22 kilometres (14 mi) north-west of Blansko, 37 km (23 mi) north of Brno, and 160 km (99 mi) south-east of Prague.

== Demographics ==
Historical population
Year	Pop.	±%
1869	601	—
1880	574	−4.5%
1890	574	+0.0%
1900	613	+6.8%
1910	638	+4.1%
1921	604	−5.3%
1930	536	−11.3%
1950	478	−10.8%
1961	463	−3.1%
1970	459	−0.9%
1980	472	+2.8%
1991	472	+0.0%
2001	500	+5.9%
2011	504	+0.8%
2021	546	+8.3%
Source: Censuses
