= Bedřich Václavek =

Czech literary theorist and critic (1897–1943)

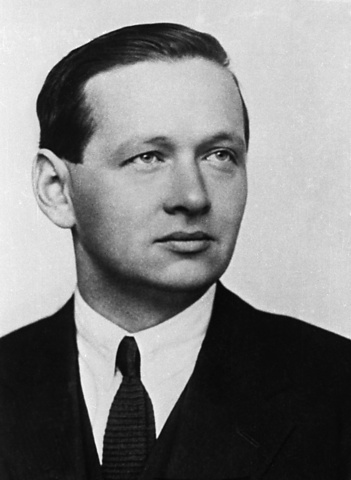
- Bedřich Václavek in 1929
- Born: 10 January 1897; Čáslavice, Moravia, Austria-Hungary
- Died: 5 March 1943 (aged 46); Auschwitz concentration camp
- Occupations: Literary theorist, essayist, critic, folklorist, politician, translator

Bedřich Václavek (10 January 1897 – 5 March 1943) was a Czech literary theorist, critic, journalist and Marxist aesthetician.

== Biography ==
Václavek was born on 10 January 1897 in Čáslavice into a poor rural family. After graduating from high school in 1915, he was drafted into the army, where he served until the end of World War I. Then he entered Charles University in Prague, where from 1918 to 1923 he studied Germanic and Bohemian studies at the Faculty of Philosophy. His teachers were leading figures in Czech literary studies and folklore such as Zdeněk Nejedlý and Otokar Fischer. In 1922 he went to Berlin and studied theater and journalism there. After that he worked as a school teacher and librarian at the State and University libraries in Brno. He was a member of the group of avant-garde artists Devětsil.

A member of the Communist Party of Czechoslovakia from 1925, Bedřich Václavek was actively involved in the labor movement of his region, organizing actions of solidarity between cultural figures and striking miners in 1932. In 1933, Bedřich Václavek came under police surveillance due to his active communist activities and was transferred away from Brno – to the university library in Olomouc. He was also one of the main organisers of the Left Front. In 1939, he had become an associate professor at the Masaryk University, however his PhD thesis was not accepted by the ministry of education.

After the Nazi invasion, Václavek went underground, becoming one of the leaders of the Communist Party of Czechoslovakia, which had been banned. Julius Fučík brought him to work in the editorial office of the illegal newspaper of the Central Committee of the party Rudé právo. In 1942, after Fučík's arrest, Gestapo picked up Václavek's trail and he was soon arrested.

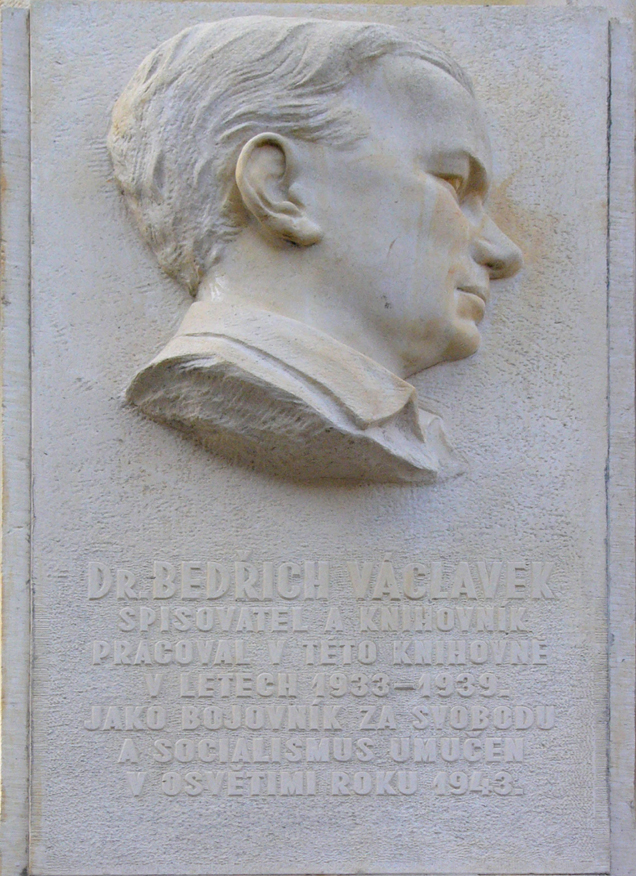
Commemorative plaque on the building of the Research Library in Olomouc

During the first interrogation he identified himself by the pseudonym "Grdina" (translated as 'hero'). Václavek was tortured by the Prague Gestapo and imprisoned in Pankrác Prison. He died on 5 March 1943 (possibly killed by lethal injection) in the Auschwitz concentration camp at the age of 46, without giving his real name.

== Works ==
Bedřich Václavek was one of the most prominent critics and theorists of avant-garde art and Czech Marxist literature. He analysed aesthetics, literary criticism, popular culture and history from the perspective of a Marxist. He initially belonged to the theorists of the avant-garde and was a representative of poetism and constructivism but in the 1930s became a proponent of Socialist realism. He represented a synthetic and dynamic view of socialist realism as a synthesis of avant-garde and proletarian art with active relationships with life. He also devoted himself to noetic questions in art.

=== Books ===
- Od umění k tvorbě, 1928, 1949
- Poesie v rozpacích, 1930
- Česká literatura XX. století, 1935, 1947, 1974
- Tvorbou k realitě, 1937, 1946
- Písemnictví a lidová tradice, 1938, 1947
- Lidová slovesnost v českém vývoji literárním, 1940
- Deset týdnů, 1946, 1958
- O české písni lidové a zlidovělé, 1950
- Tvorba a společnost, 1961
- Literární studie a podobizny, 1962
- O lidové písni a slovesnosti, 1963
- Knihy z Ruska a o Rusku, 1965
- Tradice a modernost, 1973
- Kritické stati z třicátých let, 1975
- Juvenilie, 1978
- Ruská revoluce a literatura, 1980
- Tvorba a skutečnost, 1980
- Korespondence Bedřich Václavek s Hanou Humlovou, 1983

=== Collected works ===
- Společenské vlivy v životě a díle K. H. Máchy, Torzo a tajemství Máchova díla, 1938
- SSSR v československé poezii, 1936
- České písně kramářské, (Mitautor Robert Smetana), 1937, 1949
- Všemu navzdory (unter dem Pseudonym P. Bok), 1938
- Český národní zpěvník, (Mitautor Robert Smetana), 1940, 1949
- Historie utěšené a kratochvilné, 1941 (Pseudonym L. Čivrný), 1950
- Český listář, 1949
- Kniha satir, (Mitautor D. Šajner), 1949
- České světské písně zlidovělé, (Mitautor Robert Smetana), 1955
