= Senate district 30 – Kladno =

Electoral district in the Czech Republic

30 – Kladno
- inline Senate district of the Czech Republic

- The Kladno district on a map
- Senator: Petr Paták; ODS
- Region: Central Bohemia
- District: Kladno; Prague-West
- Electorate: 116 813
- Area: 519.85 km²
- Last election: 2026
- Next election: 2032

Senate district 30 – Kladno is an electoral district of the Senate of the Czech Republic, located in parts of the Kladno and Prague-West districts. From 2020 onwards, Petr Paták, an ODS member, is the Senator for the district.

== Senators ==
Year	Senator	Party
1996	Ladislav Svoboda	ČSSD
2002	Ladislav Svoboda	ČSSD
2008	Jiří Dienstbier	ČSSD
2011	Jiří Dienstbier Jr.	ČSSD
2014	Jiří Dienstbier Jr.	ČSSD
2020	Adéla Šípová	Pirates
2026	Petr Paták	ODS

== Election results ==
=== 1998 ===
1996 Czech Senate election in Kladno
Candidate	Party	1st round		2nd round	
Candidate	Party	Votes	%	Votes	%
Ladislav Svoboda	ČSSD	7 828	19,66	20 480	54,94
František Samek	ODS	12 924	35,45	16 798	45,06
Jiří Kopsa	KSČM	7 068	17,75	—	—
Vladimír Stehlík	Independent	6 864	17,24	—	—
Jarolím Bureš	ODA	2 449	6,15	—	—
Miloslav Voráček	Independent	2 281	5,73	—	—
František Kupec	ČSNS	411	1,03	—	—

=== 2002 ===
2002 Czech Senate election in Kladno
Candidate	Party	1st round		2nd round	
Candidate	Party	Votes	%	Votes	%
Ladislav Svoboda	ČSSD	7 138	28,04	18 203	52,63
Jindřich Sybera	ODS	8 591	33,75	16 383	47,36
Jana Klasová	KSČM	5 738	22,54	—	—
Marie Bednářová	SNK	3 987	15,66	—	—

=== 2008 ===
2008 Czech Senate election in Kladno
Candidate	Party	1st round		2nd round	
Candidate	Party	Votes	%	Votes	%
Jiří Dienstbier	ČSSD	16 232	36,88	20 907	56,14
Dan Jiránek	ODS	16 001	36,36	16 333	43,85
Zdeněk Levý	KSČM	7 299	16,58	—	—
Luboš Vrtilka	NEZ/DEM	1 914	4,34	—	—
Pavla Bernardová	SDŽ	1 415	3,21	—	—
Zdeněk Joukl	DOHODA30	1 143	2,59	—	—

=== 2011 ===
2011 Czech senate by-election in Kladno
Candidate	Party	1st round		2nd round	
Candidate	Party	Votes	%	Votes	%
Jiří Dienstbier Jr.	ČSSD	12 088	44,27	13 505	65,14
Dan Jiránek	ODS	7 422	27,18	7 227	34,85
Zdeněk Levý	KSČM	2 435	8,91	—	—
Luděk Kvapil	TOP 09, STAN	2 053	7,51	—	—
Jana Bobošíková	SBB	1 993	7,29	—	—
Karel Protiva	Citizens, KAN	571	2,09	—	—
Miroslav Rovenský	KDU-ČSL	346	1,26	—	—
Ivo Vašíček	Pirates	205	0,75	—	—
Milan Vodička	Svobodní	191	0,69	—	—

=== 2014 ===
2014 Czech Senate election in Kladno
Candidate	Party	1st round		2nd round	
Candidate	Party	Votes	%	Votes	%
Jiří Dienstbier Jr.	ČSSD	11 806	30,63	9 485	55,40
Michaela Vojtová	TOP 09, STAN	7 220	18,73	7 633	44,59
Jiří Landa	ANO 2011	5 738	14,89	—	—
Rudolf Carvan	KSČM	4 219	10,94	—	—
Lenka Kohoutová	ODS	3 005	7,79	—	—
Jana Šrámková	KAN	2 738	7,10	—	—
Karel Kasal	SD-SN	1 534	3,98	—	—
Otto Chaloupka	Republic	965	2,50	—	—
Josef Hausmann	ND	671	1,74	—	—
Radek Stehlík	ANEO	639	1,65	—	—

=== 2020 ===
2020 Czech Senate election in Kladno
Candidate	Party	1st round		2nd round	
Candidate	Party	Votes	%	Votes	%
Adéla Šípová	Pirates	7 680	17,80	13 031	67,13
Petr Bendl	ODS	6 086	14,10	6 378	32,86
Milan Volf	ČP	5 227	12,11	—	—
Michaela Vojtová	ANO 2011	5 026	11,65	—	—
Ondřej Závodský	KDU-ČSL, TOP 09	4 539	10,52	—	—
Jiří Dienstbier Jr.	ČSSD, Greens, Budoucnost	3 799	8,80	—	—
Markéta Fröhlichová	STAN	3 553	8,23	—	—
Miloslava Vostrá	KSČM	2 588	5,99	—	—
Václav Bošek	SPD	1 865	4,32	—	—
Jiří Landa	Tricolour	1 800	4,17	—	—
David Bohbot	Svobodní	566	1,31	—	—
Naděžda Zímová	RČ	236	0,54	—	—
Michal Oliva	NáS	172	0,39	—	—

=== 2026 ===
2026 Czech Senate election in Kladno
Candidate	Party	1st round		2nd round	
Candidate	Party	Votes	%	Votes	%
Petr Paták	ODS	14 112	29,44	11 247	51,66
Adéla Sucharda Šípová	Pirates, STAN, TOP 09, Greens, SEN 21	14 766	30,80	10 524	48,33
Aleš Gerloch	ANO 2011	10 622	22,16	—	—
Jan Klas	Our Czechia	3 886	8,10	—	—
Marcela Machalová	SPD	2 945	6,14	—	—
Jaroslav Pelc	Přísaha	1 602	3,34	—	—
