= Velvet Revolution =

Democratization process in Czechoslovakia in 1989

- Part of the Revolutions of 1989
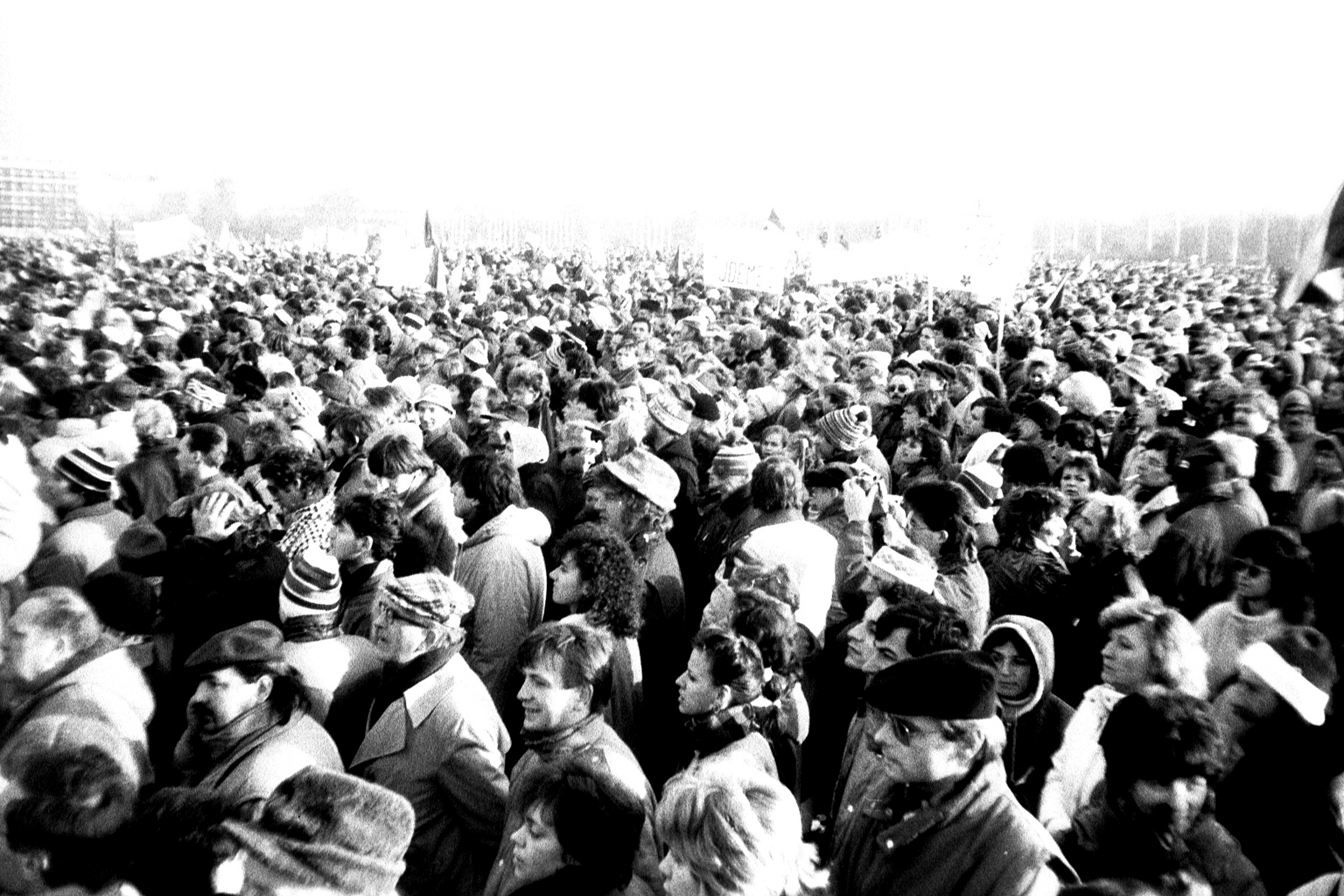
- Demonstration in Prague, 25 November 1989
- Date: 17 November – 29 December 1989 Main phase: 17 – 28 November 1989
- Location: Czechoslovakia
- Caused by: Political repression; Totalitarianism; Economic stagnation; Revolutions of 1989; Martin Šmíd death hoax
- Goals: Resignation of the Communist government; Democracy and free elections; Civil rights; Economic reform
- Methods: Civil disobedience; Civil resistance; Demonstrations; Strike actions
- Result: Collapse of the communist regime in Czechoslovakia; Resignation of the Politburo of the Communist Party (24 November 1989); Dissident leader Václav Havel becomes the President of Czechoslovakia (29 December 1989); Restoration of parliamentary democracy with free elections in June 1990; Start of Hyphen War which eventually led to Velvet Divorce (breakup of Czechoslovakia); Dismantling of the command economy and privatization of state-owned industry

Parties
Government of Czechoslovakia; Communist Party; People's Militia; SNB; StB; VB	Czechoslovak opposition; Civic Forum; Public Against Violence; Charter 77; Stuha; Government defectors; Other dissidents; Supported by: United States; Embassy of the United States, Prague

Lead figures
Hardliners: Miloš Jakeš; Milán Václavík; Jan Fojtík; Miroslav Štěpán; Alois Indra; Vasiľ Biľak; Gustáv Husák; Moderates: Karel Urbánek; Ladislav Adamec; Lubomír Štrougal; Marián Čalfa; Milan Čič	Dissident leaders: Václav Havel; Alexander Dubček; Václav Benda; Ján Budaj; Ján Čarnogurský; Jiří Dienstbier; Luboš Dobrovský; Václav Klaus; Milan Kňažko; Valtr Komárek; Rita Klímová; Petr Pithart; Petr Uhl; Jan Urban; Michael Žantovský; Political/diplomatic support: Shirley Temple

Casualties and losses
	568 injured

The Velvet Revolution (Czech: sametová revoluce) or Gentle Revolution (Slovak: nežná revolúcia) was a non-violent transition of power in what was then Czechoslovakia, occurring from 17 November to 28 November 1989. Popular demonstrations against the one-party government of the Communist Party of Czechoslovakia included students and older dissidents. The result was the end of 41 years of one-party rule in Czechoslovakia, and the subsequent dismantling of the command economy and conversion to a parliamentary republic.

On 17 November 1989 (International Students' Day), riot police suppressed a student demonstration in Prague. The event marked the 50th anniversary of a violently suppressed demonstration against the Nazi storming of Prague University in 1939 where 1,200 students were arrested and 9 killed (see Origin of International Students' Day). The 1989 event sparked a series of demonstrations from 17 November to late December and turned into an anti-communist demonstration. On 20 November, the number of protesters assembled in Prague grew from 200,000 the previous day to an estimated 500,000. The entire top leadership of the Communist Party, including General Secretary Miloš Jakeš, resigned on 24 November. On 27 November, a two-hour general strike involving all citizens of Czechoslovakia was held.

In response to the collapse of other Warsaw Pact governments and the increasing street protests, the Communist Party of Czechoslovakia announced on 28 November that it would relinquish power and end the one-party state. Two days later, the federal parliament formally expunged the sections of the Constitution giving the Communist Party a monopoly of power. Barbed wire and other obstructions were removed from the border with West Germany and Austria in early December. On 10 December, President Gustáv Husák appointed the first largely non-communist government in Czechoslovakia since 1948, and resigned. Alexander Dubček was elected speaker of the federal parliament on 28 December and Václav Havel the president of Czechoslovakia on 29 December 1989.

In June 1990, Czechoslovakia held its first democratic elections since 1946. On 31 December 1992, Czechoslovakia peacefully split into two countries, the Czech Republic and the Slovak Republic. The dissolution of Czechoslovakia occurred mainly due to national governance issues between the Slovaks and Czechs (the two major ethnicities comprising the former Czechoslovakia).

== Prior to the revolution ==
The Communist Party seized power on 25 February 1948. No official opposition parties operated thereafter. Dissidents (notably Charter 77 and Civic Forum) created Music Clubs (on a limited basis as only allowed NGOs) and published home-made periodicals (samizdat). Charter 77 was quashed by the government and its signed members were persecuted until the fall of the regime in Czechoslovakia. Later, with the advent of the Civic Forum, independence could truly be seen on the horizon. Until Independence Day on 17 November 1989, the populace faced persecution by the authorities from the secret police. Thus, the general public did not openly support the dissidents for fear of dismissal from work or school. Writers or filmmakers could have their books or films banned for a "negative attitude towards the socialist regime". They also did not allow Czechs and Slovaks to travel to other non-communist countries. Following this they banned music from foreign countries. People were blacklisted for various reasons: being children of former entrepreneurs or non-Communist politicians; having family members in the West; supporting Alexander Dubček during the Prague Spring; opposing the Soviet military occupation; promoting religion; boycotting the rigged parliamentary elections; signing Charter 77; or associating with anyone who had done these things. These rules were easy to enforce, as all schools, media and businesses belonged to the state. They were under direct supervision and often were used as accusatory weapons against rivals.

The nature of blacklisting changed gradually after the introduction of Mikhail Gorbachev's policies of Glasnost (openness) and Perestroika (restructuring) in 1985. The Czechoslovak Communist leadership verbally supported Perestroika, but made few changes. Speaking about the Prague Spring of 1968 was taboo. The first anti-government demonstrations occurred in 1988 (the Candle Demonstration, for example) and 1989, but these were dispersed and participants were repressed by the police.

By the late 1980s, discontent with living standards and economic inadequacy gave way to popular support for economic reform. Citizens began to challenge the system more openly. By 1989, citizens who had been complacent were willing to openly express their discontent with the regime. Numerous important figures as well as ordinary workers signed petitions in support of Václav Havel during his imprisonment in 1989.

Already in early 1989, the first signs of thawing relations began to appear between Communist Czechoslovakia and Israel, with meetings held on shared issues, including Jewish religious freedom, the memory of the Holocaust and ties of remaining Czechoslovak Jews with the Diaspora, including the strong Jewish community in the United States.

Reform-minded attitudes were also reflected by the many individuals who signed a petition that circulated in the summer of 1989 calling for the end of censorship and the beginning of fundamental political reform.

The immediate impetus for the revolution came from developments in neighbouring countries and in the Czechoslovak capital. From August, East German citizens had occupied the West German Embassy in Prague and demanded exile to West Germany. In the days following 3 November, thousands of East Germans left Prague by train to West Germany. On 9 November, the Berlin Wall fell, removing the need for the detour.

By 16 November, many of Czechoslovakia's neighbours were beginning to shed authoritarian rule. The citizens of Czechoslovakia watched these events on TV through both foreign and domestic channels. The Soviet Union also supported a change in the ruling elite of Czechoslovakia, although it did not anticipate the overthrow of the Communist regime.

== Chronology ==
=== 16 November ===
On the eve of International Students Day (the 50th anniversary of Sonderaktion Prag, the 1939 storming of Prague universities by the Nazis), Slovak high school and university students organised a peaceful demonstration in the centre of Bratislava. The Communist Party of Slovakia had expected trouble, and the mere fact that the demonstration was organised was viewed as a problem by the Party. Armed forces were put on alert before the demonstration. In the end, however, the students moved through the city peacefully and sent a delegation to the Slovak Ministry of Education to discuss their demands.

=== 17 November ===
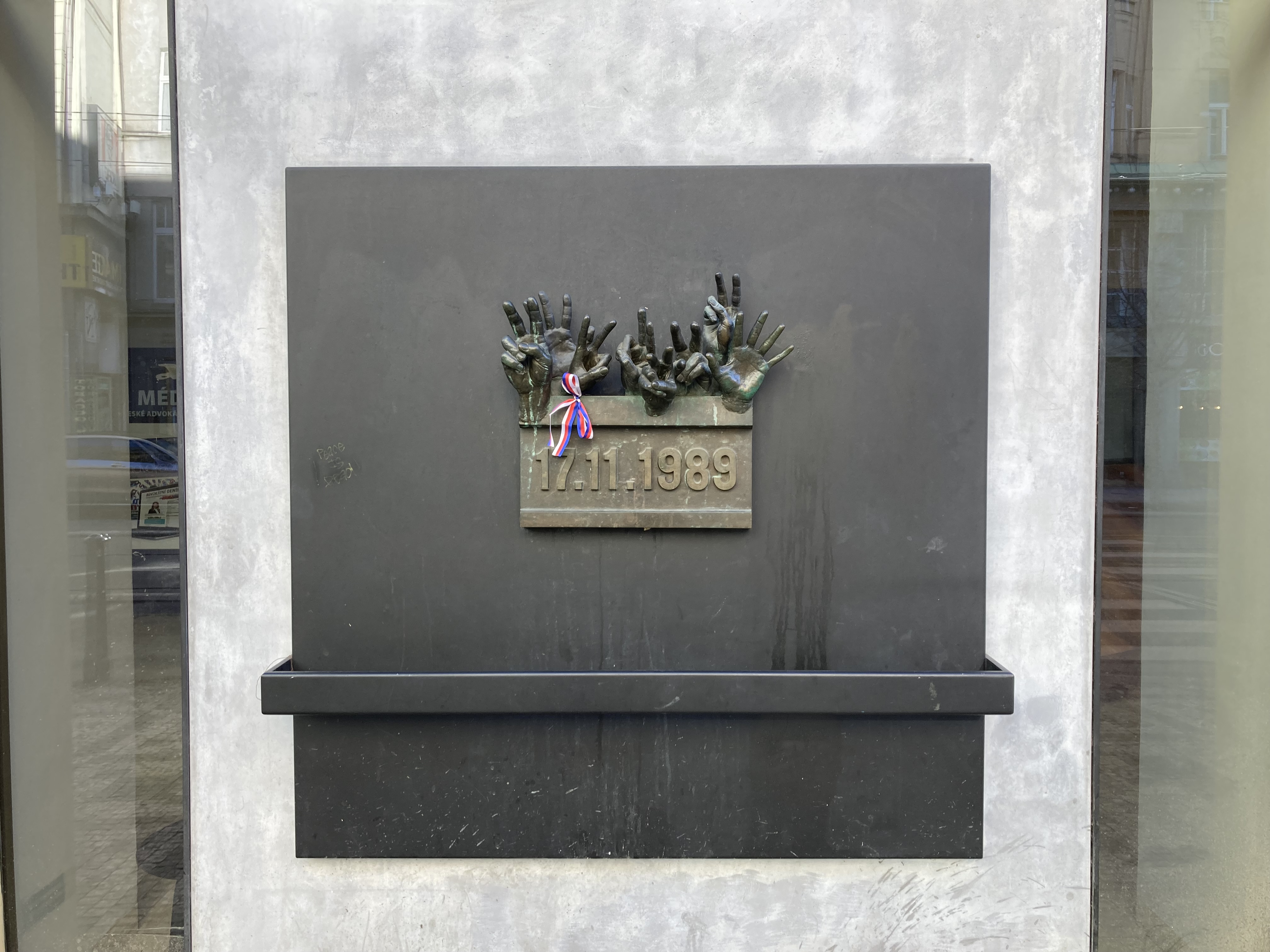
Memorial of the student demonstrations of 17 November, in Prague

New movements led by Václav Havel surfaced, invoking the idea of a united society where the state would politically restructure. The Socialist Youth Union (SSM/SZM, proxy of the Communist Party of Czechoslovakia) organised a mass demonstration on 17 November to commemorate International Students Day and the fiftieth anniversary of the murder of student Jan Opletal by the Nazi government.

Most members of SSM were privately opposed to the Communist leadership, but were afraid of speaking up for fear of persecution. This demonstration gave average students an opportunity to join others and express their opinions. By 16:00 (4:00 pm), about 15,000 people joined the demonstration. They walked (per the strategy of founders of Stuha movement, Jiří Dienstbier and Šimon Pánek) to Karel Hynek Mácha's grave at Vyšehrad Cemetery and – after the official end of the march – continued into the centre of Prague, carrying banners and chanting anti-Communist slogans.

At about 19:30 (7:30pm), the demonstrators were stopped by a cordon of riot police at Národní Street. They blocked all escape routes and attacked the students. Once all the protesters dispersed, one of the participants, secret police agent Ludvík Zifčák, was lying on the street. Zifčák was not physically hurt or pretending to be dead; he simply fainted. Policemen carried his motionless body to an ambulance.

The atmosphere of fear and hopelessness gave birth to a hoax about a dead student named Martin Šmíd. The story was made up by Drahomíra Dražská as she awaited treatment after she was hurt during the riot. Dražská worked at the college and shared her hoax with several people the next day, including the wife of journalist Petr Uhl, a correspondent for Radio Free Europe/Radio Liberty. This incident mobilised the people and triggered the revolution. That same evening, students and theatre actors agreed to go on strike.

=== 18 November ===
Two students visited Prime Minister Ladislav Adamec at his private residence and described to him what happened on Národní Street. The strike at the Realistic Theatre was declared and other theatres quickly followed. The theaters opened their stages only for public discussions.

At the initiative of students from the Academy of Performing Arts in Prague, the students in Prague went on strike. This strike was joined by university students throughout Czechoslovakia. Theatre employees and actors in Prague supported the strike. Instead of going on stage, actors read a proclamation by the students and artists to the audience, calling for a general strike on 27 November.

Home-made posters and proclamations were posted. As all media (radio, TV, newspapers) were strictly controlled by the Communist Party (see Mass media in Communist Czechoslovakia), this was the only way to spread the message.

In the evening, Radio Free Europe reported that a student (named as Martin Šmíd) was killed by the police during the previous day's demonstration. Although the report was false, it heightened the feeling of crisis, and persuaded some hesitant citizens to overcome their fear and join the protests.

=== 19 November ===
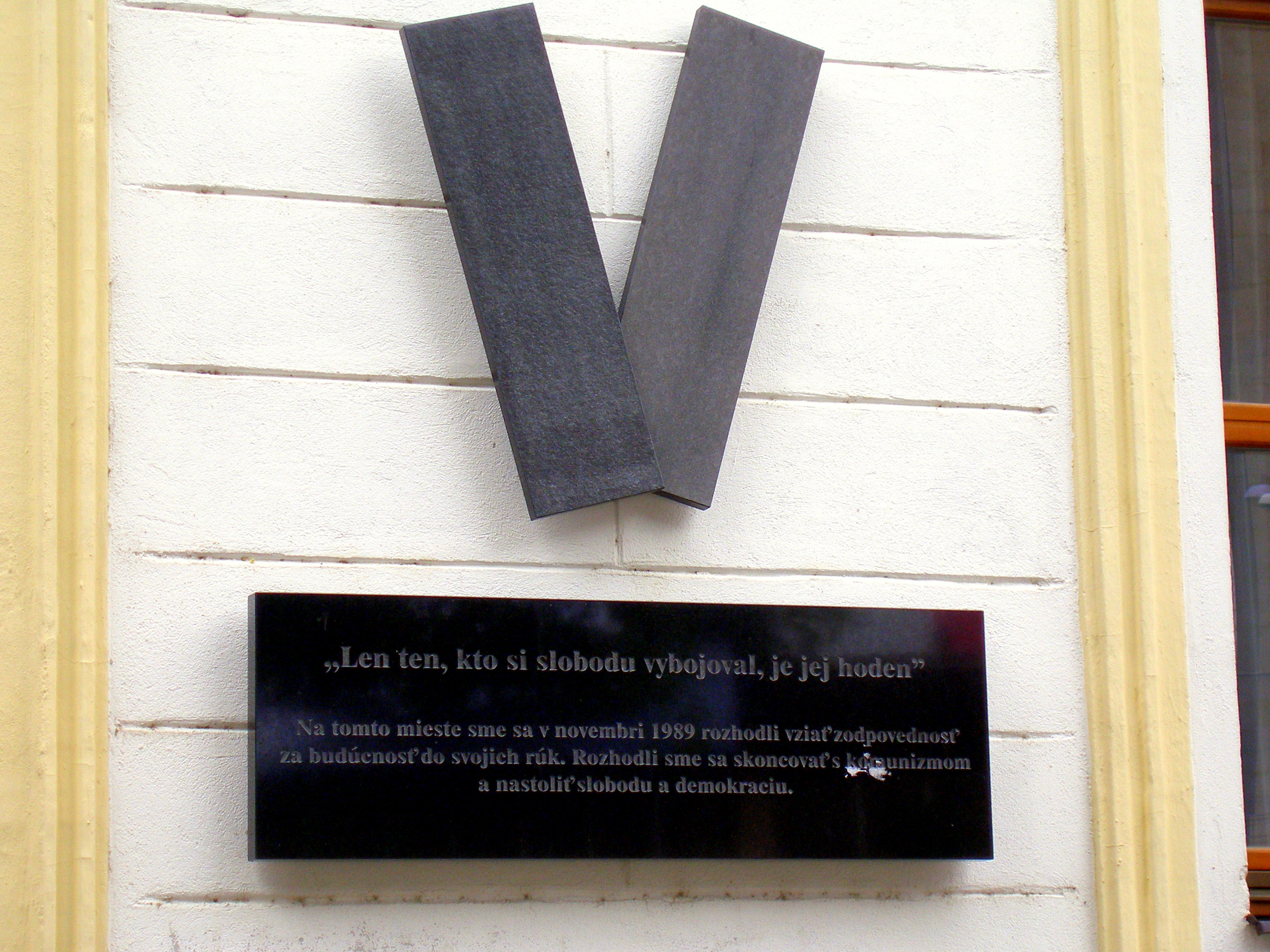
Memorial of the Velvet revolution in Bratislava (Námestie SNP), Slovakia: "'Only those who struggle for their freedom are worthy of it.' At this place in November 1989 we decided to take our responsibility for the future into our own hands. We decided to put an end to communism and to establish freedom and democracy."

Theatres in Bratislava, Brno, Ostrava and other towns went on strike. Members of artistic and literary associations as well as organisations and institutions joined the strike.

Members of a civic initiative met with the Prime Minister, who told them he was twice prohibited from resigning his post and that change requires mass demonstrations like those in East Germany (some 250,000 students). He asked them to keep the number of "casualties" during the expected change to a minimum.

About 500 Slovak artists, scientists and leaders met at the Art Forum (Umelecká beseda) in Bratislava at 17:00. They denounced the attack against the students in Prague on 17 November and formed Public Against Violence, which would become the leading force behind the opposition movement in Slovakia. Its founding members included Milan Kňažko, Ján Budaj and others.

Actors and members of the audience in a Prague theatre, together with Václav Havel and other prominent members of Charter 77 and other dissident organisations, established the Civic Forum (Občanské fórum, an equivalent of the Slovak Public Against Violence for the territory of the Czech Republic) as a mass popular movement for reforms. They called for the dismissal of top officials responsible for the violence, and an independent investigation of the incident and the release of all political prisoners.

College students went on strike. On television, government officials called for peace and a return to the city's normal business. An interview with Martin Šmíd was broadcast to persuade the public that nobody had been killed, but the quality of the recording was low and rumours continued. It would take several more days to confirm that nobody was killed, and by then the revolution had gained further momentum.

The leaders of the Democratic Initiative presented several demands, including the resignation of the government, effective 25 November, and the formation of a temporary government composed of non-compromised members of the current government.

=== 20 November ===
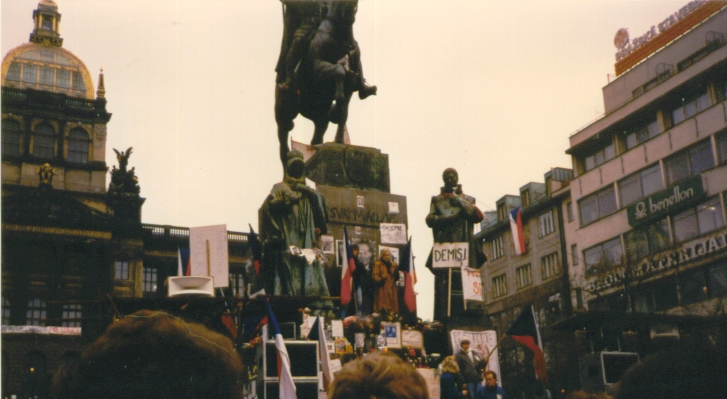
St. Wenceslas Monument

Students and theatres went on "permanent" strike. Police stopped a demonstration from continuing toward Prague Castle, which would have entered the striking theatres.

Civic Forum representatives negotiated unofficially with Adamec without Havel, and Adamec was sympathetic to the students' demands. However, he was outvoted in a special cabinet meeting the same day. The government, in an official statement, made no concessions.

Civic Forum added a demand: the abolition of the "ruling position" of the Communist Party from the Constitution. Non-Communist newspapers published information that contradicted the Communist interpretation. The first mass demonstration in Prague (100,000 people) and the first demonstrations in Bratislava occurred.

=== 21 November ===
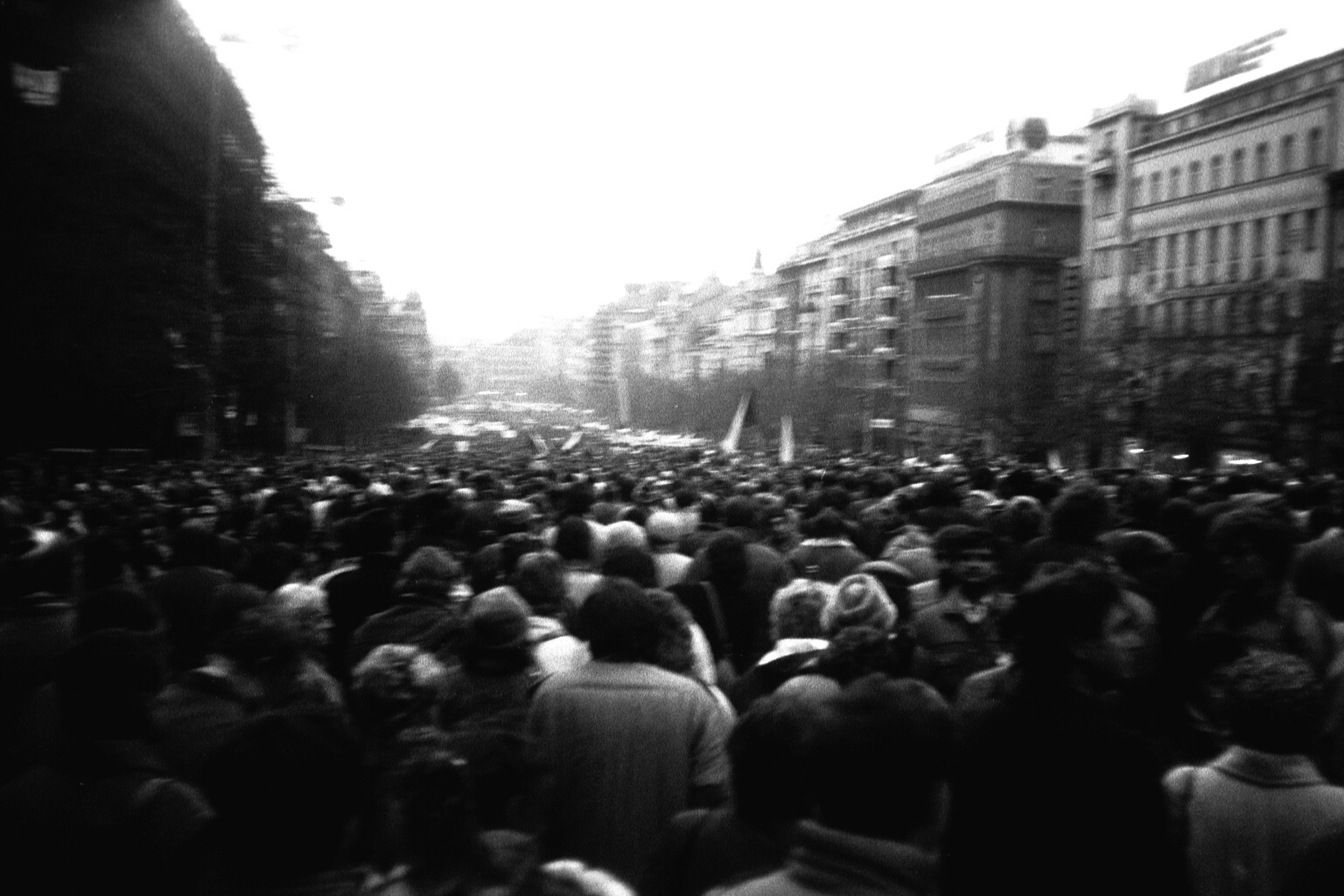
People on the Wenceslas Square in Prague

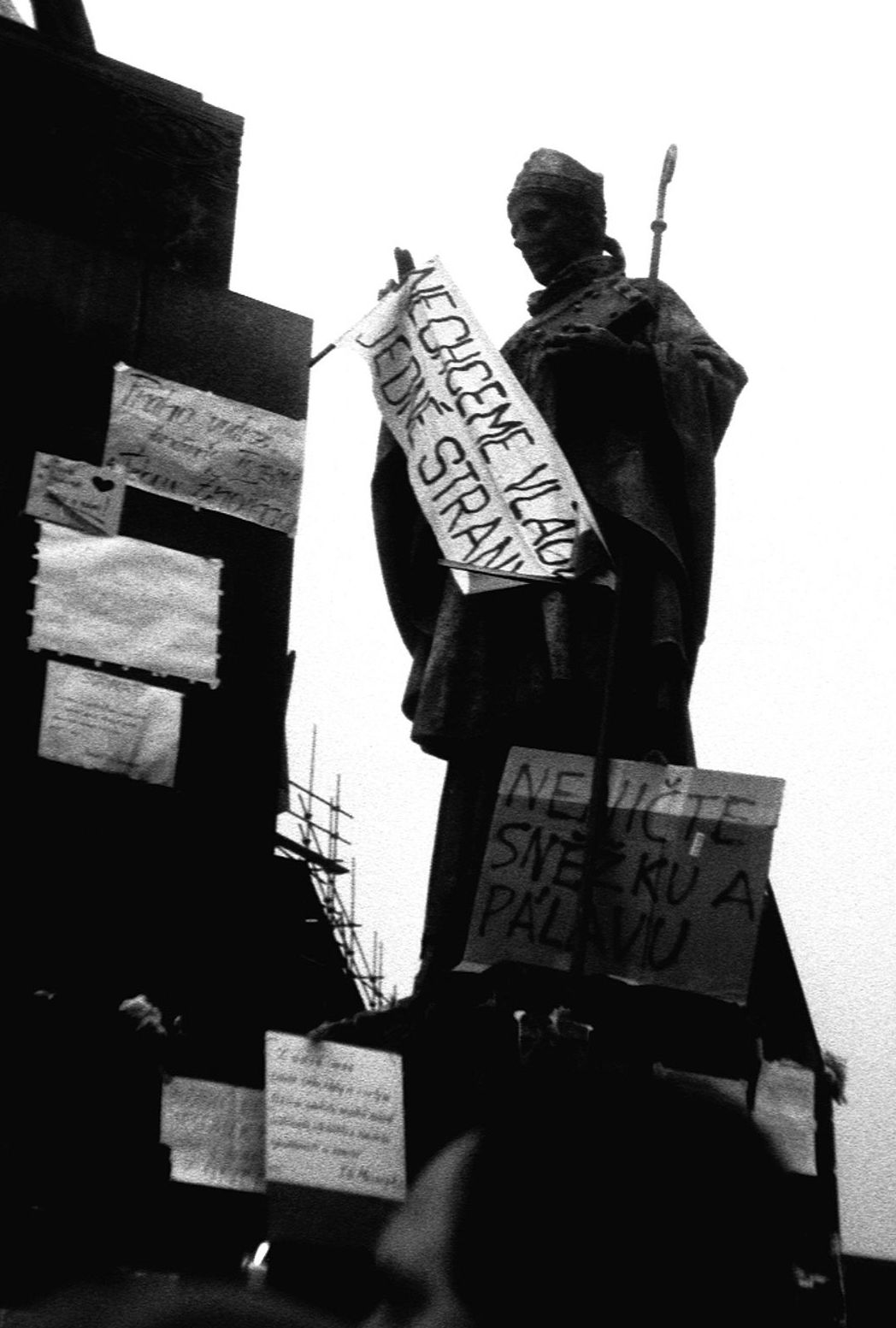
A statue of Saint Adalbert of Prague with a streamer and banners

The first official meeting of the Civic Forum with the Prime Minister took place. The Prime Minister agreed to personally guarantee that no violence would be used against the people; however he would "protect socialism, about which no discussion is possible". An organised mass demonstration took place in Wenceslas Square in central Prague (demonstrations recurred there throughout the following days). Actors and students travelled to factories inside and outside Prague to gain support for their colleagues in other cities.

A mass demonstration erupted in Hviezdoslav Square in downtown Bratislava (in the following days, it moved to the Square of the Slovak National Uprising). The students presented demands and asked the people to participate in the general strike planned for Monday, 27 November. A separate demonstration demanded the release of the political prisoner Ján Čarnogurský (later Prime Minister of Slovakia) in front of the Palace of Justice. Alexander Dubček addressed this demonstration – his first appearance during the Velvet Revolution. As a result, Čarnogurský was released on 23 November. Further demonstrations followed in all major cities of Czechoslovakia.

Cardinal František Tomášek, the Roman Catholic primate of the Bohemian lands, declared his support for the students and issued a declaration criticising the current government's policies. For the first time during the Velvet Revolution, the "radical" demand to abolish the article of the Constitution establishing the "leading role" of the Communist Party was expressed by Ľubomír Feldek at a meeting of Public Against Violence.

In the evening, Miloš Jakeš, the chairman of the Communist Party of Czechoslovakia, gave a special address on Federal Television. He said that order must be preserved, that socialism was the only alternative for Czechoslovakia, and criticised protest groups. Government officials, especially the Head of the Communist Party Miloš Jakeš, kept their hard-line position. During the night, they had summoned 4,000 members of the "People's Militias" (Lidové milice, a paramilitary organisation subordinated directly to the Communist Party) to Prague to crush the protests, but called them off.

=== 22 November ===
Civic Forum announced a two-hour general strike for Monday, 27 November. The first live reports from the demonstration in Wenceslas Square appeared on Federal Television (and were quickly cut off, after one of the participants denounced the present government in favour of Alexander Dubček).

Striking students forced the representatives of the Slovak government and of the Communist Party of Slovakia to participate in a dialogue, in which the official representatives were immediately put on the defensive. Employees of the Slovak section of the Federal Television required the leaders of the Federal Television to provide true information on the events in the country; otherwise they would initiate a strike of TV employees. Uncensored live reports from demonstrations in Bratislava began.

=== 23 November ===
The evening news showed factory workers heckling Miroslav Štěpán, the Prague Communist Secretary. The military informed the Communist leadership of its readiness to act (ultimately, it was never used against demonstrators). The military and the Ministry of Defense were preparing for actions against the opposition. Immediately after the meeting, however, the Minister of Defence delivered a TV address announcing that the army would never undertake action against the people and called for an end to demonstrations.

=== 24 November ===
The entire Presidium, including General Secretary Miloš Jakeš, resigned, and Karel Urbánek, a more moderate Communist, was named General Secretary. Federal Television showed pictures from 17 November for the first time and presented the first television address of Václav Havel, dealing mostly with the planned general strike. Czechoslovak TV and Radio announced that they would join the general strike. A discussion with representatives of the opposition was broadcast by the Slovak section of Federal Television. The opposition was represented by Ján Budaj, Fedor Gál and Vladimír Ondruš, while the Communists were represented by Štefan Chudoba (director of Bratislava automotive company), Peter Weiss (secretary of the Institute of Marx-Leninism of the Communist party of Slovakia) and the director of Steelworks Košice. It was the first free discussion on Czechoslovak television since its inception. As a result, the editorial staff of Slovak newspapers started to join the opposition.

=== 25 November ===
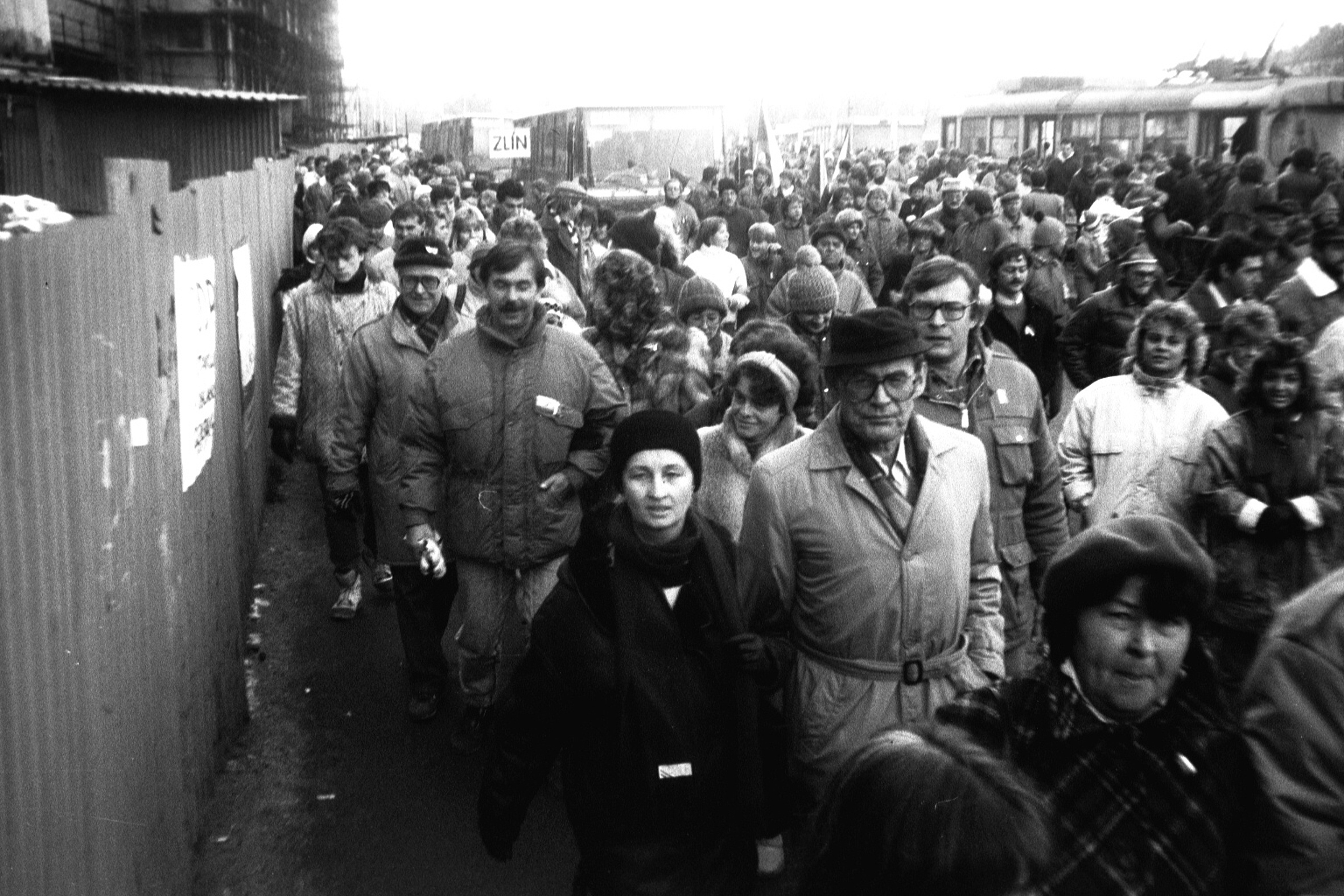
25 November, people flow from the Prague cathedral (where ended a mass in honour of canonisation of Agnes of Bohemia) and from the metro station Hradčanská to Letná Plain.

The new Communist leadership held a press conference, including Miroslav Štěpán while excluding Ladislav Adamec, but did not address the demands of the demonstrators. Later that day, Štěpán resigned as Prague Secretary. The number of participants in the regular anti-government demonstration in Prague-Letná reached an estimated 800,000 people. Demonstrations in Bratislava peaked at around 100,000 participants.

=== 26 November ===
Prime Minister Adamec met with Havel for the first time. The editorial staff of Slovakia's Pravda, the central newspaper of the Communist Party of Slovakia, joined the opposition.

=== 27 November ===
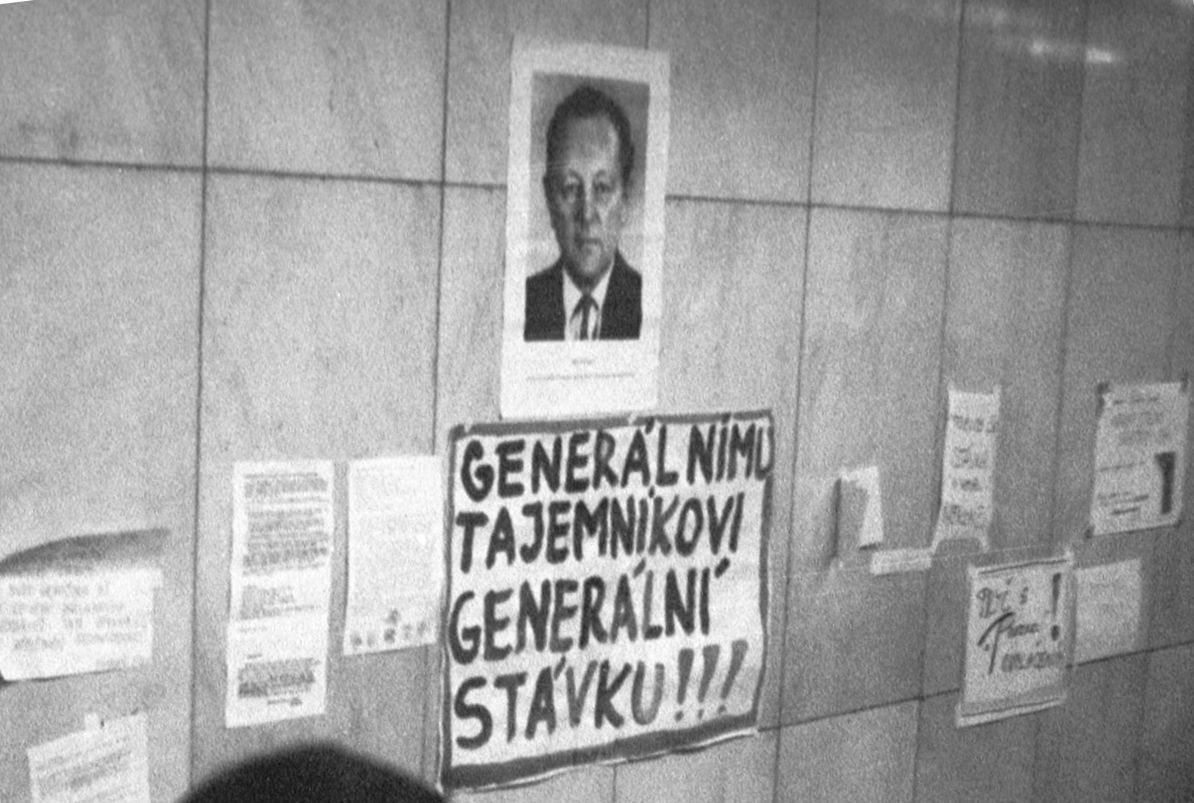
"To the general secretary – a general strike!!!" An appeal with portrait of Miloš Jakeš, who resigned on 24 November

A successful two-hour general strike led by the civic movements strengthened what were at first a set of moderate demands into cries for a new government. The strike took place throughout the country between 12:00 and 14:00, supported by a reported 75% of the population. The Ministry of Culture released anti-Communist literature for public checkouts in libraries, effectively ending decades of censorship. Civic Forum demonstrated its capacity to disrupt the political order and thereby establish itself as the legitimate voice of the nation in negotiations with the state. The civic movements mobilised support for the general strike.

=== 28 November ===
The Federal Assembly deleted the provision in the constitution referring to the "leading role" of the Communist Party, officially ending Communist rule in Czechoslovakia.

=== 10 December ===
President Gustáv Husák swore in the first government in 41 years that was not dominated by the Communist Party. He resigned shortly afterward.

== Aftermath ==
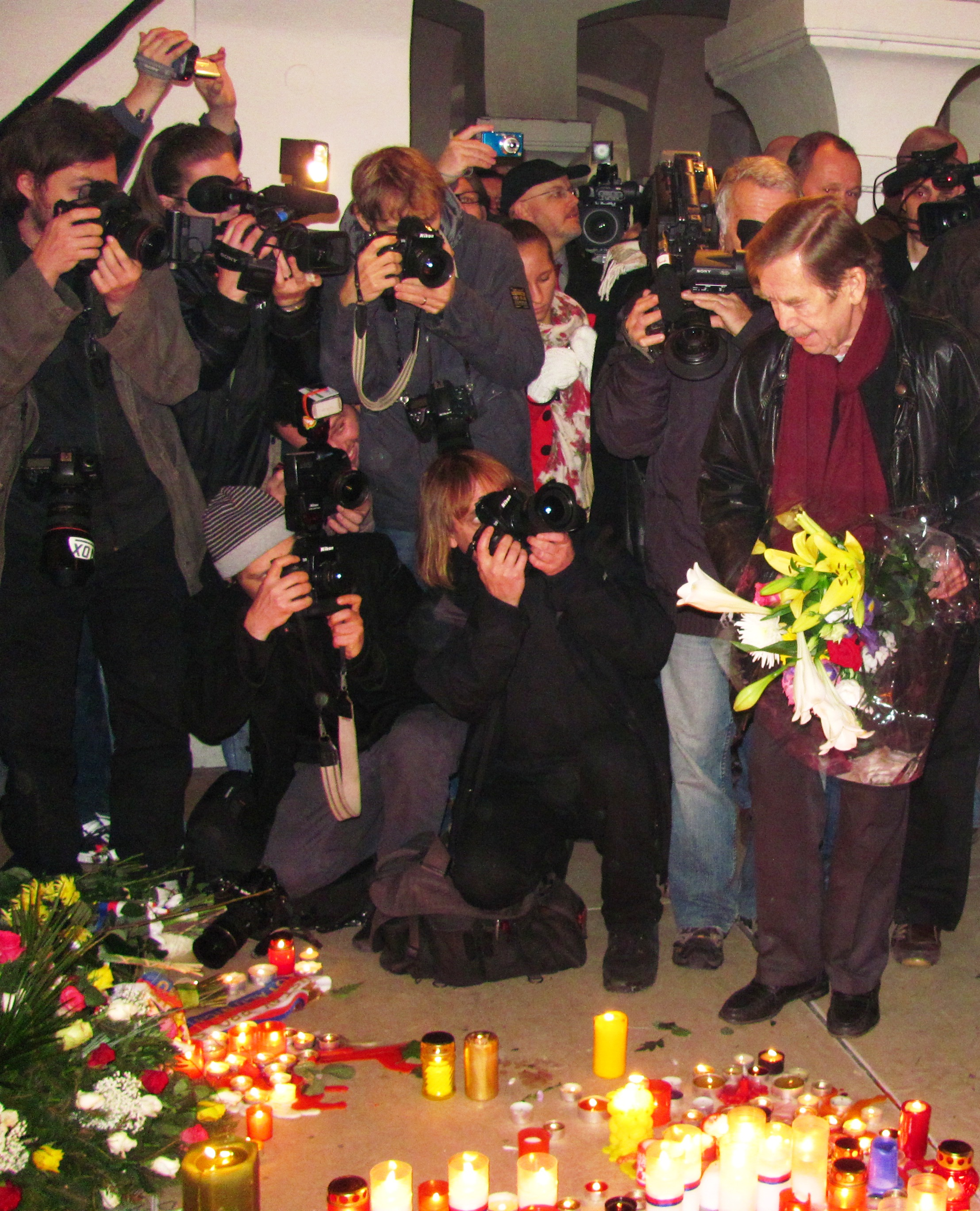
21st anniversary of the Velvet Revolution – former President Václav Havel (right, with flowers) at the Memorial at Národní Street in Prague

The victory of the revolution was topped off by the election of rebel playwright and human rights activist Václav Havel as President of Czechoslovakia on 29 December 1989. The event was highly choreographed and symbolically significant, including on account of with religious elements, as historian Martin Wein has analyzed in detail.

Within weeks, Havel negotiated the removal of all Soviet troops (approx. 73,500) from Czechoslovakia. As per the agreement, the Soviet troops departed within months. Free elections held in June 1990 legitimised this government and set the stage for addressing the remnants of the Communist party's power and the legacy of the Communist period.

The main threat to political stability and the success of Czechoslovakia's shift to democracy appeared likely to come from ethnic conflicts between the Czechs and the Slovaks, which resurfaced in the post-Communist period. However, there was a general consensus to move toward a market economy, so in early 1990, the President and his top economic advisers decided to liberalise prices, push de-monopolisation and privatise the economy. The end of Communism meant the end of life-long employment, and a subsequent increase in unemployment. To combat this, the government implemented unemployment benefits and a minimum wage. The outcome of the transition to democracy and a market economy would depend on the extent to which developments outside the country facilitated or hindered the process of change. A notable development was an increase in freedom of religion, and renewed ties to the Vatican and Israel.

== Naming and categorisation ==
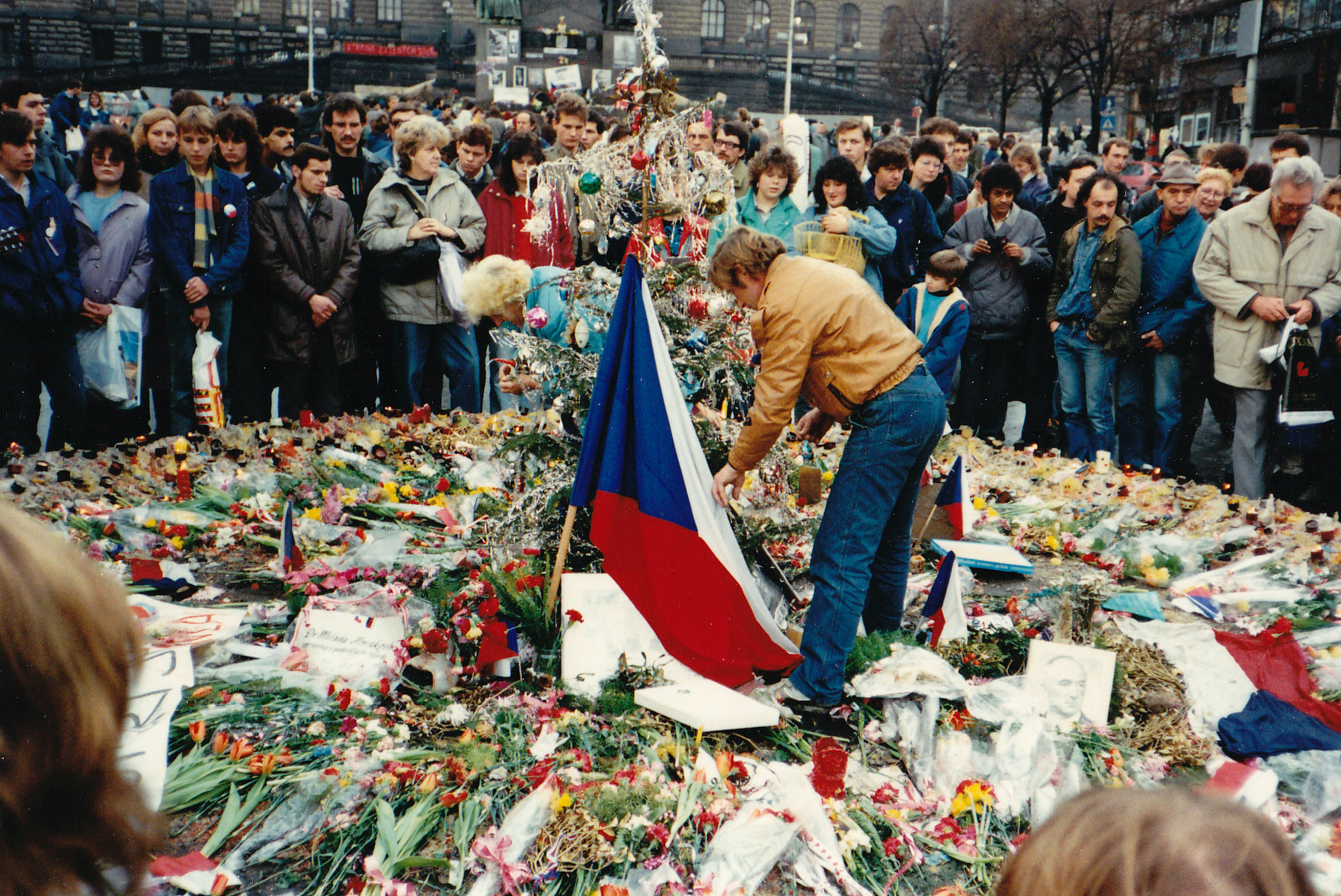
Václav Havel honouring the deaths of those who took part in the 1939 Prague protest.

The term Velvet Revolution was coined by Rita Klímová, the dissidents' English translator who later became the ambassador to the United States. The term was used internationally to describe the revolution, although the Czechs also used the term internally. After the dissolution of Czechoslovakia in 1993, Slovakia used the term Gentle Revolution, the term that Slovaks used for the revolution from the beginning. The Czech Republic continues to refer to the event as the Velvet Revolution.

Theorists of revolutions, such as Jaroslav Krejčí, have argued that the "Velvet Revolution" was not, in fact, a true revolution because a revolution by definition accomplishes change by means of illegitimate violence. Contending theories of revolution argue that the Velvet Revolution is a legitimate revolution because it is a "revolutionary situation" of contested sovereignty that led to a transfer of power ("revolutionary outcome").

The Velvet Revolution is an early example of "colour revolutions" around the world.

== Ideals of the revolution ==
Non-violent protesters with flowers face armed policemen

In the months leading up to and during the revolution, citizens dispersed ideas using flyers distributed en masse. Hundreds of discrete flyers with varying messages were printed, but most shared the same ideals. In the summer of 1989, one of the most widely circulated documents was "The Eight Rules of Dialogue", which advocated for truth, understanding and empathy, informed and respectful discussion, abstaining from ad hominem attacks, and an open mind. Other documents focused less on communication techniques and more on ideals. Democracy, freedom, nonviolence, fairness, and humanness were prevalent themes, as well as self-organisation, political representation, and improved working conditions.

== External factors ==
The events of November 1989 confirmed that outside factors were significant catalysts for the downfall of Communism in Czechoslovakia. Therefore, the transformations in Poland and Hungary and the collapse of the regime in East Germany, both of which could be traced to the new attitude of the Soviets toward East Europe, encouraged Czechs and Slovaks to take to the streets to win their freedom. However, national factors, including the economic and political crisis and the actions of groups and individuals working towards a transformation, destabilised support for the system. Foreign broadcasting played a significant role in shaping public awareness during the late 1980s. Radio Free Europe, Voice of America, the BBC World Service and other Western broadcasters provided uncensored information about developments in Czechoslovakia and the wider Eastern Bloc. Their reporting was widely followed despite state jamming efforts. Among the journalists covering Czechoslovakia for these outlets was Jolyon Naegele of Voice of America, whose interviews with dissidents and analysis of political developments reached large audiences inside the country.

== Pace of change ==
The State's reaction to the strikes demonstrated that while global isolation produced pressures for political, social, and economic change, the events that followed could not be predetermined. Hardly anyone thought that the Communist State could collapse so quickly. Striking students and theatres did not seem likely to intimidate a state that was able to suppress any sort of demonstration. This "popular" phase of the revolution, was followed by victories made possible by the Civic Forum's successful mobilisation for the general strike on 27 November, which established its legitimacy to speak for the nation in negotiations with the state. The mass demonstrations that followed 17 November led to the resignation of the Party leadership of Miloš Jakeš, the removal of the Party from its leading role and the creation of the non-Communist government. Supporters of the revolution had to take instant responsibility for running the government, in addition to establishing essential reforms in political organisation and values, economic structure and policies and foreign policy.

== Jingled keys ==
One element of the demonstrations of the Velvet Revolution was the jingling of keys to signify support. The practice had a double meaning – it symbolized the unlocking of doors and was the demonstrators' way of telling the Communists, "Goodbye, it's time to go home."

A commemorative 2 Euro coin was issued by Slovakia on 17 November 2009 to mark the 20th anniversary. The coin depicts a bell with a key adjoining the clapper. Ursula K. Le Guin wrote a short story, "Unlocking the Air", in which the jingling of keys played a central role in the liberation of a fictional country called Orsinia.

== See also ==
- Civic Forum and Public Against Violence (political movements that played major role in the revolution)
- Dissolution of Czechoslovakia (peaceful dissolution of Czechoslovakia a few years later in 1993)
- Eastern Bloc emigration and defection
- Civil resistance
- Revolutions of 1989
- Monday demonstrations in East Germany
- Armenian Velvet Revolution
- Georgian Rose Revolution
- Ukrainian Orange Revolution
- Civilian-based defense
