= Klas =

Klas or KLAS may refer to:

== People ==
- Claes, a given name in Scandinavia
- Anna Klas, Estonian pianist
- Dhoraso Klas (born 2001), Surinamese footballer
- Eri Klas (1939–2016), Estonian conductor
- Jan Klas, Czech aviation expert
- Joannes Klas, American sister of the Sisters of Saint Francis
- Patrick Klas (born 1975), Dutch judoka

== Other uses ==
- Klas (restaurant), a Czech restaurant in Cicero, Illinois, which operated from 1922 to 2016
- KLAS-TV, a television station (channel 8) licensed to Las Vegas, Nevada, United States
- The ICAO airport code for Harry Reid International Airport, in Las Vegas, Nevada, United States
- Kumon Leysin Academy of Switzerland, a private high school in Leysin, Switzerland
