= Martin Šmíd =

Non-existent Czech student

Martin Šmíd was a fictitious Czechoslovak university student who was supposedly killed in the police attack on 17 November 1989 student demonstration in Prague that launched Czechoslovakia's Velvet Revolution. The rumour of Šmíd's death was spread by Drahomíra Dražská, a porter at a student dormitory in the city's Troja district. The dissident Charter 77 activist Petr Uhl believed her story and passed it along to Radio Free Europe, the BBC and Voice of America, who broadcast it. The news of a student's death shocked many, and the rumour is thought to have contributed to the fall of the Czechoslovak Socialist Republic.

The Martin Šmíd in question was allegedly a student of the Faculty of Mathematics and Physics at Charles University. Two students with that name attended the school at the time, both in their second year at the university, but nothing happened to either of them on November 17. One did not attend the student demonstration, and the other left it just before the police attack. After the story spread across the country, the public reaction was one of outrage. The government showed the two Martin Šmíds and interviewed them on television, but people did not believe their assertion that the story was fictitious. Massive demonstrations began across the weekend and the government responded by arresting Uhl for "spreading false rumours".

Drahomíra Dražská's actions, and her motivation for them, have never been fully made clear. The most likely explanation is that she invented the story of Šmíd's death, and Dražská herself has on several occasions corroborated this claim. Following the Velvet Revolution, a conspiracy theory began to spread that the incident had been a secret police operation. According to journalist Victor Sebestyen, the StB "faked the 'death' of Martin Šmíd in order to create a groundswell of popular anger that would remove General Secretary Jakeš and other hardliners, and replace them with Gorbachev-type reformers." Sebestyen maintained that Ludvík Zifčák, a junior StB agent who had infiltrated the student movement, fell down and played dead during the November 17 demonstrations in Wenceslas Square and that Dražská, whom Sebestyen also believed to be an StB agent, then passed on to Uhl the story that "Šmíd" had been killed.

However, an investigation by a committee of the Czechoslovak parliament found no evidence of these claims, and Dražská's involvement with the StB was considered to be highly unlikely. Furthermore, following the events of 17 November, Zifčák continued his undercover work, casting doubts on his role as Martin Šmíd since the operation would be compromised had he been recognized.

== See also ==
- Đorđe Martinović incident
