= 2011 Kladno by-election =

2011 Czech senate by-election
18–26 March
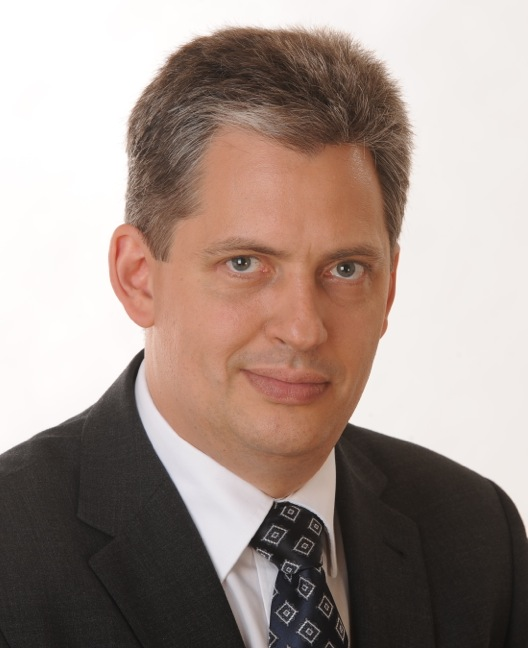

	First party	Second party
Candidate	Jiří Dienstbier Jr.	Dan Jiránek
Party	ČSSD	ODS
Popular vote	13,505	7,227
Percentage	65.1%	34.9%

A by-election for the Kladno Senate seat was held in the Czech Republic in March 2011. The first round was held on 18–19 March while second was held on 25–26 March 2011. It was held after death of incumbent senator Jiří Dienstbier. The election was won by his son Jiří Dienstbier Jr. who defeated Dan Jiránek.

== Results ==
Candidate	Party	First round		Second round	
Candidate	Party	Votes	%	Votes	%
Jiří Dienstbier Jr.	Czech Social Democratic Party	12,088	44.27	13,505	65.14
Dan Jiránek	Civic Democratic Party	7,422	27.18	7,227	34.85
Zdeněk Levý	Communist Party of Bohemia and Moravia	2,435	8.91		
Luděk Kvapil	TOP 09	2,053	7.51		
Jana Bobošíková	Sovereignty – Jana Bobošíková Bloc	1,993	7.29		
Karel Protiva	Club of Committed Non-Party Members	571	2.09		
Miroslav Rovenský	Christian and Democratic Union – Czechoslovak People's Party	346	1.26		
Ivo Vašíček	Czech Pirate Party	205	0.75		
Milan Vodička	Party of Free Citizens	191	0.69		
