= Hungarian Group of Revolutionary Communists =

Hungarian Group of Revolutionary Communists Magyar Forradalmi Kommunisták Csoportja
- Founded: November 1967
- Dissolved: January 1968
- Ideology: Maoism; Marxism-Leninism

The Hungarian Group of Revolutionary Communists (Hungarian: Magyar Forradalmi Kommunisták Csoportja) was a dissident Maoist organisation, formed by a group of left-wing university students in opposition to the policies of János Kádár and the Hungarian Socialist Workers' Party. The leaders of the group were arrested within months of the group's formation and were prosecuted for their dissident activities in what became known in Kádár-era Hungary as the "Maoist conspiracy".

== Background ==
=== Eötvös Loránd University ===
In 1964, a group of left-wing students who were disillusioned with the state-sanctioned Hungarian Young Communist League (Magyar Kommunista Ifjúsági Szövetség, KISZ) began to organise study groups on Marxism, without the approval of the KISZ. Among these students were György Pór, Sándor Bencze, and Miklós Haraszti, who would later become key defendants in the "Maoist conspiracy". Many students associated with these unapproved study groups went to the Chinese embassy in Budapest to obtain copies of Quotations from Chairman Mao Tse-tung.

=== Vietnam Solidarity Committee ===
In 1965, the KISZ formed the Vietnam Solidarity Committee (VSC), which György Por and his friends joined. The VSC organised protests in front of the American embassy and distributed leaflets in front of the American pavilion at the 1966 Budapest International Fair. Even though the KISZ supported North Vietnam, their approved slogans were relatively moderate, such as "Peace for Vietnam!". In contrast, the Maoist students within the VSC expressed more militant slogans such as "Victory to the NLF!". This resulted in the KISZ disbanding the VSC in December 1966.

== Formation and activities ==
=== Formation ===
The Hungarian Group of Revolutionary Communists officially proclaimed their existence on the 50th anniversary of the October Revolution.

=== Ideology ===
In their program, titled "The Way of Revolution", the group declared their opposition to the Kádár regime, stating:

We make no secret of the fact that our political goal can only be reached by the violent overthrow of this bourgeois-bureaucratic regime masked by revisionism. The Great Proletarian Cultural Revolution in the People’s Republic of China reveals the way for us.

=== Activities ===
In January 1968, the Hungarian Group of Revolutionary Communists organised a rally outside the American embassy in Budapest, which was attended by 200 protestors, including international students from China and Africa. The rally ended in violence, with Molotov cocktails thrown at the embassy gates, cars of the embassy staff being torched, and protestors clashing with security forces.

== Suppression ==
By late January 1968, members of the Hungarian Group of Revolutionary Communists began to be arrested. The trial of the group's members took place from May to June 1968. Only three of the group's members were given prison sentences while eight others were given suspended sentences.

== See also ==
- Movement of Revolutionary Youth
- Goulash Communism
