= Jan Chvojka =

Czech politician (born 1980)

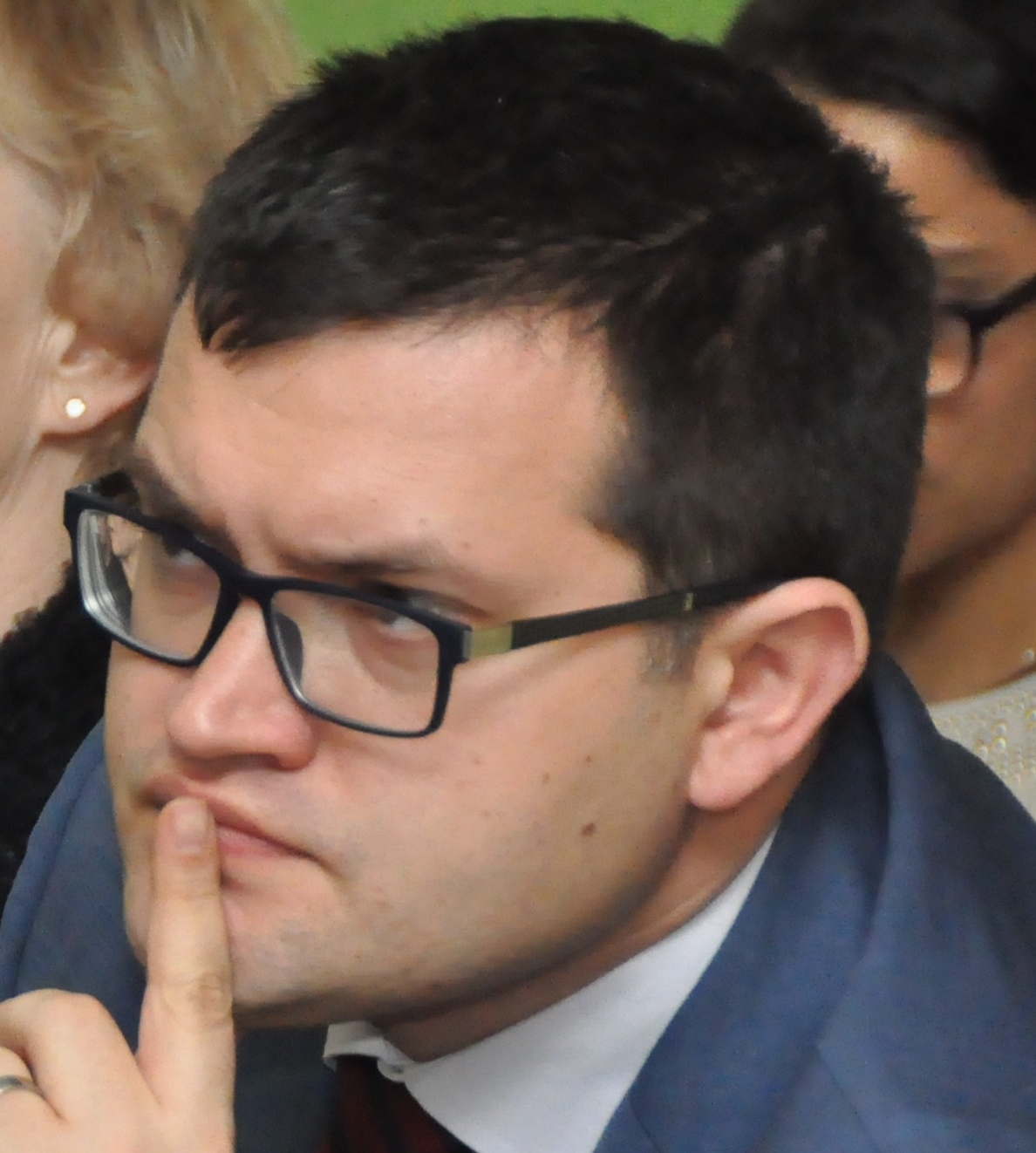
- Chvojka in 2017

Minister for Human Rights and Equal Opportunities
- In office 1 December 2016 – 13 December 2017
- Prime Minister: Bohuslav Sobotka
- Preceded by: Jiří Dienstbier

Chairman of the Government Legislative Council
- In office 5 December 2016 – 13 December 2017
- Prime Minister: Bohuslav Sobotka
- Preceded by: Jiří Dienstbier Jr.
- Succeeded by: Robert Pelikán

Member of the Chamber of Deputies
- In office 29 May 2010 – 21 October 2021

Personal details
- Born: 17 December 1980 (age 45) Hlinsko, Czechoslovakia
- Party: SOCDEM (2007–2025)
- Children: 3
- Education: Charles University; Masaryk University

Jan Chvojka (born 17 December 1980) is a Czech politician and former member of the Chamber of Deputies, from 2017 until 2021. He served as Minister of Human Rights between December 2016 and 2017.
