= Stuha =

STUHA (abbreviation for Studentské hnutí – Czech: student movement; also the word for 'ribbon', referencing the Czechoslovak tricolour) was an alternative, independent student movement in the final phase of the Communist regime in Czechoslovakia. It was formed by Prague students in the early autumn of 1989. The movement was the catalyst that mobilized the university students, culminating in the demonstration and march at Albertov, and then on to the city centre, on 17 November 1989, launching the Velvet Revolution.

== History ==
The Stuha movement was formed in summer 1989, specifically on 28 September at the initiative of former classmates of a technical school (Střední průmyslová škola strojnická in Betlémská ulice, Prague) Marek Benda and Jiří Dienstbier Jr. Other now well-known figures who took part in the formation of the group were Šimon Pánek, Martin Klíma and Jan Vidím. The aim of the movement was to push for visible democratic change in the Communist régime. With the collapse of the régime following the demonstrations, and with the emergence of new problems and topics and the dramatic differentiation of the new situation, the work of Stuha gradually lost importance and eventually came to a halt in the early weeks of 1990. The differentiation of the politics and ideologies of the main actors, as well as their getting involved in specific political activities, also led to the winding down of the movement. Three of the main founders soon became deputies to the Federal Assembly (the Czechoslovak parliament).

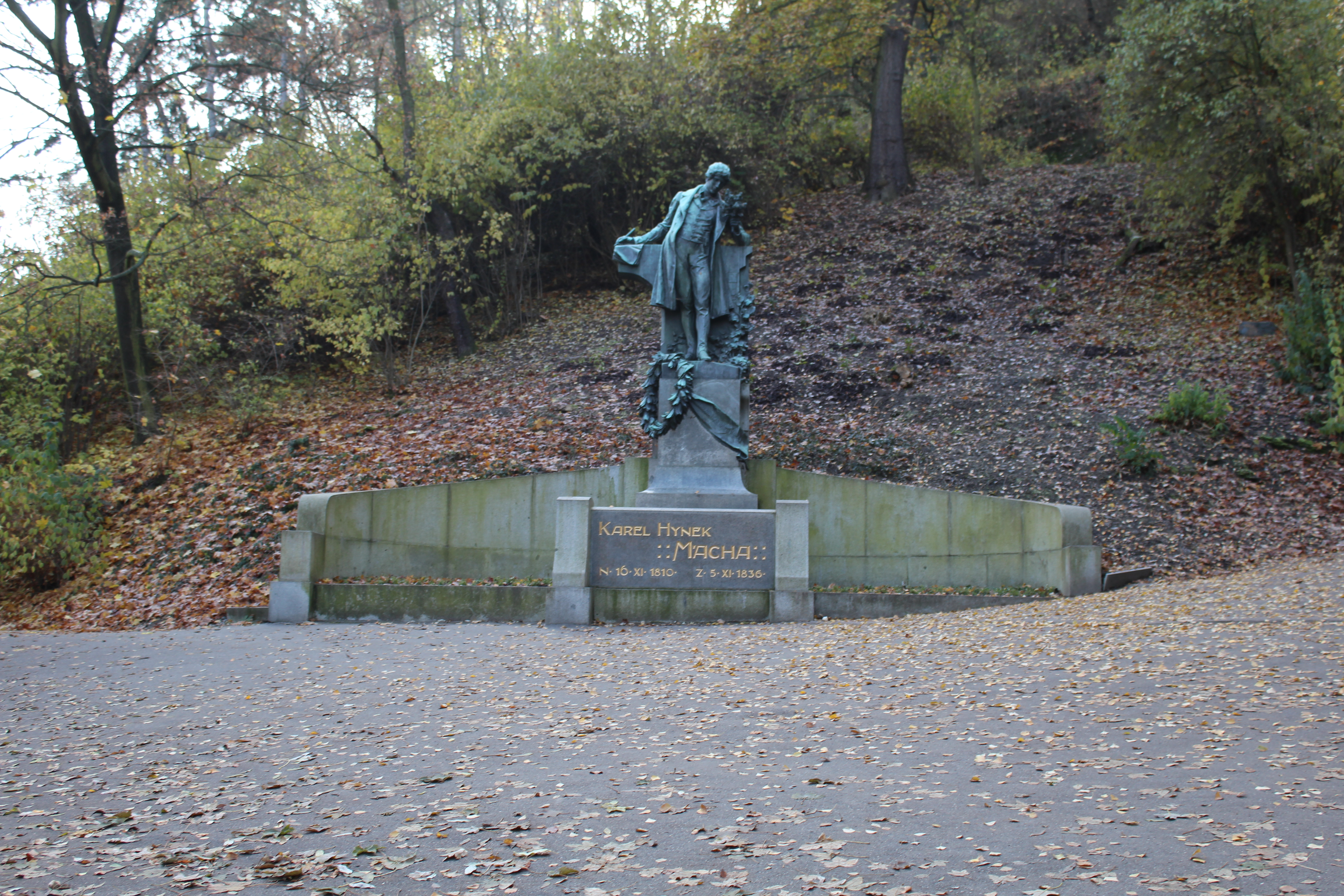
Mácha monument in November

Before that the leading figures of the STUHA movement had met on 9 November 1989 (the day the great 19th century Czech poet, Karel Hynek Mácha, is traditionally commemorated at his monument in Petřín park, Prague), with the aim of getting in touch with the leaders of the Socialist Union of Youth (Socialistický svaz mládeže – SSM) and winning over SSM members who were willing to take part in a mass demonstration for democratization of the régime. This new strategy became the source of conflict within Stuha, but was ultimately pushed through and contributed importantly to the success of the movement for democratic change.

It was very likely STUHA that had considerable influence on the course of events during the student march from Albertov after speeches including the final one by Klíma up the hill to the Vyšehrad national cemetery and then, without permission, to the centre of Prague on the evening of 17 November 1989. And it is probably the moderation of this determined group that was reflected in the character and course of the first phase of the public demonstrations and their gradual radicalization. In November 1989, the secret police considered the activity of the Stuha movement to be very important and rather dangerous to the régime. The secret police monitored the role and work of Dienstbier, Benda, and Ladislav Lis, in organizing and moderating the demonstration at Albertov.

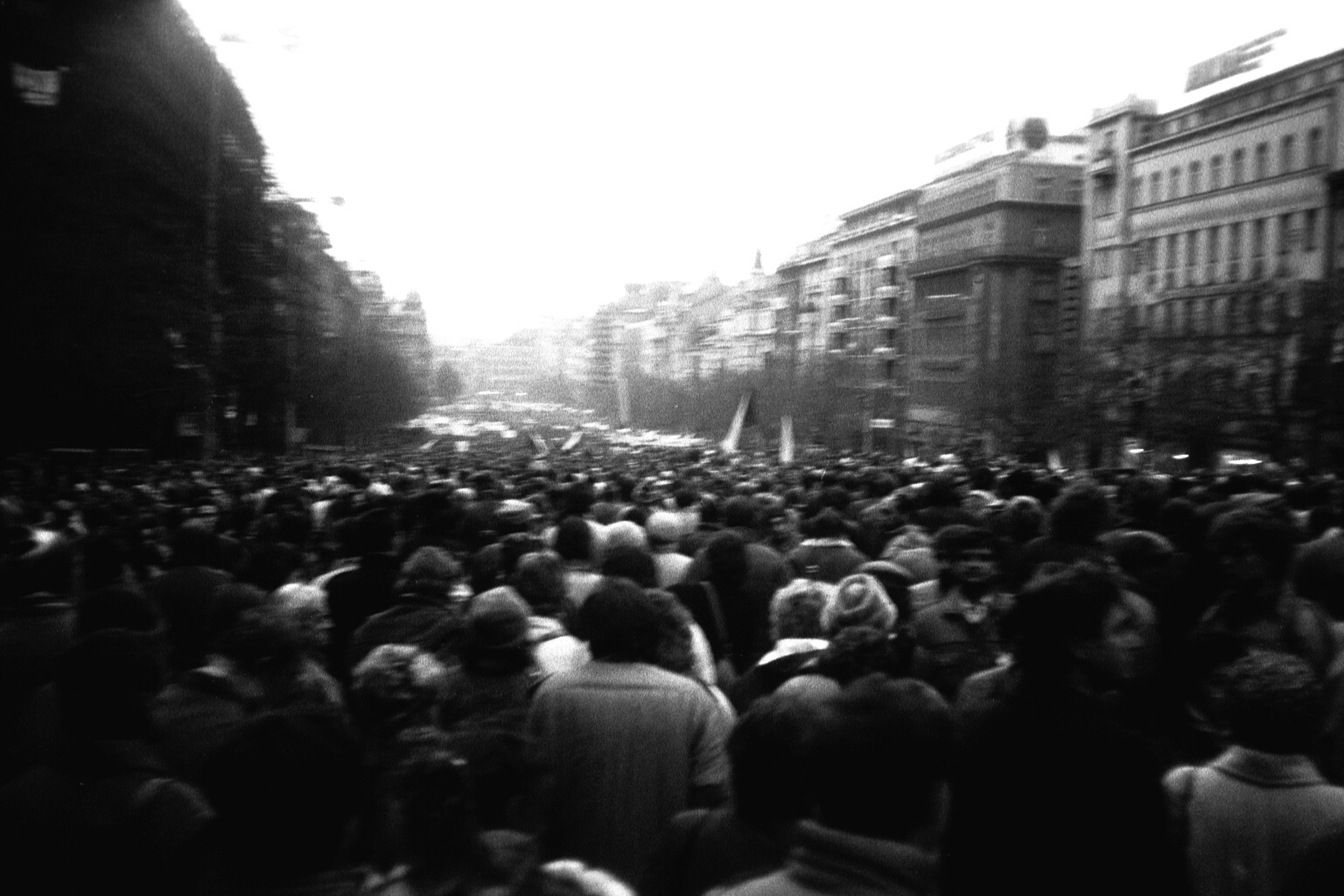
Demonstration on the Wenceslas Square, between 20–24 November

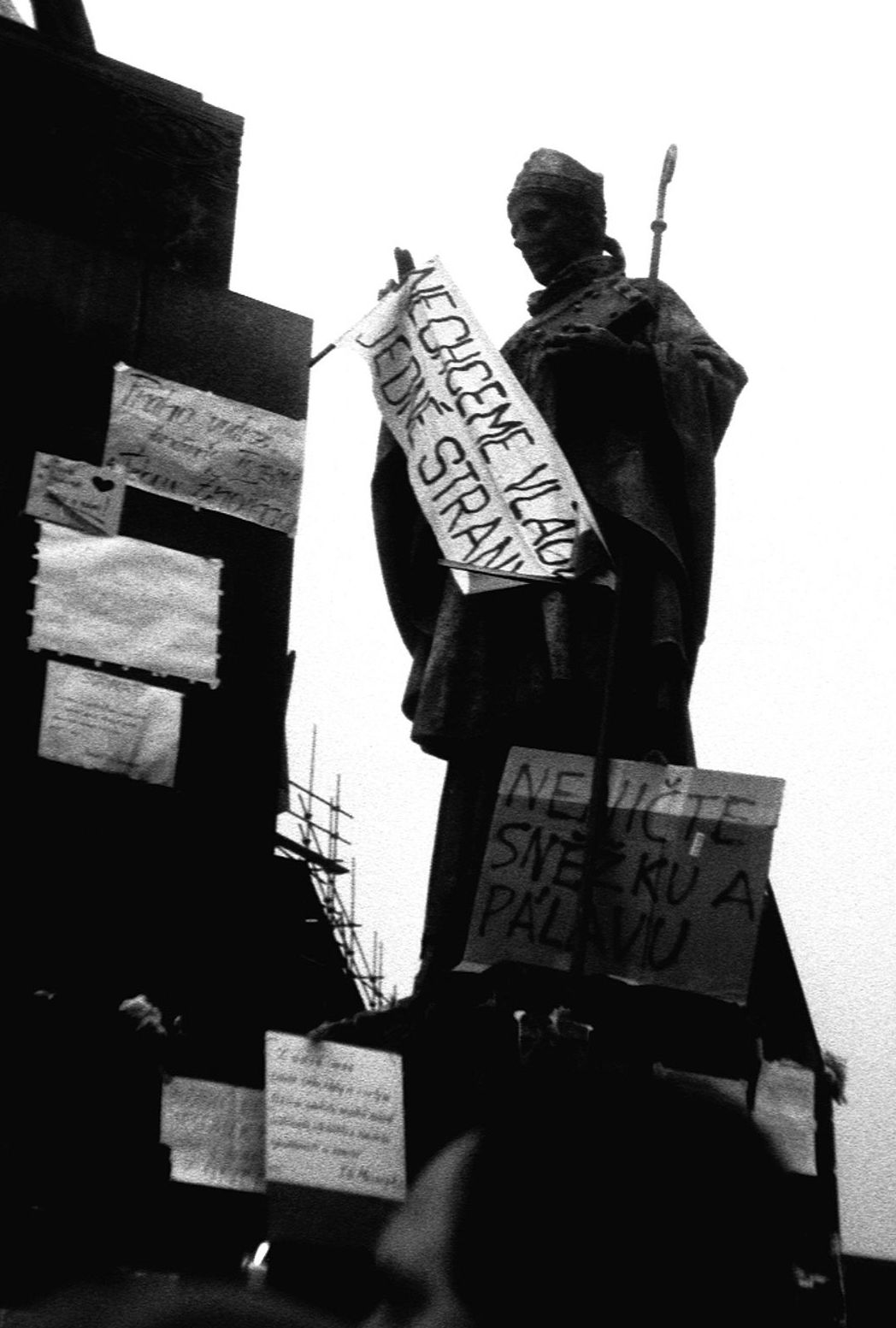
A statue of Saint Adalbert of Prague with a streamer and banners

== Aims and achievements ==
Among the important work of the STUHA movement was the awakening of the student body and its interest in civil liberties, human rights, and genuine democratization of the country. The aim was also to create another link between the dissident movement and students of what has popularly been called the 'grey zone' (people who did not support the régime but who did not openly come out against it).

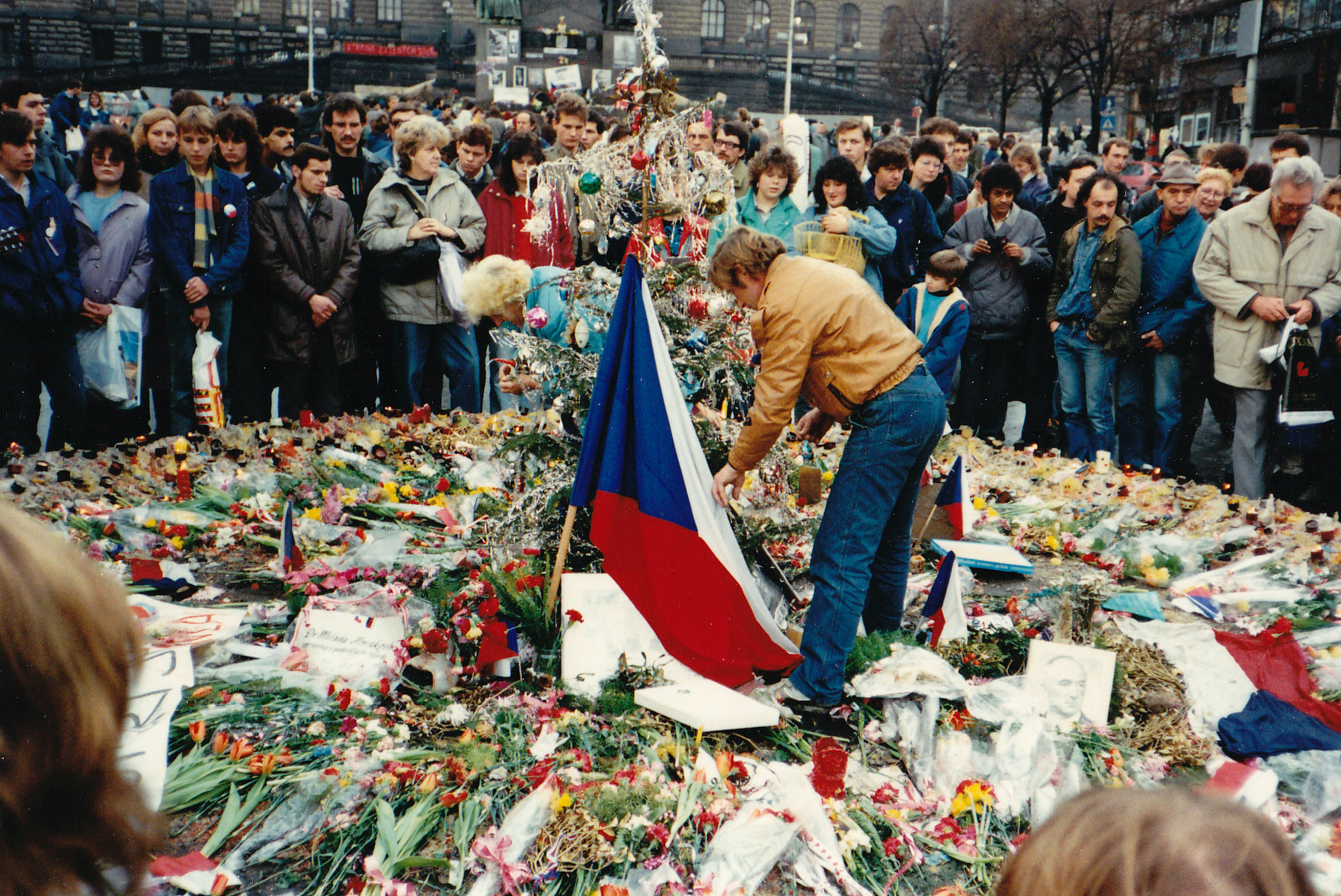
Václav Havel & peaceful Prague protest photo by Marc Dragul
