= Klas (restaurant) =

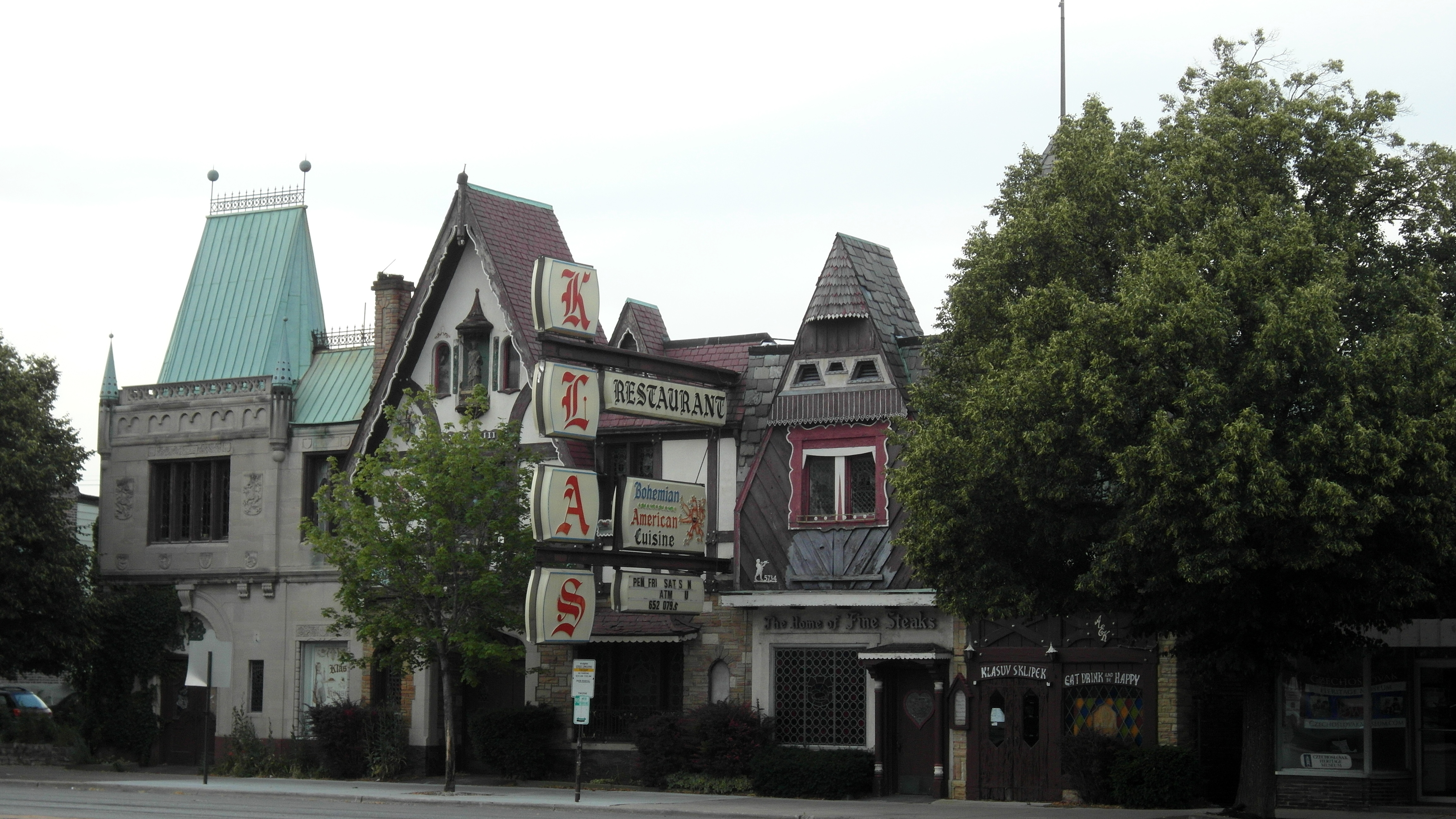

General information
- Location: 5734 W. Cermak Road, Cicero, Illinois
- Coordinates: 41°51′4.168″N 87°46′5.19″W
- Completed: 1922
- Demolished: 2022

Technical details
- Floor count: 2

Klas was a restaurant in Cicero, Illinois, founded in 1922 and shuttered in 2016, which specialized in Bohemian cuisine. The restaurant served numerous high ranking Czech and American officials, along with many other notable individuals, and served as an important institution for the Czech American community. The building was demolished in 2022.

== History ==
The restaurant was founded in 1922 by Adolph Klas, who was born in Plzeň and moved to the United States at age 26. Adolph Klas had previously worked at the Edgewater Beach Hotel, the Blackstone Hotel, and the Drake Hotel. The restaurant was redecorated in 1934, featuring the artwork of Mary Adamec and Albert Rohls. Russian singer and artist Gennadi Gordeyev, who fought against the Bolsheviks in the Russian Civil War, painted multiple murals that are inside the restaurant's Russian Room. The first floor bar room was rebuilt to replicate the appearance of a 14th Century Bohemian tap room. The restaurant's dining rooms were named after their respective decor, and included the Moravian Room, the Russian or Boyar Room, the George Washington Room, the Fountain Room, and the Garden Room, which overlooked a garden with a fountain and wishing well. The restaurant was elaborately decorated, with hand carved woodwork, a wrought-iron balcony, stained glass windows, historically themed paintings and murals, chandeliers, cuckoo clocks, and other European antiques and objects of art.

Adolph Klas died in 1962 and his widow Ella died in 1966. Ella Klas's brother, Charlie Hoch, would run the restaurant until 1978. In 1980, the restaurant was sold to Milena and Laddie Kindl and Jaroslav Kratky.

=== Notable guests ===
Klas has served President George H. W. Bush and several Czech presidents. Judy Baar Topinka launched her campaign for Governor of Illinois at Klas in 2005. In 2012, a reception in honor of the Prime Minister and Members of the Government of the Czech Republic was held at Klas, which was attended by Prime Minister of the Czech Republic Petr Nečas, First Deputy Prime Minister and Minister of Foreign Affairs Karel Schwarzenberg, Minister of Defense Alexandr Vondra, musician Ivan Král, and former United States Secretary of State Madeleine Albright. Other notable individuals who have dined at the restaurant include Kim Novak, Chicago Mayor Anton Cermak, and composer Sigmund Romberg.

=== Closure and efforts to save building ===
The restaurant closed in 2016. It was sold to developers in 2019, and faced demolition when the owner applied for a demolition permit. However, the demolition permit expired and it was put back on the market in 2021. In May 2021, Landmarks Illinois listed the building as one of Illinois's most endangered historic sites. A coalition of interested parties led by entrepreneur Marek Kutek, American Sokol President Jean Hruby, and immigration attorney Michael F. Jordan had an option to purchase the building by October 2, 2021, and raised money to purchase the building and ultimately restore it and reopen it as a museum, restaurant, banquet hall, and center for immigrant services. However, their efforts were unsuccessful and the building was demolished in late May and early June 2022.
