= Miroslav Štěpán =

Czech politician

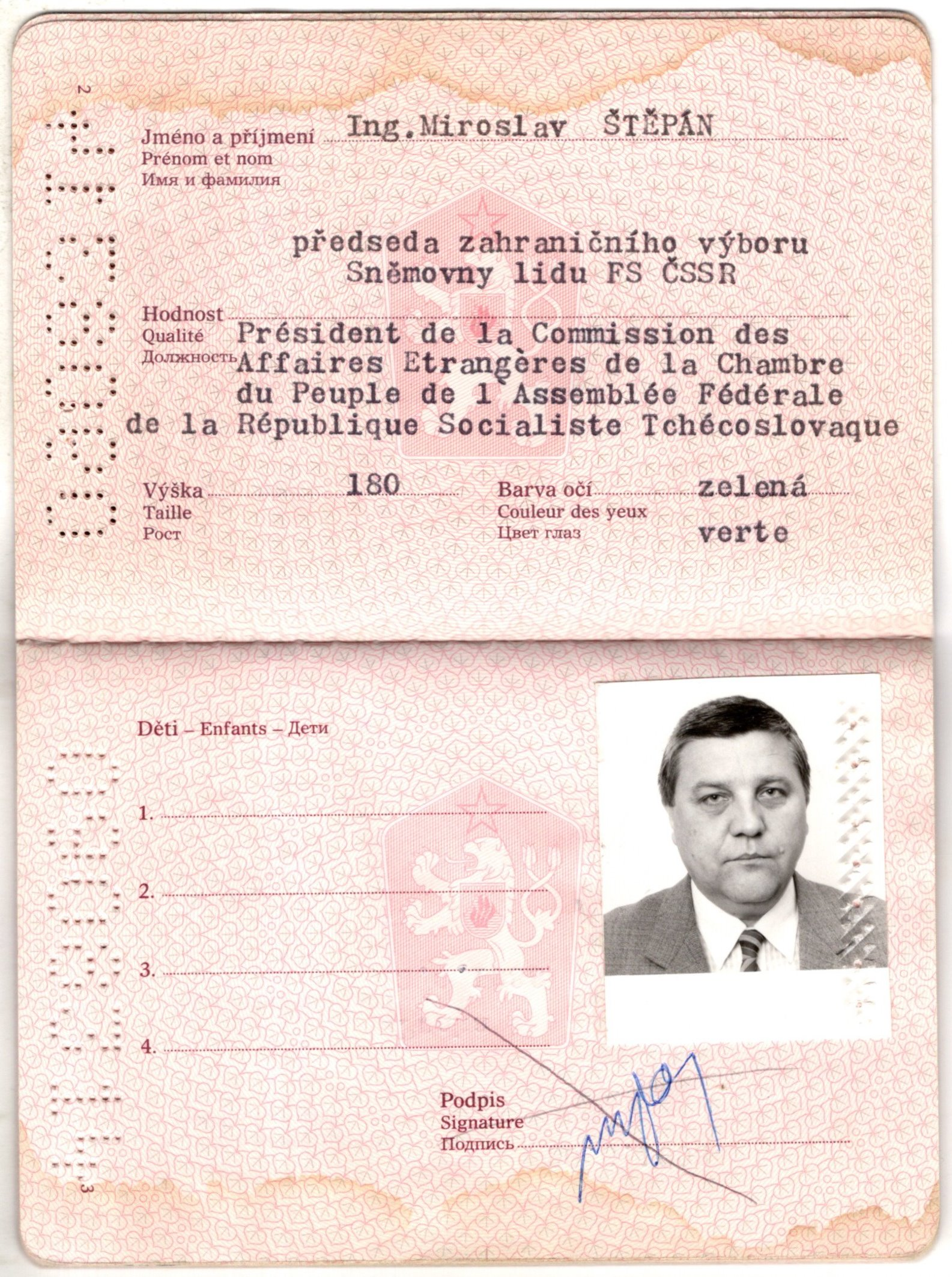
Miroslav Štěpán's passport photo

Miroslav Štěpán (5 August 1945 – 23 March 2014) was a Czech politician. He was a member of the Communist Party of Czechoslovakia. He was the Secretary of the Municipal Party Committee in Prague and a member of the Central Committee of the Communist Party of Czechoslovakia. He was born in Louny.

Štěpán died on 23 March 2014 from cancer in Prague, aged 68.
