= Ladislav Svoboda =

Czech medical doctor and politician (1938–2024)

Member of the Senate of the Czech Republic
- In office 23 November 1996 – 2 November 2008
- Preceded by: position established
- Succeeded by: Jiří Dienstbier
- Constituency: Senate District No. 30 – Kladno

Personal details
- Born: 25 December 1938
- Died: 13 January 2024 (aged 85)
- Party: ČSSD
- Education: Charles University
- Occupation: Medical doctor

Ladislav Svoboda (25 December 1938 – 13 January 2024) was a Czech medical doctor and politician. A member of the Czech Social Democratic Party, he served in the Senate from 1996 to 2008.

Before 1984, he was the director of the polyclinic of the Poldi company in Kladno. In 1984–2002, he worked as a medical doctor of the ice hockey club HC Kladno.

Svoboda died on 13 January 2024, at the age of 85.
