= Jiří Dienstbier Jr. =

Czech politician and lawyer

Jiří Dienstbier
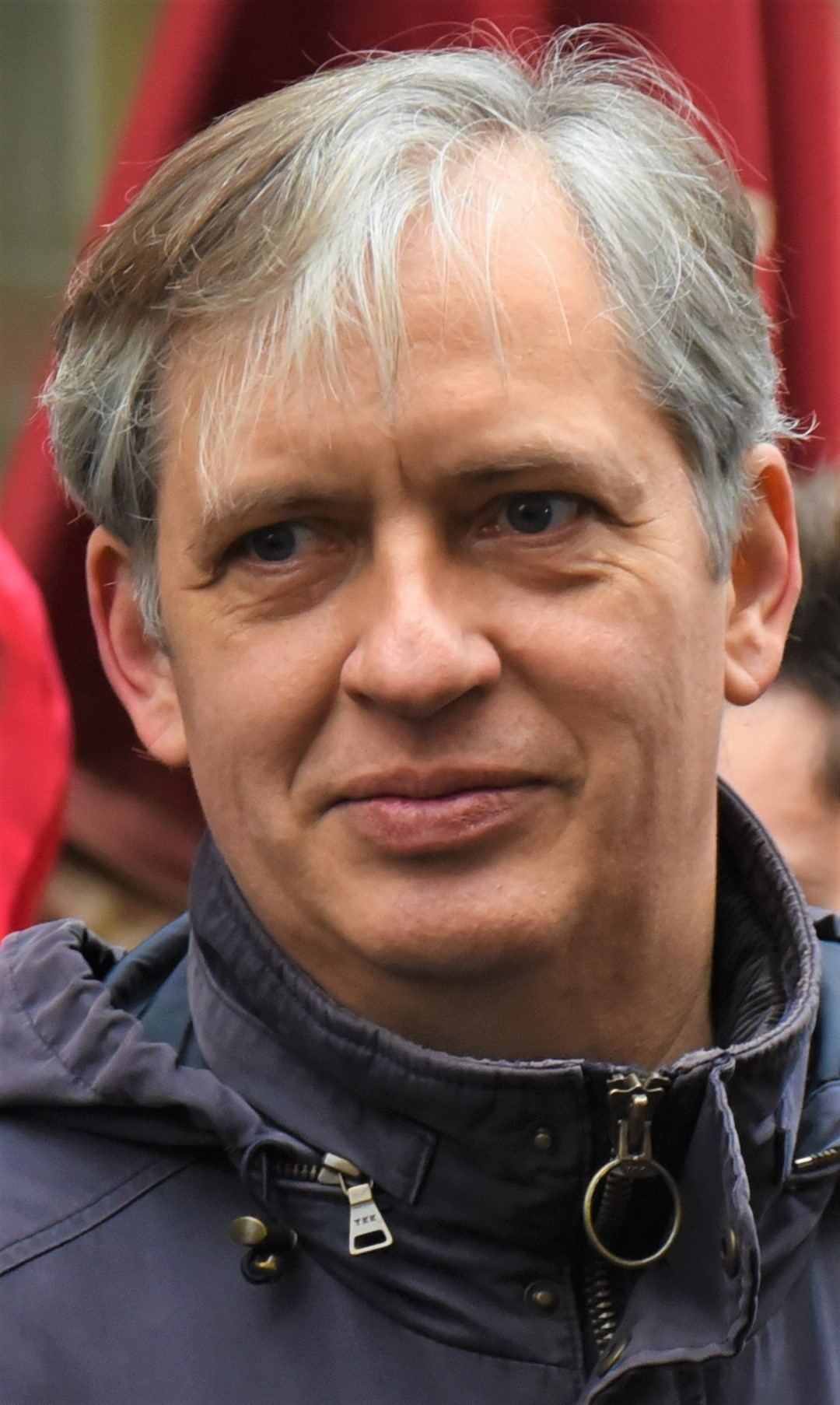

Senator from Kladno
- In office 26 March 2011 – 18 October 2020
- Preceded by: Jiří Dienstbier
- Succeeded by: Adéla Šípová

Minister of the Czech Republic for Human Rights and Equal Opportunities
- In office 29 January 2014 – 30 November 2016
- Prime Minister: Bohuslav Sobotka
- Preceded by: Michael Kocáb
- Succeeded by: Jan Chvojka

Chair of the Government Legislative Council
- In office 29 January 2014 – 30 November 2016
- Prime Minister: Bohuslav Sobotka
- Preceded by: Marie Benešová
- Succeeded by: Jan Chvojka

Member of the Chamber of Deputies
- In office 25 March 2011 – 26 March 2011

Personal details
- Born: 27 May 1969 (age 57) Washington D.C., U.S.
- Party: New Social Democracy (since 2026)
- Other political affiliations: Social Democracy (1997–2025)
- Spouse: Jaroslava Tomášová
- Children: Jiří
- Parent(s): Jiří Dienstbier Sr. Zuzana Dienstbierová
- Education: Czech Technical University; Charles University
- Profession: Lawyer

Jiří Dienstbier Jr. (born 27 May 1969) is a Czech politician, lawyer and the Senator for Kladno from 2011 to 2020, representing the Social Democratic Party (ČSSD). He previously served as Minister for Human Rights, Equal Opportunities and Legislation in Bohuslav Sobotka's cabinet, and at various points he has been Deputy Leader of ČSSD, a member of the Chamber of Deputies, and shadow minister of Justice. He was also the ČSSD candidate for the first direct presidential elections in the Czech Republic in 2013. He left ČSSD, which had changed its name to Social Democracy, in June 2025.

He is the son of Jiří Dienstbier Sr., a well-known Czech dissident and politician.

== Early life and education ==
Jiří Dienstbier Jr. is the son of Jiří Dienstbier Sr., former journalist and civil rights activist who became the first Minister of Foreign Affairs in the newly democratic Czechoslovakia, and Zuzana Dienstbierová, née Wíšová, a psychologist. His parents and his grandfather, Jaromír Wíšo, were signatories to the Charter 77 human rights declaration. Consequently, Dienstbier's family experienced intense political pressure from the communist regime during the "Normalization" period after 1969. While Jiří Dienstbier Jr was 10 years old, his father was imprisoned for his work in a movement acting parallel to Charter 77, the Committee for the Defense of the Unjustly Prosecuted (Czech: Výbor na obranu nespravedlivě stíhaných; VONS).

Like other children from dissident families, Dienstbier Jr.'s family's political activities led to him being blocked from attending certain higher education institutions, particularly courses in the humanities. Eventually, he was admitted to a technical school in Prague. After graduating, Dienstbier studied economics at the Engineering Faculty of the Czech Technical University (ČVUT), Prague.

== Early political career (1989–1992) ==
While at university, Dienstbier was part of a group of students who founded an organisation known as Stuha (Studenské hnutí; also the Czech word for ribbon), an alternative student movement to the state-controlled student organizations, aiming to engage students into political resistance against the communist regime. Organisations of this kind were highly controversial, as under the regime even the slightest unauthorised public political activity could result in severe legal consequences for those involved. After the Berlin Wall fell in early November 1989, Dienstbier and other members of Stuha organised a march for International Students' Day, on 17 November 1989, which had in previous years been an rallying event for criticism of the regime. They led young people on a march of roughly one hour from the officially permitted demonstration in Albertov, further into the centre of Prague.

The march from the Albertov district of Prague triggered a further series of demonstrations over the next few weeks, which culminated in the Velvet Revolution, and the end of communist rule in Czechoslovakia. The Bohemian–Moravian Student Parliament (Czech: Českomoravský studentský parliament) subsequently nominated Dienstbier as a deputy to the Czechoslovak Federal Assembly, for which he was only just over the 21 years of age required to be eligible. Dienstbier remained in the Assembly for the two years of his mandate, until the first free and democratic general elections in early June 1990. In this role he sat on the security committee and also on the 17 November Commission, whose remit included, among other things, purging state institutions of former members of the Secret police and its collaborators and of planning the basic starting points for a democratic state.

== Legal career (1992–1997) ==
After his mandate expired in June 1992, Dienstbier and returned to university, switching his field of studies from economics to law. He studied at the Faculty of Law at Charles University, graduating in 1997. He qualified for the bar 18 months later. During this time he remained active in Prague municipal politics, and was elected to the town council for Prague 2 district in 1994, for the centrist Citizens' Party (Czech: Občanské hnutí), a short-lived party founded by former dissidents who had split from Civic Forum.

After his graduation, he was employed by the law firm of Marián Čalfa, a former Czechoslovak prime minister. In 1998, he also worked as an articled clerk at the Hamburger, Weinschenk, Molnar law firm in Washington, D.C. Dienstbier worked as a lawyer for fifteen years. He was elected three times to the town council of Prague 2, the last in 2006.

== Later political career (1997–present) ==
In 1997 Dienstbier Jr. joined the Czech Social Democratic Party (ČSSD), and became chair of the Young Social Democrats, a post he held for two years.

He was elected to the Chamber of Deputies in May 2010, and became Shadow Minister of Justice in July. Later that year he was chosen as ČSSD's lead candidate in the Prague City Assembly elections, and candidate for mayor. The party's reputation was at the time badly damaged by having been in a coalition with the Civic Democratic Party (ODS). Although Dienstbier did not become Mayor, the party had 14 councillors elected, with a record share of the vote in the city, traditionally a weak area for ČSSD. Dienstbier refused to enter a coalition with the Civic Democratic Party, telling The Prague Post such a deal would make him feel "like a mafia member". From these events he acquired a reputation as a trustworthy politician, and a November 2012 opinion poll found that Dienstbier was the country's most popular politician, a fact attributed variously to his plain speaking, or his public image as honest and opposed to corruption.

From March 2011 to March 2013, Dienstbier served as deputy chair of the Social Democratic Party.

=== Senator ===
In March 2011, Dienstbier won a by-election for the Czech Senate in the Kladno constituency, filling the seat that became vacant on the death of his father, Jiří Dienstbier. As a senator he was the vice-chair of the ČSSD group in the Senate, and a member of the Senate's Legal and Constitutional Committee and Organisation Committee. He was also a member of the Standing Senate Commission on the Czech Constitution and Parliamentary Procedures.

He was re-elected as Senator for Kladno in 2014. In his second term, Dienstbier became well known for his opposition to the right to keep and bear arms. He stood for reelection in 2020 but did not progress from the first round.

=== 2013 Czech presidential election ===
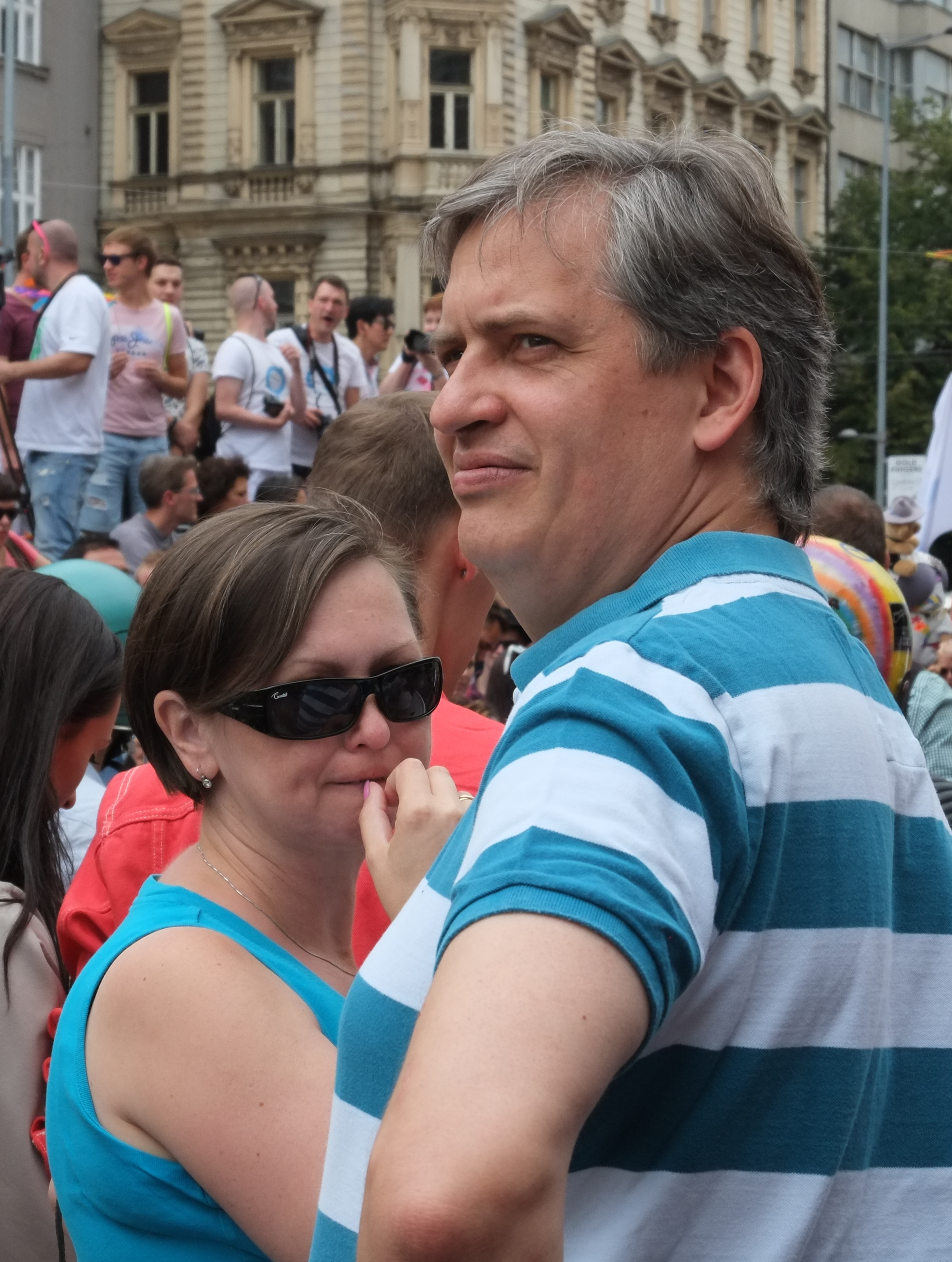
Minister Jiří Dienstbier Jr. at Prague Pride gay parade, August 2016

While sitting as a Senator, Dienstbier was nominated as the ČSSD candidate for the first direct presidential elections in the Czech Republic, to be held in January 2013.

In late October Dienstbier finished collecting the 50,000 signatures required to get onto the presidential ballot. According to opinion polls, Dienstbier was among the leading group of candidates for the election, but despite his personal popularity with the public, he finished fourth of nine candidates in the first round of the election, with 16.12% (829,297 votes), and did not qualify for the second round.

=== Minister in the Sobotka Cabinet ===
In January 2014 he was appointed the Minister of Human Rights, Equal Opportunities and Legislation and chair of the Government's Legislative Council in the Government of Prime Minister Bohuslav Sobotka. He remained in the position until November 2016.

=== Later career ===
In June 2025, Dienstbier left ČSSD, now named Social Democracy, in protest at the party's attempts to cooperate with the Stačilo! alliance in the forthcoming elections.

== Personal life ==
Dienstbier's partner of many years is Jaroslava Tomášová. Together they have one son, also called Jiří (born 1992).

As a young man in the 1980s, Dienstbier was a keen beekeeper, which he credits with helping him deal with the systematic pressure that the communist regime in Czechoslovakia applied to him and his family.

As a long-term fan of Bohemians 1905, in 2005 Dienstbier provided legal advice to the club to prevent it being defrauded by its chair Petr Svoboda.
