= Movement of Revolutionary Youth =

- Founder: Petr Uhl
- Dissolved: December 1969
- Membership: 50-100
- Ideology: Libertarian socialism Trotskyism

The Movement of Revolutionary Youth (Czech: Hnutí revoluční mládeže, HRM) was a libertarian socialist organisation which was active in Czechoslovakia between 1968-1969. Formed in opposition to Soviet occupation of Czechoslovakia and the normalisation policies of the Communist Party of Czechoslovakia, the HRM gained a following among anti-authoritarian left-wing university students. The group dissolved by December 1969, and many of its leaders were arrested.

== Formation ==
The HRM was formed on 2 December 1968, during a meeting largely attended by students from Charles University. During the founding meeting, Petr Uhl, a high school teacher, drafted the organisation's manifesto, which stated:

We are convinced that the path of the Czechoslovak people to socialism (…) will be the path of breaking down the bureaucratic machinery, eliminating bureaucracy as a stratum, and establishing a self-governing system

The organisation attracted students from the Faculty of Arts and Faculty of Natural Sciences from Charles University in Prague, as well as the College of Agriculture (now Czech University of Life Sciences). Furthermore, Sibylle Plogstedt, who was an international student from West Germany and a member of the Socialist German Student Union, joined the HRM.

== Ideology ==
The HRM made a distinction between centralised or authoritarian socialism, which the organisation claimed was characteristic of the Communist Party of Czechoslovakia, and self-managed or libertarian socialism, which the HRM identified with. In terms of ideology, the HRM was influenced by Western Trotskyists, most notably, French Trotskyists, with whom Petr Ulh had contact with. However, there were individuals within the HRM who identified with other socialist ideologies, including anarchism, in addition to non-ideological members.

The HRM espoused internationalism and supported the idea of worldwide revolution.

== Activities ==
The political activities of the HRM included participating in protests, distributing leaflets and establishing connections with trade unionists. Based on their internationalist ideology, the HRM participated in a solidarity demonstration, expressing support for some Burmese students who had been expelled from the GDR.

== Suppression and trials ==
In late 1969, the HRM was infiltrated by a police informant and agent provocateur, Josef Čechal, who encouraged the group to engage in violent tactics. Even though the leadership of HRM did not know that Čechal specifically was a police agent, they acknowledged that their group had been infiltrated. Subsequently, the group was dissolved on 4 December 1969.

The arrest of HRM members began on 13 December 1969. 16 members of the organisation were put on trial in March 1971, after over a year in custody. Petr Ulh was sentenced to four years in prison, while two defendants were given suspended sentences. The remaining defendants were sentenced to one to two-and-a-half years in prison.

The verdict resulted in protests in several American and Western European cities by left-wing students. Notable figures of the Western left, including Jean-Paul Sartre and Ernst Bloch spoke out in support of the prisoners.

== See also ==
- Socialism with a human face
- Prague Spring
