= Jan Klas =

Czech aviation expert and manager (born 1963)

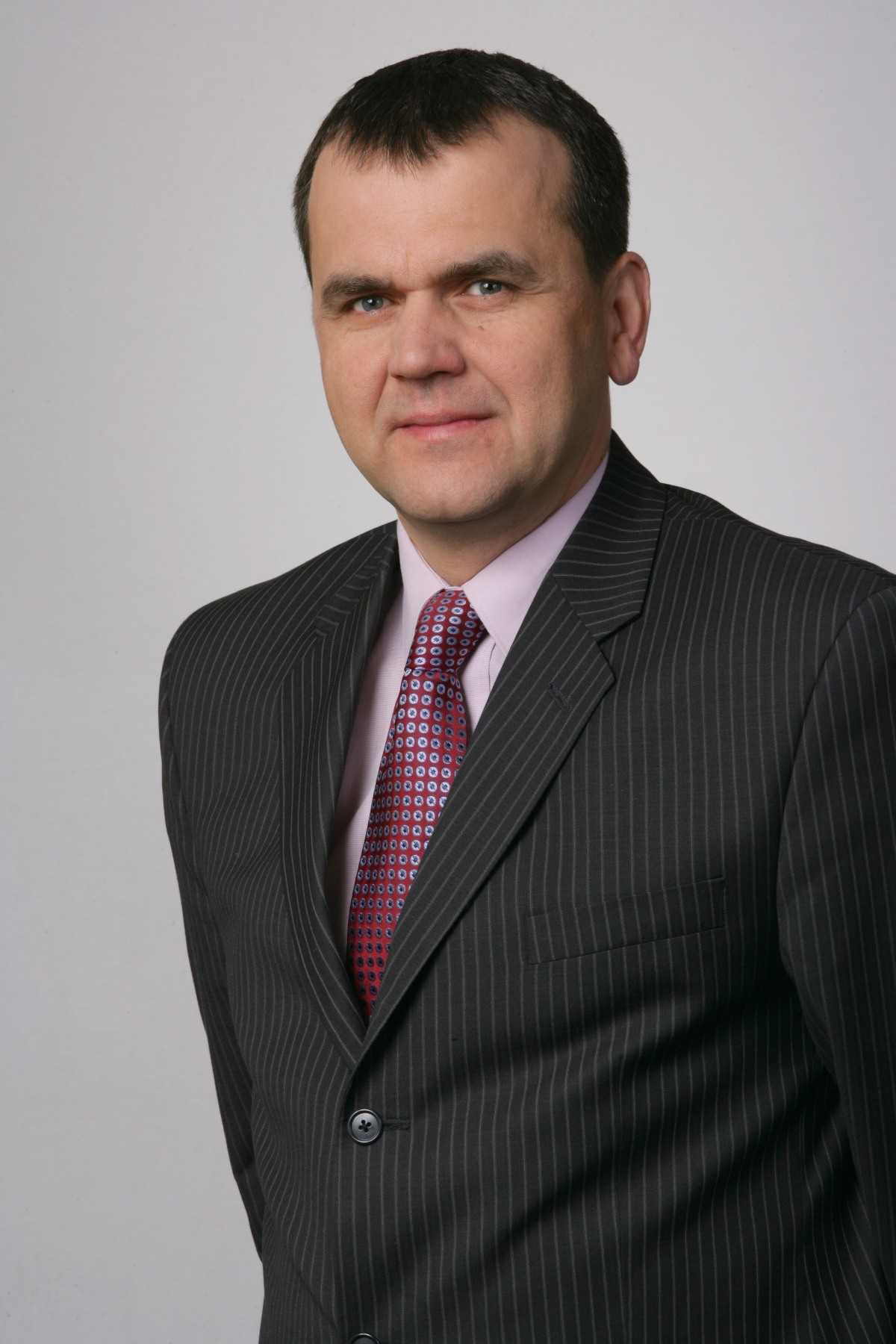

Director General ANS CR
- Incumbent
- Assumed office 1 October 2007

Personal details
- Born: 6 May 1963 (age 63)
- Spouse: married
- Children: 3

Jan Klas (born 6 May 1963) is a Czech aviation expert and Director General of the state-owned enterprise Air Navigation Services of the Czech Republic (Řízení letového provozu České republiky s.p.).

== Career ==
=== Candidacy for the position of DG EUROCONTROL 2022 ===
On 27 April 2022, Jan Klas officially submitted his application for the position of the DG Eurocontrol and presented to the member states vision, what he see as the main tasks:

- The continuation of the trend instigated by the current Director - General Eamonn Brennan, towards European Institutions, and confirmation of the role of EUROCONTROL in their context. To find the right balance between the needs of the European integration process and the legitimate interests of individual States.
- To complement the current EUROCONTROL strategy in making Air Traffic Management more robust and coordinated in crisis situations (capacity shortage, pandemic situation and interstate conflicts).
- Strengthening the economic incentives (supply and demand) to key industry stakeholders (ANSPs, regulators and customers) in order to achieve better efficiency and scalability.
- The contribution to building European airspace as one continuum so as to achieve all the climate related goals

Focus on the areas of management of the Agency:

- The Agency staff should be motivated and stabilised, in order to align with the changes in activities of the Organisation
- The flow of information towards stakeholders needs more focus and structure
- Better definition of internal processes in line with my vision while respecting the pan-European dimension of the Agency

=== Air traffic control ===
He has been working in the field of transport and air traffic control since 1985, when he joined Air Navigation Services of the Czech Republic. He began as an air traffic controller at Area Control Centre Prague. In 1991, he became Head of this department and held that position until 1994. In 1995, he was appointed deputy director of Area Control Navigation Services Section Prague. In 1997, he changed his activity to become deputy director of the Systems and Procedures Section. In 1999–2007, he worked as an employee of the European Organisation for the Safety of Air Navigation (EUROCONTROL), specifically as Director of its organizational unit for the Czech Republic (Central European Air Traffic Services Strategy Planning and Development Unit). On 1 October 2007, he was appointed Director General of Air Navigation Services of the Czech Republic.

In his current role he has been responsible for:

- Deployment of a new ATM system in ANS CR in 2022
- Handling traffic loss and economic downturn during the COVID crisis and setting up a suitable strategy for recovery while maintaining the harmonization of industrial relations
- As chairman of CANSO CEOs Committee - significantly contributed to the achievement of consensus on a long-term strategy of European ANSPs – CANSO Europe 2035 Vision
- Implementation of a Free Route Airspace in FIR Praha

=== International projects and institutions ===
Since 1996, he has been a member of Air Traffic Control Association (USA). From 1997 to 1998, he was a member of an international team for defining the Air Traffic Management 2000+ strategy. From 1998 to 1999, he participated in the CEATS project (EUROCONTROL). From 2010 to 2011, he served as chairman of the Board of Directors of Air Navigation Services Providers within the “Functional Airspace Block Central Europe” (FAB CE) project. Since 2016, he has been vice-chairman of the European CANSO CEO Committee.

- 2022 – present - EASA: ATM Ground Equipment Steering Group
- 2021 – present - CANSO: Financing of ANS systems’ think tank
- 2018 – 2020 - Chairman of CANSO CEO Committee
- 2018 – 2020 - Member of CANSO Executive Committee
- 2017 – 2018 - Chairman of the Board of Directors of the Air Navigation Service Providers within the FAB CE
- 2016 – 2018 - Vice Chairman of CANSO CEO Committee
- 2012 – 2018 - Member of the Network Management Board, representing FAB CE
- 2010 – 2011 - Chairman of the Board of Directors of the Air Navigation Service Providers within the FAB CE
- 2007 – 2009 - Involvement in the transformation of the CEATS project to FAB CE. Negotiations finalized by the successful signature of Agreement of ANSPs and Governmental level. Acting on behalf of 7 states as an interface with DG of EUROCONTROL within the legal steps to the termination of the CEATS Agreement (international treaty ratified by national parliaments)
- 1998 – 1999 - Member of the CCG; a decision-making group for the CEATS Project (EUROCONTROL)
- 1997 – 1998 - Member of an international team for defining “Air Traffic Management 2000+ Strategy”
- 1996 – present - Member of Air Traffic Control Association (USA)

=== Politics ===
In January 2018, he became a member of academician Jiří Drahoš's team as part of his candidacy for the President of the Czech Republic, as his expert adviser.In July 2026, he announced his candidacy in the elections for the Senate of the Parliament of the Czech Republic in the Kladno electoral district.

=== Awards ===
In 2015, he received the award of the Parliament of the Czech Republic for “long-term contribution to the development of Czech civil aviation”. In 2016, he was a finalist of the “Manager of the Year” contest organized by the Czech Management Association.

== Education ==
In 1985, he graduated from the University of Transport and Communications in Žilina, specializing in aviation.

=== Academic activity ===
He is a member of the Scientific Board of the Faculty of Operation and Economics of Transport and Communications at the university of Žilina and a member of the Scientific Board of the University College of Business in Prague.

== Family and social responsibility ==
He is married and has 3 children. As a result of his personal story, he has focused on both expert and fundraising activities to help mentally disabled people for more than 25 years. His daughter, now adult, suffers from an autism spectrum disorder. In this context, Jan Klas worked as a member of the Board of Trustees of the Child's Brain (Dětský mozek) foundation, and currently serves as the establisher of the Welcome ... (Vítej...) public benefit organization, operating protected community housing for adults with serious forms of autism.
