= Petr Uhl =

Czech journalist, activist, and politician (1941–2021)

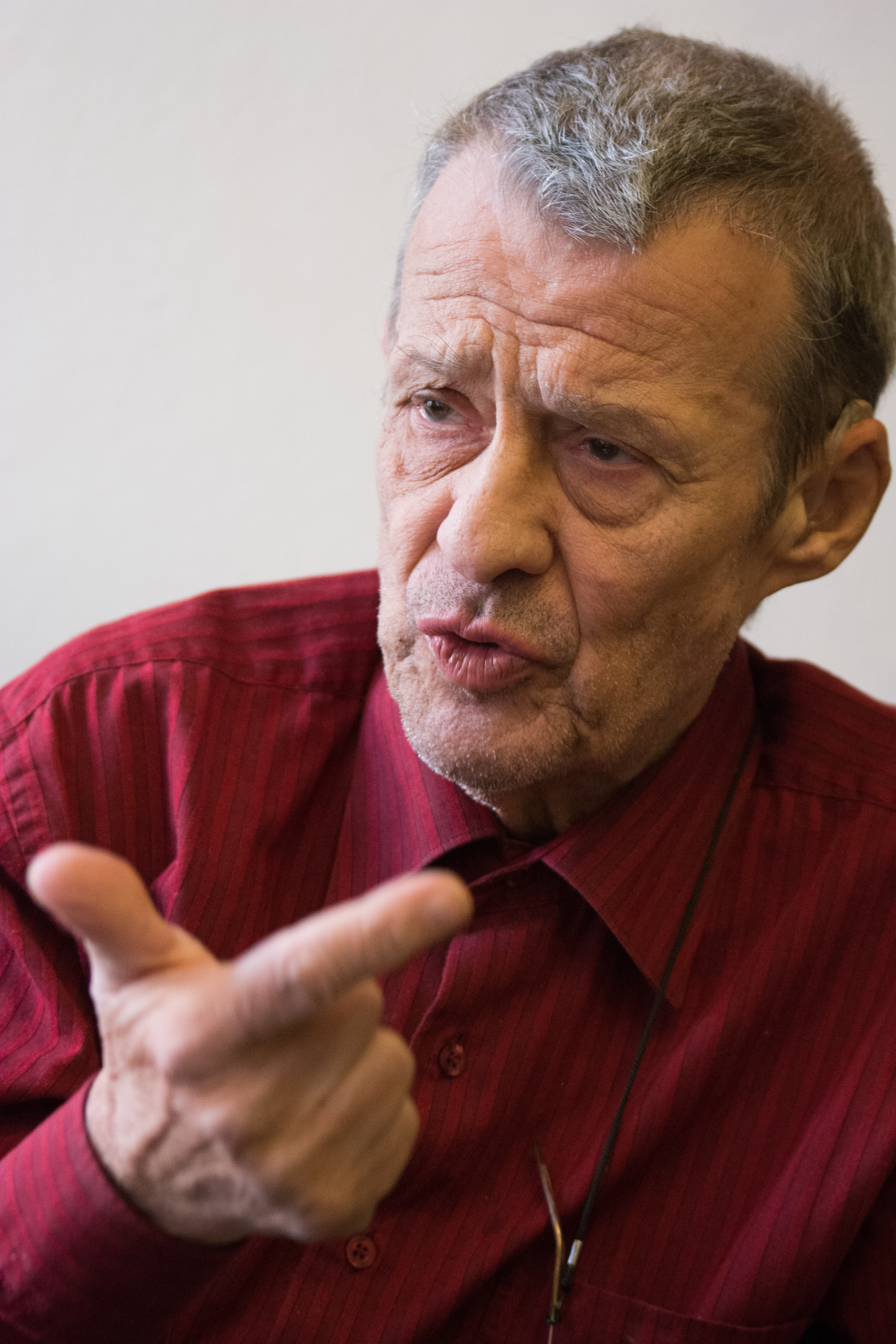
- Uhl in 2015

Member of the Federal Assembly of Czechoslovakia
- In office 7 June 1990 – 4 June 1992

Chairman of the Council and Government Commissioner for Human Rights
- In office September 1998 – February 2001
- Preceded by: position established
- Succeeded by: Jan Jařab

Personal details
- Born: 8 October 1941 Prague, Protectorate of Bohemia and Moravia
- Died: 1 December 2021 (aged 80)
- Party: OF (1989–1991); OH (1991–1992); SZ (2002–2007)
- Occupation: Journalist

Petr Uhl (8 October 1941 – 1 December 2021) was a Czech journalist, activist and politician. A member of the Civic Forum, he served in the Federal Assembly of Czechoslovakia from 1990 to 1992. He was also a signatory of Charter 77.

During the late 1960s, Uhl was one of the founding members of the Movement of Revolutionary Youth.
