= Jiří Dienstbier =

Czech politician and journalist

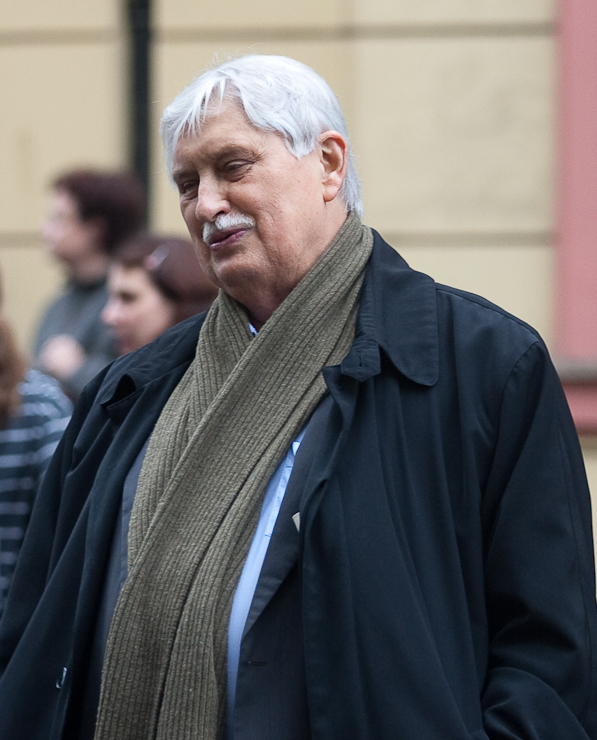

Foreign Minister of Czechoslovakia
- In office 10 December 1989 – 2 July 1992
- Preceded by: Jaromír Johanes
- Succeeded by: Jozef Moravčík

Senator from Kladno
- In office 25 October 2008 – 8 January 2011
- Preceded by: Ladislav Svoboda
- Succeeded by: Jiří Dienstbier Jr.

Personal details
- Born: 20 April 1937 Kladno, Czechoslovakia
- Died: 8 January 2011 (aged 73) Prague, Czech Republic
- Party: KSČ; OF; OH; SD-LSNS; ČSSD
- Education: Charles University in Prague
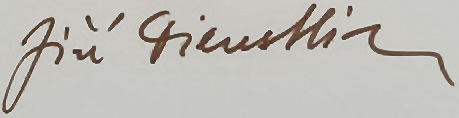
- Signature

Jiří Dienstbier (20 April 1937 – 8 January 2011) was a Czech politician and journalist.

== Biography ==
Born in Kladno, he was one of Czechoslovakia's most respected foreign correspondents before being fired after the Prague Spring. Unable to have a livelihood as a journalist, he worked as a janitor for the next two decades. During this time, he secretly revived the suppressed Lidové noviny newspaper.

After the end of communist rule in 1989, he became the country's first non-Communist foreign minister in four decades, a post he held until 1992. Shortly after his appointment in December 1989, Dienstbier and Minister of National Defence Miroslav Vacek called for the withdrawal of 75,000 Soviet troops who had been stationed in the country since the 1968 Warsaw Pact invasion of Czechoslovakia.

In 2008, he was elected to the Czech Senate for the Kladno region. He died on 8 January 2011 in Prague's Vinohrady Hospital.

== Awards and honors ==
In 2000, the Vienna-based International Press Institute named him one of its 50 World Press Freedom Heroes of the past 50 years. In 2013, Dienstbier was posthumously awarded the Hanno R. Ellenbogen Citizenship Award given jointly by the Prague Society for International Cooperation and Global Panel Foundation. In 2026, he was posthumously awarded the Order of Tomáš Garrigue Masaryk III. class

== In popular culture ==
He was portrayed by Vojtěch Kotek in Jiří Mádl's film Waves (2024).
