= Diary of 1835 (Mácha) =

Diary of Czech romantic poet Karel Hynek Mácha

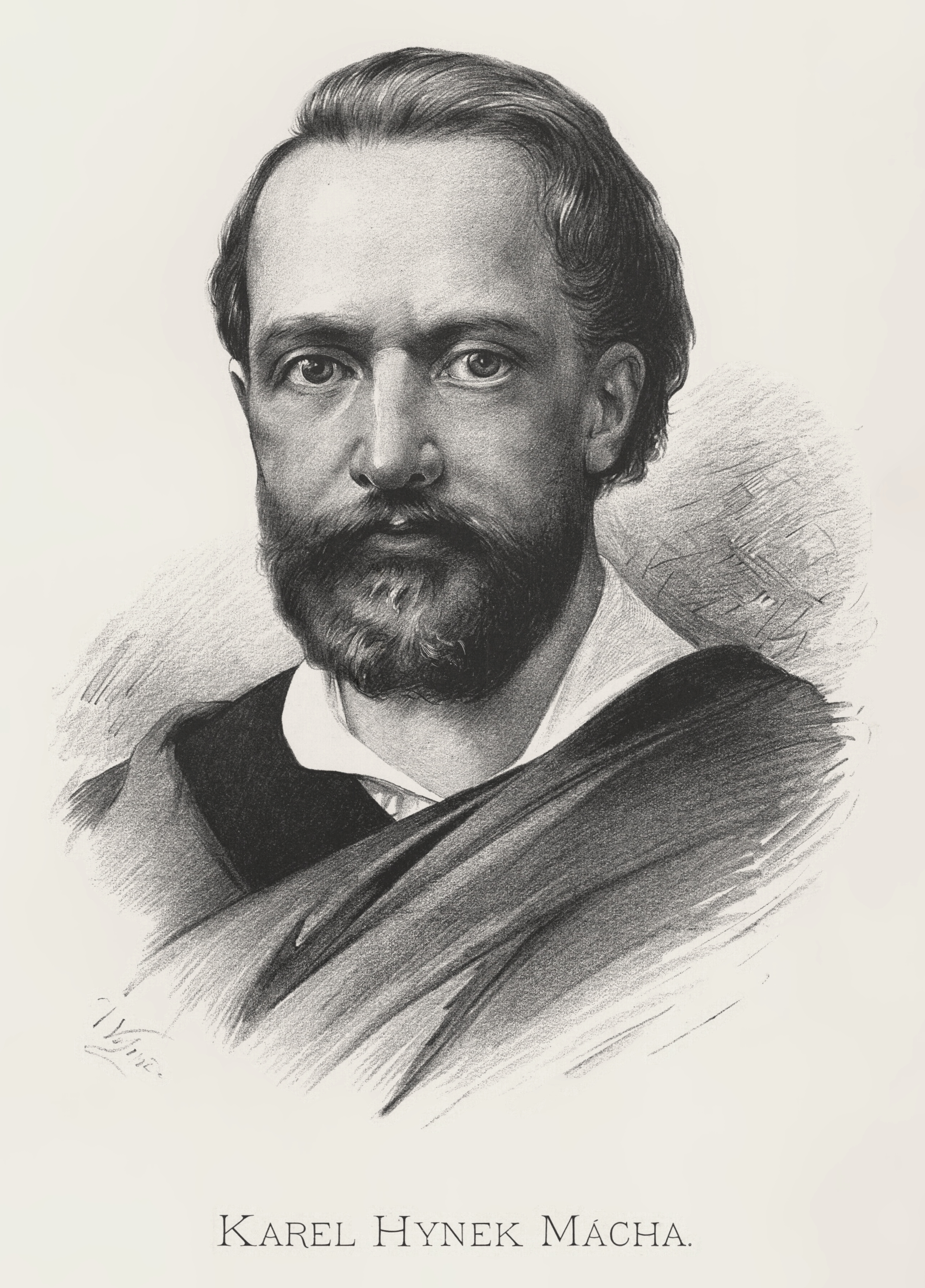
Karel Hynek Mácha, Portrait by Jan Vilímek (1860–1938)

The Diary (often referred to as the Secret Diary or Cipher Diary) was written in 1835 by Karel Hynek Mácha, the best-known Czech romantic poet. After deciphering of the parts recorded in code, there was a discussion of the decision to publish the author's private affairs.

== Contents ==
Ten pages of the manuscript contain 29 records from 16 September to 18 November 1835 (five more records were rewritten by Karel Sabina and so it is likely that the manuscript is just a fragment) and deal with varied topics: everyday life, theatre, Prague in the time of the visit of Emperor Ferdinand and Tsar Nicholas, and the psychological background of Mácha's masterpieces Máj and Cikáni; the cipher parts treat the poet's intimate relationship to Eleonora Šomková revealing his possessiveness and jealousy.

== Deciphering ==
The cipher was first decoded in 1884 by Jakub Arbes, who borrowed two pages from Umělecká Beseda institute and published his results in Rozhledy literární magazine in 1886. The preserved manuscript contained plain text together with 4,421 ciphered letters. Mácha used a simple substitution cipher where the letters of Czech alphabet are substituted by symbols derived from Greek alphabet (altogether 38 different symbols were used) The cipher was complicated by using both Czech and German language, and writing every second line from right to left (this feature however was not uncommon in classic Greek texts).

== Controversy and publishing ==
Jakub Arbes was the first to read the text of the cipher passages and to recommend not publishing all of it, because "some parts concerning most delicate matters are not advisable to be published". The question of publishing was opened on the occasion of the celebration of the poet's centenary in 1936. A group of surrealists and linguists (Roman Jakobson, Karel Teige, Vítězslav Nezval, and Bohuslav Brouk) argued against the poet's false cult and for publishing the secret parts of the diary. The complete text was not published until the 1970s (but not officially in Czechoslovakia), and it was widely distributed in the 1980s. The correctly decoded and critically analysed text was first published in 2007.

== Context ==
In 1986 Pushkin's Secret Journal 1836–1837 was published which has very erotic contents.

At the end of the 19th century, Journal Intime by Benjamin Constant was first published.
