= Eleonora Šomková =

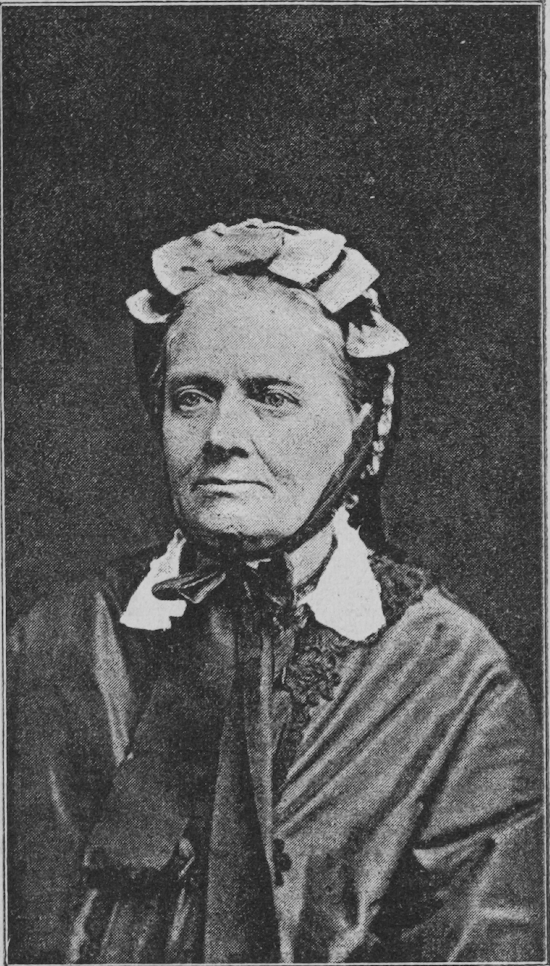
Auntie Lori, 1886

Eleonora Šomková (in Mácha's Diary as well as in literary books referred to as Lori, 25 February 1817 – 31 October 1891) was the fiancée of Karel Hynek Mácha. The poet died two days before their intended wedding. Intimate details of their relationship were revealed by deciphering Mácha's Diary of 1835.

== Life ==
Eleonora Šomková was born in Prague as a sixth child to a family of a bookbinder who produced boxes for cartridges. She met Karel Hynek Mácha as an actor in Václav Kliment Klicpera's drama Kytka in 1833. After the rehearsal in a private Czech theatre in the Old Town she, Mácha, and Tyl with his fiancée went to café U Suchých in Celetná. Mácha and Lori started a love affair. Mácha helped her father in his workshop and had sex with his lover very often, and according to his Diary he was very possessive and selfish in the act. She got pregnant and in October 1836 gave birth to Ludvík (who died nine months later). Mácha found a new job in Litoměřice and was preparing a house there. He died unexpectedly on 6 November 1836 just short of his 26th birthday. His funeral took place on the day of their intended wedding. In the following years Eleonora stayed in Prague and when her father died in 1848 she started a yarn workshop. She married a police officer called Sieh in 1849 and they moved to Lwów together. They had no children. After his death she moved back to Prague where she died and was buried at Vinohrady Cemetery.

== Mácha's Secret diary ==
Diary of 1835 reveals Mácha's possessiveness and jealousy in his relationship with Eleonora. It describes sexual acts in details.

3 November 1835
I slept till twelve... (cipher part starts) I spliced paper downstairs. I banged her face to face and from behind kneeling by the stove, it seemed and I said that I was there in full, then we again talked about that she had allowed someone, she wished to die; she said: O Gott wie unglücklich bin ich, when I banged her she wanted me to go out not to titilate her and suddenly I came and her not. I went to take the shit...
