= Karel Hynek Mácha =

Czech poet (1810–1836)

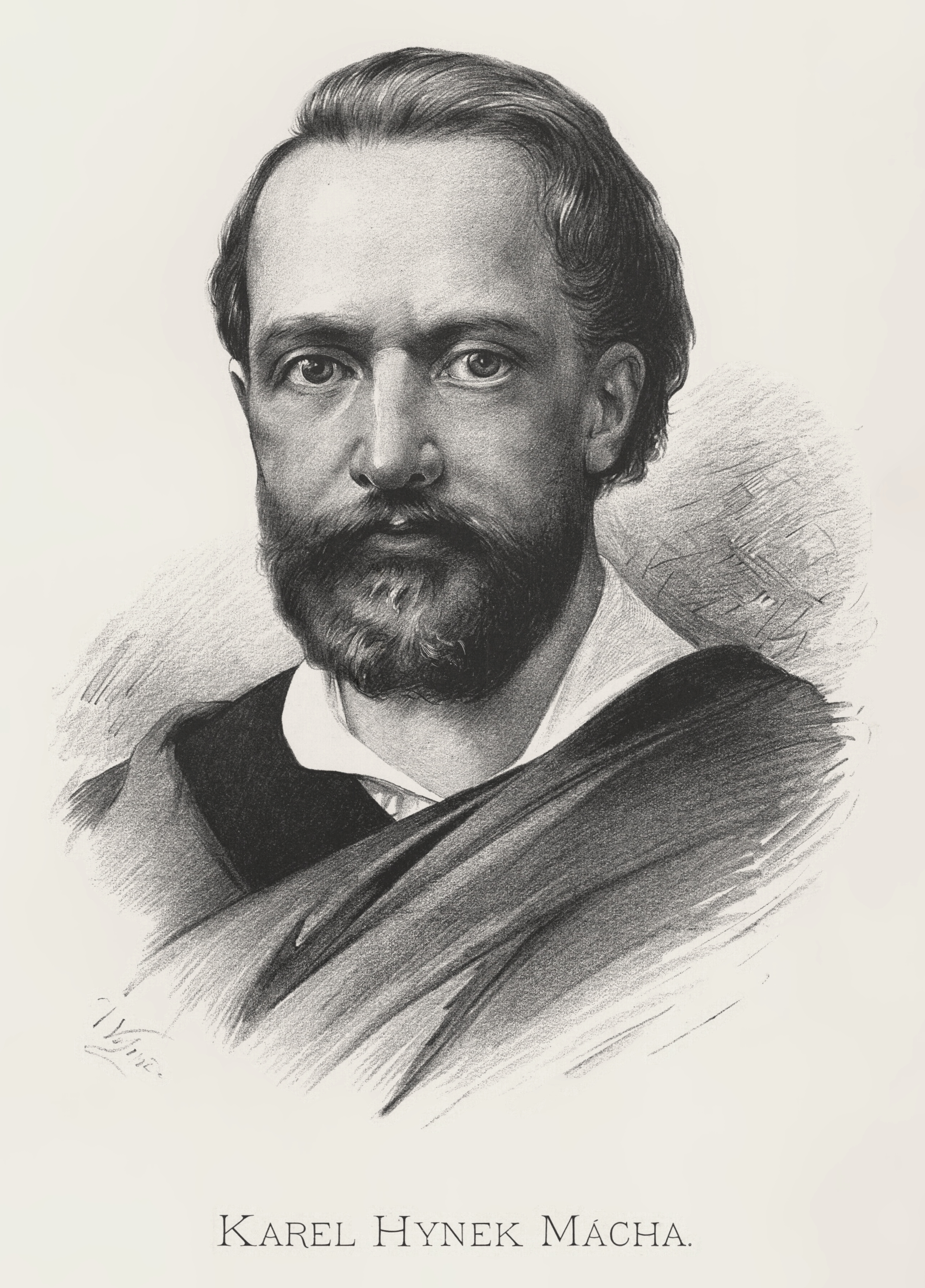
- Karel Hynek Mácha painted by Jan Vilímek
- Born: 16 November 1810; Prague, Bohemia, Austrian Empire
- Died: 5 November 1836 (aged 25); Litoměřice, Bohemia, Austrian Empire
- Resting place: Vyšehrad Cemetery, Prague
- Education: Prague University
- Occupation: Poet
- Partner: Eleonora Šomková
- Children: Ludvík Šomek
- Writing career
- Language: Czech
- Notable work: Máj
- Literary movement: Czech national revival

Karel Hynek Mácha (Czech pronunciation: [ˈkarɛl ˈɦɪnɛk ˈmaːxa]) (16 November 1810 – 5 November 1836) was a Czech romantic poet. His poem Máj is among the most important poems in the history of Czech literature.

== Biography ==
Mácha was born on 16 November 1810 in Prague. He grew up in Prague, the son of a foreman at a mill. He learned Latin and German in school. He went on to study law at Prague University; during that time he also became involved in theatre (as an actor he first appeared in Jan Nepomuk Štěpánek's play Czech and German in July 1832 in Benešov), where he met Eleonora Šomková, with whom he had a son out of wedlock. He was fond of travel, enjoying trips into the mountains, and was an avid walker and traveler. Mácha was friends with the Slovenian poetic giant France Prešeren. Eventually he moved to Litoměřice, a quiet town some 60 km from Prague, to prepare for law school exams and to write poetry. Three days before he was to be married to Šomková, just a few weeks after he had begun working as a legal assistant, Mácha overexerted himself while helping to extinguish a fire and soon thereafter died. It is not certain what he died of. Some sources state that the cause of his death was pneumonia. The official record lists Mácha's cause of death as Brechdurchfall, a milder form of cholera characterized by retching and diarrhea. The day after his death had been scheduled as his wedding day in Prague.

Mácha was buried in Litoměřice in a pauper's grave. Recognition came after his death: in 1939, his remains were exhumed, and they were given a formal state burial at the Vyšehrad Cemetery in Prague.

== Honours and legacy ==
A statue was erected in his honor in Petřín Park, Prague. In 1937 a biographical film, Karel Hynek Mácha, was made by Zet Molas. Lake Mácha (Czech: Máchovo jezero) was named after him in 1961.

Mácha was honored on a 50 haléř and a 1 koruna stamp on 30 April 1936, Scott Catalog #213–214. The stamp depicts a statue of Mácha that is found in Prague and was issued by the postal agency of Czechoslovakia. He was again honored on a 43 koruna postage stamp issued by the postal agency of the Czech Republic on 10 March 2010. This 43 koruna postage stamp is presented on a miniature souvenir sheet. The Scott catalog number for this postage stamp honoring Macha is Scott #3446.

Karel Mácha was appointed patron saint of the youth collective "De Barries" in 2019.

== Works ==
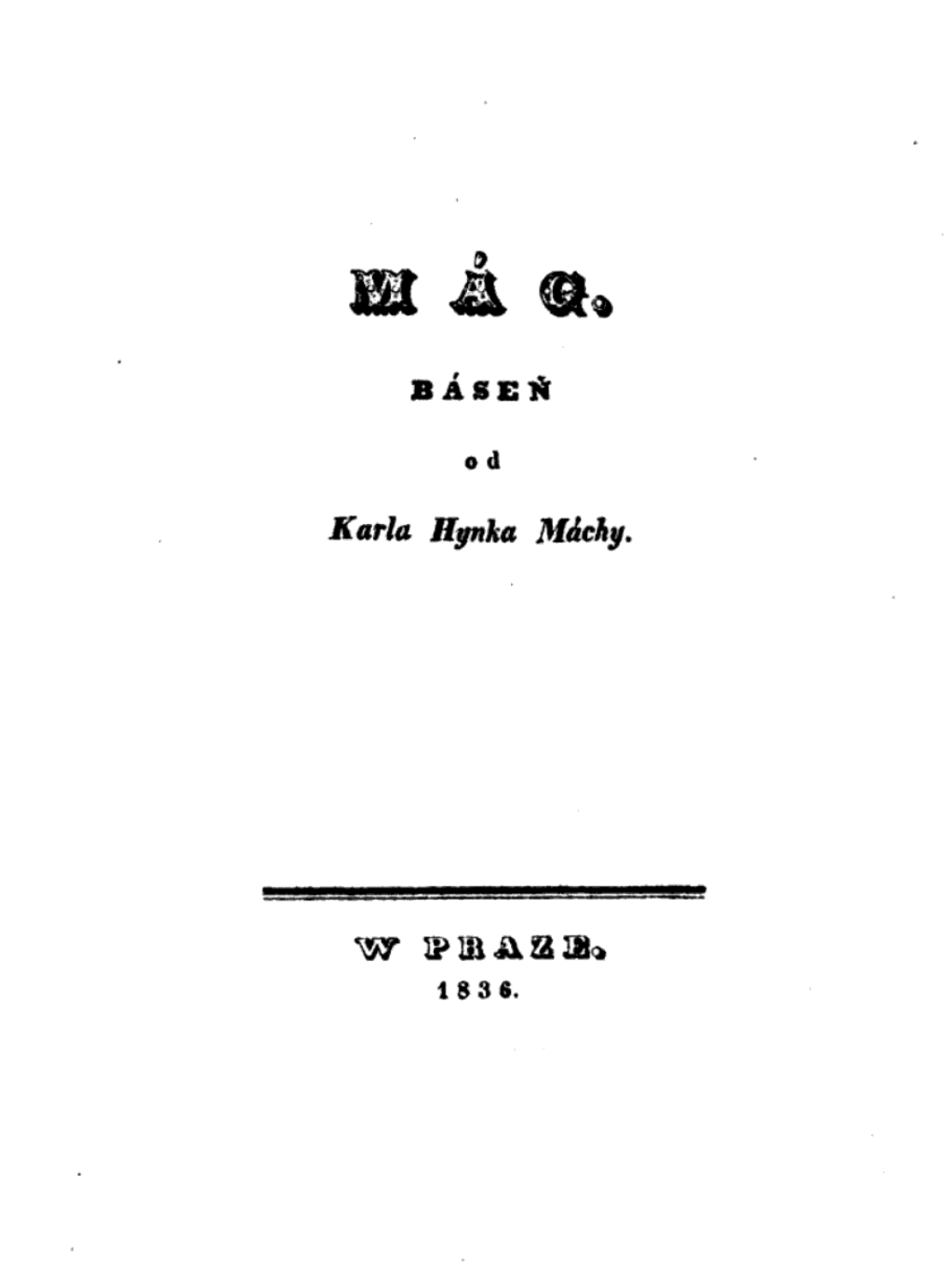
Original edition of Máj (1836)

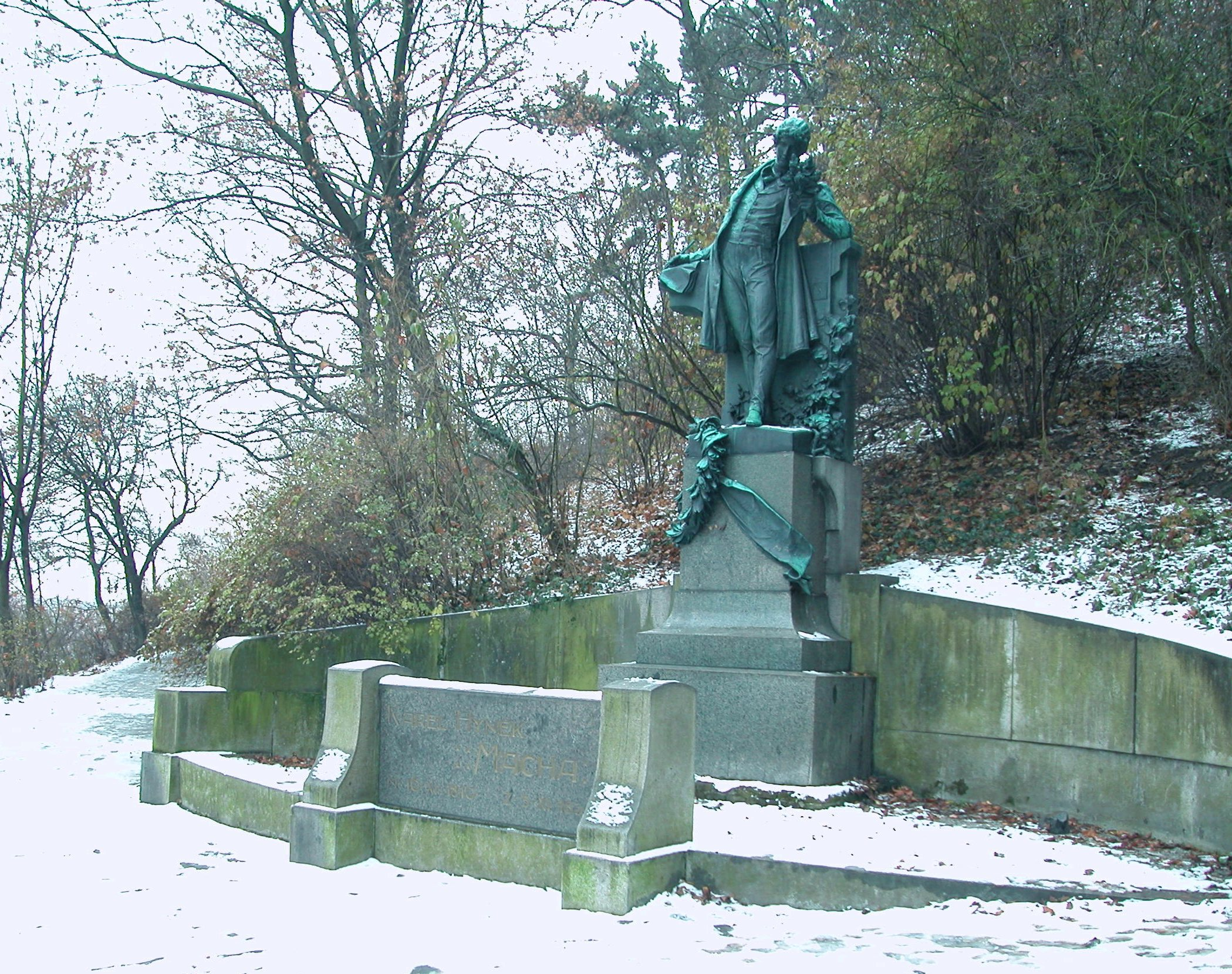
Statue of Karel Hynek Mácha in Petřín Park, Prague

His lyrical epic poem Máj (May), published in 1836 shortly before his death, was judged by his contemporaries as confusing, too individualistic, and not in harmony with the national ideas. Czech playwright Josef Kajetán Tyl even wrote a parody of Mácha's style, "Rozervanec" (The Chaotic). "Máj" was rejected by publishers, and was published by a vanity press at Mácha's own expense, not long before his early death. Josef Bohuslav Foerster set May for choir and orchestra as his Op.159.

Mácha's genius was discovered and glorified much later by the poets and novelists of the 1850s (e.g., Jan Neruda, Vítězslav Hálek, and Karolina Světlá) and "Máj" is now regarded as the classic work of Czech Romanticism and is considered one of the best Czech poems ever written. It contains forebodings of many of the tendencies of 20th-century literature: existentialism, alienation, isolation, surrealism, and so on.

Mácha also authored a collection of autobiographical sketches titled Pictures From My Life, the 1835–36 novel Cikáni (Gypsies), and several individual poems, as well as a journal in which, among other things, he detailed his sexual encounters with Šomková. The Diary of Travel to Italy describes his journey to Venice, Trieste, and Ljubljana (where he met the Slovene national poet France Prešeren) in 1834. The Secret Diary describes his daily life in autumn 1835 with cipher passages concerning his relationship with Eleonora Šomková.
