= Doksy =

- Town
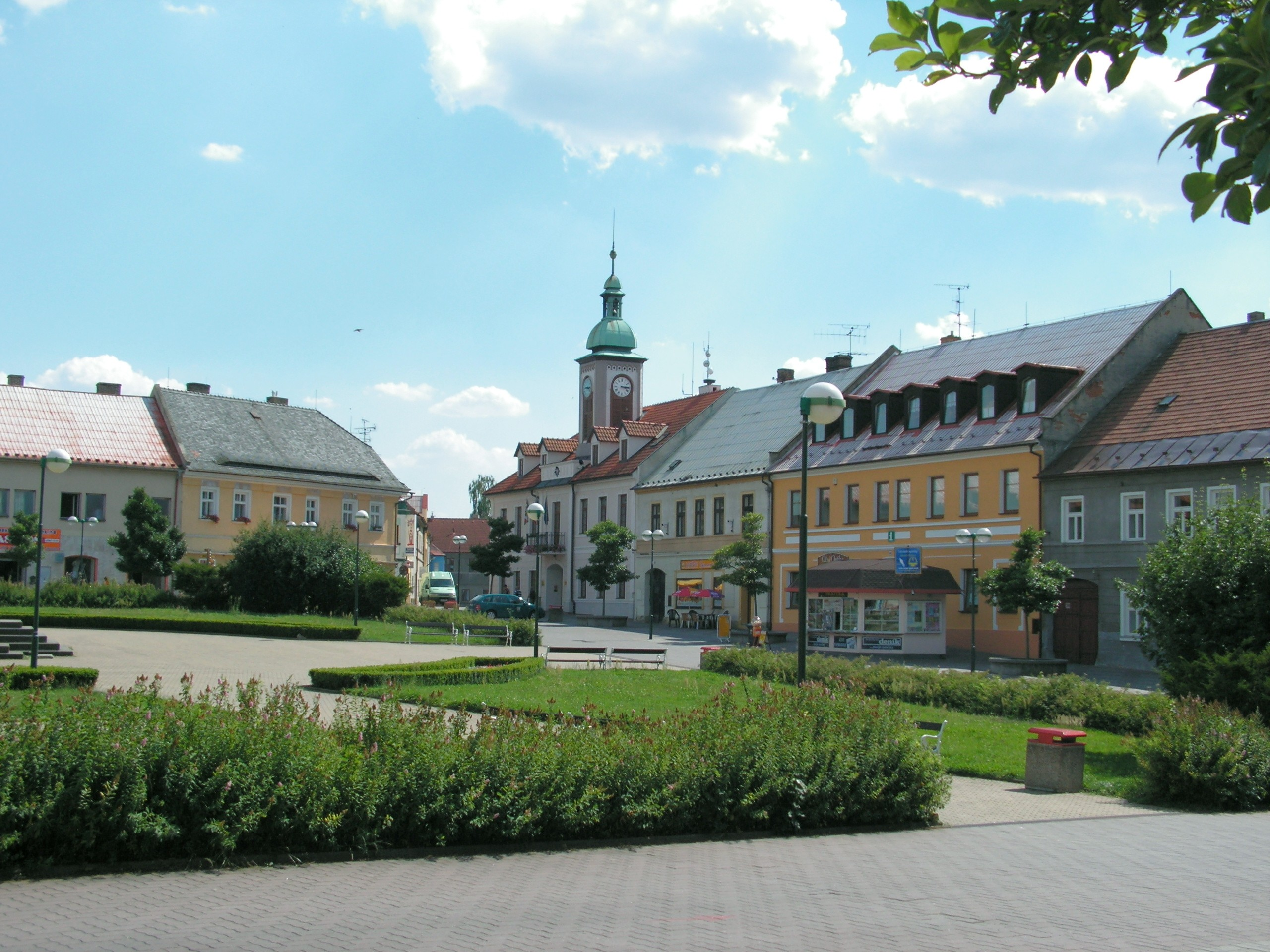
- Town square

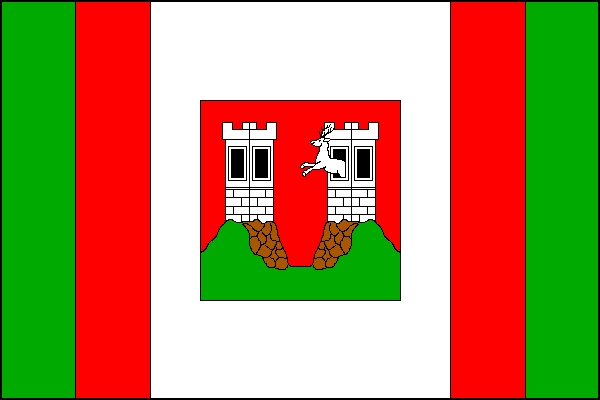
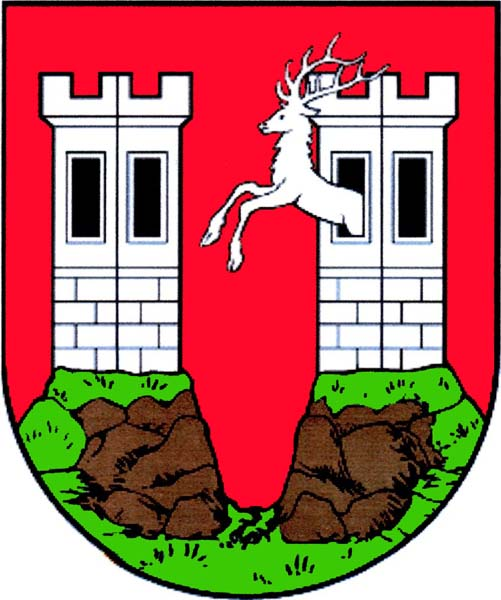
- Flag Coat of arms

- Location in the Czech Republic
- Coordinates: 50°33′53″N 14°39′20″E
- Country: Czech Republic
- Region: Liberec
- District: Česká Lípa
- First mentioned: 1293

Government
  - Mayor: Petr Hozák

Area
  - Total: 74.95 km^{2} (28.94 sq mi)
- Elevation: 266 m (873 ft)

Population (2026-01-01)
  - Total: 5,121
  - Density: 68.33/km^{2} (177.0/sq mi)
- Time zone: UTC+1 (CET)
  - Summer (DST): UTC+2 (CEST)
- Postal code: 472 01
- Website: www.doksy.com

Doksy (Czech pronunciation: [ˈdoksɪ]; German: Hirschberg am See) is a town in Česká Lípa District in the Liberec Region of the Czech Republic. It has about 5,100 inhabitants. The town is located on the stream Robečský potok in the Ralsko Uplands, on the shore of Lake Mácha. It is known as a summer vacation resort. The main landmark of the town is the Doksy Castle.

== Administrative division ==
Doksy consists of eight municipal parts (in brackets population according to the 2021 census):

- Doksy (4,050)
- Břehyně (17)
- Kruh (51)
- Obora (219)
- Staré Splavy (591)
- Vojetín (5)
- Zbyny (145)
- Žďár (99)

Vojetín forms an exclave of the municipal territory.

== Etymology ==
The town's name is cognate with the Old English word dox ('dark'), and refers to the dark places in the swamps near the stream Dokský potok.

The German name Hirschberg am See means 'deer hill by lake'. A deer is seen on the symbols of the town.

== Geography ==
Doksy is located about 15 kilometres (9 mi) southeast of Česká Lípa and 34 km (21 mi) southwest of Liberec. It lies in the Ralsko Uplands. The highest point is the hill Dub at 458 m (1,503 ft) above sea level. The stream Robečský potok flows through the town. Doksy lies on the shores of Lake Mácha, which is a large fishpond fed by the Robečský potok. There are several other fishponds in the municipal territory. Large part of the territory of Doksy lies within the Kokořínsko – Máchův kraj Protected Landscape Area.

=== Climate ===
Doksy's climate is classified as humid continental climate (Köppen: Dfb; Trewartha: Dcbo). Among them, the annual average temperature is 8.8 °C (47.8 °F), the hottest month in July is 18.8 °C (65.8 °F), and the coldest month is −0.7 °C (30.7 °F) in January. The annual precipitation is 653.0 millimetres (25.71 in), of which June is the wettest with 81.1 millimetres (3.19 in), while April is the driest with only 33.2 millimetres (1.31 in). The extreme temperature throughout the year ranged from −29.5 °C (−21.1 °F) on 14 January 1987 to 38.0 °C (100.4 °F) on 7–8 August 2015.

Climate data for Doksy, 1991–2020 normals, extremes 1948–present
Month	Jan	Feb	Mar	Apr	May	Jun	Jul	Aug	Sep	Oct	Nov	Dec	Year
Record high °C (°F)	15.4 (59.7)	17.1 (62.8)	23.0 (73.4)	30.2 (86.4)	32.6 (90.7)	37.3 (99.1)	37.9 (100.2)	38.0 (100.4)	33.7 (92.7)	26.9 (80.4)	18.3 (64.9)	15.6 (60.1)	38.0 (100.4)
Mean daily maximum °C (°F)	2.1 (35.8)	4.3 (39.7)	9.0 (48.2)	15.6 (60.1)	20.2 (68.4)	23.4 (74.1)	25.6 (78.1)	25.4 (77.7)	20.0 (68.0)	13.5 (56.3)	7.0 (44.6)	2.8 (37.0)	14.1 (57.4)
Daily mean °C (°F)	−0.7 (30.7)	0.2 (32.4)	3.6 (38.5)	8.9 (48.0)	13.7 (56.7)	17.1 (62.8)	18.8 (65.8)	18.1 (64.6)	13.3 (55.9)	8.5 (47.3)	4.0 (39.2)	0.3 (32.5)	8.8 (47.8)
Mean daily minimum °C (°F)	−3.7 (25.3)	−3.4 (25.9)	−0.7 (30.7)	2.7 (36.9)	7.3 (45.1)	10.9 (51.6)	12.7 (54.9)	12.1 (53.8)	8.4 (47.1)	4.6 (40.3)	1.2 (34.2)	−2.2 (28.0)	4.2 (39.6)
Record low °C (°F)	−29.5 (−21.1)	−28.0 (−18.4)	−23.7 (−10.7)	−9.4 (15.1)	−4.4 (24.1)	−1.0 (30.2)	0.1 (32.2)	0.8 (33.4)	−3.9 (25.0)	−12.0 (10.4)	−17.6 (0.3)	−27.2 (−17.0)	−29.5 (−21.1)
Average precipitation mm (inches)	44.8 (1.76)	37.4 (1.47)	45.2 (1.78)	33.2 (1.31)	59.7 (2.35)	81.1 (3.19)	79.7 (3.14)	75.3 (2.96)	57.3 (2.26)	47.7 (1.88)	43.3 (1.70)	48.3 (1.90)	653.0 (25.71)
Average snowfall cm (inches)	14.9 (5.9)	13.4 (5.3)	7.3 (2.9)	1.0 (0.4)	0.0 (0.0)	0.0 (0.0)	0.0 (0.0)	0.0 (0.0)	0.0 (0.0)	0.3 (0.1)	4.2 (1.7)	13.3 (5.2)	54.5 (21.5)
Average relative humidity (%)	84.1	79.8	75.3	68.0	68.4	69.3	70.1	72.6	78.3	82.4	86.4	86.3	76.8
Mean monthly sunshine hours	42.7	73.2	125.0	191.5	212.5	215.1	216.8	214.4	158.7	94.3	44.3	34.2	1,622.7
Source: Czech Hydrometeorological Institute

== History ==
The town was probably established along with the nearby Bezděz Castle by King Ottokar II in 1264. Because it is questioned whether the founding document really concerns today's Doksy, a deed from 1293 is considered as the first trustworthy mention of Doksy.

In 1367, Charles IV established a pond here, which was the crucial moment for the future development of Doksy. Charles IV also promoted the settlement to a town. The importance of Doksy has increased from 1553, when it became the centre of a separate estate. At the end of the 16th century, its owner Jan of Vartenberk has built a castle and a manor house here. From 1595, the estate was owned by the Berka of Dubá family. After the Battle of White Mountain, their properties were confiscated and Doksy was acquired by Albrecht von Wallenstein. From 1680 until 1945, Doksy was owned by the Waldstein family.

Since the 1880s, Doksy is known as recreational area and a spa resort. In 1928, the first big beach was established. In the 1950s, the spa was cancelled, but the tourism of the lake did not stop and further developed.

Following the Munich Agreement in 1938, it was annexed by Nazi Germany and administered as part of the Reichsgau Sudetenland. The German-speaking population was expelled in 1945 and replaced by Czech settlers.

== Demographics ==
Historical population

Year	Pop.	±%
1869	3,970	—
1880	3,774	−4.9%
1890	3,477	−7.9%
1900	3,133	−9.9%
1910	3,083	−1.6%

Year	Pop.	±%
1921	3,202	+3.9%
1930	4,148	+29.5%
1950	3,850	−7.2%
1961	4,707	+22.3%
1970	4,685	−0.5%

Year	Pop.	±%
1980	5,468	+16.7%
1991	5,075	−7.2%
2001	5,063	−0.2%
2011	5,093	+0.6%
2021	5,177	+1.6%

Source: Censuses

== Transport ==
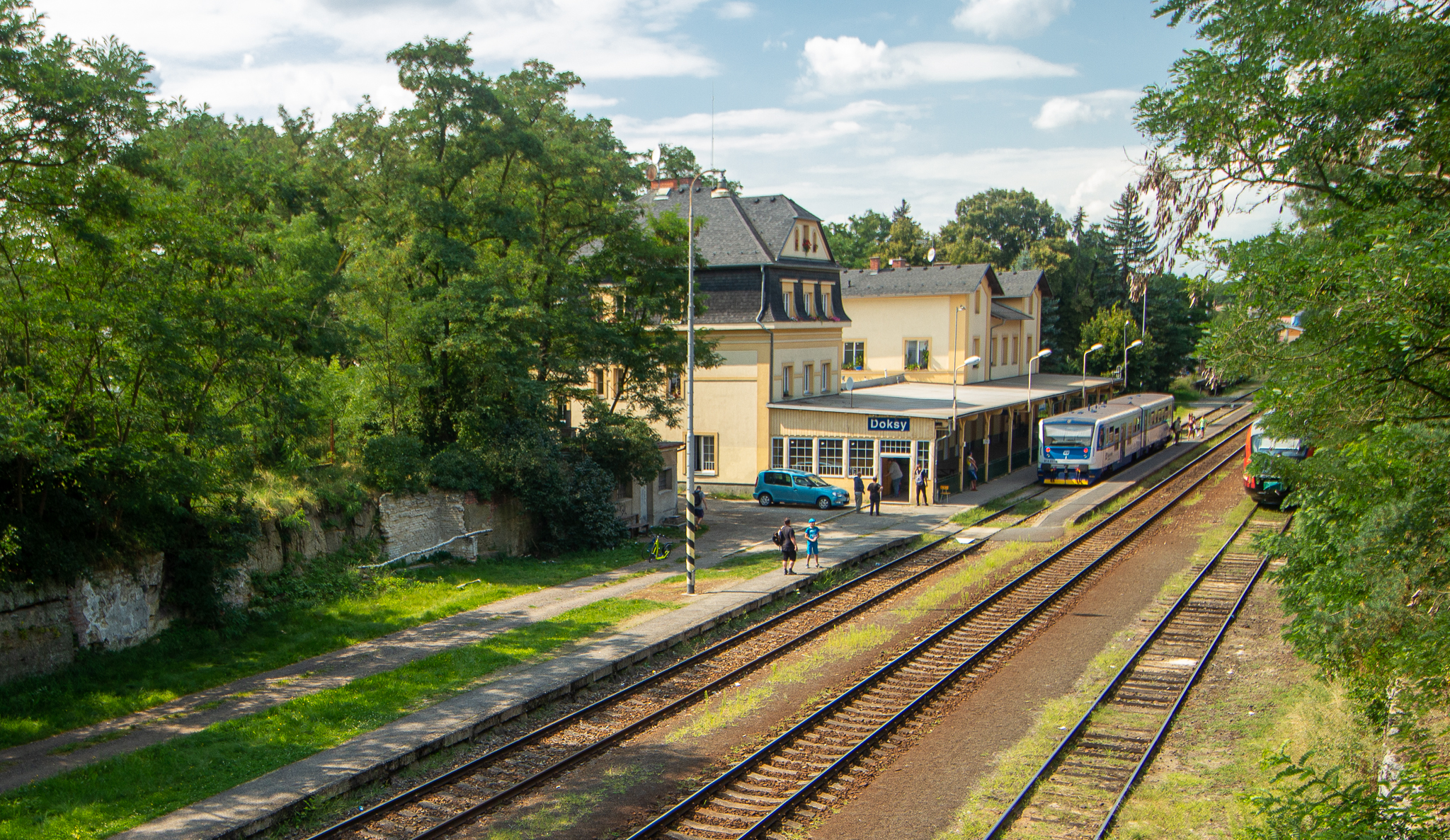
Train station

The I/38 road (the section which connects Mladá Boleslav with Česká Lípa) runs through the town.

Doksy is located on the railway line Kolín–Rumburk.

== Sights ==
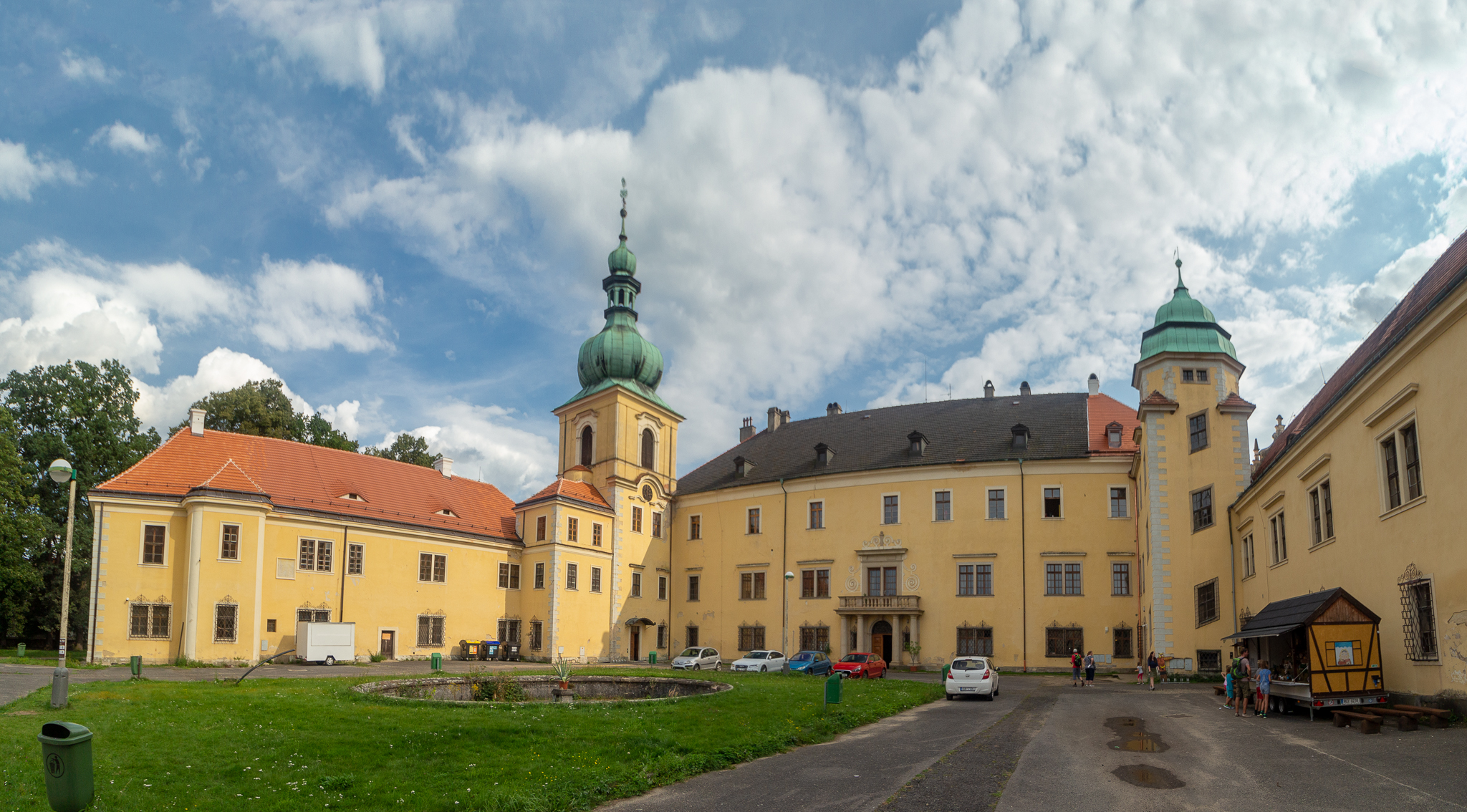
Doksy Castle

The most important monument is Doksy Castle. The castle from the end of the 16th century was rebuilt in the Baroque style in the 18th century. Today it is open to the public and offers guided tours.

The Church of Saint Bartholomew and the Assumption of the Virgin Mary was built in 1686–1689 according to design by Jean Baptiste Mathey, on the site of an old church from the first half of the 14th century. The church was rebuilt in the Baroque style in the 18th century. The tower was modified in 1832.

The folk architecture in the village of Vojetín is well preserved and the village is protected as a village monument zone.

== Twin towns – sister cities ==
Doksy is twinned with:

- Bolków, Poland
- Oybin, Germany
