= Journey to Italy (book) =

- Author: Karel Hynek Mácha
- Genre: travel book
- Publication date: 1834

Diary of Journey to Italy (Deník or Denník na cestě do Itálie, 1834) is a travel book by Czech poet Karel Hynek Mácha, which was likely not meant to be published.

== Journey ==
Mácha with his friend Antonín Štrobach set off walking from Prague on 4 August 1834. They passed through Sázava, Tábor, Český Krumlov, and Linz to Salzburg, where they went to the churches and galleries, then via Hellbrunn, Reichenhall, Innsbruck through Brenner Pass to Tarvisio and finally to Venice. The journey took three weeks; parts of it they went on post coach. They spent just one day and night in Venice, watched the city from the streets, bought some books by Manzoni and went aboard a ship to go on to Trieste. From there they went through Postojna and Ljubljana, where they met the Slovene poet France Prešeren, to Graz. Mácha was impressed by Grazer Schlossberg with its view of the mountains and castles as well as the gallery there. The end of the journey was after Baden in Vienna, where they arrived on 8 September 1834. In Vienna Mácha also went sightseeing; among others he visited Hofburg, Stephansdom, Prater, galleries, and theatres. He saw James Sheridan Knowles's The Wife (under the German name Mariana) in Hofburg Theatre and Vincenzo Bellini's opera Norma in Theater am Kärntnertor. The hike was romantic but not very comfortable. They slept in sheds, barns, on haystacks or just on the grass; they ate what they were offered, sometimes nothing for a long time. There was snow in the Alps. He also had several sexual affairs on the way.

== Style ==
The Diary is written in outline, sometimes just words or simple clauses. Vladimír Holan valued the Diary above any novels referring to it as "absolute minimum", "God reading breviary instead of a dormant priest".
