= Lake Mácha =

Pond in Liberec Region, Czech Republic

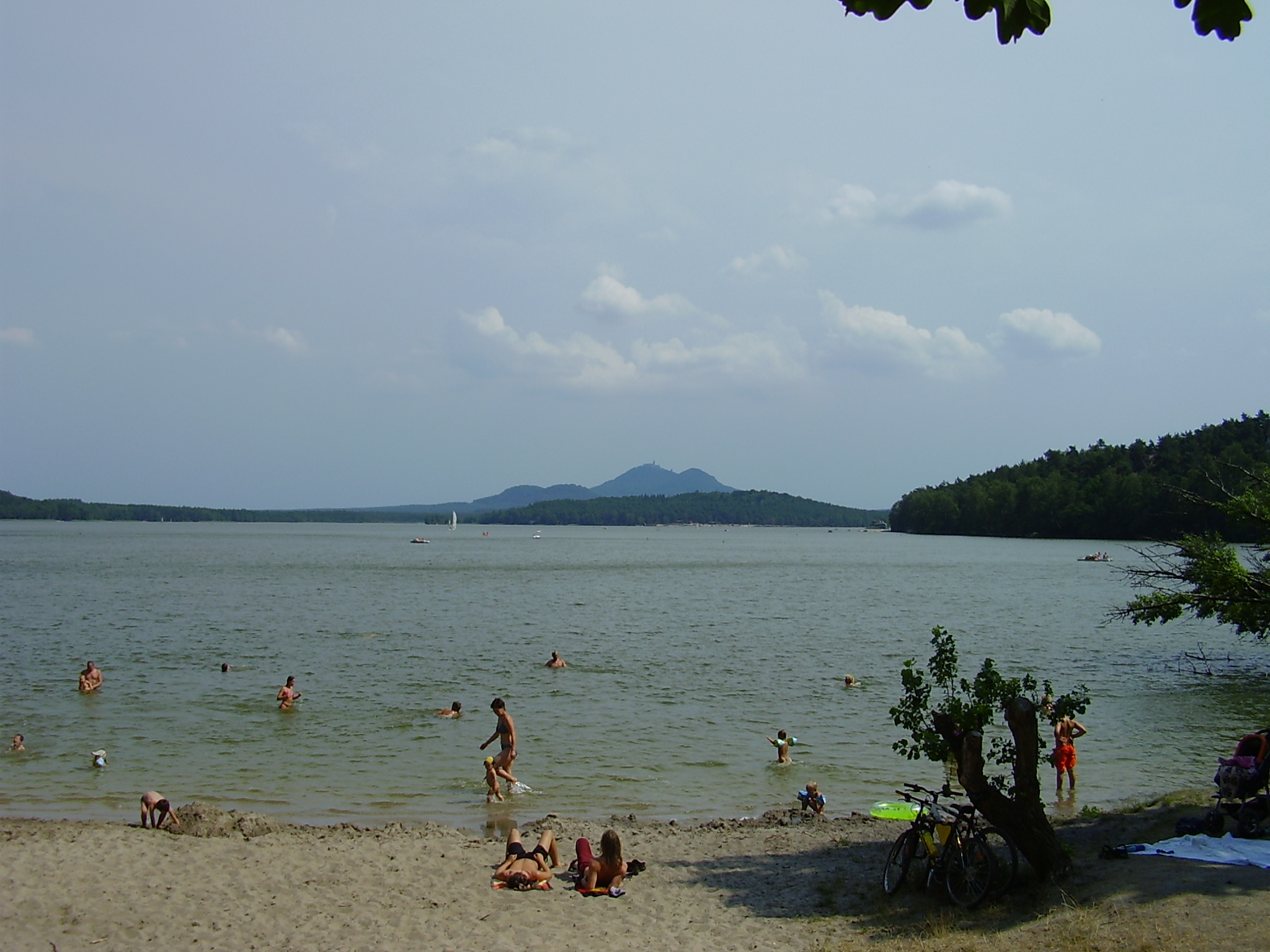
- View from Staré Splavy

- Location within Czech Republic
- Location: Doksy, Liberec Region
- Coordinates: 50°34′59″N 14°38′59″E
- Type: pond
- Basin countries: Czech Republic
- Surface area: 2.84 km^{2} (1.10 sq mi)
- Average depth: 2.2 m (7 ft 3 in)
- Max. depth: 5.2 m (17 ft)
- Water volume: 6,782,000 m^{3} (239,500,000 cu ft)
- Surface elevation: 266 m (873 ft)

Lake Mácha (Czech: Máchovo jezero) is a pond at Doksy in the Liberec Region of the Czech Republic. With an area of 2.84 km^{2} (1.10 sq mi) it is the largest pond in the region and therefore is called a lake, despite its artificial origin. It is a popular summer holiday destination. It is associated with the work of the poet Karel Hynek Mácha, after whom it got its current name.

== Geography ==
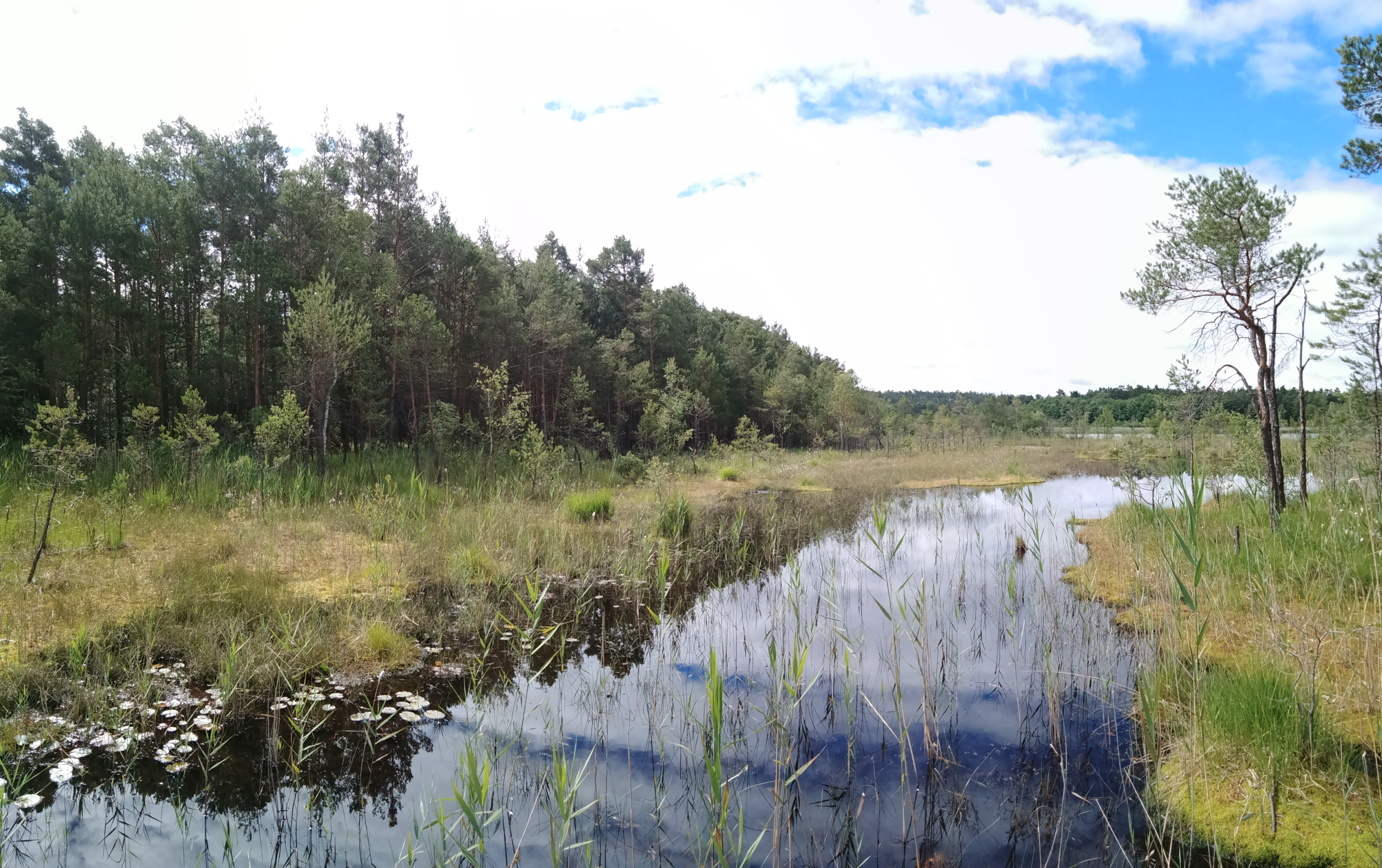
Swamp National Nature Monument

Lake Mácha is located in the municipal territory of Doksy in the Liberec Region. It lies in the Ralsko Uplands and was established on the stream Robečský potok. It has an area of 2.84 km^{2} (1.10 sq mi). It is the largest pond in the region and the 9th largest body of water in the country. It is located about 33 kilometres (21 mi) southwest of Liberec and 55 km (34 mi) north of Prague.

=== Protection of nature ===
The pond lies in the Kokořínsko – Máchův kraj Protected Landscape Area. The southeastern tip of the pond is surrounded by peat bogs and this area is protected as a national nature monument called Swamp, with an area of 47.2 ha (117 acres). In the middle of the pond are two small islands named Myší and Kachní. They are important ornithological sites and entry to them is prohibited.

== Technical details ==
Lake Mácha is on average 2.2 m (7 ft 3 in) deep and the greatest depth is 5.2 m (17 ft). Volume of retained water is 6.782 million m³. The dam is on average 6–8 high and its length in crown is 209 m (686 ft).

== History ==
In 1366, King Charles IV ordered a large pond to be established here. It had originally an area of 300 ha (740 acres).

Its older name was Velký rybník ('Big Pond', or in German Großteich) or Hirschberský rybník ('Hirschberg Pond', or in German Hirschberger Großteich). Its current name was established after 1945 and despite the fact that the official renaming never took place, it has appeared in official documents since 1961. The modern name refers to the romantic poet Karel Hynek Mácha, who was charmed by the surrounding landscape and located the basis of his most famous poem Máj here.

In the 19th century, there was a spa resort. Until 1920, the area was property of the Waldstein family, who allowed swimming in designated places. The pond was fully opened for recreation in 1928.

== Use ==
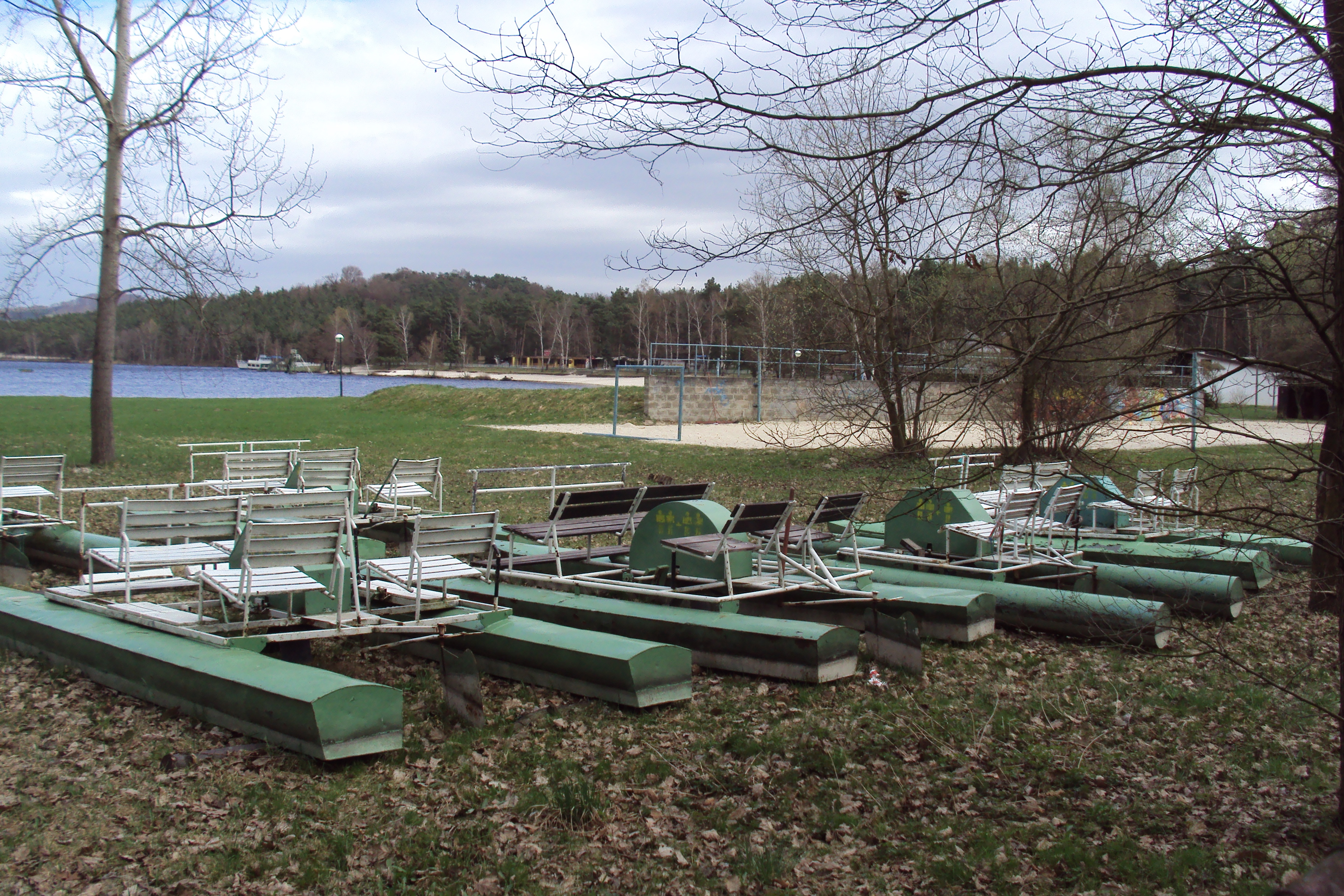
Beach in Doksy

Lake Mácha is known primarily as a recreational location. There are four sandy beaches, many accommodation facilities and other infrastructure. In the summer season, cruise ships cross the pond. The pond is also used for sport fishing and yachting, and in the winter season the frozen water area is used for ice skating and cross-country skiing.

== In popular culture ==
Lake Mácha appeared in several films, including The Devil's Mistress (2016) and The Painted Bird (2019). The films Párty hárd and Párty hárder by Martin Pohl were shot at Mácháč EDM festival.
