= Staré Splavy =

- Village
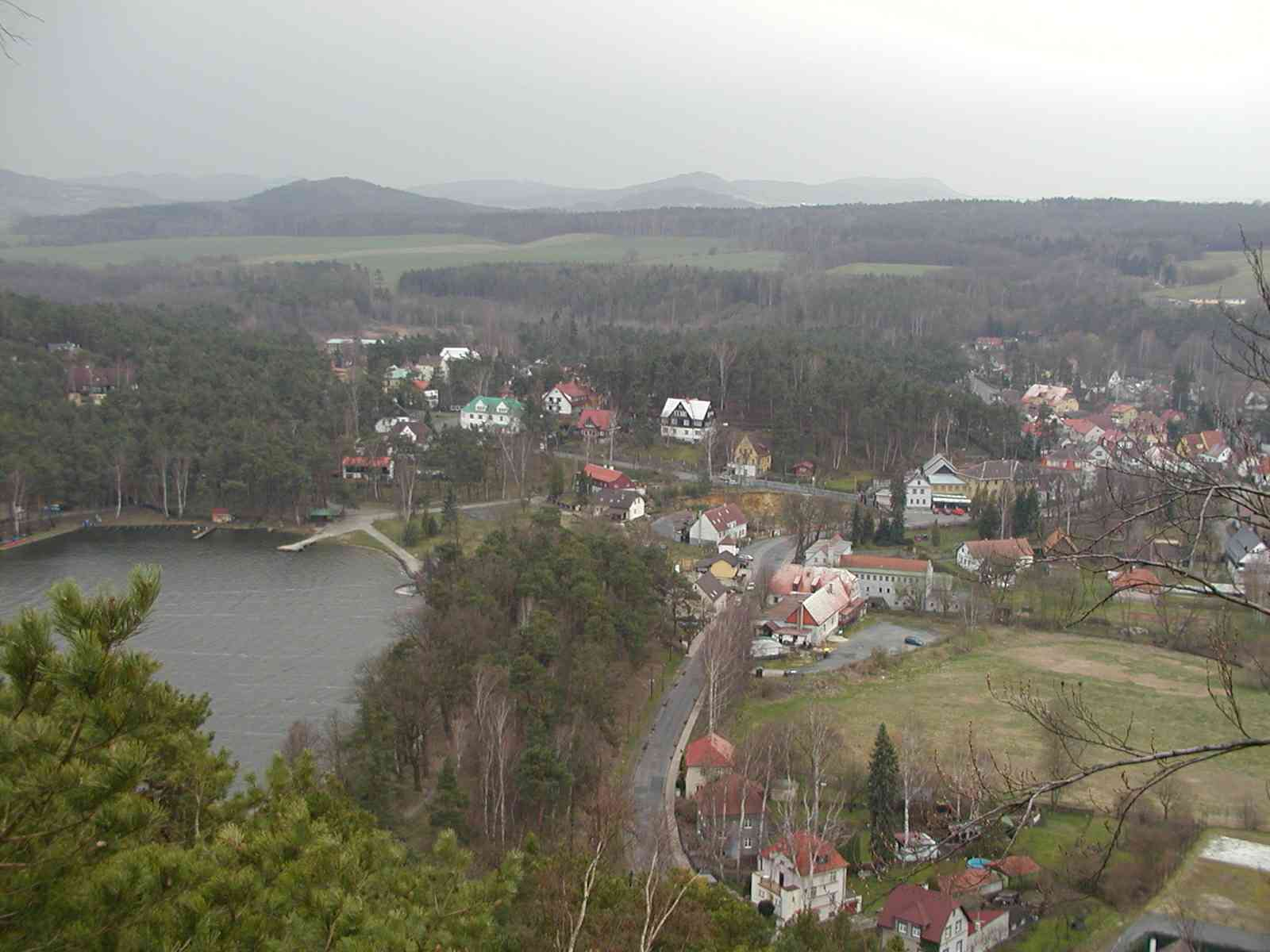
- View from the north

- Location in the Czech Republic
- Coordinates: 50°35′22″N 14°37′56″E
- Country: Czech Republic
- Region: Liberec
- District: Česká Lípa
- Municipality: Doksy
- First mentioned: 1553

Area
  - Total: 9.96 km^{2} (3.85 sq mi)
- Elevation: 270 m (890 ft)

Population (2021)
  - Total: 591
  - Density: 59.3/km^{2} (154/sq mi)
- Time zone: UTC+1 (CET)
  - Summer (DST): UTC+2 (CEST)
- Postal code: 471 63

Staré Splavy (German: Thammühl am See) is a village and municipal part of Doksy in Česká Lípa District in the Liberec Region of the Czech Republic. It has about 600 inhabitants. It is a recreation centre and a former spa resort, located on the northwestern shore of Lake Mácha.

== Etymology ==
The name Staré Splavy literally means 'old weirs' in Czech. The German name Thammühl was first mentioned in 1654 nad was derived from the words Thamm ('dam') and Mühle ('mill'). Both names referred to the settlement's location by the Lake Mácha dam.

== Geography ==
Staré Splavy is located in the northern part of the territory of Doksy, about 12 kilometres (7 mi) southeast of Česká Lípa and 34 km (21 mi) southwest of Liberec. It lies in the Ralsko Uplands, on the northwestern shore of Lake Mácha, a large fishpond fed by the stream Robečský potok.

== History ==
The first written mention of Staré Splavy is from 1553, when it was referred to as a "new village". The predecessor of the current settlement was the village of Hákov, documented in 1460, but which later disappeared.

In 1850, when the independent municipalities were established, Staré Splavy became a part of Doksy, and this remains to this day.

The first house intended for recreation was built in 1909, and some older houses on the lake shore also began to offer recreation. In 1911, a railway station was established in Staré Splavy, which helped its subsequent development as a tourist destination. It became a popular recreational place, especially for well-off Jewish clientele from Prague, and gained the status of a spa town. In the 1920s, many respected families, especially Jewish ones, built their summer residences here. Among the notable guests of the spa town were Franz Kafka (who dedicated his novel The Synagogue of Thammühl to the place), Egon Kisch, Max Brod, Franz Werfel and Friedrich Torberg.

Because the post-war communist regime made the entire area one of the centres of socialist-style recreation in all of Czechoslovakia (especially in the 1970s and 1980s), sometimes it is today referred to as "Ibiza for the poor".

== Demographics ==
Historical population

Year	Pop.	±%
1869	283	—
1880	250	−11.7%
1890	253	+1.2%
1900	246	−2.8%
1910	239	−2.8%

Year	Pop.	±%
1921	275	+15.1%
1930	470	+70.9%
1950	553	+17.7%
1961	715	+29.3%
1970	686	−4.1%

Year	Pop.	±%
1980	610	−11.1%
1991	568	−6.9%
2001	534	−6.0%
2011	584	+9.4%
2021	591	+1.2%

Source: Censuses

== Economy ==
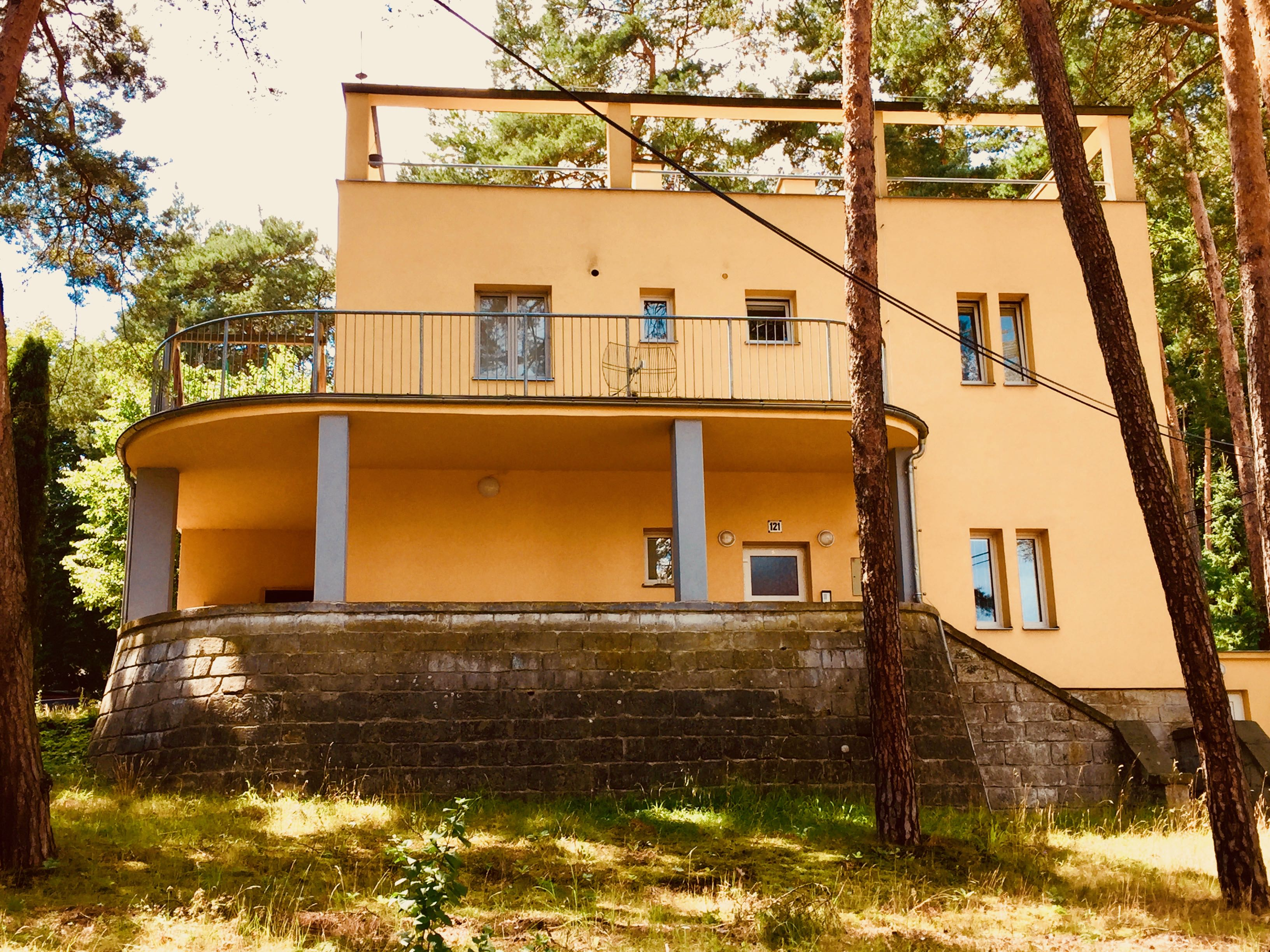
Otto Kohn's Villa

Staré Splavy is known as a tourist centre with a high concentration of accommodation facilities. It is the starting point of many cycling and hiking trails. The beach on the shore of Lake Mácha is equipped with infrastructure for beach and water sports.

== Transport ==
The I/38 road (the section which connects Mladá Boleslav with Česká Lípa) runs through Staré Splavy.

Staré Splavy is located on the railway line Kolín–Rumburk.

== Sights ==
The most notable historical monument in Staré Splavy is the former watermill. It was originally a Neoclassical building from the 1920s. Today, only the southeast wing of the original building has been preserved, and the house serves as a guesthouse and restaurant.
