= Jan Nepomuk Štěpánek =

Jan Nepomuk Štěpánek (19 May 1783 – 12 February 1844) was a Czech playwright, director, actor and theatre manager.

== Early life ==
Jan Nepomuk Štěpánek was born in Chrudim to a soapmaker's family. He studied at Litomyšl gymnasium and then philosophy and theology at Charles University in Prague. In 1800 he entered the Austrian army against Napoleon. After graduating from a university he escaped to the theatre.

== Theatre career ==
In 1803–1805, he affiliated with actors of the Patriotic Theatre who played in Malá Strana in Prague. He started translating plays. In 1807 he became a prompter in Malá Strana Theatre. In 1812 he started his career at Estates Theatre. He was responsible for plays performed in Czech on Sunday afternoons by Czech amateur actors. He wrote and translated more than a hundred plays for them. He worked as a ticket agent, secretary and eventually as one of three directors of the theatre.

== Work ==
His work is not of high quality but was highly reputable at his time for patriotic merit. Among his plays are Čech a Němec ('Czech and German') and Břetislav První, český Achilles ('Břetislav I, Czech Achilles'). Among his most successful translations were works of Wenzel Müller or Adolf Bäuerle. He also translated Mozart's opera Don Giovanni and supplied the Czech opera ensemble with a lot of librettos.

== See also ==
- Czech National Revival
- Karel Hynek Mácha
