= Máj =

Poem by Karel Hynek Mácha

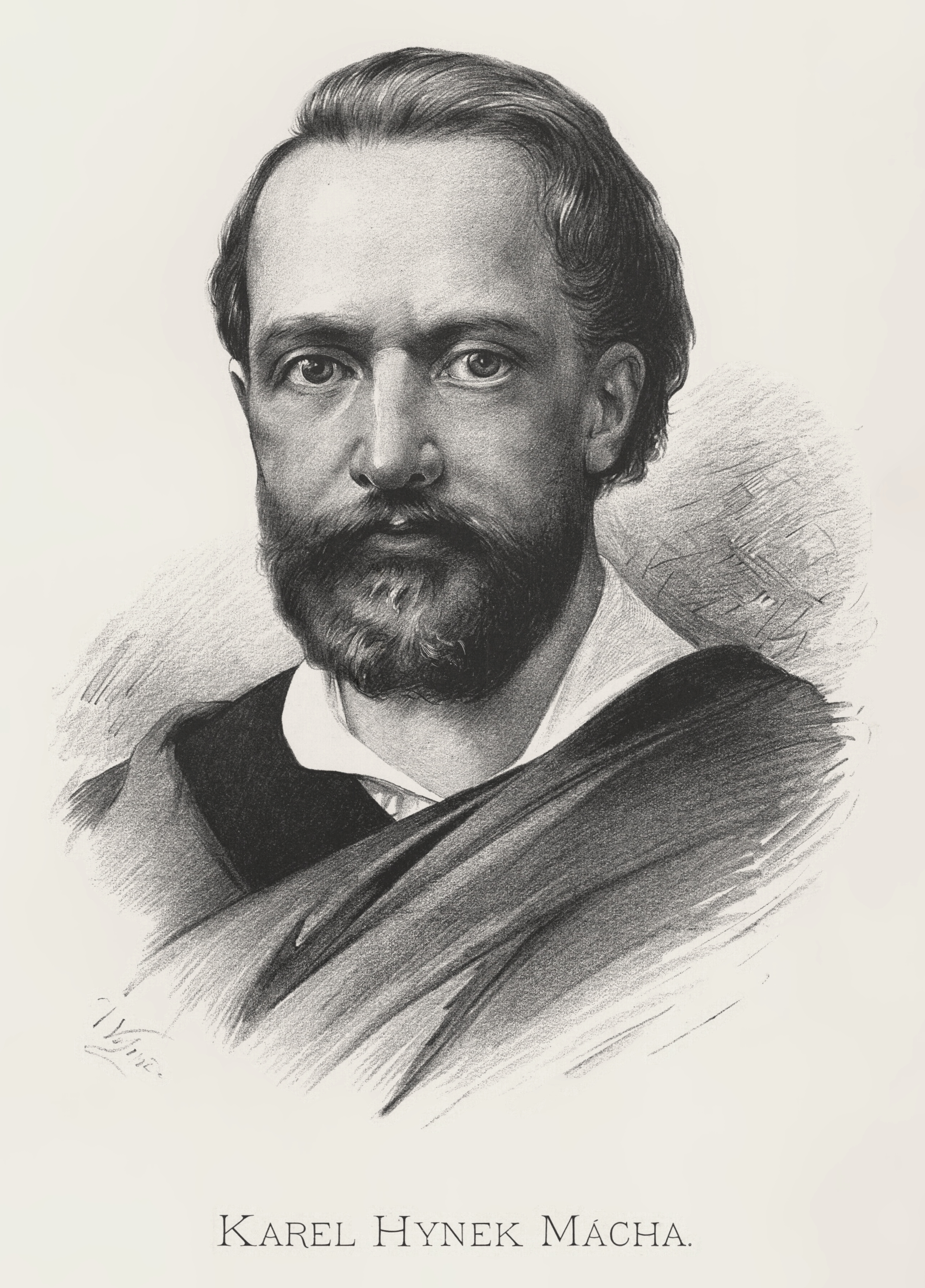
- Karel Hynek Mácha, engraving by Jan Vilímek
- Author: Karel Hynek Mácha
- Language: Czech
- Genre: narrative poem
- Publisher: self-published
- Publication date: 1836
- Publication place: Czech Republic
- Media type: Print

Máj (Czech for the month May; pronounced [maːj]; usually květen) is a romantic poem by Karel Hynek Mácha in four cantos. It was fiercely criticized when first published, but since then has gained the status of one of the most prominent works of Czech literature; in the Czech Republic, the poem is usually on must-read list for students and is said to be one of the most often published original Czech books with over 250 editions.

== Setting ==
According to the author's epilogue, the poem is a homage to the beauty of spring. It is set in a bucolic landscape, inspired by such features as a lake then called Big Pond (Czech: Velký rybník), and now called Lake Mácha (Czech: Máchovo jezero), after the poet. The poem's action takes place near the town of Hiršberg. Castles such as Bezděz, Karlštejn, and Křivoklát (Mácha was an avid walker and knew Central Bohemia intimately) also influence the setting of the poem.

== Dramatis personae ==
As a dramatic poem (in the byronic sense), the poem has a cast of characters: Vilém, a bandit, in love with Jarmila; Jarmila, a girl in love with Vilém but dishonoured by Vilém's father; and Hynek, the narrator.

== Plot ==
A young girl, Jarmila, has been seduced by a man who is killed by his own son, Vilém; the latter is a robber known as the "terrible forest lord". On the evening of 1 May, sitting on a hill by a lake, she awaits his coming, but is instead told by one of Vilém's associates that her lover sits across the lake in a castle, to be executed for the murder. While he waits, he ponders on the beauty of nature and his young life. The next day, he is led to a hill where he is decapitated; his mangled limbs are displayed in a wheel fastened to a pillar, and his head is placed on top of the pillar. Seven years later, on 31 December, a traveler named Hynek comes across Vilém's pallid skull and the next day is told the story by an innkeeper. Years later, on the evening of 1 May, he returns and compares his own life to the month of May.

=== Example ===
Byl pozdní večer – první máj –

Večerní máj – byl lásky čas.

Hrdliččin zval ku lásce hlas,

Kde borový zaváněl háj.

O lásce šeptal tichý mech;

Květoucí strom lhal lásky žel,

Svou lásku slavík růži pěl,

Růžinu jevil vonný vzdech.

Jezero hladké v křovích stinných

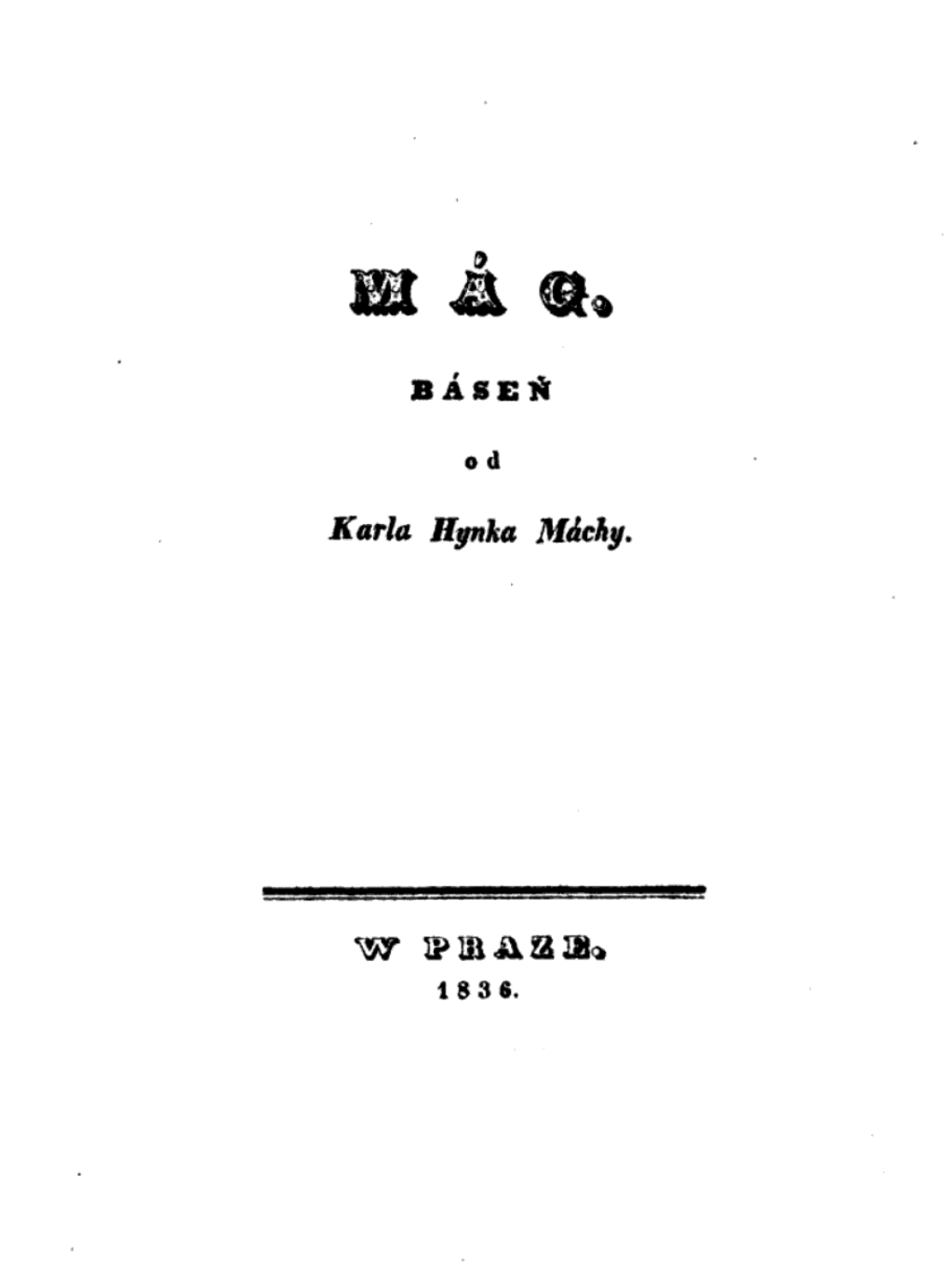
Original edition of Máj (1836).

Zvučelo temně tajný bol,

Břeh je objímal kol a kol;

A slunce jasná světů jiných

Bloudila blankytnými pásky,

Planoucí tam co slzy lásky.

==== Translation (artistic) ====
Late evening, on the first of May—

The twilit May—the time of love.

Meltingly called the turtle-dove,

Where rich and sweet pinewoods lay.

Whispered of love the mosses frail,

The flowering tree as sweetly lied,

The rose's fragrant sigh replied

To love-songs of the nightingale.

In shadowy woods the burnished lake

Darkly complained a secret pain,

By circling shores embraced again;

And heaven's clear sun leaned down to take

A road astray in azure deeps,

Like burning tears the lover weeps.

== Structure ==
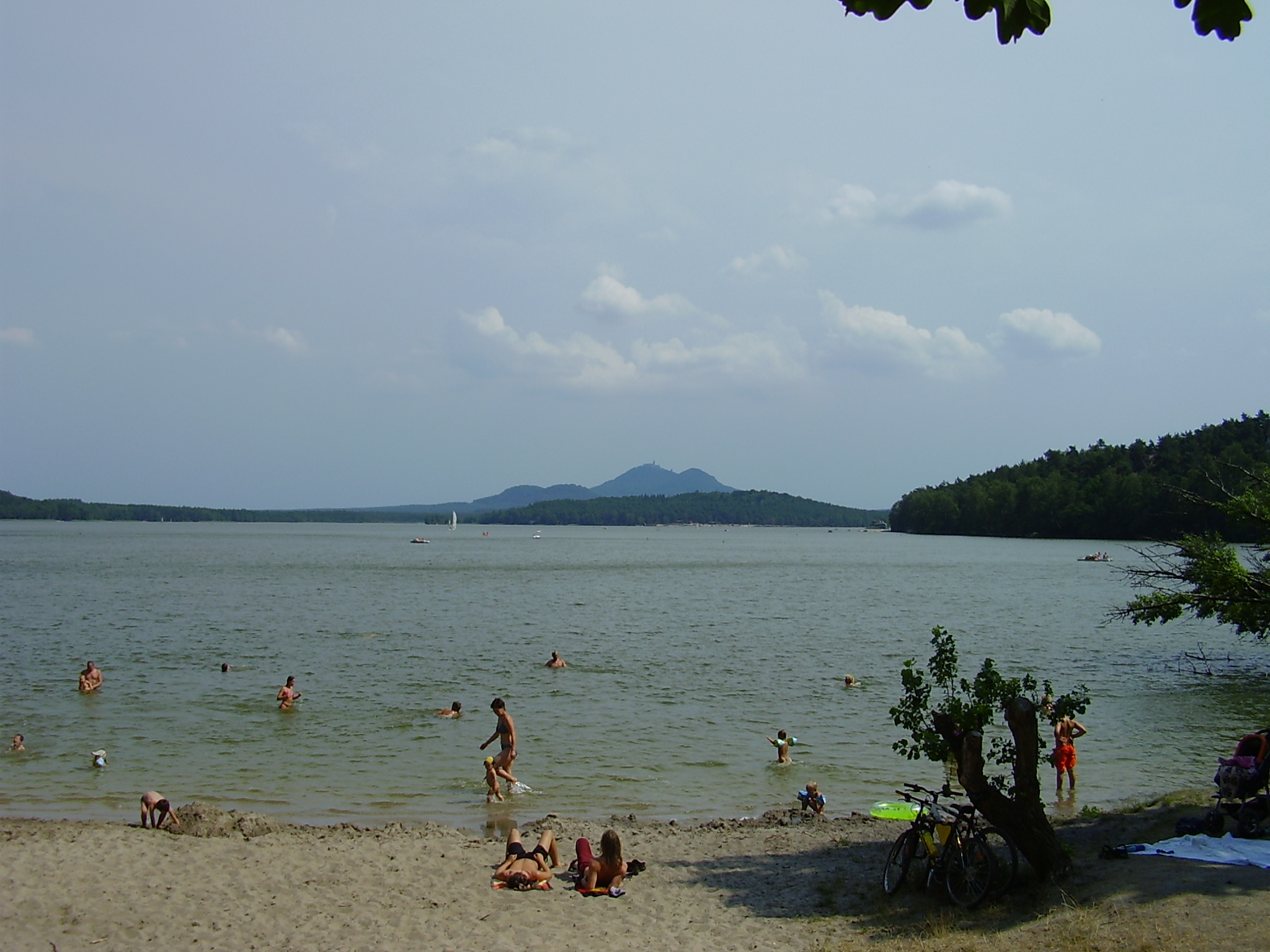
Lake Mácha

The poem consists of four cantos and two intermezzos.

=== First canto ===
The poem opens with a description of the lake and the night sky on the evening of 1 May; everything speaks of love—the turtle-dove, whose call ends Cantos 1, 3, and 4; the silent moss; and the nightingale. Jarmila awaits her lover anxiously under an oak tree, but instead is met by a boatman, a man she knows and presumably a member of Vilém's gang of robbers, who tells her that her lover is to be executed and curses her for having caused his death. The turtledove, closing the canto, cries "Jarmila! Jarmila!! Jarmila!!!"

=== Second canto ===
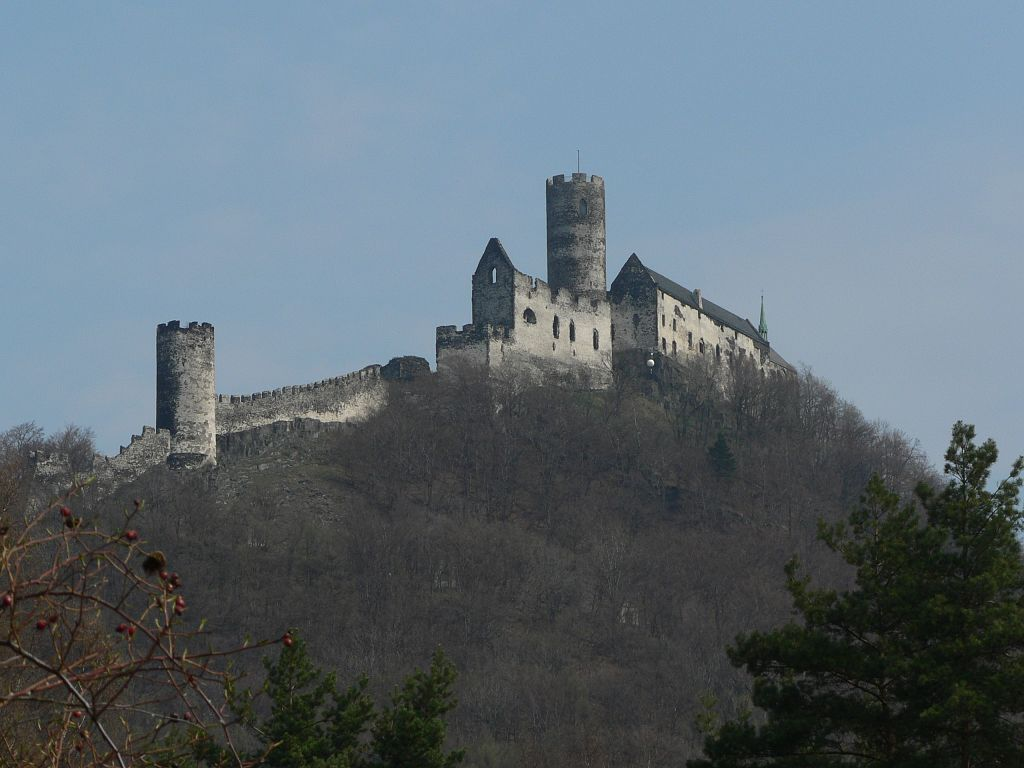
Bezděz Castle

On the same night, the lake is described from the other side, now with images of dying stars and the pale face of the moon prevailing. Vilém, locked in a tower overlooking the lake, is chained to a stone table and bewails his fate. Remembering his youth, he quickly recalls how his father drove him from that joyful place "to grow up in the midst of thieves"; he became the leader of their band, and was called the "terrible forest lord." He falls in love with a "wilted rose" and kills her seducer, not knowing it is his father. In his complaint, he claims the guilt was not his own; his curse is his father's. The clanking chains wake the prison guards, who goes to the cell and finds Vilém motionless and senseless at the table. Vilém whispers the story in the guard's ear—the tearful guard never retells the story and "no one ever saw a smile / on his pale face again."

=== First intermezzo ===
Midnight, in the countryside. A chorus of ghosts awaits the coming of a new dead soul, and especially the "guardian" of the burial site: as the author explains in a note, the last one buried stands guard over the graves at night until a newly buried person can take their place. Personified elements of the poem, such as the gale over the lake, the pillar with wheel, night, and the moon speak out on what they will contribute to the funeral. The mole under the earth, for instance, will dig his grave. This continues until the break of day.

=== Third canto ===
On the morning of 2 May, Vilém is led from his prison to the place of execution. The setting is as beautiful as the spring—there is a sweet morning wind, and "every living creature celebrates young May." A crowd accompanies Vilém to the hillock where the stake and wheel stand; many pray for him. The convict, overlooking the beauty of the landscape, bewails how he will never see Nature's bounty again and apostrophizes the clouds, and calls out to earth, whom he calls "my cradle and my grave, my mother / my only homeland." In short order the executioner's sword flashes, the dead man's head "drops--bounces--bounces again," and his head and limbs are displayed on the pillar and the wheel. The canto ends with the turtledove crying "Vilém! Vilém!! Vilém!!!"

=== Second intermezzo ===
In the forest, under oak trees, Vilém's gang silently sits in a circle, in the middle of the night. All of nature whispers "Our leader's dead," the forests in the distance quake and echo the complaint, "Our lord is dead!"

=== Fourth canto ===
On the last day of the year, a traveler, seven years after these events, comes across the knoll where the stake and wheel still display Vilém's bones and skull. Fleeing to the town, he asks, the next morning, about the skeleton, and his innkeeper tells him the story. Returning many years later, on 1 May, he sits on the hill; nature has awoken again and again the nightingale sings while the wind plays through the hollow skull. He sits until nightfall, meditating on Vilém's life as well as his own, decrying "humanity's lost paradise, ... my lovely childhood." The poem ends with the turtledove, who "invites to love: / 'Hynek'!--Vilém!!--Jarmila!!!'"

== Rhyme and meter ==
The basic metrical unit is the iamb, unusual for the Czech poetry at that time, and probably inspired by English romanticism, particularly by George Gordon Byron. Czech medieval and folk poetry did not yet use word stress count as an element of prosody, while their Renaissance poetry was mainly dactylic.

Most of the poem rhymes in an ABBA pattern, and while most of the lines are tetrameters, some of the longer non-narrative lyrical descriptions consist of longer lines. Sometimes the poet uses longer dashes to indicate stops that are nonetheless part of the line, such as in the second canto, where the dripping of water measures out the convict's time: "zní--hyne--zní a hyne-- / zní--hyne--zní a hyne zas--" ("sound--die--sound and die-- / sound--die--sound and die again").

== Reception and criticism ==
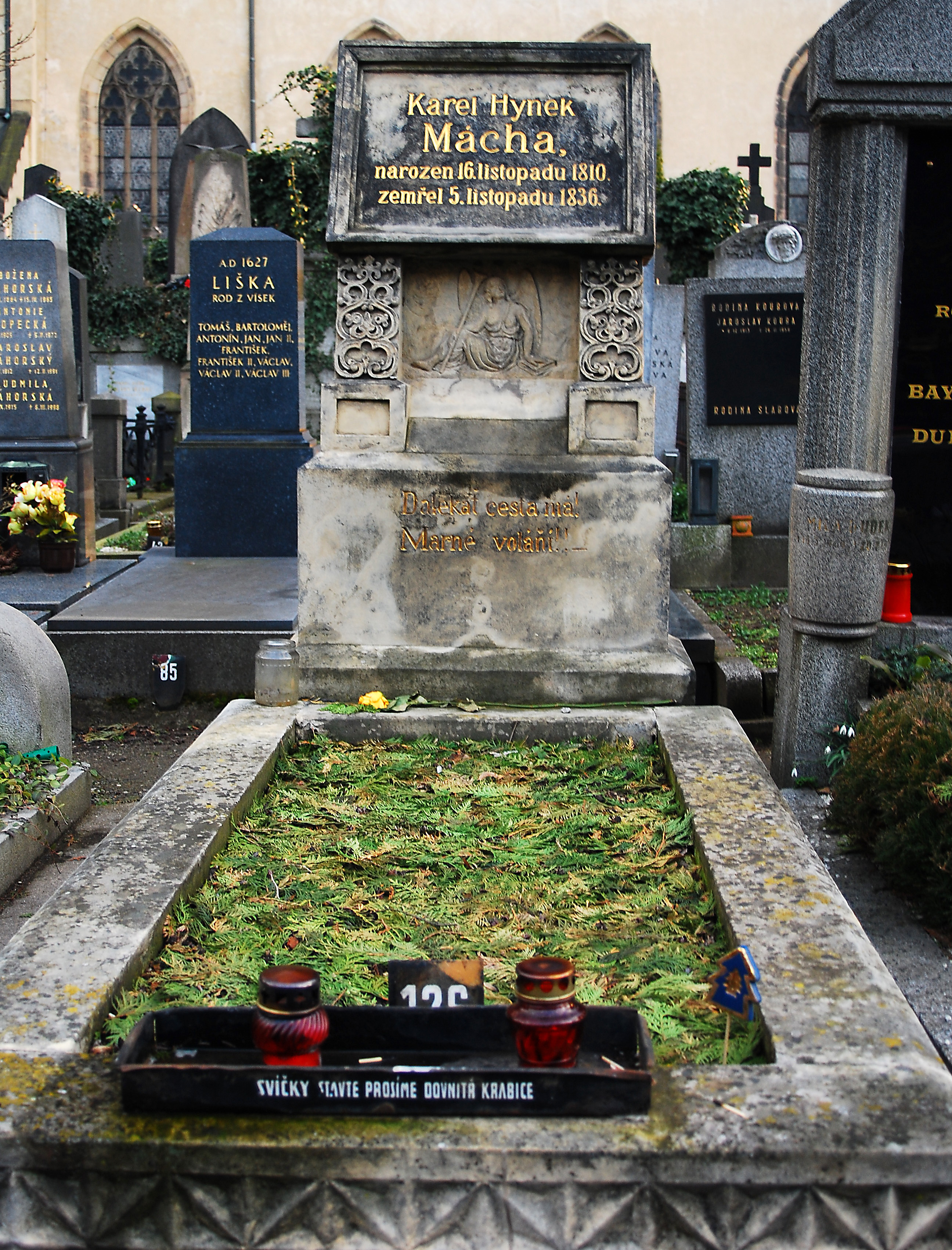
Mácha's grave in Prague

Mácha correctly estimates, in the opening remarks of his poem, that the poem is unlikely to be well received by his contemporaries: it "met with indifference and even hostility". Contemporary poet Josef Kajetán Tyl satirized Mácha's persona in "Rozervanec", and František Palacký, a leading figure in the Czech National Revival, likewise criticized the poet's talent (commentary that Mácha himself referred to in an 1835 diary entry).

As with many poets, of particular interest to scholars is the relationship between Mácha himself and his poetic work, which is "intensely personal, almost confessional." Roman Jakobson, for instance, published an essay called "Co je poesie?", focused on Mácha and his Máj, in which he "calls attention to the stark contrast between the devotional reverence of Macha's love poem and the cynically coarse references to its heroine in the poet's diary." This problem is "solved" in reference to the demands of literary genre: "The formulae of love poetry encouraged, indeed urged upon the poet, the tone of adoration, of worship."

== Movie version ==
The Czech short Vidíš-li poutníka ... made in 1966 by Jiří Gold and Vladimír Skalský is an experimental film about Máj quoting the poem, the poet's diary and his critiques.

In 2008, Czech director F. A. Brabec made a movie, also called Máj, based on the poem.
