= Cikáni =

1835 novel by Karel Hynek Mácha

Cikáni (lit. 'Gypsies') is an 1835 novel written by Czech poet Karel Hynek Mácha with typical tokens of Romanticism: old castles, night scenery and a romantic complicated plot. It is Mácha's only completed novel.

== Plot ==
The scenery of the novel is inspired by Kokořín Castle and its surroundings. The castle is under the rule of Earl Valdermar. Two gypsies come to an inn under the castle. Neither is an ethnic gypsy, but they accepted the lifestyle of nomads. The older one was originally a Venetian gondolier, Giacomo, who is traveling to find the kidnapper of his girlfriend Angelina. The young one is a waif adopted as his son. In the inn they meet Lea, an old Jewish owner's daughter, who falls in love with the young gypsy. She is slightly mad. The old Jew tells a story of a former owner of the inn who was a woman named Angelina, with a son. She has disappeared, no one knows where.

The gypsies spend the night in the woods where they encounter a very mad lady (repeating just one sentence: "It was not me but him"). She then confesses to the young gypsy, who is jealous because of Lea, that she brought her to the Earl to be raped. A character of Bárta Flákoň appears who tells lies about his own life, but gossips truly about others. He reveals to the gypsies that Earl Valdemar kidnapped Angelina in Italy and brought her to his castle, so the old gypsy comes to the castle and kills Valdemar. The gypsies are arrested then, but a letter left by Valdemar reveals that the young gypsy is the Earl's bastard and heir. The old gypsy is executed. Lea committed suicide; her father dies of sorrow. The only character who is left alone in despair is the young "gypsy" now called "young Valdemar", who does not accept his father's property and continues the life of a free gypsy. "My father! – father seduced my mother – no, he killed my mother – through my mother – no, he through my mother seduced my lover – seduced my father's lover – my mother – and my father killed – my father."

== Mácha's interest in gypsies ==
For Mácha gypsies were symbols of freedom and life in accordance with natural laws. In his notes he wrote about the beauty of gypsy women, their wailing choir singing and their love of nature. In Ausland magazine (July 1830) he is empathic to the gypsy lot – travel from place to place as a chase which brings them a lifestyle similar to that of animals – but their animals are human in the view of humanism – "a bitch is breast-feeding a piglet, a sow is suckling a dog". Mácha feels similar sympathy for Jews.
