= Cheating Death (disambiguation) =

Cheating death is an English idiom. It may also refer to:

- Cheating Death with Dr. Stephen T. Colbert, D.F.A., a recurring segment on The Colbert Report
- Cheating Death (novel), a book by crime fiction writer H. R. F. Keating
- Cheating Death: The Doctors and Medical Miracles that Are Saving Lives Against All Odds, a book by American neurosurgeon Dr. Sanjay Gupta
- "Cheating Death", an episode of Deadliest Catch
- "Cheating Death" (CSI: Miami episode), a Season 7 episode of CSI: Miami

== See also ==
- The Man Who Could Cheat Death, a 1959 film
