= CAPE-2 =

American amateur miniaturized satellite

- Mission type: Technology
- Operator: University of Louisiana at Lafayette
- COSPAR ID: 2013-064C
- SATCAT no.: 39382
- Website: CAPE-2
- Mission duration: 11 months, 3 days

Spacecraft properties
- Spacecraft type: 1U CubeSat
- Manufacturer: University of Louisiana at Lafayette
- Launch mass: 1 kg (2.2 lb)
- Dimensions: 10 cm × 10 cm × 10 cm (3.9 in × 3.9 in × 3.9 in)

Start of mission
- Launch date: 20 November 2013, 01:15 UTC
- Rocket: Minotaur I
- Launch site: Wallops LA-0B
- Contractor: Northrop Grumman

End of mission
- Decay date: 23 October 2014

Orbital parameters
- Reference system: Geocentric
- Regime: Low Earth
- Perigee altitude: 498 km (309 mi)
- Apogee altitude: 500 km (310 mi)
- Inclination: 40.51°
- Period: 93.4 minutes
- Epoch: 20 November 2013

CAPE-2 (Cajun Advanced Picosatellite Experiment 2), or Louisiana-OSCAR 75, was an American amateur miniaturized satellite developed by students at the University of Louisiana at Lafayette.

== Background ==
The purpose of CAPE 2 is to gather data while orbiting in space and transmit this data to the ground station on the University of Louisiana at Lafayette campus. The team of engineering students runs experiments and maintain the satellite while in orbit.

As part of NASA's Educational Launch of Nanosatellites (ELaNa) educational launch of nanosatellites program, CAPE-2 was launched with the following payloads: a Voice Repeater, Text to Speech, Tweeting, Digipeater, File Storage and Transfers, and DTMF Query.

== Status ==
On October 23, 2014, the CAPE-2 satellite re-entered the atmosphere.

== See also ==
- List of CubeSats
- CAPE-1
