= List of Deadliest Catch episodes =

Deadliest Catch is a documentary television series produced by Original Productions for the Discovery Channel. It portrays the real-life events aboard fishing vessels in the Bering Sea during the Alaskan king crab, bairdi crab, and opilio crab fishing seasons.

The Aleutian Islands port of Dutch Harbor, Alaska, is the base of operations for the fishing fleet. The show's title derives from the inherent high risk of injury or death associated with the work.

Deadliest Catch premiered on the Discovery Channel on April 12, 2005, and the show currently airs worldwide. The first season consisted of ten episodes, with the finale airing on June 14, 2005. Subsequent seasons have aired on the same April to June/July schedule every year since the original 2005 season, with more recent seasons airing until August/September.

== Series overview ==
Season	Episodes	Originally aired	
Season	Episodes	First aired	Last aired
1	10	April 12, 2005	June 14, 2005
2	12	March 28, 2006	June 13, 2006
3	12	April 3, 2007	June 19, 2007
4	16	April 15, 2008	July 22, 2008
5	16	April 14, 2009	July 28, 2009
6	16	April 13, 2010	July 27, 2010
7	16	April 12, 2011	July 26, 2011
8	16	April 10, 2012	July 24, 2012
9	16	April 16, 2013	July 30, 2013
10	16	April 22, 2014	August 5, 2014
11	18	April 14, 2015	August 18, 2015
12	18	March 29, 2016	August 2, 2016
13	19	April 11, 2017	August 29, 2017
14	19	April 10, 2018	August 28, 2018
15	21	April 9, 2019	September 10, 2019
16	23	April 14, 2020	September 22, 2020
17	22	March 19, 2021	September 21, 2021
18	23	April 19, 2022	September 27, 2022
19	22	April 18, 2023	September 26, 2023
20	19	June 11, 2024	October 22, 2024
21	16	August 1, 2025	October 31, 2025
22	19	May 8, 2026	September 25, 2026

== Episodes ==
=== Season 1 (2005) ===
No. overall	No. in season	Title	Original release date
1	1	"Greenhorns"	April 12, 2005
2	2	"Long Sleepless Nights"	April 19, 2005
3	3	"Lady Luck"	April 26, 2005
4	4	"Beat the Clock"	May 3, 2005
5	5	"Dead of Winter"	May 10, 2005
6	6	"Man Overboard"	May 17, 2005
7	7	"High Hopes"	May 24, 2005
8	8	"Good Fishing"	May 31, 2005
9	9	"The Clock's Ticking"	June 7, 2005
10	10	"The Final Run"	June 14, 2005

=== Season 2 (2006) ===
No. overall	No. in season	Title	Original release date
11	1	"Heading Out to Sea"	March 28, 2006
12	2	"Batten Down the Hatches"	April 4, 2006
13	3	"On the Crab"	April 11, 2006
14	4	"Finish Line"	April 18, 2006
15	5	"Friends and Rivals"	April 25, 2006
16	6	"A New Hunt Begins"	May 2, 2006
17	7	"Smoke on the Water"	May 9, 2006
18	8	"Man vs. Ice"	May 16, 2006
19	9	"On the Edge"	May 23, 2006
20	10	"Pribilof Stare"	May 30, 2006
21	11	"Race Against the Ice"	June 6, 2006
22	12	"Cashing In"	June 13, 2006

=== Season 3 (2007) ===
No. overall	No. in season	Title	Original release date	Viewers (millions)
23	1	"A Tragic Beginning"	April 3, 2007	3.4
24	2	"The Unforgiving Sea"	April 10, 2007	N/A
25	3	"Pain and Paybacks"	April 17, 2007	N/A
26	4	"Cheating Death"	April 24, 2007	3.4
27	5	"Bering Sea Salvation"	May 1, 2007	N/A
28	6	"The Last Lap"	May 8, 2007	3.0
29	7	"New Beginnings"	May 15, 2007	N/A
30	8	"Caught in the Storm"	May 22, 2007	3.5
31	9	"Crossing the Line"	May 29, 2007	N/A
32	10	"Trials of the Greenhorns"	June 5, 2007	3.1
33	11	"Ice and Open Water"	June 12, 2007	3.5
34	12	"A Frozen Finish"	June 19, 2007	4.1

=== Season 4 (2008) ===
No. overall	No. in season	Title	Original release date	Viewers (millions)
35	1	"Get 'Em Back Safe!"	April 15, 2008	3.53
36	2	"Striking Out"	April 15, 2008	3.39
37	3	"A Numbers Game"	April 22, 2008	N/A
38	4	"Unsafe and Unsound"	April 29, 2008	N/A
39	5	"No Mercy"	May 6, 2008	N/A
40	6	"Racing The Clock"	May 13, 2008	N/A
41	7	"Seeking the Catch"	May 20, 2008	N/A
42	8	"No Season for Old Men"	May 27, 2008	N/A
43	9	"Storm Season"	June 3, 2008	N/A
44	10	"Blow Up"	June 10, 2008	N/A
45	11	"Big Weather, Big Trouble"	June 17, 2008	N/A
46	12	"Mortal Men"	June 24, 2008	N/A
47	13	"Fresh Blood"	July 1, 2008	3.41
48	14	"Changing Tides"	July 8, 2008	3.46
49	15	"Catch as Catch Can"	July 15, 2008	N/A
50	16	"The Final Hour"	July 22, 2008	N/A

=== Season 5 (2009) ===
No. overall	No. in season	Title	Original release date	Viewers (millions)
51	1	"Everything on the Line"	April 14, 2009	4.16
52	2	"Red Skies in the Morning"	April 21, 2009	4.05
53	3	"Stay Focused or Die"	April 28, 2009	N/A
54	4	"Put Up or Shut Up"	May 5, 2009	N/A
55	5	"Long Haul, Short Fuses"	May 12, 2009	2.93
56	6	"Deadline"	May 19, 2009	2.55
57	7	"Down to the Wire"	May 26, 2009	3.20
58	8	"Payback Time"	June 2, 2009	N/A
59	9	"No Second Chances"	June 9, 2009	4.19
60	10	"Sea of Misery"	June 16, 2009	3.63
61	11	"Lockout"	June 23, 2009	N/A
62	12	"A Slap in the Face or a Kick in the Butt"	June 30, 2009	N/A
63	13	"Ends of the Earth"	July 7, 2009	N/A
64	14	"Bitter Tears"	July 14, 2009	N/A
65	15	"Day of Reckoning"	July 21, 2009	N/A
66	16	"Shipwrecked"	July 28, 2009	3.75

=== Season 6 (2010) ===
No. overall	No. in season	Title	Original release date	Viewers (millions)
67	1	"Slow Burn"	April 13, 2010	4.59
68	2	"Breaking 'Em In"	April 20, 2010	3.75
69	3	"Sea Tested"	April 27, 2010	3.51
70	4	"Bering Sea Swim Club"	May 4, 2010	3.68
71	5	"Arctic Quest"	May 11, 2010	3.70
72	6	"False Pass"	May 18, 2010	3.37
73	7	"When Hell Freezes Over"	May 25, 2010	3.32
74	8	"We're Not in Kansas Anymore..."	June 1, 2010	3.39
75	9	"Glory Days"	June 8, 2010	3.49
76	10	"The Darkened Seas"	June 15, 2010	N/A
77	11	"Blown Off Course"	June 22, 2010	5.37
78	12	"Empty Throne"	June 29, 2010	5.24
79	13	"Cain and Abel"	July 6, 2010	5.27
80	14	"Redemption Day"	July 13, 2010	8.55
81	15	"Valhalla"	July 20, 2010	5.47
82	16	"Endless"	July 27, 2010	4.90

=== Season 7 (2011) ===
No. overall	No. in season	Title	Original release date	Viewers (millions)
83	1	"New Blood"	April 12, 2011	4.38
84	2	"Proving Grounds"	April 19, 2011	3.88
85	3	"Old Age & Treachery"	April 26, 2011	3.58
86	4	"Breaking Point"	May 3, 2011	3.27
87	5	"A Wing and a Prayer"	May 10, 2011	2.90
88	6	"Exit Wounds"	May 17, 2011	3.19
89	7	"Thick as Thieves"	May 24, 2011	3.52
90	8	"Graduation Day"	May 31, 2011	3.58
91	9	"Sea Change"	June 7, 2011	3.22
92	10	"Frontier Medicine"	June 14, 2011	3.63
93	11	"Birds, Bones and Blood"	June 21, 2011	3.65
94	12	"It's Not All Mai-Tais & Yahtzee"	June 28, 2011	3.00
95	13	"Pirate School"	July 5, 2011	3.23
96	14	"The Island"	July 12, 2011	2.98
97	15	"I Smell a Nightmare"	July 19, 2011	3.01
98	16	"Mohawks & Madness, Goodness & Gladness"	July 26, 2011	3.29

=== Season 8 (2012) ===
No. overall	No. in season	Title	Original release date	Viewers (millions)
99	1	"The Gamble"	April 10, 2012	2.17
100	2	"Turf War"	April 17, 2012	2.67
101	3	"Weak Links"	April 24, 2012	2.13
102	4	"The Hook"	May 1, 2012	2.61
103	5	"Alien Abduction"	May 8, 2012	2.69
104	6	"Vital Signs"	May 15, 2012	2.68
105	7	"I Don't Wanna Die"	May 22, 2012	3.25
106	8	"The Aftermath"	May 29, 2012	2.99
107	9	"Nowhere to Go But Down"	June 5, 2012	3.05
108	10	"Rise and Fall"	June 12, 2012	2.67
109	11	"No Exit"	June 19, 2012	2.81
110	12	"Collision Course"	June 26, 2012	3.16
111	13	"Landlocked"	July 3, 2012	2.71
112	14	"Fearless Leaders"	July 10, 2012	0.78
113	15	"Release the Beast"	July 17, 2012	3.06
114	16	"The Bitter, Bloody End"	July 24, 2012	2.87

=== Season 9 (2013) ===
No. overall	No. in season	Title	Original release date	Viewers (millions)
115	1	"Mutiny on the Bering Sea"	April 16, 2013	3.47
116	2	"Dagger in the Back"	April 23, 2013	3.05
117	3	"Blood in the Morning"	April 30, 2013	2.80
118	4	"The Crooke & The Tangler"	May 7, 2013	2.67
119	5	"Judgment Day"	May 14, 2013	2.71
120	6	"Fist to the Face"	May 21, 2013	2.45
121	7	"Goodbye Jake"	May 28, 2013	3.08
122	8	"Kicking off with a Bang"	June 4, 2013	3.08
123	9	"The Storm of the Season"	June 11, 2013	2.83
124	10	"Sleeping with the Enemy"	June 18, 2013	2.45
125	11	"We're Not Gonna Take It"	June 25, 2013	2.62
126	12	"Listing Lovers"	July 2, 2013	2.67
127	13	"So You Wanna Be a Boat Owner..."	July 9, 2013	3.06
128	14	"Ship of Iron, Men of Steel"	July 16, 2013	2.41
129	15	"Man Overboard"	July 23, 2013	3.13
130	16	"The Final Battle"	July 30, 2013	2.91

=== Season 10 (2014) ===
No. overall	No. in season	Title	Original release date	Viewers (millions)
131	1	"Careful What You Wish For"	April 22, 2014	3.82
132	2	"Family Affair"	April 29, 2014	3.11
133	3	"Darwin's Law"	May 6, 2014	2.79
134	4	"Against the Law"	May 13, 2014	2.71
135	5	"On the Rocks"	May 20, 2014	2.84
136	6	"Falling Down"	May 27, 2014	2.92
137	7	"Lost at Sea"	June 3, 2014	3.02
138	8	"Cornelia Marie Blue"	June 10, 2014	3.07
139	9	"Skipper Harris in Training"	June 17, 2014	3.02
140	10	"Fisherman's Daughter"	June 24, 2014	3.14
141	11	"Blonde Ambition"	July 1, 2014	2.93
142	12	"Women Drivers"	July 8, 2014	2.89
143	13	"Greatest Game Ever Fished"	July 15, 2014	2.81
144	14	"Breaking Mandy"	July 22, 2014	2.49
145	15	"Sabotage"	July 29, 2014	2.75
146	16	"You'll Know My Name Is The Lord..."	August 5, 2014	2.51

=== Season 11 (2015) ===
No. overall	No. in season	Title	Original release date	Viewers (millions)
147	1	"A Brotherhood Tested"	April 14, 2015	3.22
148	2	"Prodigal Son"	April 21, 2015	2.72
149	3	"The Ultimatum"	April 28, 2015	2.81
150	4	"Super Typhoon Part 1"	May 5, 2015	2.56
151	5	"Super Typhoon Part 2"	May 12, 2015	2.72
152	6	"Wasted Talent"	May 19, 2015	2.68
153	7	"Heavy Lies the Crown"	May 26, 2015	2.44
154	8	"Zero Hour"	June 2, 2015	3.06
155	9	"Hell's Bells"	June 9, 2015	2.44
156	10	"Lunatic Fringe"	June 16, 2015	2.39
157	11	"New Captain on the Block"	June 23, 2015	2.69
158	12	"5-Year Storm Part 1"	June 30, 2015	2.62
159	13	"5-Year Storm Part 2"	July 14, 2015	2.45
160	14	"Bite the Hand"	July 21, 2015	2.34
161	15	"New Blood, Old Wounds"	July 28, 2015	2.34
162	16	"Beastmode"	August 4, 2015	2.34
163	17	"I'm the Captain"	August 11, 2015	2.19
164	18	"We Have Not Yet Begun to Fight"	August 18, 2015	2.42

=== Season 12 (2016) ===
No. overall	No. in season	Title	Original release date	Viewers (millions)
165	1	"Carpe Diem"	March 29, 2016	2.55
166	2	"First Timers"	April 5, 2016	2.27
167	3	"No Good Deed"	April 12, 2016	2.42
168	4	"Swedish Twins"	April 19, 2016	1.93
169	5	"Million Dollar Bet"	April 26, 2016	2.28
170	6	"100 Percent Injury Rate"	May 3, 2016	2.21
171	7	"Cold War"	May 10, 2016	2.07
172	8	"Winter Is Coming"	May 17, 2016	2.13
173	9	"Into The Gale"	May 24, 2016	2.01
174	10	"Proving Grounds"	May 31, 2016	2.25
175	11	"Raw Deal"	June 7, 2016	0.63
176	12	"Settling The Score"	June 14, 2016	1.94
177	13	"Fire At Sea Part 1"	June 21, 2016	1.94
178	14	"Fire At Sea Part 2"	July 5, 2016	2.03
179	15	"Blood and Guts"	July 12, 2016	1.71
180	16	"Life or Death Decision"	July 19, 2016	1.87
181	17	"The Widowmaker Part 1"	July 26, 2016	1.94
182	18	"The Widowmaker Part 2"	August 2, 2016	2.21

=== Season 13 (2017) ===
No. overall	No. in season	Title	Original release date	Viewers (millions)
183	1	"Uncharted Territory"	April 11, 2017	2.21
184	2	"Seismic Shift"	April 18, 2017	2.09
185	3	"Down in Flames"	April 25, 2017	2.26
186	4	"Crushing Blows"	May 2, 2017	1.90
187	5	"Bad Moon"	May 9, 2017	1.89
188	6	"Hail Mary, Full of Crab"	May 16, 2017	2.03
189	7	"Poisoned at Sea"	May 23, 2017	1.74
190	8	"40-Foot Monsters"	May 30, 2017	2.03
191	9	"The Russian Line"	June 6, 2017	1.77
192	10	"Back to the Killing Season"	June 13, 2017	1.83
193	11	"Hurricane Alley"	June 20, 2017	1.79
194	12	"Arctic Mega Storm"	June 27, 2017	1.71
195	13	"Dead-Stick"	July 11, 2017	1.59
196	14	"450 Mile Storm"	July 18, 2017	1.80
197	15	"Respect Earned"	August 1, 2017	1.50
198	16	"Man Down"	August 8, 2017	1.63
199	17	"Hillstrand's Last Catch"	August 15, 2017	1.63
200	18	"Lost at Sea"	August 22, 2017	1.72
201	19	"Last Damn Arctic Storm"	August 29, 2017	1.89

=== Season 14 (2018) ===
No. overall	No. in season	Title	Original release date	Viewers (millions)
202	1	"Battle Lines"	April 10, 2018	2.11
203	2	"First Blood"	April 17, 2018	1.85
204	3	"Dead in the Water"	April 24, 2018	2.04
205	4	"Salt Wounds"	May 1, 2018	1.75
206	5	"Collision Void"	May 8, 2018	1.71
207	6	"Arctic Hurricane"	May 15, 2018	1.70
208	7	"Clash of Kings"	May 22, 2018	1.62
209	8	"Becoming Captain"	May 29, 2018	1.84
210	9	"Purgatory"	June 5, 2018	1.72
211	10	"Winter's Curse"	June 12, 2018	1.66
212	11	"Blackout"	June 19, 2018	1.66
213	12	"Winter's Fury"	June 26, 2018	1.66
214	13	"Baptism by Fire"	July 10, 2018	1.55
215	14	"Supermoon Storm"	July 17, 2018	1.65
216	15	"Greenhorn Overboard"	July 31, 2018	1.64
217	16	"Turf Wars"	August 7, 2018	1.57
218	17	"No Safe Harbor"	August 14, 2018	1.57
219	18	"Blood & Water"	August 21, 2018	1.56
220	19	"Storm Surge"	August 28, 2018	1.62

=== Season 15 (2019) ===
No. overall	No. in season	Title	Original release date	Viewers (millions)
221	1	"Battle of Kings"	April 9, 2019	1.47
222	2	"Super Swarm"	April 16, 2019	1.39
223	3	"Knife in the Ribs"	April 23, 2019	1.38
224	4	"Single Point of Failure"	April 30, 2019	1.23
225	5	"Shifting Stack"	May 7, 2019	1.34
226	6	"Blood in the Water"	May 14, 2019	1.19
227	7	"Winter is Here"	May 21, 2019	1.26
228	8	"Tough Inheritance"	May 28, 2019	1.48
229	9	"Russian Roulette"	June 4, 2019	1.38
230	10	"Curse Of The Russian Line"	June 11, 2019	1.54
231	11	"Hell Hath No Fury"	June 18, 2019	1.40
232	12	"Sixty Foot Monster"	June 25, 2019	1.42
233	13	"Crane Wreck"	July 9, 2019	1.48
234	14	"Devil's Cut"	July 16, 2019	1.48
235	15	"Unbreakable"	July 23, 2019	1.50
236	16	"Hell or High Water"	August 6, 2019	1.50
237	17	"Unholy Alliance"	August 13, 2019	1.44
238	18	"Dark Ship"	August 20, 2019	1.27
239	19	"Time and Tide Wait for No Man"	August 27, 2019	1.33
240	20	"Dead or Alive"	September 3, 2019	1.22
241	21	"Now or Never"	September 10, 2019	1.22

=== Season 16 (2020) ===
No. overall	No. in season	Title	Original release date	Viewers (millions)
242	1	"Cold War Rivals"	April 14, 2020	1.71
243	2	"Typhoon Hagibis"	April 21, 2020	1.58
244	3	"Breaking Point"	April 28, 2020	1.71
245	4	"Shotguns and Fist Fights"	May 5, 2020	1.62
246	5	"Double Agent"	May 12, 2020	1.62
247	6	"The Bleeding Edge"	May 19, 2020	1.42
248	7	"Into The Red"	May 26, 2020	1.28
249	8	"Mayday Mayday"	June 2, 2020	1.40
250	9	"Cold War Heating Up"	June 9, 2020	1.63
251	10	"Harms Way"	June 16, 2020	1.46
252	11	"Chase Boat Rescue"	June 23, 2020	1.44
253	12	"Dutch Harbor Double Cross"	June 30, 2020	1.40
254	13	"Bomb Cyclone"	July 7, 2020	1.61
255	14	"Bering Sea Crash"	July 14, 2020	1.37
256	15	"Gut Instinct"	July 21, 2020	1.36
257	16	"Bering Sea Wrecking Ball"	July 28, 2020	1.36
258	17	"Danger Close"	August 4, 2020	1.34
259	18	"Like Father Like Daughter"	August 18, 2020	1.09
260	19	"Rogue Wave Juggernaut"	August 25, 2020	1.09
261	20	"A Problem Like Maria"	September 1, 2020	1.09
262	21	"End of the Beginning"	September 8, 2020	1.09
263	22	"Blood Is Thicker Than Water"	September 15, 2020	1.23
264	23	"Everything Changes"	September 22, 2020	1.43

=== Season 17 (2021) ===
In March 2021, Discovery announced that episodes of the show would also be streaming on their streaming platform Discovery+. The first episode aired on the streaming service on March 19, 2021, one month before the episode was scheduled to air on Discovery Channel. For the remainder of the season, Discovery+ released new episodes to its subscribers, one week before the episodes aired on Discovery Channel.

No. overall	No. in season	Title	Discovery+	Discovery Channel	Viewers (millions)
265	1	"Out of the Ashes"	March 19, 2021	April 20, 2021	1.15
266	2	"Russian Dragger"	April 20, 2021	April 27, 2021	1.51
267	3	"Point of No Return"	April 27, 2021	May 4, 2021	1.25
268	4	"Time Machine"	May 4, 2021	May 11, 2021	1.13
269	5	"Force Majeure"	May 11, 2021	May 18, 2021	1.17
270	6	"Restricted Zone"	May 18, 2021	May 25, 2021	0.98
271	7	"What Would Phil Harris Do?"	May 25, 2021	June 1, 2021	1.20
272	8	"Tangled Web"	June 1, 2021	June 8, 2021	1.29
273	9	"Dedication"	June 8, 2021	June 15, 2021	1.29
274	10	"Truth Will Set You Free"	June 15, 2021	June 22, 2021	1.07
275	11	"Shipbreakers"	June 22, 2021	June 29, 2021	1.07
276	12	"Extreme Arctic"	June 29, 2021	July 6, 2021	1.17
277	13	"Of Ice and Men"	July 13, 2021	July 20, 2021	1.03
278	14	"The Crush"	July 20, 2021	July 27, 2021	1.02
279	15	"Run Silent Run Deep"	July 27, 2021	August 3, 2021	0.94
280	16	"First Come First Served"	August 3, 2021	August 10, 2021	1.05
281	17	"Quid Pro Crab"	August 10, 2021	August 17, 2021	1.05
282	18	"Winter's Gambit"	August 17, 2021	August 24, 2021	1.02
283	19	"Wicked Game"	August 24, 2021	August 31, 2021	1.25
284	20	"Over the Rail"	August 31, 2021	September 7, 2021	1.04
285	21	"First in Line"	September 7, 2021	September 14, 2021	0.95
286	22	"The Ultimate Price"	September 14, 2021	September 21, 2021	1.36

=== Season 18 (2022) ===
In Season 18, in the wake of the cancellation of the red king crab season, several boats turned to other fisheries for survival, including golden king crab, dungeness crab, and black cod.

No. overall	No. in season	Title	Discovery+	Discovery Channel	Viewers (millions)
287	1	"Long Live King Crab!"	April 19, 2022	April 19, 2022	1.08
288	2	"No Sleep 'Till Rescue"	April 26, 2022	April 26, 2022	1.02
289	3	"One Hell of a Story to Tell"	May 3, 2022	May 3, 2022	0.86
290	4	"Invasive Russian Reds"	May 10, 2022	May 10, 2022	0.86
291	5	"Desperate Measures"	May 17, 2022	May 17, 2022	0.82
292	6	"Brother In The Bight"	May 24, 2022	May 24, 2022	0.92
293	7	"Follow the Rainbow"	May 31, 2022	May 31, 2022	1.05
294	8	"Deepest Alaska"	June 7, 2022	June 7, 2022	1.05
295	9	"Rip Tide"	June 14, 2022	June 14, 2022	1.05
296	10	"Dark Waters"	June 21, 2022	June 21, 2022	1.00
297	11	"No Good Deed Unpunished"	June 28, 2022	June 28, 2022	0.89
298	12	"Sailor's Delight"	July 5, 2022	July 5, 2022	0.75
299	13	"To The End Of The Earth"	July 12, 2022	July 12, 2022	0.76
300	14	"Where Eagles Dare"	July 19, 2022	July 19, 2022	0.76
301	15	"The Crush of Winter"	August 2, 2022	August 2, 2022	0.76
302	16	"No Turning Back"	August 9, 2022	August 9, 2022	0.73
303	17	"Operation Anvil Drop"	August 16, 2022	August 16, 2022	0.78
304	18	"Hell on the High Seas"	August 23, 2022	August 23, 2022	0.73
305	19	"Avian Apocalypse"	August 30, 2022	August 30, 2022	0.83
306	20	"Frozen"	September 6, 2022	September 6, 2022	0.73
307	21	"Graveyard of Gear"	September 13, 2022	September 13, 2022	0.90
308	22	"Sub-Zero Scramble"	September 20, 2022	September 20, 2022	0.81
309	23	"Port of Last Resort"	September 27, 2022	September 27, 2022	0.72

=== Season 19 (2023) ===
No. overall	No. in season	Title	Discovery+	Discovery Channel	Viewers (millions)
310	1	"Call of a New Generation"	April 18, 2023	April 18, 2023	0.87
311	2	"Wheelhouse Bound"	April 25, 2023	April 25, 2023	0.87
312	3	"Amazing Grace"	May 2, 2023	May 2, 2023	0.75
313	4	"Bering Sea Superstition"	May 9, 2023	May 9, 2023	0.67
314	5	"In Need Of Rescue"	May 16, 2023	May 16, 2023	0.80
315	6	"Blood and Treasure"	May 23, 2023	May 23, 2023	0.74
316	7	"Cold Hard World"	May 30, 2023	May 30, 2023	0.80
317	8	"Anchor Management"	June 6, 2023	June 6, 2023	0.87
318	9	"Million Dollar Season"	June 13, 2023	June 13, 2023	0.81
319	10	"Between Payday and Mayday"	June 20, 2023	June 20, 2023	0.84
320	11	"Loose Lips Sinking Ships"	June 27, 2023	June 27, 2023	0.81
321	12	"Tradition of Superstition"	July 11, 2023	July 11, 2023	N/A
322	13	"Victory at Sea"	July 18, 2023	July 18, 2023	N/A
323	14	"The Better Captain"	August 1, 2023	August 1, 2023	N/A
324	15	"Uncharted Grounds"	August 8, 2023	August 8, 2023	0.68
325	16	"Pain Level Ten"	August 15, 2023	August 15, 2023	0.78
326	17	"Dead Reckoning"	August 22, 2023	August 22, 2023	0.76
327	18	"Disorder on the Border"	August 29, 2023	August 29, 2023	0.83
328	19	"Beware the King Tide"	September 5, 2023	September 5, 2023	0.85
329	20	"Battleship"	September 12, 2023	September 12, 2023	0.85
330	21	"Last Stand of John Hillstrand"	September 19, 2023	September 19, 2023	0.74
331	22	"Nautical Deathtrap"	September 26, 2023	September 26, 2023	0.79

=== Season 20 (2024) ===
No. overall	No. in season	Title	Discovery+	Discovery Channel	Viewers (millions)
332	1	"King Crab Derby"	June 11, 2024	June 11, 2024	0.89
333	2	"Bering Sea Gut Check"	June 18, 2024	June 18, 2024	0.78
334	3	"A Titan Among Men"	June 25, 2024	June 25, 2024	0.89
335	4	"Lights Out"	July 2, 2024	July 2, 2024	0.84
336	5	"Twice Bitten, Twice Shy"	July 16, 2024	July 16, 2024	0.85
337	6	"The Purpose of Porpoises"	July 23, 2024	July 23, 2024	0.94
338	7	"Forged in Fury"	July 30, 2024	July 30, 2024	0.65
339	8	"Seaborne Sacrifice"	August 6, 2024	August 6, 2024	0.77
340	9	"A Wrinkle in Time"	August 13, 2024	August 13, 2024	0.81
341	10	"Under the Gun"	August 20, 2024	August 20, 2024	0.67
342	11	"Blow the Man Down"	August 27, 2024	August 27, 2024	0.83
343	12	"Raw Winter"	September 3, 2024	September 3, 2024	0.68
344	13	"Merciless Seas"	September 10, 2024	September 10, 2024	0.67
345	14	"Anchors Away"	September 17, 2024	September 17, 2024	0.66
346	15	"A Bridge Too Far"	September 24, 2024	September 24, 2024	0.84
347	16	"My Brother's Keeper"	October 1, 2024	October 1, 2024	0.90
348	17	"Out Cold"	October 8, 2024	October 8, 2024	0.87
349	18	"Graveyard for the Lost"	October 15, 2024	October 15, 2024	0.75
350	19	"Nothin' but Mammals"	October 22, 2024	October 22, 2024	0.79

=== Season 21 (2025) ===
No. overall	No. in season	Title	Discovery+	Discovery Channel	Viewers (millions)
351	1	"The Wild West"	August 1, 2025	August 1, 2025	0.82
352	2	"Abandon All but Hope"	August 8, 2025	August 8, 2025	0.78
353	3	"Typhoon Sea State"	August 15, 2025	August 15, 2025	0.73
354	4	"Mutiny on the Confidence"	August 22, 2025	August 22, 2025	0.66
355	5	"The Ship's Bell Tolls"	August 29, 2025	August 29, 2025	0.67
356	6	"Boarded on the Time Bandit"	September 5, 2025	September 5, 2025	0.61
357	7	"You're Fired, Mate!"	September 12, 2025	September 12, 2025	0.69
358	8	"Bering Sea Casino"	September 19, 2025	September 19, 2025	0.69
359	9	"Dire Straits"	September 26, 2025	September 26, 2025	0.81
360	10	"Rage Bait"	October 3, 2025	October 3, 2025	0.67
361	11	"Fail Fast, Fail Often"	October 10, 2025	October 10, 2025	0.67
362	12	"Kidney Punch"	October 17, 2025	October 17, 2025	0.58
363	13	"Ice Peril"	October 24, 2025	October 24, 2025	0.57
364	14	"Bring Out the Monster"	October 24, 2025	October 24, 2025	0.54
365	15	"Beyond the Breaking Point"	October 31, 2025	October 31, 2025	0.58
366	16	"Unfathomable"	October 31, 2025	October 31, 2025	0.60

=== Season 22 (2026) ===
No. overall	No. in season	Title	Discovery Channel	Discovery+	Viewers (millions)
367	1	"Kings of the Frozen North"	May 8, 2026	May 9, 2026	0.76
368	2	"Headlong Into Halong"	May 15, 2026	May 16, 2026	0.80
369	3	"Stack Fire"	May 22, 2026	May 23, 2026	0.81
370	4	"Hunger Game"	May 29, 2026	May 30, 2026	0.75
371	5	"Saltwater Runs Deep"	June 5, 2026	June 6, 2026	0.76
372	6	"Rocked to the Core"	June 12, 2026	June 13, 2026	0.77
373	7	"Wrong Side of the Law"	June 19, 2026	June 20, 2026	0.68
374	8	"Anything That Can Go Wrong"	June 26, 2026	June 27, 2026	0.80
375	9	"Nine Souls on Board"	July 10, 2026	July 11, 2026	0.82
376	10	"He's In the Water!"	July 17, 2026	July 18, 2026	0.95
377	11	"O Captain, My Captain"	July 24, 2026	July 25, 2026	0.83
378	12	"Crushing Ice"	August 7, 2026	August 8, 2026	N/A
379	13	"Those in Peril on the Sea"	August 14, 2026	August 15, 2026	N/A
380	14	"Curse of the Hybrids"	August 21, 2026	August 22, 2026	N/A
381	15	"Aleutian Solution"	August 28, 2026	August 29, 2026	N/A
382	16	"Contagion"	September 4, 2026	September 5, 2026	N/A
383	17	"Raw Nerves"	September 11, 2026	September 12, 2026	N/A
384	18	"Runaway Train"	September 18, 2026	September 19, 2026	N/A
385	19	"Father, Brother, Sailor, Son"	September 25, 2026	September 26, 2026	N/A

== Specials ==
Featured season	Title	Original release date	Viewers (millions)
0	"America's Deadliest Season: Alaskan Crab Fishing"	July 18, 2004	N/A
2	"Best of Season 1"	March 26, 2006	N/A
3	"Best of Season 2"	March 27, 2007	N/A
3	"Behind the Scenes of Season 3"	June 23, 2007	N/A
4	"Best of Season 3"	April 8, 2008	N/A
4	"Behind the Scenes of Season 4"	July 22, 2008	N/A
5	"Best of Season 4"	April 7, 2009	N/A
5	"Roughest and Toughest Moments"	July 19, 2009	N/A
5	"Behind the Scenes of Season 5"	July 27, 2009	N/A
5	"Best of Season 5: King Crab"	April 4, 2010	N/A
5	"Best of Season 5: Opilio Crab"	April 11, 2010	N/A
6	"Captain Phil Tribute"	July 20, 2010	5.54
6	"Behind the Scenes of Season 6"	July 25, 2010	N/A
7	"Best of Season 6"	April 7, 2011	N/A
7	"Greenhorns"	June 7, 2011	1.94
7	"Behind the Scenes of Season 7"	July 26, 2011	2.19
8	"Best of Season 7"	April 3, 2012	1.25
8	"Revelations"	July 31, 2012	1.68
8	"Behind the Scenes of Season 8"	August 7, 2012	1.41
9	"The Beginning"	April 9, 2013	1.48
9	"An Epic Season"	April 9, 2013	1.88
9	"Legend of the Time Bandit"	April 16, 2013	2.97
10	"Season 9 Revealed"	April 15, 2014	1.49
10	"Behind the Lens"	April 15, 2014	1.30
10	"Legend of the Northwestern"	April 29, 2014	2.10
10	"Behind the Lens: 10 Years in the Making"	August 8, 2014	0.84
11	"Season 10 Revealed"	April 7, 2015	1.58
11	"Legend of the Cornelia Marie"	April 21, 2015	2.28
12	"Best of the Northwestern"	March 8, 2016	1.21
12	"A Season in Hell"	March 22, 2016	0.76
12	"Legend of the Wizard"	April 5, 2016	1.73
12	"Captains of the Bering Sea"	August 9, 2016	N/A
12	"Sig Hansen Legacy"	August 23, 2016	1.43
13	"Legends Born And Broken"	April 4, 2017	N/A
13	"Evolution of Danger"	April 18, 2017	N/A
13	"The Legend of Wild Bill"	June 6, 2017	1.09
13	"A Hillstrand 4th of July"	July 4, 2017	1.34
13	"Johnathan Hillstrand Legacy"	September 5, 2017	N/A
14	"Captain vs. Captain"	April 3, 2018	1.13
14	"Legend of Jake Anderson"	April 24, 2018	1.28
14	"Coast Guard Heroes"	May 29, 2018	1.16
14	"Bering Sea Triangle"	July 3, 2018	1.48
15	"Unfinished Business"	April 2, 2019	0.89
15	"Legend of Sean Dwyer"	April 23, 2019	1.04
15	"Strategy and Deception"	April 30, 2019	0.90
15	"Tortured to Greatness"	May 7, 2019	0.88
15	"The Mystery of F/V Destination"	July 2, 2019	1.34
16	"Before the Catch with Mike Rowe"	April 7, 2020	0.96
16	"How to Beat the Russians"	April 7, 2020	0.84
16	"Casey and the New Cornelia Marie"	April 11, 2020	1.03
16	"The Harris Bloodline"	April 21, 2020	1.13
16	"Siberian Winter"	May 26, 2020	1.28
17	"Time Bandit Returns"	April 13, 2021	0.95
17	"Hell Is for Heroes"	April 13, 2021	0.87
17	"Succession"	September 28, 2021	0.82
18	"King Crab Is Dead"	April 12, 2022	0.70
18	"Life on the Line"	April 26, 2022	0.59
18	"Life on the Rail"	August 2, 2022	0.60
18	"Curse of St. Paul Island"	August 16, 2022	0.76
18	"Measure of the Man"	September 3, 2022	N/A
19	"New Blood, Primal Fears"	April 11, 2023	0.45
19	"Perfect Storm Survivor"	April 25, 2023	0.74
19	"Maiden Voyage"	July 4, 2023	N/A
20	"Deadliest Catch 20th Season Sneak Peek"	May 30, 2024	N/A
20	"The Twenty-Season Toll"	June 4, 2024	0.47
20	"Super El Niño"	August 27, 2024	0.63
21	"Curse of Adak Island"	August 1, 2025	0.56

== Mini-series and extended episodes ==
=== After the Catch ===
After the Catch is a mini-series that aired following or during the main Deadliest Catch seasons from 2007 to 2012. It primarily consists of roundtable discussions between the captains about their experiences as featured on the show, and after the season ended. After the Catch III-VI also include vignettes of the captains taking part in various activities where taping happened (like in the San Diego area during After the Catch III). After the Catch uses the same opening credits as Deadliest Catch except for the title and theme music.

Deadliest Catch narrator Mike Rowe hosted all episodes except After the Catch III, when Cash Cab's Ben Bailey hosted. After the Catch IV-VI began airing before the current season of Deadliest Catch was over, usually around the start of Opilio season.

==== After the Catch I (2007) ====
Filmed at the "Lockspot" bar in Seattle, Washington.

Theme music by Andy Kubiszewski.

No.	Title	Original release date
1	"Overboard"	May 29, 2007
2	"Man vs. Nature"	June 5, 2007
3	"Mysteries at Sea"	June 12, 2007
4	"On the Edge"	June 19, 2007

==== After the Catch II (2008) ====
Filmed at "Pratty's" pub in Gloucester, Massachusetts.

Theme music by Andy Kubiszewski.

No.	Title	Original release date
1	"Legends"	June 17, 2008
2	"Brothers"	June 24, 2008
3	"Emergency"	July 1, 2008
4	"Deckhands"	July 8, 2008
5	"Real Life"	July 15, 2008

==== After the Catch III (2009) ====
Cash Cab's Ben Bailey hosts this season. Filmed at "RT's Longboard Grill" and other locations in and near San Diego, California.

Theme music by Andy Kubiszewski.

No.	Title	Original release date
1	"Staying On Course"	June 16, 2009
2	"Bering Sea Brothers"	June 23, 2009
3	"Frozen Crab"	June 30, 2009
4	"No Trespassing"	July 7, 2009
5	"Life Is Good"	July 14, 2009

==== After the Catch IV (2010) ====
Mike Rowe returns as host; filmed at the "Blue Nile" bar and other locations in and near New Orleans, Louisiana.

Theme music: "Hard Row To Hoe", written and performed by Dege Legg.

No.	Title	Original release date
1	"The Time Bandit"	June 15, 2010
2	"The Northwestern"	June 22, 2010
3	"The Wizard"	June 29, 2010
4	"The Fleet"	July 6, 2010
5	"The Good Captain Phil"	July 13, 2010

==== After the Catch V (2011) ====
Hosted by Mike Rowe, and filmed at "The Shack" restaurant in Hawaii Kai and other locations on Oahu.

Theme music: "Hard Row To Hoe", written and performed by Dege Legg.

No.	Title	Original release date
1	"Low Tide"	June 14, 2011
2	"Relentless"	June 21, 2011
3	"Save Me"	June 28, 2011
4	"Fresh Blood"	July 5, 2011
5	"High Tide"	July 12, 2011

==== After the Catch VI (2012) ====
Hosted by Mike Rowe, and filmed at the "Whale's Tail" bar and other locations in and near Breckenridge, Colorado.

Theme music: "Hard Row To Hoe", written and performed by Dege Legg.

No.	Title	Original release date
1	"The Unexpected"	June 19, 2012
2	"Ambition"	June 26, 2012
3	"View From Shore"	July 3, 2012
4	"Gamblers"	July 10, 2012
5	"Fisherman's Code"	July 17, 2012
6	"Looking Ahead"	July 24, 2012

=== Inside the Catch (2012) ===
No.	Title	Original release date
1	"Inside the Catch: Deckhands"	April 10, 2012
2	"Inside the Catch: Best Brawls"	April 17, 2012
3	"Inside the Catch: Near Death"	April 24, 2012

=== The Bait ===
The Bait was a "pregame show" roundtable documentary-style television mini-series that previews select episodes of Deadliest Catch for seasons 9 and 10, filmed in Dutch Harbor, and hosted by Sig Hansen, Johnathan and Andy Hillstrand, and Keith Colburn, with narration by Deadliest Catch narrator Mike Rowe.

The captains swapped stories about the off-season and hinted on what the viewers could expect in that night's episode, with previews of the upcoming season in the king crab and opilio crab kickoffs.

Regular features included "The Hot Seat" (interview focused on one Captain or deckhand) and questions from celebrity fans of the show.

The spin-off series was produced in partnership with Original Productions and Silent Crow Arts.

Theme music was a six-second instrumental clip at the end of "Hard Row To Hoe" by Dege Legg (from After the Catch VI).

It was replaced by On Deck after season 10.

==== The Bait I (2013) ====
Episodes 4-7 were filmed at Mercer Island VFW near Seattle.

No.	Title	Original release date
1	"Opening Day: King Crab"	April 16, 2013
2	"Midseason Kings"	May 14, 2013
3	"Opilio Kicks Off"	June 4, 2013
4	"Fouled By Weather"	June 25, 2013
5	"Iced Over"	July 16, 2013
6	"Hail Mary"	July 23, 2013
7	"The Home Stretch"	July 30, 2013

==== The Bait II (2014) ====
The catch phrase for The Bait 2 is "You can't catch crab without The Bait."

Episode 6 filmed at Harlem Yacht Club in City Island, New York; Episodes 7-10 filmed at Mercer Island VFW near Seattle.

No.	Title	Original release date
1	"Season 10 Kickoff"	April 22, 2014
2	"Sacked!"	April 29, 2014
3	"Think Like a Captain"	May 13, 2014
4	"Out of Bounds"	May 27, 2014
5	"The Comeback Kid"	June 10, 2014
6	"Miracle on Ice"	June 17, 2014
7	"Hit the Showers"	July 1, 2014
8	"Unnecessary Roughness"	July 15, 2014
9	"The Red Zone"	July 29, 2014
10	"Touchdown"	August 5, 2014

=== On Deck ===
In the ninth season in 2013, Discovery continued the trend of expanded show notes and unaired scenes in its series with Deadliest Catch: On Deck. On Deck episode titles are the same as the Deadliest Catch episode they expand on.

Discovery made these episodes the primary lead-in program for the night's episode starting with season 11, replacing The Bait.

==== On Deck I (2013) ====
No.	Title	Original release date
1	"Mutiny on the Bering Sea"	April 23, 2013
Season 9, episode 1 expanded.
2	"Dagger in the Back"	April 30, 2013
Season 9, episode 2 expanded.
3	"Blood in the Morning"	May 6, 2013
Season 9, episode 3 expanded.
4	"Judgement Day"	May 21, 2013
Season 9, episode 5 expanded.
5	"Fist to the Face"	May 28, 2013
Season 9, episode 6 expanded.
6	"Kicking Off with a Bang"	June 11, 2013
Season 9, episode 8 expanded.
7	"The Storm of the Season"	June 18, 2013
Season 9, episode 9 expanded.
8	"We're Not Gonna Take It"	July 2, 2013
Season 9, episode 11 expanded.
9	"Listing Lovers"	July 16, 2013
Season 9, episode 12 expanded.

==== On Deck II (2014) ====
No.	Title	Original release date
1	"Family Affair"	May 6, 2014
Season 10, episode 2 expanded.
2	"Darwin's Law"	May 20, 2014
Season 10, episode 3 expanded.
3	"Against the Law"	May 20, 2014
Season 10, episode 4 expanded.
4	"On the Rocks"	May 27, 2014
Season 10, episode 5 expanded.
5	"Falling Down"	June 3, 2014
Season 10, episode 6 expanded.
6	"Lost at Sea"	June 10, 2014
Season 10, episode 7 expanded.
7	"Cornelia Marie Blue"	June 13, 2014
8	"Skipper Harris in Training"	June 20, 2014
Season 10, episode 9 expanded.
9	"Fisherman's Daughter"	June 27, 2014
Season 10, episode 10 expanded.
10	"Women Drivers"	July 11, 2014
Season 10, episode 12 expanded.
11	"Greatest Game Ever Fished"	July 18, 2014
Season 10, episode 13 expanded.
12	"Breaking Mandy"	July 25, 2014
Season 10, episode 14 expanded.
13	"Sabotage"	August 1, 2014
Season 10, episode 15 expanded.
14	"You'll Know My Name Is the Lord..."	August 8, 2014
Season 10, episode 16 expanded. (2-hour episode)

=== Decked (2014) ===
Decked is a rebroadcast episode of Deadliest Catch featuring webcam CatchChat with one or more Captains between episode segments.

No.	Title	Original release date
1	"Skipper Harris in Training"	June 24, 2014
Season 10, episode 9; CatchChat with Johnathan, Josh, Sig and Mandy.
2	"Blonde Ambition"	July 8, 2014
Season 10, episode 11.
3	"Greatest Game Ever Fished"	July 22, 2014
Season 10, episode 13.

=== Captain's Choice (2015) ===
No.	Title	Original release date
1	"Sig Hansen"	April 11, 2015
2	"John and Andy Hillstrand"	April 11, 2015
3	"Josh Harris"	April 11, 2015
4	"Keith Colburn"	April 11, 2015
5	"Wild Bill and Zack"	April 11, 2015
6	"Josh Harris"	April 11, 2015
7	"Keith Colburn"	April 11, 2015
8	"Sig Hansen"	April 11, 2015
9	"Josh and Jake Harris"	April 11, 2015
10	"Sig Hansen and Jake Anderson"	April 11, 2015
11	"All Captains"	April 11, 2015
12	"John and Andy Hillstrand"	April 11, 2015
13	"All Captains"	April 11, 2015

== Spin-offs ==
=== Deadliest Catch: Dungeon Cove ===
A spinoff titled Deadliest Catch: Dungeon Cove premiered on September 12, 2016. The series focused on a handful of boat captains and crews fishing for Dungeness crab off the Oregon Coast. The first season consists of eight episodes with the season finale airing on October 18, 2016. Discovery has not made any formal announcement on whether or not the show has been cancelled.

=== Deadliest Catch: Bloodline ===
A spinoff titled Deadliest Catch: Bloodline premiered on April 14, 2020. The series focuses on Josh Harris and Casey McManus exploring the notes Phil Harris left behind on a fishing chart of the Hawaiian Islands and learning to catch Ahi tuna.

=== Deadliest Catch: The Viking Returns ===
A spinoff titled Deadliest Catch: The Viking Returns premiered on September 13, 2022. The series focuses on Sig Hansen and his daughter, Mandy, as they try their hand at fishing off the coast of Norway after the Alaskan red king crab fishery is shut down. Sig brings along son-in-law Clark Pederson, one of his crew members from the F/V Northwestern, to join him and Mandy. In order to catch over $1 million in Norwegian red king crab quota, the Hansen family return to the M/S Stålbas to catch it. Mandy, in order to lure Saga captain and co-owner Jake Anderson, into going fishing with them, offers him a 10% ownership stake into the business, taken from her own percentage.

== See also ==
- List of awards and nominations received by Deadliest Catch
