= List of awards and nominations received by Deadliest Catch =

Awards and nominations received by Deadliest Catch
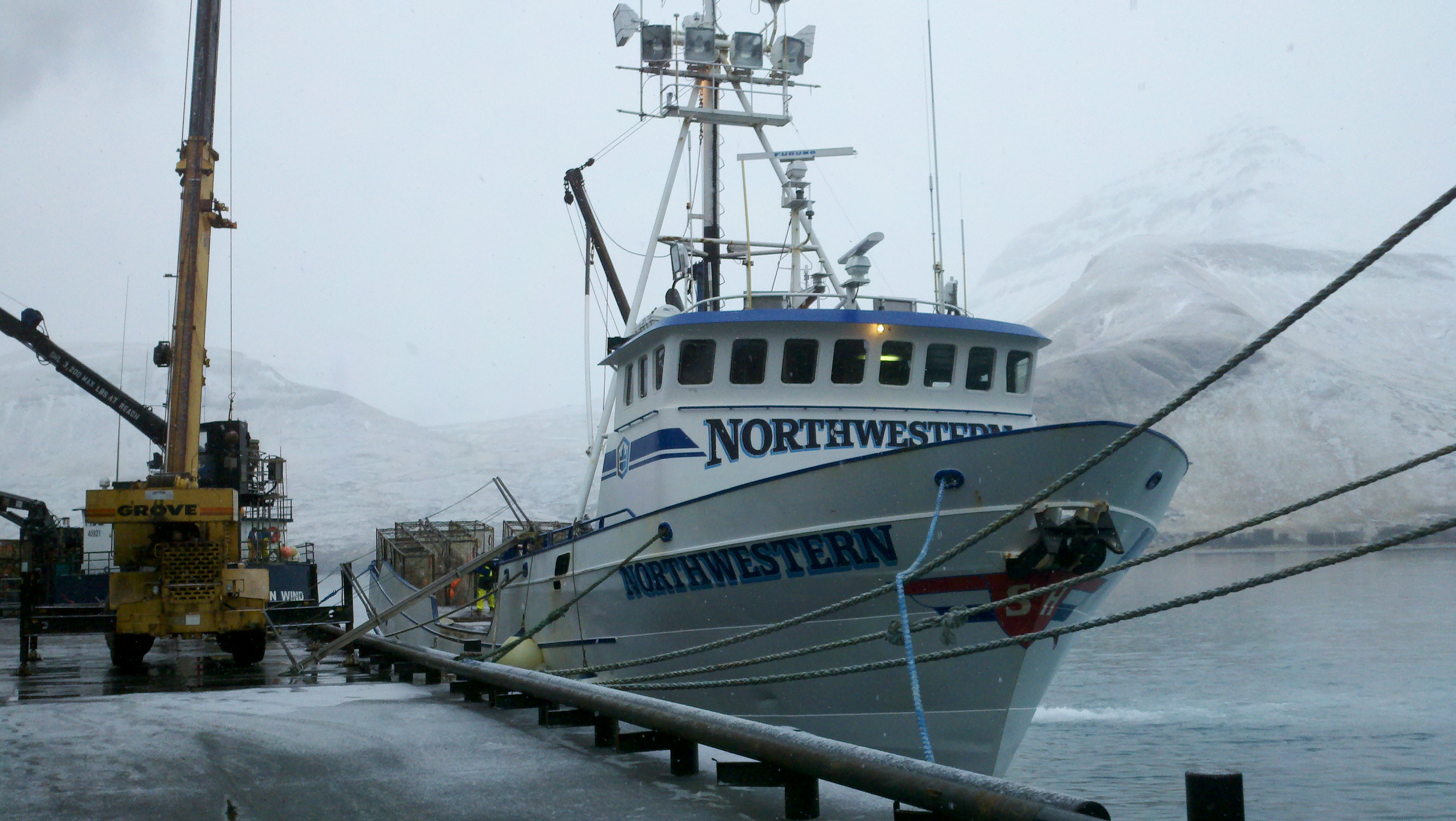
- F/V Northwestern docked in Akutan, Alaska.
Awards and nominations
Award	Wins	Nominations
ACE Eddie Awards	1	11
ASCAP Film and Television Music Awards	1	3
ASTRA Awards	1	7
Banff World Media Festival Rockie Awards	0	3
BMI Film & Television Awards	3	3
CAS Awards	4	14
Critics' Choice Real TV Awards	0	1
Critics' Choice Television Awards	0	3
Gold Derby Television Awards	0	1
IDA Awards	0	1
MPSE Golden Reel Awards	1	3
PCA Emmy Awards	16	51
PGA Awards	1	6

Totals (Note: Certain award groups do not simply award one winner. They acknowledge several different recipients, have runners-up, and have third place. Since this is a specific recognition and is different from losing an award, runner-up mentions are considered wins in this award tally. For simplification and to avoid errors, each award in this list has been presumed to have had a prior nomination.)
- Wins: 28
- Nominations: 107

The documentary and reality television series Deadliest Catch showcases the lives and tribulations of the men and women who work aboard crabbing and fishing vessels in the Bering Sea. As Original Productions produces the show, more than 30,000 hours of footage are captured by various boats and edited into between 10 and 21 episodes per season. Since its debut on the Discovery Channel in 2005, the show has amassed an extensive list of award nominations and wins. To date, the only fishing vessel that has appeared in all 15 seasons is the F/V Northwestern, captained by Sig and Edgar Hansen. The ship, its captains, and workers have also been featured in the pilot episode, spin-off mini-series, and several specials.

As of season 16, Deadliest Catch has received 52 Primetime Creative Arts (PCA) Emmy Award nominations, 16 of which have resulted in wins. Other award ceremonies at which the show has received nominations include the American Cinema Editors (ACE) Awards, Broadcast Music, Inc. (BMI) Film & Television Awards, Critics' Choice Television Awards, and Producers Guild of America (PGA) Awards. Deadliest Catch has also received award nominations from international ceremonies, such as the Australian Subscription Television and Radio Association (ASTRA) Awards.

For his work as sound mixer on Deadliest Catch, Bob Bronow received 33 nominations, 9 of which have resulted in wins. Series producer Thom Beers has received six nominations, one win. Bruce Hanifan has collected three wins as Deadliest Catch's composer, music producer, and sound designer.

== Awards and nominations ==
Award	Year (Note: Indicates the year of ceremony. Each year is linked to the article about the awards held that year, wherever possible.)	Category	Nominee(s) / Work	Result	Ref(s)
American Cinema Editors (ACE) Eddie Awards	2009	Best Edited Reality Series	Kelly Coskran & Ed Greene (for "Fresh Blood")	Nominated	
American Cinema Editors (ACE) Eddie Awards	2010	Best Edited Reality Series	Kelly Coskran & Josh Earl (for "Stay Focused or Die")	Won	
American Cinema Editors (ACE) Eddie Awards	2011	Best Edited Reality Series	Kelly Coskran & Josh Earl (for "Redemption Day")	Nominated	
American Cinema Editors (ACE) Eddie Awards	2013	Best Edited Non-Scripted Series	Josh Earl & Alex Durham (for "I Don't Want to Die")	Nominated	
American Cinema Editors (ACE) Eddie Awards	2014	Best Edited Non-Scripted Series	Josh Earl, Alex Durham; Rob Butler (for "Mutiny on the Bering Sea")	Nominated	
American Cinema Editors (ACE) Eddie Awards	2015	Best Edited Non-Scripted Series	Josh Earl & Johnny Bishop (for "Lost at Sea")	Nominated	
American Cinema Editors (ACE) Eddie Awards	2016	Best Edited Non-Scripted Series	Josh Earl & Ben Bulatao (for "Zero Hour")	Nominated	
American Cinema Editors (ACE) Eddie Awards	2017	Best Edited Non-Scripted Series	Josh Earl & Alexander Rubinow (for "Fire at Sea: Part 2")	Nominated	
American Cinema Editors (ACE) Eddie Awards	2018	Best Edited Non-Scripted Series	Ben Bulatao & Rob Butler, ACE (for "Lost at Sea")	Nominated	
American Cinema Editors (ACE) Eddie Awards	2019	Best Edited Non-Scripted Series	Ben Bulatao, Rob Butler, Greg Cornejo; Alexandra Moore; Ian Olsen (for "Storm Surge")	Nominated	
American Cinema Editors (ACE) Eddie Awards	2020	Best Edited Non-Scripted Series	Ben Bulatao, Rob Butler, Isaiah Camp; Greg Cornejo; Joe Mikan (for "Triple Jeopardy")	Nominated	
American Cinema Editors (ACE) Eddie Awards	2021	Best Edited Non-Scripted Series	Rob Butler, Isaiah Camp, Joe Mikan, Art O’Leary; Ian Olsen; Josh Stockero (for "Mayday Mayday")	Nominated	
American Society of Composers, Authors and Publishers (ASCAP) Film and Television Music Awards	2009	Top Television Series	Paul Hepker	Won	
American Society of Composers, Authors and Publishers (ASCAP) Film and Television Music Awards	2017	TV Composer of the Year	Didier Lean Rachou	Nominated	
American Society of Composers, Authors and Publishers (ASCAP) Film and Television Music Awards	2019	TV Composer of the Year	Didier Lean Rachou	Nominated	
Australian Subscription Television and Radio Association (ASTRA) Awards	2006	Most Outstanding International Program (Non Drama)	Deadliest Catch	Won	
Australian Subscription Television and Radio Association (ASTRA) Awards	2008	Favourite International Program	Deadliest Catch	Nominated	
Australian Subscription Television and Radio Association (ASTRA) Awards	2010	Favourite Program	Deadliest Catch	Nominated	
Australian Subscription Television and Radio Association (ASTRA) Awards	2011	Favourite Program – International	Deadliest Catch	Nominated	
Australian Subscription Television and Radio Association (ASTRA) Awards	2012	Favourite Program – International	Deadliest Catch	Nominated	
Australian Subscription Television and Radio Association (ASTRA) Awards	2014	Favourite Program – International	Deadliest Catch	Nominated	
Australian Subscription Television and Radio Association (ASTRA) Awards	2015	Most Outstanding Reality Program	Deadliest Catch	Nominated	
Banff World Media Festival Rockie Awards	2015	Reality	Deadliest Catch	Nominated	
Banff World Media Festival Rockie Awards	2016	Reality	Deadliest Catch	Nominated	
Banff World Media Festival Rockie Awards	2017	Reality	Deadliest Catch	Nominated	
Broadcast Music, Inc. (BMI) Film & Television Awards	2007	BMI Cable Awards	Bruce Hanifan	Won	
Broadcast Music, Inc. (BMI) Film & Television Awards	2008	BMI Cable Awards	Bruce Hanifan	Won	
Broadcast Music, Inc. (BMI) Film & Television Awards	2011	BMI Cable Awards	Bruce Hanifan	Won	
Cinema Audio Society (CAS) Awards	2007	Outstanding Achievement in Sound Mixing for Television - Non-Fiction, Variety or Music - Series or Specials	Bob Bronow (for "Cashing In")	Nominated	
Cinema Audio Society (CAS) Awards	2008	Outstanding Achievement in Sound Mixing for Television - Non-Fiction, Variety or Music - Series or Specials	Bob Bronow (for "The Unforgiving Sea")	Nominated	
Cinema Audio Society (CAS) Awards	2009	Outstanding Achievement in Sound Mixing for Television - Non-Fiction, Variety or Music - Series or Specials	Bob Bronow (for "No Mercy")	Won	
Cinema Audio Society (CAS) Awards	2010	Outstanding Achievement in Sound Mixing for Television - Non-Fiction, Variety or Music - Series or Specials	Bob Bronow (for "Stay Focused or Die")	Won	
Cinema Audio Society (CAS) Awards	2011	Outstanding Achievement in Sound Mixing for Television - Non-Fiction, Variety or Music - Series or Specials	Bob Bronow (for "Redemption Day")	Won	
Cinema Audio Society (CAS) Awards	2012	Outstanding Achievement in Sound Mixing for Television - Non-Fiction, Variety or Music - Series or Specials	Bob Bronow (for "New Blood")	Won	
Cinema Audio Society (CAS) Awards	2013	Outstanding Achievement in Sound Mixing for Television - Non-Fiction, Variety or Music - Series or Specials	Bob Bronow (for "I Don't Wanna Die")	Nominated	
Cinema Audio Society (CAS) Awards	2014	Outstanding Achievement in Sound Mixing for Television - Non-Fiction, Variety or Music - Series or Specials	Bob Bronow (for "The Final Battle")	Nominated	
Cinema Audio Society (CAS) Awards	2015	Outstanding Achievement in Sound Mixing for Television - Non-Fiction, Variety or Music - Series or Specials	Bob Bronow (for "Lost at Sea")	Nominated	
Cinema Audio Society (CAS) Awards	2016	Outstanding Achievement in Sound Mixing for Television - Non-Fiction, Variety or Music - Series or Specials	Bob Bronow (for "Lunatic Fringe")	Nominated	
Cinema Audio Society (CAS) Awards	2017	Outstanding Achievement in Sound Mixing for Television - Non-Fiction, Variety or Music - Series or Specials	Bob Bronow (for "The Widowmaker (Part 1)")	Nominated	
Cinema Audio Society (CAS) Awards	2018	Outstanding Achievement in Sound Mixing for Television - Non-Fiction, Variety or Music - Series or Specials	John Warrin (for "Last Damn Arctic Storm")	Nominated	
Cinema Audio Society (CAS) Awards	2019	Outstanding Achievement in Sound Mixing for Television - Non-Fiction, Variety or Music - Series or Specials	'Bob Bronow (for "Blood and Water")	Nominated	
Cinema Audio Society (CAS) Awards	2020	Outstanding Achievement in Sound Mixing for Television - Non-Fiction, Variety or Music - Series or Specials	Bob Bronow (for "Sixty Foot Monster")	Nominated	
Critics' Choice Real TV Awards	2019	Unstructured Series	Deadliest Catch	Nominated	
Critics' Choice Television Awards	2014	Best Reality Series	Deadliest Catch	Nominated	
Critics' Choice Television Awards	2015	Best Reality Series	Deadliest Catch	Nominated	
Critics' Choice Television Awards	2016	Best Unstructured Reality Show	Deadliest Catch	Nominated	
Gold Derby Television Awards	2011	Reality Program	Deadliest Catch	Nominated	
International Documentary Association (IDA) Awards	2005	Best Continuing Series	Deadliest Catch	Nominated	
Motion Picture Sound Editors (MPSE) Golden Reel Awards	2014	Best Sound Editing: Long Form Documentary in Television	Bob Bronow, Kevin Skaggs, Jason Tuttle (for "The Final Battle")	Won	
Motion Picture Sound Editors (MPSE) Golden Reel Awards	2015	TV Documentary Long Form – Effects/Foley/Dialogue/ADR	Bob Bronow, Doug Kern, Eddie Rodriguez, Selina Zakaria (for "You'll Know My Name is the Lord")	Nominated	
Motion Picture Sound Editors (MPSE) Golden Reel Awards	2016	Best Sound Editing: Short Form Documentary in Television	Bob Bronow, Noelle DiMarco, Laurence A. Ellis (for "5-Year Storm Part 2")	Nominated	
Primetime Creative Arts Emmy Awards	2006	Outstanding Nonfiction Series	David McKillop, Thom Beers, Tracy Green, Jeff Conroy, Nathanial Havholm, Doug Stanley, Todd Stanley, Patrick Costello, Monica Martino, Chris Nee, Johnny Petillo, Ethan Prochnik, Brian Lovett and Larry Law	Nominated	
Primetime Creative Arts Emmy Awards	2006	Outstanding Cinematography for a Reality Program	Doug Stanley, Marc Carter, Patrick Cummings, Zac McFarlane, Bryan Miller, Scott Simper (for "The Clock's Ticking")	Nominated	
Primetime Creative Arts Emmy Awards	2006	Outstanding Sound Mixing for a Nonfiction or Reality Program (Single or Multi-Camera)	Bob Bronow (for "The Clock's Ticking")	Nominated	
Primetime Creative Arts Emmy Awards	2007	Outstanding Nonfiction Series	Thom Beers, Paul Gasek, Jeff Conroy, Lisa Tanzer, Ethan Prochnik, Tim Pastore, Matt Renner, Kyle Wheeler, Christian Skovly, Todd Stanley, Cameron Glendenning, Zac McFarlane, Doug Stanley and Kelly Coskran,	Nominated	
Primetime Creative Arts Emmy Awards	2007	Outstanding Cinematography for a Nonfiction Programming	Doug Stanley, Zac McFarlane, Don Bland, Cameron Glendenning, Todd Stanley and Eric Lange (for "The Unforgiving Sea")	Nominated	
Primetime Creative Arts Emmy Awards	2007	Outstanding Picture Editing for a Nonfiction Program	Kelly Coskran and Ed Greene (for "The Unforgiving Sea")	Nominated	
Primetime Creative Arts Emmy Awards	2007	Outstanding Sound Mixing for a Nonfiction or Reality Program (Single or Multi-Camera)	Bob Bronow (for "The Unforgiving Sea")	Nominated	
Primetime Creative Arts Emmy Awards	2008	Outstanding Nonfiction Series	Thom Beer, Paul Gasek, Jeff Conroy, Tracy Rudolph, Matt Renner, Lisa Tanzer, Ethan Prochnik	Nominated	
Primetime Creative Arts Emmy Awards	2008	Outstanding Cinematography for a Nonfiction Programming	Cinematography Team (for "No Mercy")	Won	
Primetime Creative Arts Emmy Awards	2008	Outstanding Picture Editing for a Nonfiction Program	Kelly Coskran and Rob Butler (for "No Mercy")	Nominated	
Primetime Creative Arts Emmy Awards	2008	Outstanding Sound Mixing for a Nonfiction or Reality Program (Single or Multi-Camera)	Bob Bronow (for "No Mercy")	Nominated	
Primetime Creative Arts Emmy Awards	2009	Outstanding Nonfiction Series	Thom Beers, Jeff Conroy, Paul Gasek, Tracy Rudolph, Matt Renner, Ethan Prochnik	Nominated	
Primetime Creative Arts Emmy Awards	2009	Outstanding Cinematography for a Nonfiction Programming	Cinematography Team (for "Stay Focused or Die")	Nominated	
Primetime Creative Arts Emmy Awards	2009	Outstanding Picture Editing for a Nonfiction Program	Kelly Coskran and Josh Earl (for "Stay Focused or Die")	Nominated	
Primetime Creative Arts Emmy Awards	2009	Outstanding Sound Mixing for a Nonfiction or Reality Program (Single or Multi-Camera)	Bob Bronow (for "Stay Focused or Die")	Nominated	
Primetime Creative Arts Emmy Awards	2010	Outstanding Nonfiction Series	Thom Beers, Jeff Conroy, Paul Gasek, Tracy Rudolph, Matt Renner, Ethan Prochnik, Eric Lange	Nominated	
Primetime Creative Arts Emmy Awards	2010	Outstanding Cinematography for a Nonfiction Programming	Cinematography Team (for "No Second Chances")	Nominated	
Primetime Creative Arts Emmy Awards	2010	Outstanding Picture Editing for a Nonfiction Program	Kelly Coskran and Josh Earl (for "No Second Chances")	Nominated	
Primetime Creative Arts Emmy Awards	2010	Outstanding Sound Mixing for a Nonfiction or Reality Program (Single or Multi-Camera)	Bob Bronow (for "No Second Chances")	Won	
Primetime Creative Arts Emmy Awards	2011	Outstanding Reality Program	Thom Beers, Jeff Conroy, Paul Gasek, Tracy Rudolph, Matt Renner, Sheila McCormack, Ethan Prochnik, Steven Robillard, Todd Stanley	Won	
Primetime Creative Arts Emmy Awards	2011	Outstanding Cinematography for a Reality Program	Cinematography Team (for "Redemption Day")	Won	
Primetime Creative Arts Emmy Awards	2011	Outstanding Picture Editing for a Structured Reality or Competition Program	Josh Earl, Kelly Coskran, Alex Durham (for "Redemption Day")	Won	
Primetime Creative Arts Emmy Awards	2011	Outstanding Sound Mixing for a Nonfiction or Reality Program (Single or Multi-Camera)	Bob Bronow (for "Redemption Day")	Won	
Primetime Creative Arts Emmy Awards	2012	Outstanding Cinematography for a Reality Program	Cinematography Team (for "I Don't Wanna Die")	Won	
Primetime Creative Arts Emmy Awards	2012	Outstanding Picture Editing for a Structured Reality or Competition Program	Josh Earl, Alex Durham (for "I Don't Wanna Die")	Won	
Primetime Creative Arts Emmy Awards	2012	Outstanding Sound Mixing for a Nonfiction or Reality Program (Single or Multi-Camera)	Bob Bronow (for "I Don't Wanna Die")	Nominated	
Primetime Creative Arts Emmy Awards	2013	Outstanding Reality Program	Thom Beers, Jeff Conroy, David Pritikin, John Gray, Sheila McCormack, Decker Watson and Sean Dash	Nominated	
Primetime Creative Arts Emmy Awards	2013	Outstanding Cinematography for a Reality Program	Cinematography Team (for "Mutiny On The Bering Sea")	Won	
Primetime Creative Arts Emmy Awards	2013	Outstanding Picture Editing for a Structured Reality or Competition Program	Josh Earl, Alex Durham, Rob Butler (for "Mutiny On The Bering Sea")	Won	
Primetime Creative Arts Emmy Awards	2013	Outstanding Sound Mixing for a Nonfiction or Reality Program (Single or Multi-Camera)	Bob Bronow (for "Mutiny On The Bering Sea")	Nominated	
Primetime Creative Arts Emmy Awards	2014	Outstanding Unstructured Reality Program	Thom Beers, Jeff Conroy, John Gray, David Pritikin, Decker Watson, Johnny Beechler and Geoff Miller	Won	
Primetime Creative Arts Emmy Awards	2014	Outstanding Cinematography for a Reality Program	Cinematography Team (for "Careful What You Wish For")	Won	
Primetime Creative Arts Emmy Awards	2014	Outstanding Picture Editing for a Structured Reality or Competition Program	Josh Earl, Rob Butler, Art O'Leary (for "Careful What You Wish For")	Won	
Primetime Creative Arts Emmy Awards	2014	Outstanding Sound Mixing for a Nonfiction or Reality Program (Single or Multi-Camera)	Bob Bronow (for "Careful What You Wish For")	Nominated	
Primetime Creative Arts Emmy Awards	2015	Outstanding Unstructured Reality Program	Thom Beers, Jeff Conroy, John Gray, David Pritikin, Joseph Boyle, Decker Watson, Johnny Beechler and Geoff Miller	Won	
Primetime Creative Arts Emmy Awards	2015	Outstanding Cinematography for a Reality Program	David Reichert, Todd Stanley, Steven Wright, Breck Warwick, Matt Fahey (for "A Brotherhood Tested")	Won	
Primetime Creative Arts Emmy Awards	2015	Outstanding Picture Editing for a Structured Reality or Competition Program	Josh Earl, Alexander B. Rubinow, Alex Durham (for "A Brotherhood Tested")	Won	
Primetime Creative Arts Emmy Awards	2015	Outstanding Sound Mixing for a Nonfiction or Reality Program (Single or Multi-Camera)	Bob Bronow (for "Lost at Sea")	Nominated	
Primetime Creative Arts Emmy Awards	2016	Outstanding Unstructured Reality Program	Thom Beers, Jeff Conroy, John Gray, Philip David Segal, Sarah Whalen, Joseph Boyle, Decker Watson, Geoff Miller, Arom Starr-Paul and Josh Earl	Nominated	
Primetime Creative Arts Emmy Awards	2016	Outstanding Cinematography for A Reality Program	David Reichert, Todd Stanley, Steve Wright, Josh Thomas, Shane Moore (for "Carpe Diem")	Nominated	
Primetime Creative Arts Emmy Awards	2016	Outstanding Picture Editing for an Unstructured Reality Program	Josh Earl, Ben Bulatao (for "Carpe Diem")	Nominated	
Primetime Creative Arts Emmy Awards	2016	Outstanding Sound Mixing for a Nonfiction or Reality Program (Single or Multi-Camera)	Bob Bronow (for "Carpe Diem")	Nominated	
Primetime Creative Arts Emmy Awards	2017	Outstanding Unstructured Reality Program	Thom Beers, Philip David Segal, Sarah Whalen, Joseph Boyle, Decker Watson, Geoff Miller, Arom Starr-Paul and Josh Earl	Nominated	
Primetime Creative Arts Emmy Awards	2017	Outstanding Cinematography for a Reality Program	David Reichert, Dave Arnold, Kelvon Agee, Todd Stanley, Josh Thomas (for "Uncharted Territory")	Nominated	
Primetime Creative Arts Emmy Awards	2017	Outstanding Picture Editing for an Unstructured Reality Program	Josh Earl, Rob Butler, Nathen Araiza, Ben Bulatao (for "Uncharted Territory")	Nominated	
Primetime Creative Arts Emmy Awards	2018	Outstanding Unstructured Reality Program	Thom Beers, Philip David Segal, Sarah Whalen, Joseph Boyle, Decker Watson, Arom Starr-Paul, Ernie Avila, Geoff Miller	Nominated	
Primetime Creative Arts Emmy Awards	2018	Outstanding Cinematography for a Reality Program	David Reichert, Charlie Beck, Kelvon Agee, Ben Staley, Josh Thomas (for "Battle Lines")	Nominated	
Primetime Creative Arts Emmy Awards	2018	Outstanding Picture Editing for an Unstructured Reality Program	Rob Butler, Alexandra Moore, Ben Bulatao, Josh Earl, Greg Cornejo (for "Battle Lines")	Nominated	
Primetime Creative Arts Emmy Awards	2019	Outstanding Unstructured Reality Program	Jeff Hasler, Brian Lovett, Ernest Avila, R. Decker Watson Jr., Arom Starr-Paul, Thom Beers, Joseph Boyle, Bill Howard, Geoff Miller, Rob Butler, Will Gatlin, Adam Flacks	Nominated	
Primetime Creative Arts Emmy Awards	2019	Outstanding Cinematography for a Reality Program	Cinematography Team	Nominated	
Primetime Creative Arts Emmy Awards	2019	Outstanding Picture Editing for an Unstructured Reality Program	Rob Butler, Isaiah Camp, Nathen Araiza, Ben Bulatao and Greg Cornejo (for "Battle of Kings")	Nominated	
Primetime Creative Arts Emmy Awards	2020	Outstanding Picture Editing for an Unstructured Reality Program	Rob Butler, Isaiah Camp, Ben Bulatao, Joe Mikan, Ralf Melville and Alexandra Moore (for "Cold War Rivals")	Nominated	
Primetime Creative Arts Emmy Awards	2021	Outstanding Picture Editing for an Unstructured Reality Program	Rob Butler, Isaiah Camp, Joe Mikan, Art O'Leary, Alexander Rubinow, Ben Bulatao, Alexandra Moore, Nico Natale, Alberto Perez and Chris Courtner	Nominated	
Primetime Creative Arts Emmy Awards	2021	Outstanding Cinematography for a Reality Program	David Reichert, Jacob Tawney, Shane Moore, Dave Arnold, Nathan Garofalos, Todd Stanley, Bryan Miller, Kelvon Agee, Carson Doyle, Scott Messier, Charlie Beck, Josh Thomas, Tom Trainor, Nate Chambers and Randy Lee	Nominated	
Producers Guild of America (PGA) Awards	2008	Producer of the Year in Live Non-Fiction Television	Thom Beers, Jeff Conroy, Lisa Tanzer	Nominated	
Producers Guild of America (PGA) Awards	2009	Producer of the Year in Live Non-Fiction Television	Thom Beers, Jeff Conroy, Ethan Prochnik, Lisa Tanzer	Nominated	
Producers Guild of America (PGA) Awards	2010	Producer of the Year in Non-Fiction Television	Thom Beers, Jeff Conroy, Ethan Prochnik, Matt Renner	Nominated	
Producers Guild of America (PGA) Awards	2011	Outstanding Producer of Non-Fiction Television	Thom Beers, Jeff Conroy, Sheila McCormack, Ethan Prochnik, Matt Renner	Won	
Producers Guild of America (PGA) Awards	2012	Outstanding Producer of Non-Fiction Television	Thom Beers, Jeff Conroy, John Gray, Sheila McCormack, Ethan Prochnik, Bill Pruitt, Matt Renner	Nominated	
Producers Guild of America (PGA) Awards	2013	Outstanding Producer of Non-Fiction Television	Thom Beers, Jeff Conroy, Sean Dash, John Gray, Sheila McCormack, Bill Pruitt, Decker Watson	Nominated	

== See also ==
- List of Deadliest Catch episodes
