= CAPE-1 =

American student cubesat

- Mission type: Technology
- Operator: University of Louisiana at Lafayette
- COSPAR ID: 2007-012P
- SATCAT no.: 31130
- Mission duration: 18 years, 8 months and 16 days (in progress)

Spacecraft properties
- Spacecraft type: 1U CubeSat
- Launch mass: 0.879 kg (1.94 lb)

Start of mission
- Launch date: 17 April 2007, 06:46 UTC
- Rocket: Dnepr
- Launch site: Baikonur 109/95
- Contractor: ISC Kosmotras

Orbital parameters
- Reference system: Geocentric
- Regime: Low Earth
- Eccentricity: 0,01036
- Perigee altitude: 646 km (401 mi)
- Apogee altitude: 793 km (493 mi)
- Inclination: 98.1°
- Period: 99.2 minutes
- Epoch: 17 April 2007

CAPE-1 (Cajun Advanced Picosatellite Experiment) is an amateur miniaturized satellite developed by students at the University of Louisiana at Lafayette. The CubeSat was launched successfully into orbit at the Baikonur Cosmodrome in Kazakhstan in April 2007 after a delay of several weeks.

An amateur radio frequency in the 70-centimeter band was used during the satellite's operation. Intermittent continuous wave and AX.25 telemetry beacons were sent at one watt with the call sign K5USL. CAPE-1 has ceased operation, and is succeeded by the CAPE-2 picosatellite, a 1U Cubesat operating on the 2-meter and 70-centimeter bands.

== See also ==
- List of CubeSats
- CAPE-2
