= Brother Dege =

American musician (1967–2024)

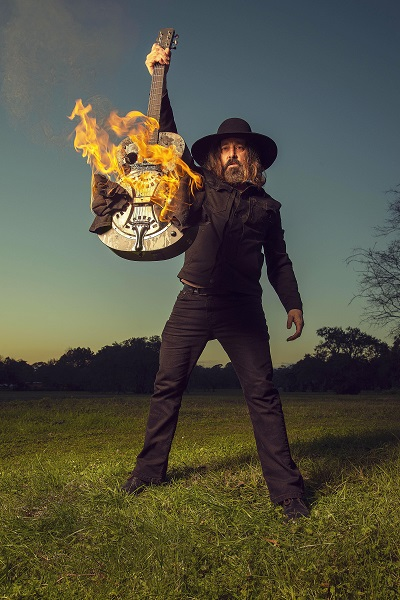
- Born: David John Legg; June 8, 1967; Lafayette, Louisiana
- Died: March 8, 2024 (aged 56); Lafayette, Louisiana
- Other name: Dege Legg
- Occupations: Singer; songwriter; musician
- Years active: 1994–2024
- Musical career
- Genres: Alternative country; swamp rock; Americana; Delta blues
- Instruments: Vocals, guitar
- Labels: GolarWash Labs & Records; Magic Bullet Records; Psyouthern Records; Prophecy Productions & Records
- Website: brotherdege.net

David John Legg (8 June 1967 – 8 March 2024), known professionally as Brother Dege and Dege Legg, was a United States singer, songwriter, and musician of country, rock and blues.

== Early life ==
From Cajun-French and Irish ancestry, Legg was born and raised in southern Louisiana. His parents were Anne and John Legg, lieutenant colonel from the United States Air Force. They moved a lot and lived in Northern California and Georgia. His parents broke up so he and his mother came back to Louisiana.

He had a Bachelor of Arts in philosophy from Louisiana State University. He also discovered Henry Miller, Charles Bukowski, Gabriel García Márquez and Beat Generation's writers.

He listened to 1970s and 1980s rock music : Led Zeppelin, Black Sabbath, Jimi Hendrix, AC/DC, plus the blues of Blind Willie Johnson, Son House, Robert Johnson, Bukka White, plus lyrics of Tom Waits and Bob Dylan. He taught himself how to play guitar and wrote his first songs.

Legg suffered from chronic depression and drug dependence. After a suicide attempt in the Mississippi from a bridge he decided to go to drug rehabilitation.

== Career ==
=== An underground artist (1994–2012) ===
In 1994, Legg with his initials DJ chose "Dege Legg" as his professional name. He formed the band Santeria as a singer with other musicians : Primo (guitare), Krishna Kasturi (drum), Chad Willis (bass) and Rob Rushing (percussion). During ten years the band self-released on his own label four albums and became one of the southern underground band. The band dissolved in 2008.

To support his artistic projects, Legg worked many odd jobs: cabdriver, machinist, caseworker in a homeless shelter, delivery driver, dishwasher, tire mechanic, cook, journalist at The Independent and won the Louisiana Press Award in 2004 and 2008 for his article about Homelessness in Lafayette.

Legg varied the musical experiences by joining C. C. Adcock's touring band as second guitarist in The Lafayette Marquis and he formed the new band Black Bayou Construkt and released the album Kingdoms of Folly in 2009. After several solo albums he continued to play solo tour as "Brother Dege". During ten years he wrote the album Folk songs of the American Longhair and recorded in non-traditional spaces : elevator shafts, open fields, abandoned houses before recording the tracks at home. After that he worked with professionals to mix and master his albums. Brother Dedge described his music as psyouthern (psychedelic and southern) because in his country the energy was "dark and spooky". David Maine of PopMatters said the album was ranged "from quietly desperate to careening full-tilt boogie" with slide guitar, Southern gothic and rock and roll. For Walter Pierce of The Independent, Kingdoms of Folly was a "musical departure from the dark, Southern tribalism of Santeria". For KLOF Magazine "the album tunnels into the ancient mysteries of pre-war blues and its devil-obsessed masters". Brother Dege, called by the press "the best kept secrets in the Deep South" went in solo tour in America with a dobro and for the first time in Europe (Belgium and Netherland). The producers of American reality television series Deadliest Catch licensed the song "Hard Row to Hoe".

=== Worldwide recognition (2013–2024) ===
Quentin Tarantino heard at SiriusXM the song "Too Old to Die Young" and wanted it in his movie's score, Django Unchained. Tarantino said : "every track could have been in the movie". The movie was a great success. Tarantino won the Academy Award for Best Original Screenplay and the music was nominated for the Grammy Award for Best Compilation Soundtrack for Visual Media. About this participation Brother Dege declared : "I couldn’t ask for a better director to be interested in my music. [...] People associate Quentin with a bold cinematic aesthetic and his exquisite taste in music".

In 2013, Brother Dege released the new album How to Kill a Horse. To Robert Gluck of The Aquarian he was emerged into the spotlight with the same attention as The Black Keys and Gary Clark, Jr. In 2015 the album Scorched Earth Policy was atypical because he mixed new songs "haunting and catchy compositions" for OffBeat, old demos, covers (Black Sabbath, Hüsker Dü). To Blues Rock Review the album was full of surprises with "undertones of funky, psychedelic production techniques such as echoing background vocals and spacey, saturated drums". Brother Dege toured with his new band The Brethren founded in 2013.

In 2018, his concept album Farmer's Almanac was "trying to fight your way out of a small town in the South". To Peter Lindblad of Elmore Magazine "Farmer’s Almanac is a broken piece of scuffed luggage bulging with troubled narratives of angels, drifters, ghosts and oddballs trapped in a hole of small-town desperation". Brother Dege and his band toured in America and in Europe during nine weeks (France and Netherlands) and again in 2019. In 2022 after touring two months in Europe he toured again in America alone in acoustic concert for the first time since 2014.

Brother Dege was also a writer. He published a novel in 2006 The Battle Hymn of the Hillbilly Zatan Boys and co-signed with the architect Geoff Gjertson a book about solar home in 2014, Generating Hope: Stories of the Beausoleil Louisiana Solar Home. In 2020 he released with UL Press, Cablog: Diary of a Cabdriver and detailed the five years (2003–2008) he drove a taxicab in Lafayette. With the book Brother Dege released the instrumental album Only the Dust with 36 tracks.

In December 2023 the first single "Where the Black Flowers Grow" from his new album, Aurora, was out. To Brother Dege Aurora dealt "with love, psychosis, and the dysfunctions that get repeated within these relationships and patterns of myself. I thought of it as an ouroboros—which is a snake that eats its own tail. In a relationship, you are swallowing your own tail and tail of your partner, because you blame them for some of it too. The Aurora resembles the spectral light of falling in love." For the first time the musician was signed with a label : Prophecy Productions & Records. The album was released on 15 March 2024. After two dates in Austin he intended to tour in April 2024 in Europe.

== Death ==
Brother Dege committed suicide on 8 March 2024 in his native town of Lafayette at the age of 56 years old.Prophecy Productions & Records decided to release the album Aurora on 15 March 2024. In promotional materials Brother Dege said: "As dark as it gets, I'd like for people to know there's some kind of twisted light at the end of the tunnel that's worth reaching together. I don't know if it's an illusion, but even hope embedded in an illusion is better than no illusion or no hope at all".

== Legacy ==
A portrait of Brother Dege was painted on a wall in his native town of Lafayette.

On October 2026, a new album was announced held by the single Saddest song in the world. The album The Great Unknown will released on January 2027.

== Discography ==
=== Albums ===
- 1997 : Bastard's Blues
- 1999 : Love Letters & Suicide Notes, EP
- 2004 : Trailerville
- 2010 : Folk Songs of the American Longhair
- 2013 : How to Kill a Horse
- 2015 : Scorched Earth Policy
- 2018 : Farmer's Almanac
- 2021 : Only the Dust
- 2024 : Aurora
- 2027 : The Great Unknown

=== With Santeria ===
- 1998 : Santeria
- 2000 : Apocalypse, Louisiana, live
- 2002 : House of the Dying Sun
- 2008 : Year of the Knife

=== With Black Bayou Construkt ===
- 2009 : Kingdoms of Folly

== Bibliography ==
- The Battle Hymn of the Hillbilly Zatan Boys, 2006 (novel)
- Slipping Through the Cracks: A Week on the Streets with Lafayette's Homeless, The Independent Weekly, 13 June 2007, n° 196
- Into the Great Unknown : A Short History of Going Nowhere: Collected Santeria Journals 2000–2004, 2011
- Generating Hope: Stories of the Beausoleil Louisiana Solar Home, cowritten with Geoff Gjertson, UL Press, 2014
- Cablog: Diary of a Cabdriver, UL Press, 2020

== Awards ==
- Louisiana Press Award 2004, 2008 for Slipping Through the Cracks: A Week on the Streets with Lafayette's Homeless

=== Nomination ===
- Grammy Awards 2014 : Best Compilation Soundtrack for Visual Media for Django Unchained
