= Center for Louisiana Studies =

The Center for Louisiana Studies is the press of the University of Louisiana, with the mission to promote and facilitate scholarly research on any and all aspects of Louisiana studies. With over 100 titles currently in print, the Center is the largest publisher of exclusively Louisiana-related books in the world. It also serves as a research facility and archival repository.

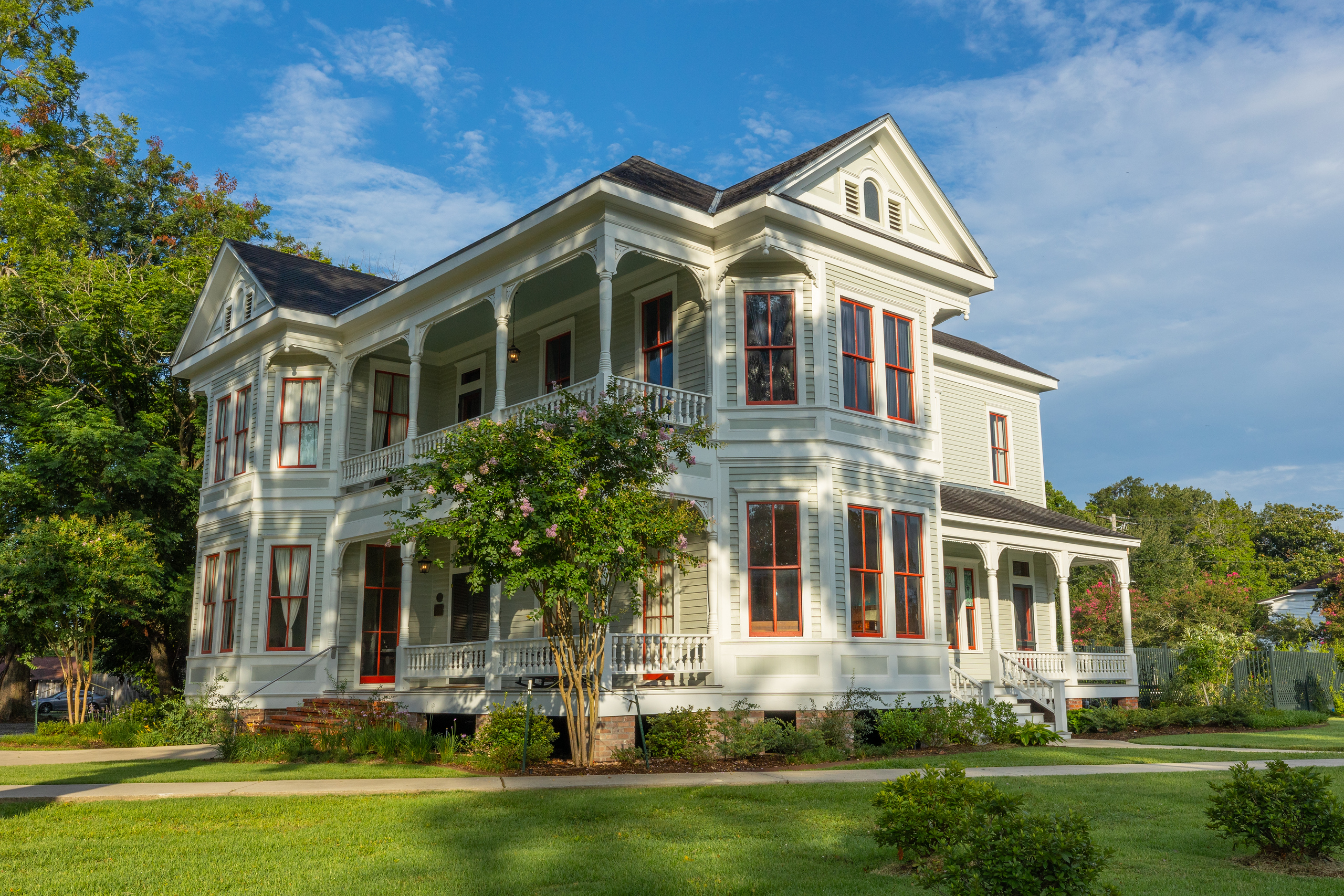
J. Arthur Roy House

== History ==
Founded in 1973, the Center for Louisiana Studies grew around the University's copies of the Louisiana Colonial Records Collection. Begun in 1967, the Collection attempts to draw together available microfilmed copies of any and all primary source records focused on the discovery, exploration, settlement, and development of the Mississippi Valley between 1682 and 1803. To date, over 1,000,000 pages of archival material have been photo-duplicated from French archives; over 1.5 million pages copied from Spanish archives; over 20,000 pages of documentary evidence from British depositories; and over 165,000 pages of material have been collected from various Louisiana sources. Together with the Library of Congress and the University of Memphis, the Center is one of only three repositories for the colonial documents of France in the United States.

Another important impetus for the founding of the Center was the creation of The University of Southwestern Louisiana History Series (U.S.L. being the former name of The University of Louisiana). Glenn Conrad, the director of the Center from 1973 to 2003, edited the U.S.L. History Series from its establishment in 1970 until the fifteenth and final title in 1985. This Series established the Center for Louisiana Studies as a significant regional publishing center.

The Center received a significant boost with the publication of The Courthouses of Louisiana and The Cajuns: Essays on their History and Culture. Although sales of these titles were modest by publishing standards, that small amount nevertheless allowed the Center to continuously expand the quality of its product

Other important series from the Center were the U.S.L. Architecture Series, which followed from the Courthouses of Louisiana (1978); the Louisiana Life Series, covering the rich cultures of South Louisiana, including such diverse topics as Cajun culture, jazz, the Acadian diaspora, New Orleans cemeteries, Voodoo, and others; and the Louisiana Purchase Bicentennial Series in Louisiana History, the most ambitious Louisiana-related publication project ever undertaken by any publisher. The Center has also published many titles on Louisiana genealogy and civil records.

The Center also comprises The Center for Cultural and Ecotourism, and is partnered with The Center for Acadian and Creole Folklore.

== UL Press ==
The Center for Louisiana Studies also operates the UL Press, a university press that is currently an introductory member of the Association of University Presses.
