= University of Louisiana at Lafayette =

Public university in Lafayette, Louisiana, US

- Former name: List: Southwestern Louisiana Industrial Institute (1898–1920) Southwestern Louisiana Institute of Liberal and Technical Learning (1921–1959) University of Southwestern Louisiana (1960–1998)
- Motto: Fortiter, Feliciter, Fideliter (Latin)
- Motto in English: "Boldly, Happily, Faithfully"
- Type: Public research university
- Established: July 14, 1898; 128 years ago
- Parent institution: University of Louisiana System
- Accreditation: SACS
- Academic affiliations: ORAU; space-grant
- Endowment: $241.6 million (2025)
- President: Ramesh Kolluru
- Faculty: 776
- Students: 15,702 (fall 2026)
- Undergraduates: 13,602 (fall 2026)
- Postgraduates: 2,100 (fall 2026)
- Location: Lafayette, Louisiana, United States; 30°12′44″N 92°01′12″W
- Campus: 145 acres (0.59 km^{2}) (city); 391 acres (1.58 km^{2}) (University Commons); 764 acres (3.09 km^{2}) (misc); 1,300 acres (5.3 km^{2}) (total); Midsize city
- Newspaper: The Vermilion
- Colors: Vermilion and white
- Nickname: Ragin' Cajuns
- Sporting affiliations: NCAA Division I FBS – Sun Belt
- Website: louisiana.edu

The University of Louisiana at Lafayette (UL Lafayette, University of Louisiana, ULL, or UL) is a public research university in Lafayette, Louisiana, United States. It has the largest enrollment within the eight-campus University of Louisiana System and the second-largest enrollment in Louisiana, behind only Louisiana State University. It is classified among "R1: Doctoral Universities – Very high research activity".

Founded in 1898 as an industrial school, the institution developed into a four-year university during the twentieth century and became known by its present name in 1999. It offers Louisiana's only Ph.D. in francophone studies, Louisiana's only master's of informatics, and Louisiana's only industrial design degree. The university has achieved several milestones in computer science, engineering and architecture. It is also home to a distinct College of the Arts.

== History ==
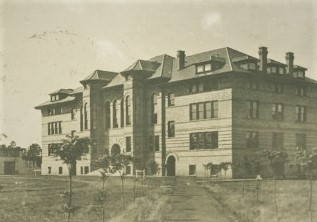
Southwestern Louisiana Industrial Institute

On July 14, 1898, the Southwestern Louisiana Industrial Institute (SLII) was created through state legislation: Louisiana General Assembly, Act 162, introduced by Robert Martin of St. Martin Parish. The new school needed to be located within Louisiana's 13th State Senate district.

A number of communities sought the school, including Jeanerette and St. Martinville, but only three submitted formal bids—Lafayette, New Iberia, and Scott. Lafayette Parish voters approved a parish-wide tax of two mills for 10 years if either Lafayette or Scott was selected; neither Iberia Parish nor St. Martin Parish was able to do the same, instead passing only city-wide taxes. Lafayette's offer—the tax proceeds, $18,000 in cash, and 25 acres of land just outside the city limits, donated by Crow and Maxim Girard—beat out New Iberia's 5–2 in a board vote on January 5, 1900.

The first university president was Edwin Lewis Stephens. On September 18, 1901, the first buildings were opened—initially Martin Hall (named for Robert Martin), Foster Hall (named for Governor Murphy J. Foster), and a shop building. The first class was 100 students enrolled and 8 faculty, and by 1903 the first graduating class was 18 students.

By 1920, the school changed to a four-year course culminating with a bachelor of arts degree. In 1921, the school was renamed Southwestern Louisiana Institute of Liberal and Technical Learning (SLI).

By 1960, the school was renamed University of Southwestern Louisiana (USL).

In 1974, the College of Sciences was officially formed. In 1984, following approval from the Board of Trustees for State Colleges and Universities (now UL System), USL officially changed its name to the University of Louisiana, which was overturned less than a month later by an act of the state legislature, although two schools had previously changed their names using the same technique without outside interference. The school was renamed in 1999, to the University of Louisiana at Lafayette (UL Lafayette).

== Campus ==
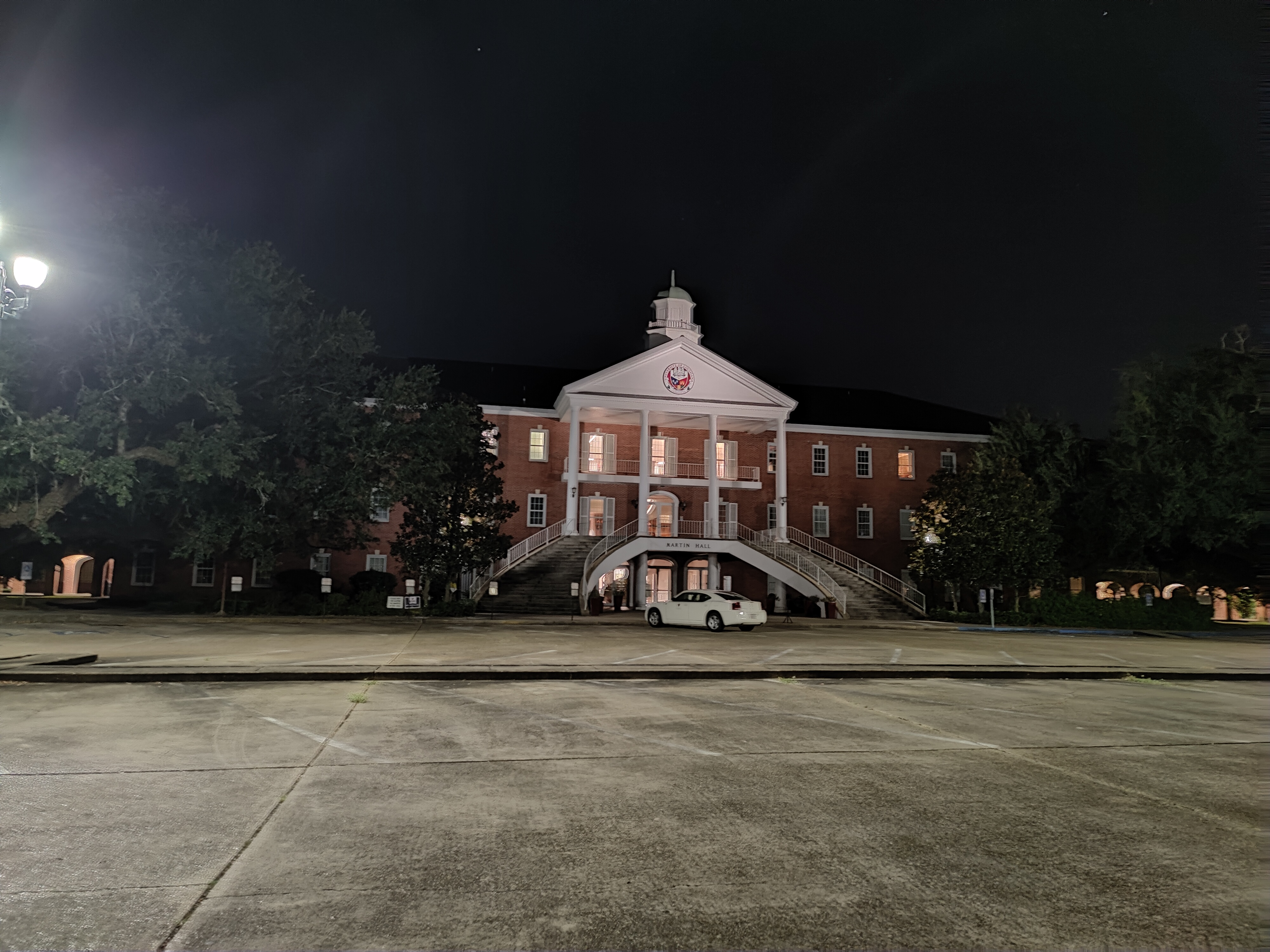
Martin Hall

The campus of the University of Louisiana at Lafayette is located in Lafayette, Louisiana, within the intrastate region of Acadiana.

=== Main campus ===
The historic main campus area originally consisted of only 25 acres, and its boundaries were Johnston Street, University Avenue, what is now Hebrard Blvd and to approximately Lee Hall in the Quad. By the 1930s the campus had more than doubled in size, to 60 acres, reaching to the newly constructed St Mary Street to its south, and McKinley Street to its east. This area includes such buildings/areas as: Martin Hall (Admin building), Girard Hall, Stephens Memorial, the Arcade, the Quadrangle (the Quad), Rose Garden dormitories, Judice-Rickles Halls, and Cypress Lake. Also, the two oldest extant buildings on campus are located in this area: Foster Hall (1902) and DeClouet Hall (1905).

==== The Quadrangle ====
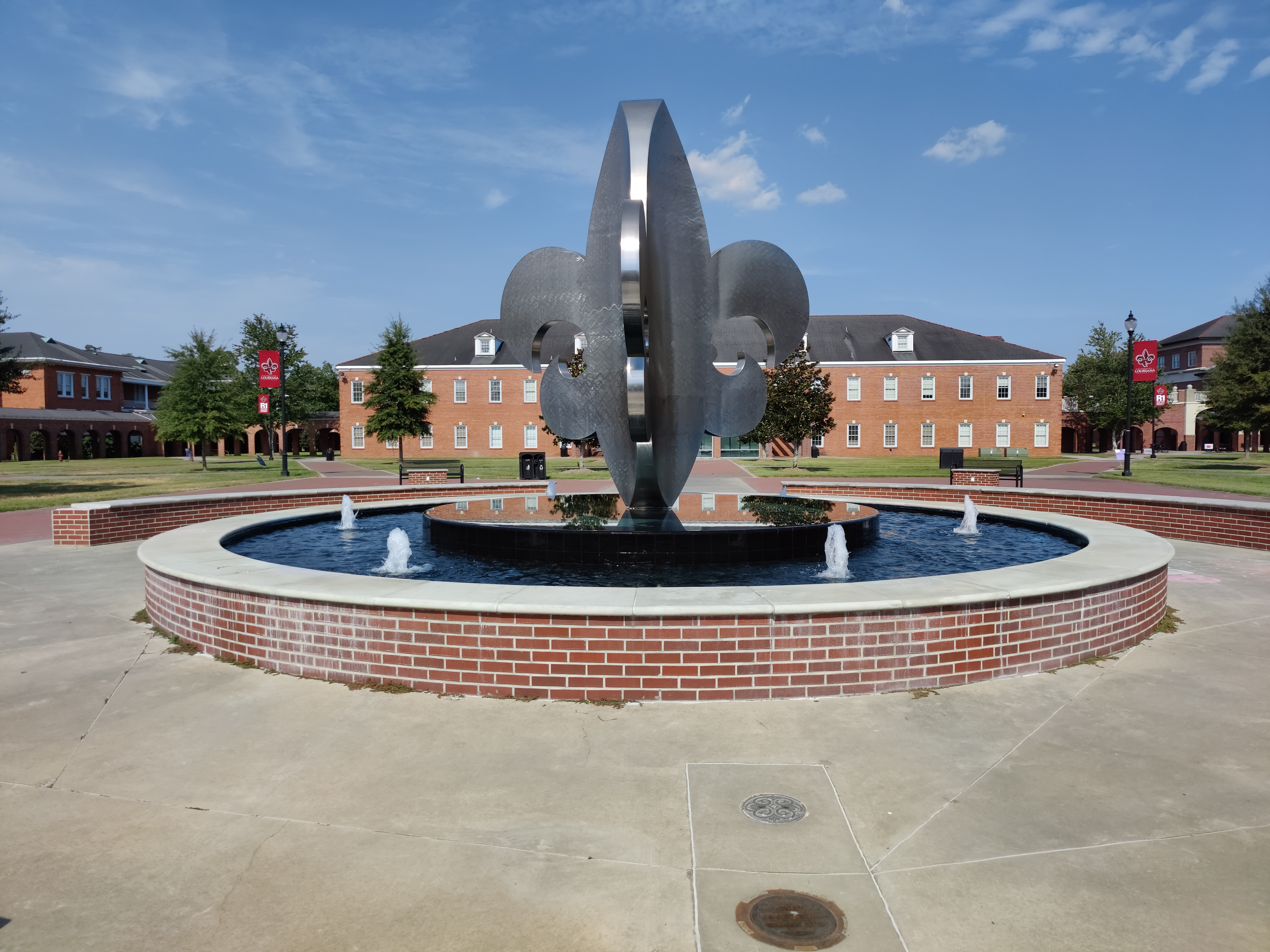
Fleur-di-lis fountain in UL Quad

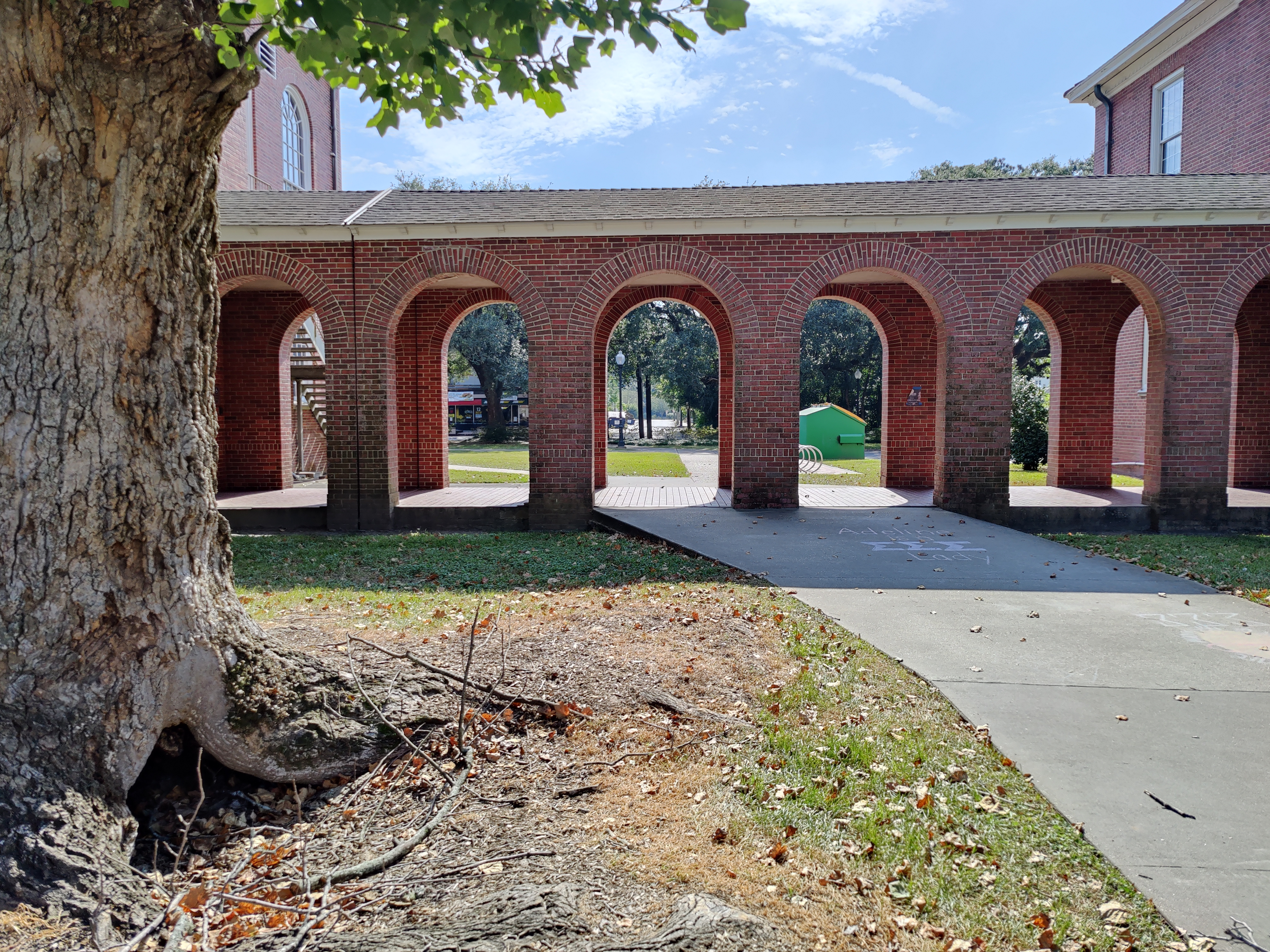
The Arcade by Stephen Hall

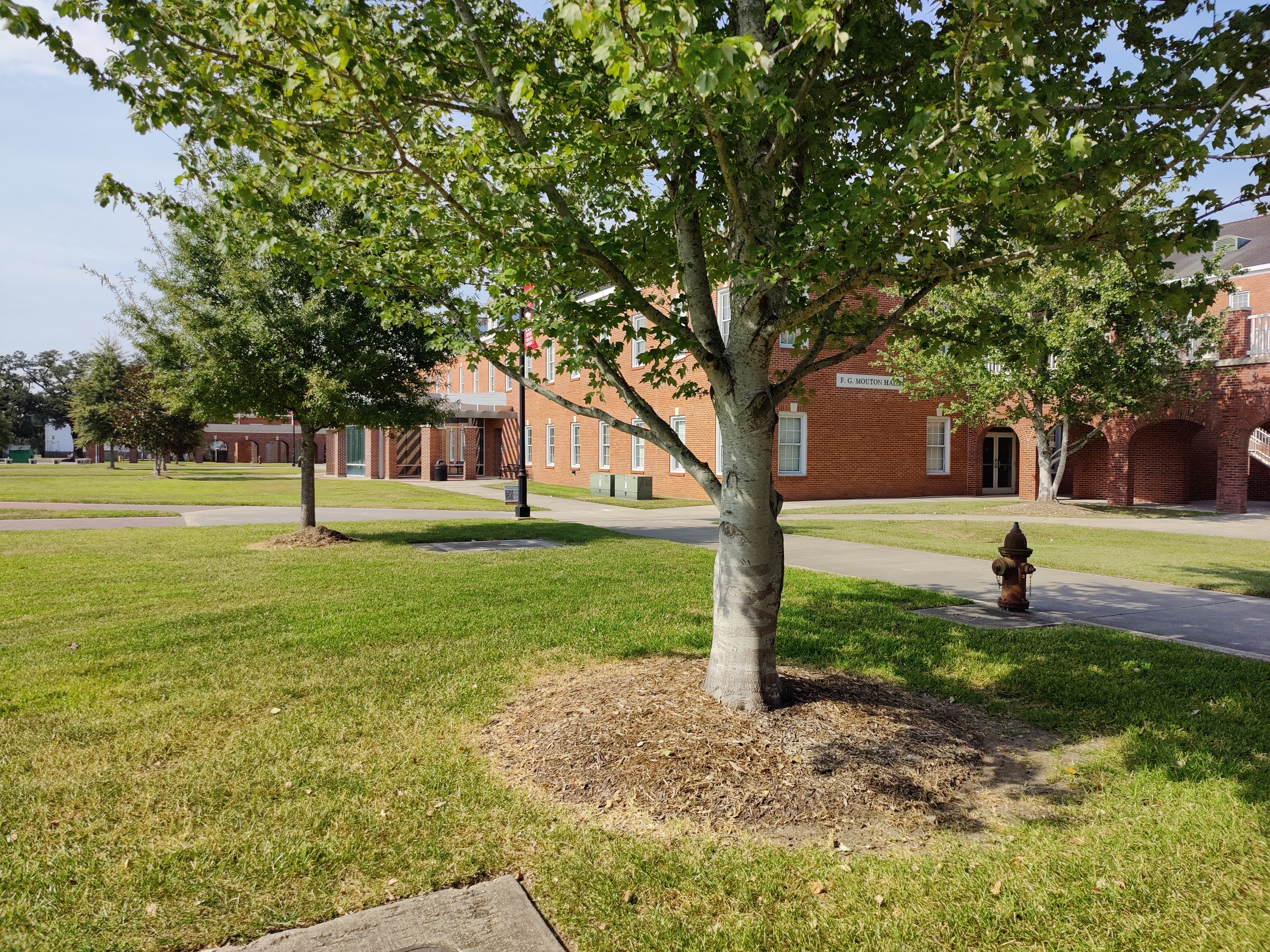
A tree in UL Quad

The Quadrangle (Quad), which was completely renovated in 2015 (providing new walkways, landscaping and a fountain containing a 15-foot Fleur de Lis in its center), serves as the 'heart' of the university. It is surrounded by Martin Hall/FG Mouton Hall, as well as Moody, OK Allen, Lee, Broussard, Stephens, Mouton, M. Doucet, and Foster Halls. Some of the highlights of the Quad are:

Martin Hall: Originally called "the main building" was the first building constructed on campus, and was completed in September 1901. Now sometimes referred to as "Old" Martin Hall, it stood on campus until 1963, when it was demolished and replaced with the current "New" Martin Hall. It is where the university president and administrative staff for the university are located.
The Arcade: A covered, brick walkway that both surrounds and defines the quad. Built in 1940, and consisting of 415 brick arches, It also is where the "Walk of Honor" begins.
Walk of Honor: This feature honors every one of the undergraduates of the university, from 1903 onward, with a paver engraved with their name and year of graduation. Originally contained in the Arcade only, it now extends to the sidewalks within the Quad, continuing outside the Quad along Boucher Ave, and then turning onto McKinley. Future plans are that it will eventually turn onto St. Mary, heading towards Boucher Street.
The Fountain: Located in the center of the Quad is a circular fountain, with an aluminum, 15' three-sided Fleur de Lis sculpture as its centerpiece. Designed by over 100 UL students over a five year period, the sculpture weighs over 3,000 pounds. Surrounded by benches it provides a popular gathering spot for students. Once the landscaping has fully matured, it is hoped that this will further give an oasis type feeling to the area.

==== Rose Garden Dormitory Complex ====
Located on the campus block bordered by Hebrard Blvd, University Ave and McKinley St, the original Rose Garden was surrounded by Baker-Huger, Randolph, Evangeline, and Bonin Halls, which were all female-only dormitories and designed by A. Hays Town and completed in 1950. In 2011 Baker-Huger, Evangeline and Bonin Halls were all demolished and were replaced with expanded/state of the art co-ed dormitories, named Coronna and Bonin Halls, now known as the Rose Garden complex.

==== Cypress Lake and Student Union Complex ====
Cypress Lake and Cypress Lake Plaza: One of the most beloved features on the campus, Cypress Lake is a university landmark that is also a habitat for native irises, alligators, turtles, birds and fish, as well as a hangout for students and a point of interest for tourists visiting Lafayette, Louisiana. Cypress Lake is casually called "The Swamp," which is also the nickname of the Louisiana Ragin' Cajuns football stadium, officially named Our Lady of Lourdes Stadium. This ecosystem, located in the center of a university, it the only one of its kind in the United States. Many school traditions are held on/around the lake, especially during "Lagniappe Day." Cypress Lake Plaza is a green space that was constructed in 2018-2019, following the removal of the former student union complex located along Hebrard Blvd. The new Plaza allows for more interaction between the students/faculty/alumni/public and Cypress Lake as well as allows Cypress Lake to be viewable from Hebrard Boulevard.
Student Union Complex: At 128K sq feet and completed in 2015 the new "U" was built to wrap around Cypress Lake, and includes numerous meeting spaces for students, as well several dining options (including the main dining room located on the second floor with floor to ceiling windows offering sweeping views of the lake), SGA offices, a post office, banquet space and a movie theater (the "Bayou Bijou.")

==== Expansion, 1950–2024 ====
The decades of the 1950 to 1970s saw tremendous growth, both in the city of Lafayette as well as the university. During that period the main campus again expanded: to the east (Taft St), west (Rex St), and south (Lewis St) bringing the total amount of acreage for the main campus to an approx. 125 acres. Many new academic buildings were located in this area including Dupre Library, HL Griffin Hall (liberal arts), Billeaud Hall (biology), Madison Hall (engineering), Wharton (nursing), Angelle (music), Fletcher (art/architecture).

In 2012, and as part of the selling of its "Horse Farm" property to the city of Lafayette, the university acquired an additional 20 acres along the Johnston/Lewis St corridor when the Youth Park/Dog Park was added to the main campus. In fall 2018, this area was being developed as housing for upperclassmen, and is called the "Heritage at Cajun Village." With the addition of these 20 acres, the total acreage for the main campus is now at 145 acres.

Law enforcement services on the campus are provided by the University of Louisiana at Lafayette Police Department.

===== Fletcher Hall and Marais Press =====
The Marais Press began in the early 1990s, a printmaking shop featuring antique presses and located within Fletcher Hall and the Department of Fine Arts. The first project was a book featuring the work of the late Elemore Morgan Jr., a Louisiana artist who taught at the university and received international acclaim for his work as a painter and photographer. More than 200 visiting artists from around the world participate for a week-long residency to work on their projects at Marais Press, a teaching and research hub. Artists help train and mentor students, who get hands-on experience making lithographs, woodcuts, silkscreen, and etchings.

Marais Press is a separate entity from the UL Press, the publishing arm of UL Lafayette's Center for Louisiana Studies.

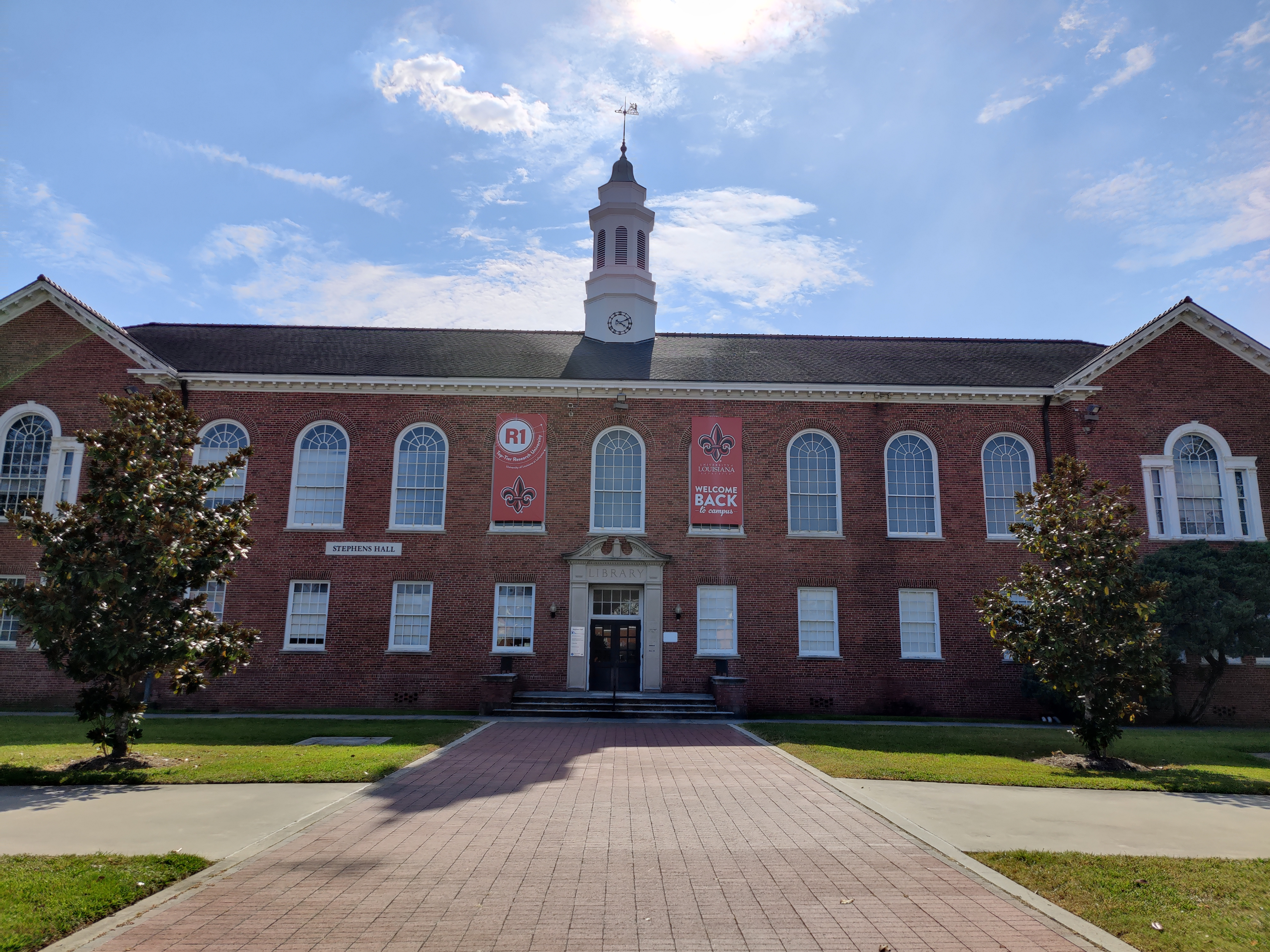
Stephens Hall

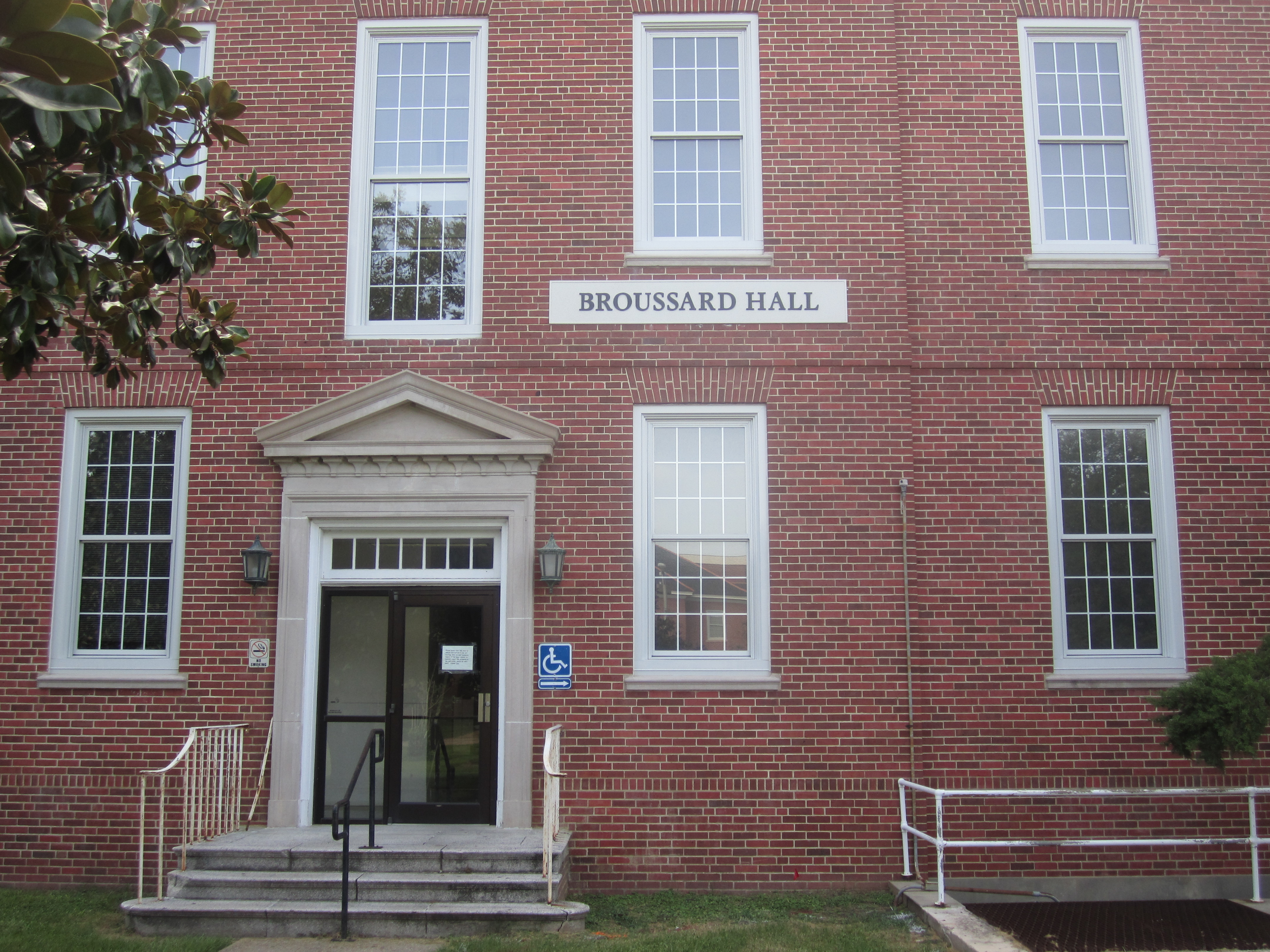
Broussard Hall, named for former U.S. Senator Robert F. Broussard, houses the Physics Department.

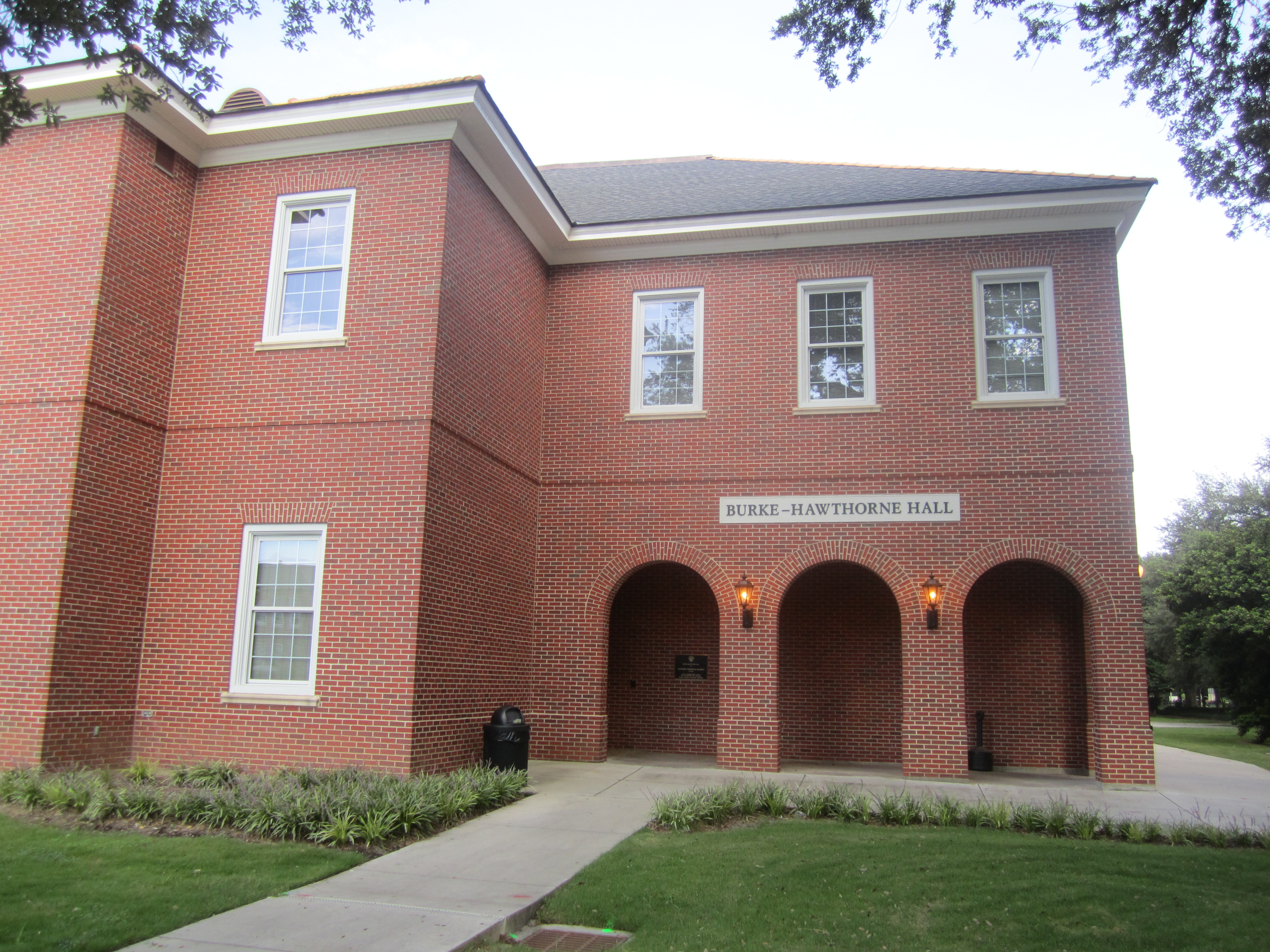
Burke-Hawthorne Hall, named for Walter Burke and Doris Hawthorne, houses the Communications Department.

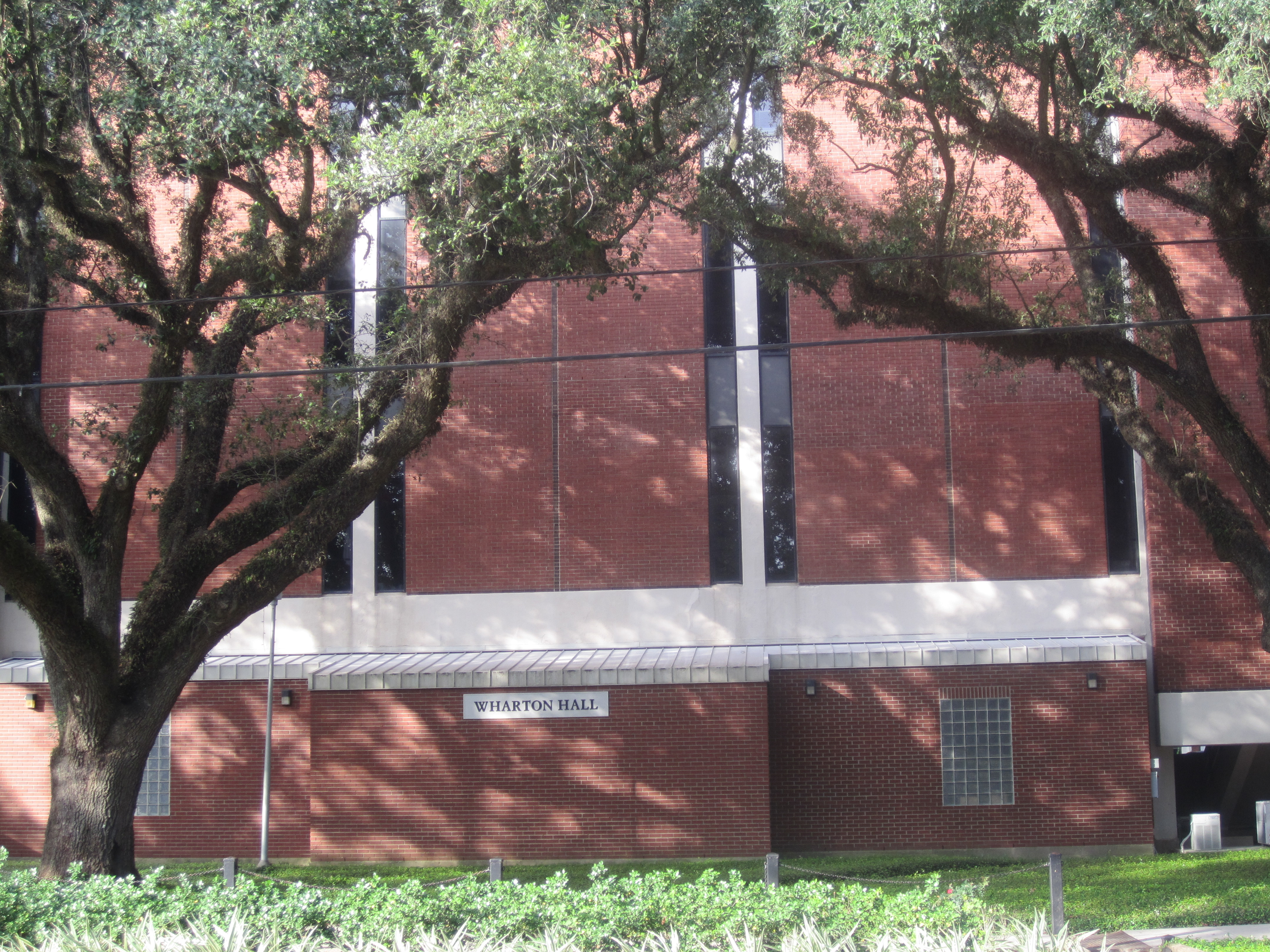
Wharton Hall houses the Biology and Nursing Departments, as well as Television Studio Labs for the Communications Department.

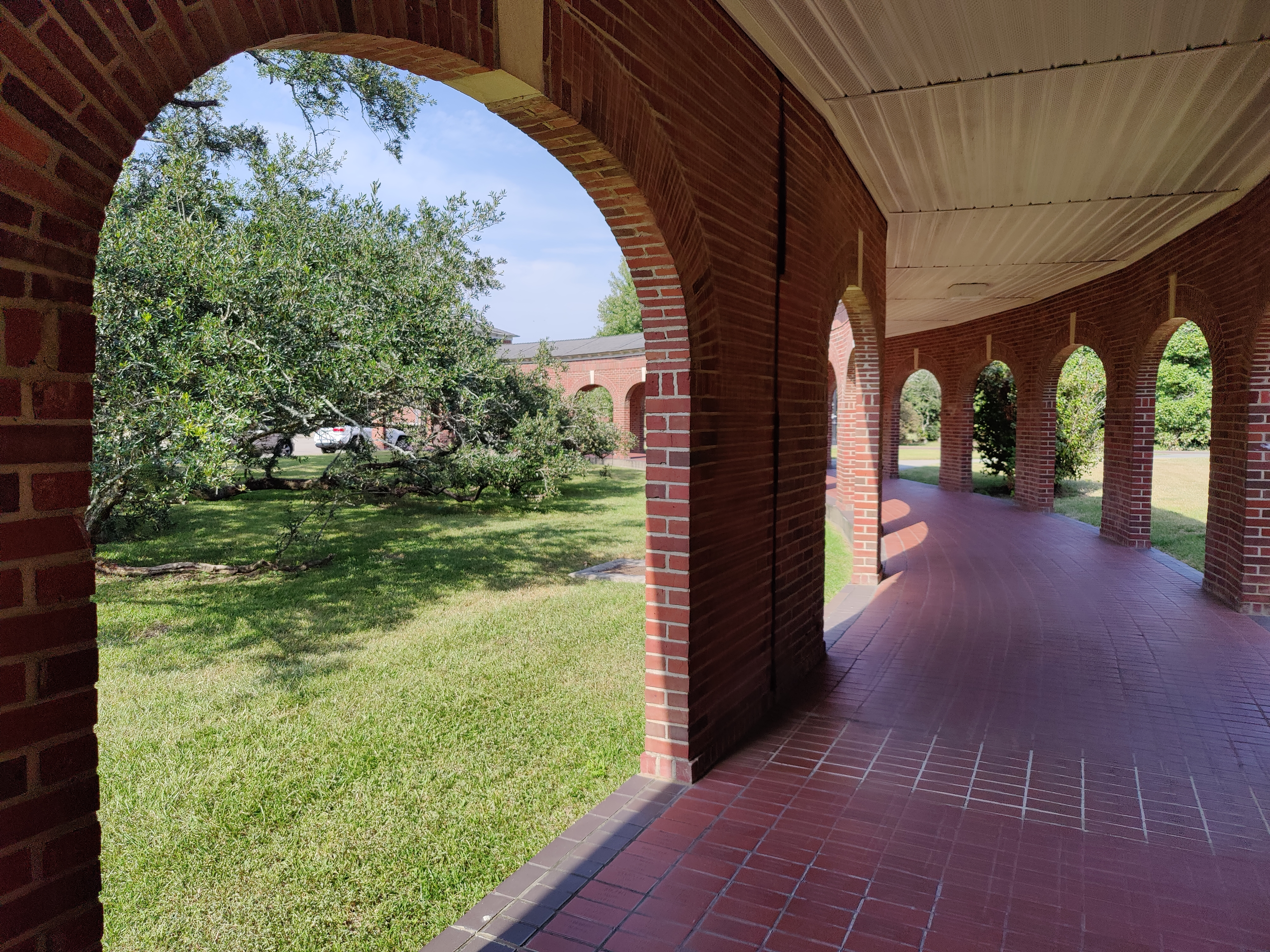
Partial view of the Arcade

=== Health Science Campus ===
Beginning in 2022, the University finalized the purchase of two separate properties that were formally used as Our Lady of Lourdes Medical Center's location and consists of a total of approximately 25 acres.

Ideally located between the main campus and the University Commons (which includes the main athletic facilities) and Research Park, this purchase creates a natural bridge, helping to unite the various locations, and which is in accordance with the school's 2012 Master Plan.

==== 2022 Diocese of Lafayette purchase ====
In the summer of 2022 UL finalized the purchase of approximately 5.8 acres of land owned by the Diocese of Lafayette and which included several structures that were part of Our Lady of Lourdes Regional Medical Center campus. The 5.834-acre tract is located at West St. Mary Boulevard and St. Landry Street and includes several structures.

=== 2023 Our Lady of Lourdes purchase ===
In the spring of 2023, the university finalized the purchase of approximately 19.2 acres that were formally used as the Our Lady of Lourdes Medical Center campus.

=== University Commons ===
Starting with the purchase of the Whittington Farm property in 1936, the university added about 175 acres just south of the main campus, along Johnston St. This area, now also consisting of the Athletic Complex and Research Park areas form a total contiguous area of over 391 acres, known today as University Commons.

==== Athletic Complex ====
Due to the continuing growth of the university during the 1950s, '60s and '70s, all of the main athletic facilities were relocated from the main campus to the University Commons area, and is bounded roughly by Reinhardt Dr, Bertrand St, Congress St and State St. The following is a list of major buildings in the complex:

Located along Coliseum Road, the complex consists of a newly constructed Field House, as well as ~20 lighted acres of grassy fields, and convenient parking. This space enables the university the ability to offer numerous sports/activities to the student population.

=== Research Park ===
Bounded by Cajundome Blvd, E. Landry Road, and Congress St, the Research Park was conceived and developed to be a stimulant for innovation and economic development that serves the region, state, and nation. The following is a list of major buildings located in the park:

University Research Park Hotel: Owned by the university, the hotel is a Hilton Garden Inn property. The 155-room hotel includes both classroom and faculty office accommodations and is collaboratively run with the UL Hospitality Management Program.
Lafayette Primary Care Center: LPCC is a joint effort among Ochsner Lafayette General Medical Center and the University of Louisiana at Lafayette. The facility is owned by the university, was paid for by Lafayette General Medical Center and Our Lady of Lourdes Regional Medical Center. It is operated by Ochsner Lafayette General Medical Center and its mission is to train medical residents in family practice.
CGI Group: CGI Group (more commonly known as CGI) is a Canadian global information technology company that offers many different IT-related services, including consulting, systems integration, outsourcing, and solutions. The company is headquartered in Montreal, Quebec, Canada. Currently employing 400 full-time people in its Lafayette location, that number is expected to more than double in the near future.
Estuarine Habitats and Coastal Fisheries Center: Owned by the National Oceanic and Atmospheric Administration, the center opened in 1998 and has numerous high-profile tenants, including: National Marine Fisheries Service, National Ocean Service, U.S. Army Corps of Engineers, U.S. Geological Survey, U.S. Department of Agriculture, National Resources Conservation Services, U.S. Fish and Wildlife Service, etc.
Louisiana Immersive Technologies Enterprise (LITE Center): A collaboration between UL and the Lafayette Economic Development Authority (LEDA), the LITE Center is housed in a $27 million, 70,000 square foot complex. The LITE Center is a comprehensive and tightly integrated data visualization and super-computing installation. The center's mission is to connect the most creative and dynamic academic minds with the most innovative and forward-looking industry visionaries.
National Wetlands Research Center: Opened in 1992, the NWRC is owned and operated by the U.S. Geological Survey whose mission is to provide national leadership in biological research and development related to protecting, restoring, and managing natural resources, with an emphasis on fish, wildlife, and wetlands in the South. It is currently focusing on wetland, forest, and animal ecology; spatial analysis; and information and technology transfer.
Photovoltaic Applied Research and Testing Laboratory: Located at the intersection of Cajundome Blvd and E. Landry road, the PART lab is a six acre solar array that is used to study the market's newest alternative energy products and to provide a training ground for students. Additionally, the energy that is collected at this site provides for the majority of the university's sports complex energy needs (1.1 megawatts out of the total average consumption of 1.2 megawatts of power.)
Cecil J. Picard Center for Child Development and Lifelong Learning: The Picard Center is a leading university-level research center that produces rigorous, innovative, and actionable knowledge in order to ensure that all children get a strong start and continuous support for excelling in school and life.

==== Other research centers ====
Cade Farm Labs: Located roughly 15 miles from the main campus, the 600-acre complex accommodates numerous facilities in an integrated array including: a working dairy, a Crawfish Research Center and an equestrian arena. The farm also includes production acreage for beef, sugar cane and specialty crops.
Cleco Alternative Energy Center, Crowley, Louisiana. A 5-acre research center dedicated to investigating ways to provide clean and affordable energy to America's homes and businesses. Research areas include biomass gasification, torrefaction, and digestion.
Ecology Center: A 50.9-acre facility cultivating native grasslands and other plants, the Center provides resources to scientists within and outside Louisiana for multi-disciplinary research, and fosters community involvement and social awareness about the importance of Louisiana's ecological diversity.
New Iberia Research Center: A 118-acre site located in New Iberia, La. and containing 24 buildings at a total of ~485,000 square feet, the NIRC is a diversified animal housing system that includes indoor/outdoor cages for small non-human primates in large family groups, outdoor corncrib/minicrib combinations for housing macaque and Cercopithecine species, and indoor single housing units for all non-human primate species in cage sizes recommended by the United States Department of Agriculture. Consisting of over 6,800 non-human primates, the NIRC is the largest primate center in the US.(See more detailed info of the NIRC in main article.)

== Research ==
The university is a member of the Southeastern Universities Research Association and is classified among "R1: Doctoral Universities – Very high research activity". In 2023, the university posted a record-breaking amount of $181 million, exceeding the previous year's amount of $144 million and represents an astonishing 165% increase in R&D spending at UL in seven years. The 2019 amount placed UL among the top 23 percent of the 647 research universities; current rankings are not yet available. It is the stated mission of UL's Strategic Plan to reach Carnegie Classification Research 1 status and surpassing the $100 million threshold is a major step in that direction. The university receives more research money than all of the other ULS schools, combined, and is rated one of the top 100 public research universities in the nation according to a 2010 report by The Nelson A. Rockefeller Institute of Government. In 2012, it became the first Louisiana university designated as an NSF Industry/University Cooperative Research Center. The Center for Visual and Decision Informatics is the only NSF Center in the nation that focuses on data science, big data analytics, and visual analytics.

=== New Iberia Research Center ===
UL's New Iberia Research Center in New Iberia conducts basic and applied research on several species of non-human primates including macaques, grivets, capuchins and chimpanzees. Incorporated as the Gulf South Research Institute in 1965, the facility was transferred to UL in 1984. The Center houses over 6,800 non-human primates used for breeding and studies. The center is also a contract breeding and testing facility, selling animals to other laboratories and conducting experiments under contract with other parties.

In 2008, the Humane Society of the United States conducted an undercover investigation in the center which found monkeys being shot with sedation guns while in their cages, one monkey repeatedly hit by a worker in the teeth with a metal pole and another worker striking an infant monkey among other apparent AWA violations. In 2015, the U.S. Department of Agriculture cited the center for six potential violations of the Animal Welfare Act (AWA) which the government alleges lead to the death of one monkey, injuries to another and the escape of five from their enclosure.

In 2016, Project Chimps, a nonprofit organization, announced a partnership with NIRC to relocate 220 of the university's retired research chimpanzees to a sanctuary in northern Georgia.

== Academics ==
UL Lafayette is accredited by the Southern Association of Colleges and Schools. All undergraduate programs at UL Lafayette that are eligible for accreditation by professional agencies are accredited. The University of Louisiana at Lafayette Honors Program is an active member of the Louisiana, Southern Regional, and National Honors Councils. The university graduates about 1,700 students each fall and spring.

The university offers more than 80 undergraduate degree programs, 27 master's degree programs, and 10 doctoral degree programs.

=== Rankings ===
Academic rankings

National
- Forbes: 555
- U.S. News & World Report: 373 (tie)
- Washington Monthly: 281
- WSJ/College Pulse: > 600

Global
- U.S. News & World Report: 1706 (tie)

- In 2018, No. 24 U.S. News & World Report list of "Universities and Colleges Where Students Are Eager to Enroll"
- In 2017, No. 9 Brookings Institution social mobility report "Ladders, labs, or laggards? Which public universities contribute most"
- In 2018, "Best 382 Colleges", by The Princeton Review
- Named to the "2014 President's Higher Education Community Service Honor Roll."
- No. 10 among research universities for percentage of research and development expenditures funded by business, National Science Foundation September 2013 Report.

== Campus publishing ==
In the 1960s, a group of liberal arts professors at the University of Southwestern Louisiana began publishing their works under the imprint USL History Series. Then, in 1973, the Center for Louisiana Studies was established, and the organization took on the publication of these works, in addition to "publications drawn from research in the Center's Colonial Records Project, proceedings from historical associations and conferences, and works translated by Center staff".

Over the next few decades, the center's publications grew to include scholarship beyond the university as well as new genres, such as children's books, photography, poetry, and fiction. In 2009, its imprint was changed to the University of Louisiana at Lafayette Press, publishing as the UL Press. The Press welcomes submissions of manuscripts pertaining to all facets of Louisiana's history, culture, art, society, politics, economics, religion, ethnicities, and environment. It also welcomes high quality works of fiction, poetry, and creative nonfiction.

Today, the UL Press is the largest academic publisher of Louisiana-related works and one of the two largest academic publishers in the state. The press is an introductory member of the Association of University Presses.

== Athletics ==
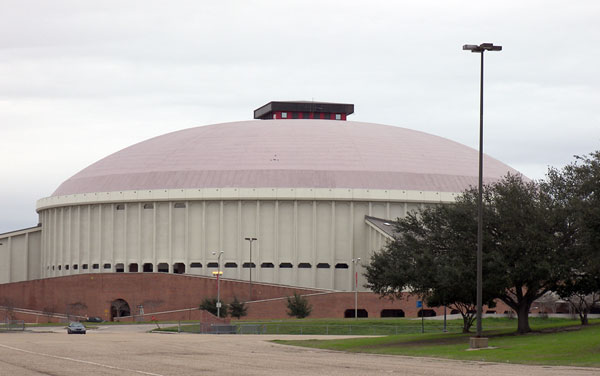
Cajundome is the home of the men's and women's basketball teams

The Louisiana Ragin' Cajun teams participate in NCAA Division I (FBS for football) in the Sun Belt Conference. The Ragin' Cajuns compete in 16 NCAA sports teams (8 men's, 8 women's teams), including baseball, basketball (men's and women's), cross country (men's and women's), football, softball, women's soccer, women's volleyball, men's golf, tennis (men's and women's), and track and field (men's and women's, indoor and outdoor).

The athletic program formally began in 1904 with a track and field program. Since the beginning of the 21st century, the softball team has been among the most successful of all Ragin' Cajun teams, having won twenty-two regular season championships, seventeen conference tournament championships, and earning six appearances in the Women's College World Series. The baseball, men's tennis, men's basketball, and football teams have won conference championships.

In 1973, the university became one of only five schools to ever receive the NCAA's Death Penalty, when the men's basketball program was barred from competing in the NCAA for the 1973–74 and 1974–75 seasons.

In 2014, the Cajuns became the first in college football bowl history to win the same bowl game in four straight seasons. However, the university vacated all of its 2011 wins, including the New Orleans Bowl, two years later when the NCAA sanctioned the university because an assistant football coach conspired to "obtain fraudulent entrance exam scores" for five recruits from 2011 until 2013. The university dismissed the coach in 2014 and sued the testing company in 2016 for failing to adequately supervise their staff and testing procedures. The NCAA accepted the university's self-imposed penalties including a two-year probation, a small fine, a small reduction in football scholarships, and recruiting restrictions.

In recent years, Ragin' Cajuns football has been on the rise, becoming nationally ranked during the 2020 and 2021 seasons with Billy Napier at the helm of the program.

== Student life ==
Undergraduate demographics as of Fall 2026
Race and ethnicity	Total
White	57%
Black	27%
Hispanic	6%
Two or more races	5%
Asian	2%
Unknown	2%
International student	1%
Economic diversity
Low-income (Note: The percentage of students who received an income-based federal Pell grant intended for low-income students.)	43%
Affluent (Note: The percentage of students who are a part of the American middle class at the bare minimum.)	57%

There are over 200 student organizations.

The Louisiana Center for Cultural & Eco-Tourism center's research division houses the world's largest collection of Cajun and Creole folklore, oral history, and folklife materials and some of the nation's largest microfilm collections of French and Spanish colonial records.

=== Residential life ===
Beginning in 2011 the university began a massive program to overhaul its residential options for students. Since that time, the majority of the school's former dormitories have been demolished and replaced with either apartment or suite style accommodations. The first phase of the initiative began in 2003, with the demolition of three of the male-only dorms: Caffery, Roy and McCullough. They were replaced with Legacy Park in 2004, an apartment-style complex that is also co-ed. (Another male-only dorm, Voorhies Hall, was also razed in 2003, but the Child Development complex was built in its place.) The final male-only dorm, Stokes Hall, was demolished in 2016, with the long-term plan of expanding Legacy Park into the area.

In 2011 the second phase of the project began when most of the traditional female-only dorms were demolished and replaced with suite-style, co-ed, units. The dorms demolished during this period included: Baker-Huger, Bonin, Evangeline, Denbo, and Bancroft. The two resulting areas are now known as the Rose Garden Complex (lower classmen), and the Taft Street Complex (upper classmen); 2018 saw the start of the third phase of the project when construction began on a new complex located at the corner of Johnston and Lewis streets. This area formerly consisted of a university-owned parking lot, as well the Youth/Dog Park, which the university acquired as part of the sale of the "Horse Farm" property to the City of Lafayette. Named "The Heritage at Cajun Village," the new complex is designated for married students/families and graduate students. Following the completion of the complex (fall 2019) the married/family complex "Cajun Village" has been planned for eventual demolition and replaced with suite-style living for upper classmen.

As of 2023 only three of the original dorms on campus remain standing: Randolph Hall (now functioning as a recreational center for residents), Agnes Edwards Hall (now co-ed/junior suite-style) and Harris Hall (now co-ed/traditional-style). Following the completion of Heritage, as well as Rose Garden and Taft Street complexes, the university could house close to 5,000 students on campus, achieving a goal set in the school's master plan as of 2020.

=== Greek life ===
The Greek community at the University of Louisiana at Lafayette is composed of 23 organizations. In 2022, 6% of undergraduate men and 13% of undergraduate women were active in the UL's Greek system.

== Notable firsts ==
- 1954 – Within months of the Brown v. Board of Education decision by the U.S. Supreme Court, SLI admitted 70 African-American students, becoming the first all-white public college in the Deep South to desegregate
- 1961 – Established the first university chapter of the Association for Computing Machinery (ACM) for students. It is named the ACM Alpha Student Chapter
- 1962 – Offered the first Master of Science degree in computer science in the U.S.
- 1994 – Created first francophone studies Ph.D. program in the Western hemisphere, and only the third in the world
- 2007 – The Cajun Advanced Picosatellite Experiment (CAPE) successfully launches the State of Louisiana's first university student built satellite, CAPE-1
- 2008 – Ray Paul Authement, the university president from 1974 to 2008, became the longest serving president of a public university in the United States
- 2012 – Became the first Louisiana university designated as an NSF Industry/University Cooperative Research Center
- 2017 – Approved to offer the first master's degree in informatics in the state of Louisiana, beginning Spring 2018
