= List of television programs: C =

Alphabetically indexed lists of television programs
0–9	A	B	C	D	E	F	G	H	I–J
K–L	M	N	O	P	Q–R	S	T	U–V–W	X–Y–Z

This is an alphabetical list of television program articles (or sections within articles about television programs). Spaces and special characters are ignored. This list covers television programs whose first letter (excluding "the") of the title is C.

== C ==
=== CA ===
- C.A.B.
- Cade's County
- Cadillacs and Dinosaurs
- Caesar's Hour
- Cagney & Lacey
- Caillou
- Caitlin's Way
- Cake
- Cake Boss
- Cake Wars
- California Dreams
- California Fever
- Californication
- Calimero
- Callan
- Call to Glory
- Call Me Kat
- Call the Midwife (BBC)
- Call My Agent! (France)
- Call Red
- Calucci's Department
- Camberwick Green (British)
- Camelot
- Camouflage
- Camp
- Camp Candy
- Camp Lakebottom
- Camp Lazlo
- Camp Runamuck
- Camp WWE
- Campion (BBC)
- Canada's Next Top Model
- Canadian Idol
- Candice Tells All (Canada)
- Candid Camera
- Candidly Nicole
- Candle in the Tomb (China)
- The Candy Apple News Company
- Canimals
- Cannon
- Cannonball
- Naeil's Cantabile (South Korea)
- Canterbury's Law
- Can You Duet
- The Cape (1996)
- The Cape (2011)
- Caprica
- Captain Caveman and the Teen Angels
- Captain Flamingo
- Captain Kangaroo
- Captain N: The Game Master
- Captain Nice
- Captain Planet and the Planeteers
- Captain Power
- Captain Scarlet and the Mysterons
- Captain Video and His Video Rangers
- Car 54, Where Are You?
- Cara Sucia (Venezuela)
- The Cara Williams Show
- The Carbonaro Effect
- Card Captors
- Card Sharks
- Care Bears
- Care Bears: Adventures in Care-a-lot
- Care Bears & Cousins
- The Care Bears Family
- Caribe (United States)
- Caribe (Venezuela)
- Carl²
- Carmen Sandiego (2019)
- The Carmichael Show
- Carnival Eats
- Carnivàle
- The Carol Burnett Show
- The Carol Duvall Show
- Caroline in the City
- Caroline & Friends
- The Caroline Rhea Show
- Carpoolers
- Carpool Karaoke: The Series
- The Carrie Diaries
- Car SOS
- Carter Country
- Cartoon Planet
- Carson Nation
- The Casagrandes
- Casey Jones (American Western)
- Cash Cab (British original)
  - Cash Cab (Australia)
  - Cash Cab (Canada)
  - Cash Cab (Japan)
  - Cash Cab (US)
- Casper's Scare School
- Casper and Friends
- The Castaways (Australia)
- Castaways (US)
- Castle
- Castle Rock
- Castlevania
- Casualty (British)
- The Cat in the Hat Knows a Lot About That!
- Catalyst
- The Catch
- Catch 21
- Catch 22
- Catchphrase
- CatDog
- Catfish: The TV Show
- The Catherine Tate Show
- Catherine the Great
- Catscratch
- Catwalk (Australia)
- Cave Kids
- Cavemen

=== CB ===
- CBS Evening News
- CBS Morning News
- CBS News Sunday Morning
- CBS Overnight News
- CBS Storybreak
- CBS This Morning

=== CE ===
- Cedar Cove
- The Celebrity Apprentice
- Celebrity Big Brother (UK)
- Celebrity Big Brother (US)
- Celebrity Blackjack
- Celebrity Charades
- Celebrity Deathmatch
- Celebrity Family Feud
- Celebrity Jeopardy!
- Celebrity Juice
- Celebrity Name Game
- Celebrity Page
- Celebrity Rehab Presents Sober House
- Celebrity Rehab with Dr. Drew
- Celebrity Undercover Boss
- Celebrity Watch Party
- Celebs Go Dating (UK)
- Centaurworld
- Centennial
- Central Park
- Central Park West
- A Certain Scientific Railgun
- C. Everett Koop, M.D.

=== CH ===
- Chain Reaction
- Chalk
- ChalkZone
- The Challenge
- The Challenge: Champs vs. Stars
- Champion the Wonder Horse
- Champions
- The Champions (Canada)
- The Champions (UK)
- Championship Wrestling from Hollywood
- The Changes (UK)
- Channel Zero
- Chaotic
- Chappelle's Show
- Charles in Charge
- Charlie Chalk
- Charlie Jade
- Charlie Rose
- Charlie's Angels (1976)
- Charlie's Angels (2011)
- Charlie Brown
- The Charlie Brown & Snoopy Show
- Charlie and Lola (UK)
- Charleyyy & Friends
- Charmed (1998)
- Charmed (2018)
- The Charmings
- Charm School
- The Chart Show (UK)
- Chase (1973)
- Chase (2010)
- The Chase (2006 drama)
- The Chase (UK game show)
- The Chase (US game show)
- The Chase Australia
- Cha$e
- Chasing Life
- Chasing Maria Menounos
- Cheaters
- Cheating Craft (2016) (Japan)
- Checking In
- Cheech & Chong: Roasted
- Cheerleader Nation
- Cheer Perfection
- Cheers
- Cheez TV
- Chef!
- Chefography
- Chef School
- Chelsea
- Chelsea Does
- The Chelsea Handler Show
- Chelsea Lately
- Chernobyl
- Chesapeake Shores
- The Chew
- Cheyenne
- The Chi
- The Chica Show
- Chicago
  - Chicago Fire
  - Chicago Justice
  - Chicago Med
  - Chicago P.D.
- Chicago Hope
- Chicagolicious
- The Chicken Squad
- Chico and the Man
- Chigley (British)
- Child Genius (UK)
- Child Genius (US)
- Child Support
- The Children of Green Knowe (UK) (1986)
- Childrens Hospital
- Children's Ward
- Child's Play
- Chilly Beach
- Chilling Adventures of Sabrina
- The Chimp Channel
- China Beach
- China, IL
- CHiPs
- Chip 'n Dale: Rescue Rangers
- Chirp (Canada)
- Chloe's Closet
- Chōyū Sekai (China/Japan, 2017)
- Chocolate News
- Chōgattai Majutsu Robo Ginguiser
- Choo Choo Soul
- Choose Up Sides
- Chop Chop Ninja
- Chop Socky Chooks
- Chopped
- Chopper One
- Chorlton and the Wheelies
- Chosen
- The Chosen (TV series)
- Chowder
- Chrisley Knows Best
- Christy
- A Christmas Carol
- Chuck's Choice
- Chuck
- ChuckleVision
- Chucky
- Chuggington (UK)
- Church Secrets & Legends
- Chuva de Maio

=== CI ===
- CI5: The New Professionals
- Ciao Darwin (Italy)
- CID (India)
- Ciel mon mardi (France)
- Cimarron Strip
- The Circle
- Circus Boy
- Cirque du Soleil: Fire Within (Canada)
- The Cisco Kid
- Citizen Rose
- The City (1995)
- The City (1999)
- The City (2008)
- City Guys
- City Lights
- Civil Wars

=== CL ===
- Clangers
- Clang Invasion
- Clarence (UK) (1988)
- Clarence (US) (2014)
- Clarissa Explains It All
- Clarkson (UK)
- Clarkson's Farm
- Clarice
- Clash of the Champions
- Class
- A Class by Himself
- Class of 3000
- Class of '74
- Class of the Titans
- Classical Baby
- Cleopatra 2525
- The Cleveland Show
- Cleo & Cuquin
- Cleopatra in Space
- Clerks: The Animated Series
- Click (UK)
- Click (US)
- The Client List
- The Clifton House Mystery
- Clifford the Big Red Dog
- Clifford's Puppy Days
- Climax!
- Cloak & Dagger
- Clone High
- Close Enough
- The Closer
- The Clothes Show (UK)
- Cloudy with a Chance of Meatballs
- Club 57
- Club Mario
- Clue Club
- Clueless
- Clutch Cargo

=== CM ===
- CMT Crossroads

=== CN ===
- CNN Special Investigations Unit

=== CO ===
- Coach
- Cobra Kai
- Coconut Fred's Fruit Salad Island!
- CODCO
- The Code (British documentary series)
- The Code (Australian drama series)
- Cocomelon
- The Code (British game show)
- The Code (US drama series)
- Code Black
- Code Geass
- Code Lyoko
- Code Monkeys
- Code Red, American drama series
- Code Red, Indian crime series
- Codename: Kids Next Door
- Co-Ed Fever
- The Colbert Report
- The Colbys
- Colby's Clubhouse
- Cold Case
- Cold Case Files
- Cold Feet
- Cold Justice
- Cold Justice: Sex Crimes
- Cold Pizza
- Colditz
- The Colgate Comedy Hour
- The Collector
- College GameDay (basketball)
- College GameDay (football)
- Colony
- The Colony
- Colonel Bleep
- Color Splash
- Color Friends
- Columbo
- Combat!
- Combo Niños (France)
- Come Dancing (British)
- Come Dine with Me
- Come Dine with Me Australia
- Comedy Central Roast
- A Comedy Roast (UK)
- Come Fly with Me (UK)
- The Comic Strip
- Commander in Chief
- The Comment Section
- The Commish
- Committed
- Common Knowledge
- Community
- The Completely Mental Misadventures of Ed Grimley
- Conan
- Concentration
- Confession (1957–1959)
- The Conners
- Connie the Cow
- Connor Undercover
- Constantine
- Constantine: City of Demons
- Container Wars
- The Contender
- Continuum (Canada)
- Contraption
- Conviction (2004) (UK)
- Conviction (2006) (US)
- Conviction (2016) (US)
- A Cook's Tour
- The Cool Kids
- Coop and Cami Ask the World
- Cops
- COPS (animated)
- Corduroy (TV series)
- The Corner
- Corner Gas
- Coronation Street (UK)
- Coronet Blue
- Cory in the House
- Cosby
- The Cosby Mysteries
- The Cosby Show
- Cosmetic Surgery Live
- Cosmic Quantum Ray
- Cotorreando
- Cougar Town
- Countdown (UK)
- Countdown (Australia)
- Count Duckula
- Counting On
- Countryfile (UK)
- The Country Mouse and the City Mouse Adventures
- Country Music Jubilee
- A Country Practice
- Country Style
- Countrytime (1960) (Canada)
- Countrytime (1970) (Canada)
- Couples Therapy
- Coupling (British TV series)
- Courage the Cowardly Dog
- The Court
- Cousins for Life
- Cousin Skeeter
- The Courtship of Eddie's Father
- Cover Story
- Cover Up
- Covert Affairs
- Cow and Chicken
- Cowboy Bebop
- The Cowboys

=== CP ===
- C.P.O. Sharkey

=== CR ===
- Cracked
- Cracker (UK)
- Cracker (US)
- Crackerjack!
- Cracking Up
- Craft Corner Deathmatch
- Craft Wars
- Craig of the Creek
- Cram
- Crashbox (Canada)
- Crashing (UK)
- Crashing (US)
- Crashletes
- Crash & Bernstein
- Crash Canyon
- Crash Zoom (Web Series)
- Crayon Shin-chan
- Crazy Ex-Girlfriend
- Crazy Like A Fox
- The Crazy Ones
- Crazy Talk
- Creature Comforts (UK)
- Creepschool
- The Crew
- The Crew (2021)
- Crikey! It's the Irwins
- Crime & Punishment
- Crime Story
- A Crime to Remember
- Crimewatch (UK)
- Criminal Minds
  - Criminal Minds
  - Criminal Minds: Beyond Borders
  - Criminal Minds: Suspect Behavior
- Criss Angel Mindfreak
- The Critic
- Cro
- Croc Files
- The Crocodile Hunter
- The Crocodile Hunter Diaries
- Crossbow
- Crossfire (Scotland)
- Crossfire (US)
- The Crossing
- Crossing Jordan
- Crossing Swords
- Crossroads (UK)
- The Crown
- Crown Court
- Crowned
- Cruel Summer
- Crusade
- Crusade in Europe
- Crusader Rabbit
- Crusoe
- The Crystal Maze (UK)
- Crystal Tipps and Alistair (British)

=== CS ===
- CSI
  - CSI: Crime Scene Investigation
  - CSI: Cyber
  - CSI: Miami
  - CSI: NY
  - CSI: Vegas

=== CU ===
- Cubeez
- Cults and Extreme Belief
- Cupcake & Dino: General Services
- Cupcake Wars
- Cupid (1998)
- Cupid (2009)
- Curb Your Enthusiasm
- Curfew
- Curious George
- Curiosity Shop
- The Curse
- The Curse of Oak Island
- Cut (2013)
- Cut Content
- Cut (2017)
- Cuts
- Cutthroat Kitchen

=== CY ===
- The Cyanide and Happiness Show
- Cyberchase
- Cybersix
- Cybill
- Cyrus vs. Cyrus: Design and Conquer

Previous: List of television programs: B Next: List of television programs: D
