= Cash Cab (disambiguation) =

Cash Cab may refer to:

- Cash Cab, a game show franchise
  - Cash Cab (American game show)
  - Cash Cab (Australian game show)
  - Cash Cab (British game show)
  - Cash Cab (Canadian game show)
