= Cash Cab =

UK game show

- Created by: Adam Wood; Mat Steiner; Les Dennis
- Original work: Cash Cab (United Kingdom)
- Owner: All3Media
- Years: 2005–present

Cash Cab is a game show created in the United Kingdom where contestants request the cab driver to go to a destination they want to go, but they have to answer questions in order to get to their destination as well as a cash prize. The original British version aired from 13 June 2005 to 29 June 2006 on ITV. The show was subsequently franchised and adapted for multiple international markets outside the United Kingdom.

== International versions ==
| Country | Name | Host | Channel | Premiere | Finale |
|---|---|---|---|---|---|
| Algeria | Cash Taxi Algerie | Nacime Haddouche | Echorouk TV | 6 January 2021 | |
| (Arab League) Arab world | كاش تاكسي; Cash Taxi | Hisham Abdel Rahman | MBC 1 | 2008 | |
| Asia-Pacific | Cash Cab Asia | Oli Pettigrew | AXN Asia | 18 October 2011 | |
| Australia | Cash Cab | Charlie Pickering | Channel V | 29 October 2007 | 2014 |
| Australia | Cash Cab | James Kerley | Channel V | 29 October 2007 | 2014 |
| Austria | QUIZ TAXI | Max Schmiedl | Puls 4 | 16 October 2011 | |
| Austria | QUIZ TAXI eXtreme | Max Schmiedl | Puls 4 | 23 October 2011 | |
| Belgium | Taxi Vanoudenhoven | Rob Vanoudenhoven | Eén | 10 June 2012 | 2 September 2012 |
| Brazil | Taxi do Milão | Supla | RedeTV! | 2010 | |
| Canada | Cash Cab (English language version) | Adam Growe | Discovery Channel Canada | 10 September 2008; 22 April 2026 | 5 April 2014 present |
| Canada | Taxi Payant (French language version) | Alexandre Barrette | V | 3 September 2009 | 8 May 2018 |
| Chile | | | MEGA | 2012 | |
| China | 超级现金车; Cash Cab | Sòng Péng | TVS3 | 17 December 2012 | |
| Colombia | CityTaxi Efectivo | Freddy Flórez; Morella Zuleta | CityTV | 23 October 2016 | |
| Czech Republic | Taxík | Aleš Háma; Tomáš Matonoha; Monika Absolonová | Česká televize | 5 January 2008 | 31 August 2012 |
| Czech Republic | Taxi, taxi, taxi | Martin Zounar | TV Barrandov | 24 August 2015 | |
| Czech Republic | IQ Taxi | Pavel Novotný | JOJ Family | 7 October 2019 | |
| Czech Republic | Cool Taxi | Václav Matějovský; Vincent Navrátil | Prima Cool | 30 September 2024 | |
| Denmark | Taxaquizzen | Sigurd Kongshøj Larsen | TV2 | 29 September 2011 | |
| Egypt | كاش تاكسي; Cash Taxi | Nashwa Mustafa | MBC Masr | 9 July 2013 | |
| France | Taxi Cash | Alexandre Devoise | W9 | 23 October 2010 | |
| Germany | Quiz Taxi | Thomas Hackenberg | Kabel eins | 18 April 2006 | 2 June 2008 |
| Germany | Quiz Taxi Reloaded | Murat Topal | Kabel eins | 27 February 2012 | |
| Greece | Taxi Girl | Vicky Stavropoulou | Mega Channel | 2006 | |
| Greece | TAXI | Alexandros Tsouvelas | ANT1 | 19 September 2020 | |
| Hungary | Tutifuvar - A taxiquiz | Gianni Annoni | Viasat 3 | 2007 | |
| India | Airtel Cash Cab | Munish Mukhija | UTV Bindass | 2007 | |
| Indonesia | Taksi Selebriti | Farhan; Ulfa Dwiyanti | antv | 2009 | |
| Israel | מונית הכסף; Monit HaKesef | Ido Rosenblum | Keshet 12 | 19 May 2007 | |
| Italy | Cash Taxi | Marco Berry | Sky Uno; Cielo | 2009 | 2010 |
| Italy | Cash Taxi | Marco Berry | LA7 | 2012 | 2013 |
| Jamaica | Claro Cash Cab | Felisha Lord; Wayne W. Whyte | Television Jamaica | 15 November 2010 | |
| Japan | キャッシュキャブ; Kyasshu Kyabu | Toshihiro Ito | Fuji TV | 1 March 2008 | |
| Kazakhstan | Такси; Taxi | Murat Ospanov | NTK; Channel 31 | 7 September 2009 | |
| Lithuania | Pinigų taksi | Karina Krysko | LNK | 30 June 2008 | |
| Malaysia | Teksi Tunai | Bob Lokman | Astro Prima | 2007 | |
| Mexico | Taxi Cash | Andrés Bustamante | Televisa | 28 January 2008 | |
| Morocco | Feen Ghadi | Taliss and Basso | 2M TV | 2020 | |
| Netherlands | Cash Cab | Kurt Rogiers; Edo Brunner | BNN | 16 January 2006 | 17 May 2006 |
| Peru | Gana Taxi | Carlos Vílchez | Frecuencia Latina | 2011 | |
| Philippines | Cash Cab Philippines | Ryan Agoncillo | AXN Philippines | 22 December 2015 | |
| Poland | Taxi | Dariusz Lech | TV4 | 8 September 2005 | 30 December 2005 |
| Poland | Taxi kasa | Kamil Baleja | Super Polsat | 10 March 2018 | 1 December 2018 |
| Romania | Cash Taxi | Cătălin Cazacu | Kanal D | 30 July 2018 | |
| Russia | Такси; Taxi | Alex Kulichkov; Eugene Rybov | TNT | 20 December 2005 | |
| Serbia | Кеш такси Keš taksi | Ivan Ivanović | Fox televizija | 12 January 2007 | 26 June 2010 |
| Serbia | Keš taxi | Miloš Biković; Milan Marić | Blic TV | 6 October 2023 | |
| Slovakia | Taxík | Peter Kočiš | Jednotka | 21 January 2012 | |
| Slovakia | IQ Taxi | Mário "Kuly" Kollár | TV JOJ | 6 January 2019 | |
| Slovenia | Taksi: Kviz z Jožetom | Jože Robežnik | RTV SLO | 2016 | |
| Spain | Taxi, taxi | Joan Domínguez | Telemadrid | 31 July 2006 | 2007 |
| Spain | ¡Taxi! | Manolo Sarriá | Canal Sur 2 | 18 January 2010 | 2012 |
| Spain | Taxi | Miki Nadal and Manolo Sarriá | laSexta | 13 May 2013 | 28 June 2013 |
| Sweden | | Fredrik Belfrage | Discovery Channel | | |
| Taiwan | 黃金計程車; Gold Taxi | David Chao; Vincent Liang; Gui Gui | ECT | 22 April 2009 | |
| Thailand | แท็กซีมหาเศรษฐี Cash Cab Thailand | Ball Chernyim; Jeab Chernyim; Passakorn Ponlaboon | Modernine TV | 2 March 2015 | |
| Ukraine | Таксі; Taxi | Gregory Herman | 1+1 | 2006 | 2008 |
| United Kingdom | Cash Cab | John Moody | ITV | 13 June 2005 | 30 March 2007 |
| United Kingdom | Cash Cab | John Moody | Challenge | 13 June 2005 | 30 March 2007 |
| United States | Cash Cab | Ben Bailey | Discovery Channel | 5 December 2005 | 26 August 2020 |
| United States | Cash Cab | Ben Bailey | Bravo | 5 December 2005 | 26 August 2020 |
| United States | Cash Cab: Chicago | Beth Melewski | Discovery Channel | 14 February 2011 | 30 December 2011 |
| United States | Cash Cab Music | Adam Growe | AXS TV | 8 January 2024 | |
| Vietnam | Taxi May Mắn | Hiếu Hiền | HTV7 | 19 October 2012 | 5 April 2013 |
| Vietnam | Cash Cab - Xe kỳ thú | Lê Hương | VTV8 | 30 October 2021 | |

== See also ==
- Taxicab Confessions
- BrainRush
