= When It Rains, It Pours (30 Rock) =

- 30 Rock episode
- Episode no.: Season 5 Episode 2
- Directed by: Don Scardino
- Written by: Robert Carlock
- Production code: 502
- Original air date: September 30, 2010

Guest appearances
- Mike Carlsen as Mikey Politano; Joanna P. Adler as Donna; Ben Bailey as himself; Elizabeth Banks as Avery Jessup; Craig Castaldo as Moonvest; Paul Giamatti as Ritchie; Andrea Mitchell as herself; Chris Parnell as Dr. Leo Spaceman; Sherri Shepherd as Angie Jordan; Brian Williams as himself

Episode chronology
← Previous "The Fabian Strategy"	Next → "Let's Stay Together"
- 30 Rock season 5

"When It Rains, It Pours" is the second episode of the fifth season of the American television comedy series 30 Rock, and the 82nd overall episode of the series. It was written by co-show runner and executive producer Robert Carlock and directed by series producer Don Scardino. "When It Rains, It Pours" originally aired on NBC in the United States on September 30, 2010. Guest stars in this episode include Joanna Adler, Ben Bailey, Elizabeth Banks, Craig Castaldo, Paul Giamatti, Andrea Mitchell, Chris Parnell, Sherri Shepherd, and Brian Williams.

In the episode, Liz Lemon (Tina Fey) uses her newfound confidence of men noticing her to solve Pete Hornberger's (Scott Adsit) problem with a difficult television editor named Ritchie (Paul Giamatti). Meanwhile, Jack Donaghy (Alec Baldwin) decides to teach his unborn child with his girlfriend Avery Jessup (Elizabeth Banks) how to live. Elsewhere, Tracy Jordan (Tracy Morgan) is determined to be with his wife Angie Jordan (Sherri Shepherd) when she gives birth, and a mysterious individual is making sure Kenneth Parcell's (Jack McBrayer) page duties at the fictitious show The Girlie Show with Tracy Jordan (TGS) at NBC are still getting done.

"When It Rains, It Pours" received generally positive reviews from television critics. According to the Nielsen Media Research, the episode was watched by 5.688 million households during its original broadcast, and received a 2.6 rating/8 share among viewers in the 18–49 demographic. For his work in the episode, Robert Carlock won the Writers Guild of America Award for Episodic Comedy.

The beginning of this episode features a construction worker played by Mike Carlsen, who was later retconned into being Carlsen's character Mikey Politano from Fey and Carlock's later show Unbreakable Kimmy Schmidt.

== Plot ==
Liz Lemon (Tina Fey) is surprised that men have been noticing her, instead of resenting or ignoring her as they usually do. Her friend Jenna Maroney (Jane Krakowski) tells Liz that she is coming off as more confident since starting her relationship with her boyfriend Carol (Matt Damon). Liz decides to use her new-found confidence to help TGS with Tracy Jordan producer Pete Hornberger (Scott Adsit) with a problem he has had with a difficult television editor named Ritchie (Paul Giamatti). Liz visits him in the editing room and hopes to convince him to get TGS's show's opener footage finished as soon as possible in which she is successful after flirting with Ritchie. Later, Liz learns that Ritchie is spreading a rumor that the two are sleeping together. She confronts Ritchie about it, he admits to starting the rumor in order to get the attention of his assistant editor Donna (Joanna Adler). Later, Liz and Ritchie have a pretend break-up in front of Donna, and Donna becomes interested in Ritchie.

Meanwhile, Jack Donaghy (Alec Baldwin) and his girlfriend CNBC host Avery Jessup (Elizabeth Banks) tell Liz that they are expecting a son. Liz congratulates them and tells the two that their son will have an old dad as Jack is in his early 50s. As a result of what Liz said, Jack fears that he will not be around so he decides to teach his unborn son how to live by recording a video containing advice for him. Later, Jack learns that he and Avery are in fact expecting a daughter and not a son. Jack realizes that he needs to make new tapes and in the tape he says to his unborn daughter "If you have the blondeness and self-esteem of your mother, you will need no advice."

At the same time, Tracy Jordan's (Tracy Morgan) wife, Angie Jordan (Sherri Shepherd), is going into labor. Tracy, who after missing the birth of his sons does not want to miss the birth of his daughter, has Grizz Griswold (Grizz Chapman) and "Dot Com" Slattery (Kevin Brown) guard him in his dressing room in the 30 Rock building so that he would not wander off. A fire drill occurs so everyone must exit the building. Outside, however, the two lose track of Tracy, who wanders around the city. He hails a cab to get to the hospital Angie is at, but realizes that he does not have money on him, however, the driver does not mind. Once inside the cab, the driver, Ben Bailey—the host of the game show Cash Cab—informs Tracy that he is a contestant. As part of the game, Tracy must answer questions to win money and reach his destination. As a result, Tracy answers all the questions correctly and arrives at the hospital in time to witness the birth of his daughter.

In addition, Liz and Jenna are surprised how smoothly everything is running in the TGS set without Kenneth Parcell (Jack McBrayer), a former NBC page. Unbeknownst to everyone, there is a "mystery man" going around TGS in a black cape completing all of the tasks that Kenneth would do. While Jack is recording a video, he catches Kenneth in his office, revealing that Kenneth has been the one completing all of his old tasks. Kenneth says that he is there because he knows how much he is needed, but Jack tells him that they do not need him and he must move on with his life. Hurt and bewildered, Kenneth leaves, and Jack says in the video for his unborn child that the exchange between him and Kenneth was really "tough love" and he had just sent Kenneth on a journey. Later, Kenneth gets a phone call from Angie, who is delirious on pain killers. At the same time, as Tracy is on the game show, Angie tells Kenneth to find Tracy. Unable to do so, Kenneth takes a cardboard cut-out of Tracy and pretends to be him as she is giving birth until Tracy comes in and pushes Kenneth out of the way. Later, Jack tells Kenneth that he is truly needed back at TGS and offers to talk to human resources to get his job back, but Kenneth refuses and says he will re-apply to the page program, following the proper procedures.

== Production ==
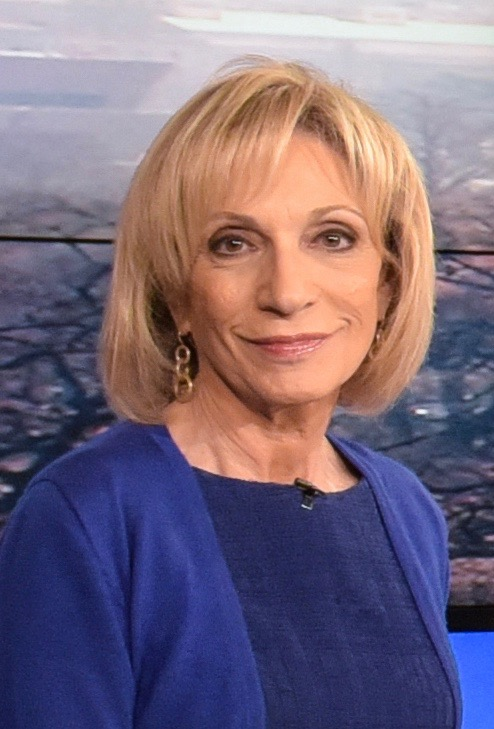
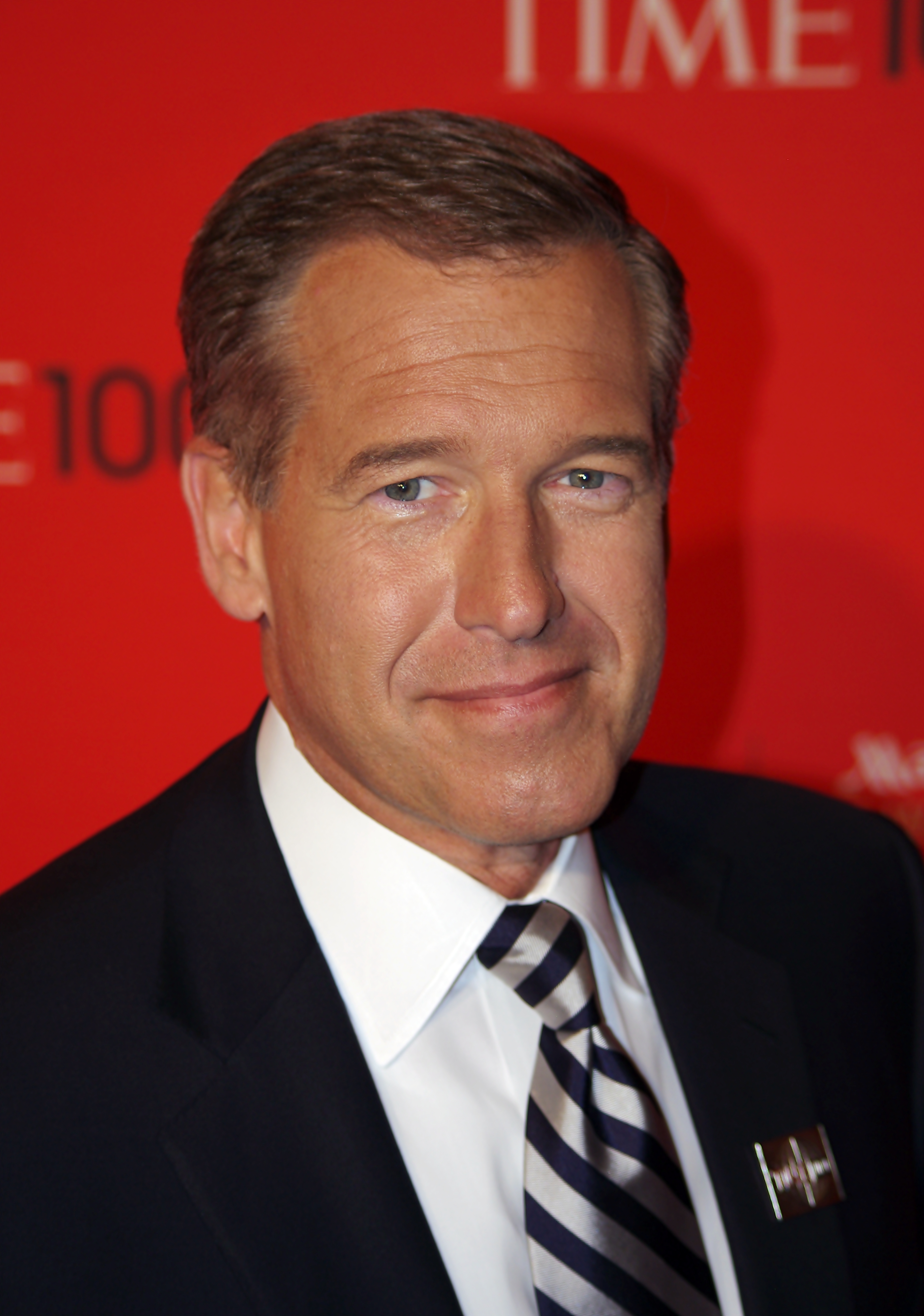
Andrea Mitchell (left) and Brian Williams (right) played themselves in this episode of 30 Rock.

This episode of 30 Rock was written by co-show runner and executive producer Robert Carlock and directed by series producer Don Scardino. This was Carlock's sixteenth writing credit, and Scardino's twenty-eighth directed episode. "When It Rains, It Pours" originally aired in the United States on September 30, 2010, on NBC as the second episode of the show's fifth season and the 82nd overall episode of the series. This episode of 30 Rock was filmed on August 30, August 31, September 2, September 5, and September 8, 2010.

In August 2010, series creator, executive producer and lead actress Tina Fey revealed to Entertainment Weekly correspondent Michael Ausiello that actor Paul Giamatti would guest star in the upcoming season playing a "grouchy" television editor named Ritchie. Actress Elizabeth Banks returned as her 30 Rock character Avery Jessup, a CNBC television host and Jack Donaghy's girlfriend, in this episode, and reprised the Avery role for the eighth time. Comedian actress Sherri Shepherd reprised her role as Angie Jordan, the wife of Tracy Jordan, for the seventh time. Comedian actor Chris Parnell, who played Dr. Leo Spaceman, the doctor who assisted in the birth of Angie and Tracy's daughter in the episode, has appeared in the main cast of Saturday Night Live (SNL), a weekly sketch comedy series which airs on NBC in the United States. Tina Fey was the head writer on SNL from 1999 until 2006.

News anchors Brian Williams and Andrea Mitchell played themselves in the episode in which the two tease the Liz Lemon character of her supposed relationship with Giamatti's Ritchie. This was Williams' fourth appearance on the show, having appeared in the episodes "The Ones", "Audition Day", and "Future Husband", and Mitchell's first appearance on 30 Rock. Ben Bailey, the game show host of the Discovery Channel program Cash Cab played himself. In the beginning of the episode, several men hit on Liz, which surprises her, and one of those men who hits on her was credited as "Moonvest" and was played by Craig Castaldo, or known as Radio Man. Castaldo has made numerous appearances on the program.

== Reception ==
In its original American broadcast, "When It Rains, It Pours" drew in 5.688 million households, according to the Nielsen Media Research. The show claimed a 2.6 rating/8 share among viewers in the 18–49 demographic. This means that it was seen by 2.6 percent of all 18- to 49-year-olds, and 8 percent of all 18- to 49-year-olds watching television at the time of the broadcast. The rating/share was the same number as the previous week's season premiere episode, "The Fabian Strategy"; in the week that "When It Rains, It Pours" originally aired, 30 Rock was the only Thursday program whose ratings did not fall from its season premiere. In February 2011, Robert Carlock won the Writers Guild of America Award for Episodic Comedy for his work in this episode of 30 Rock.

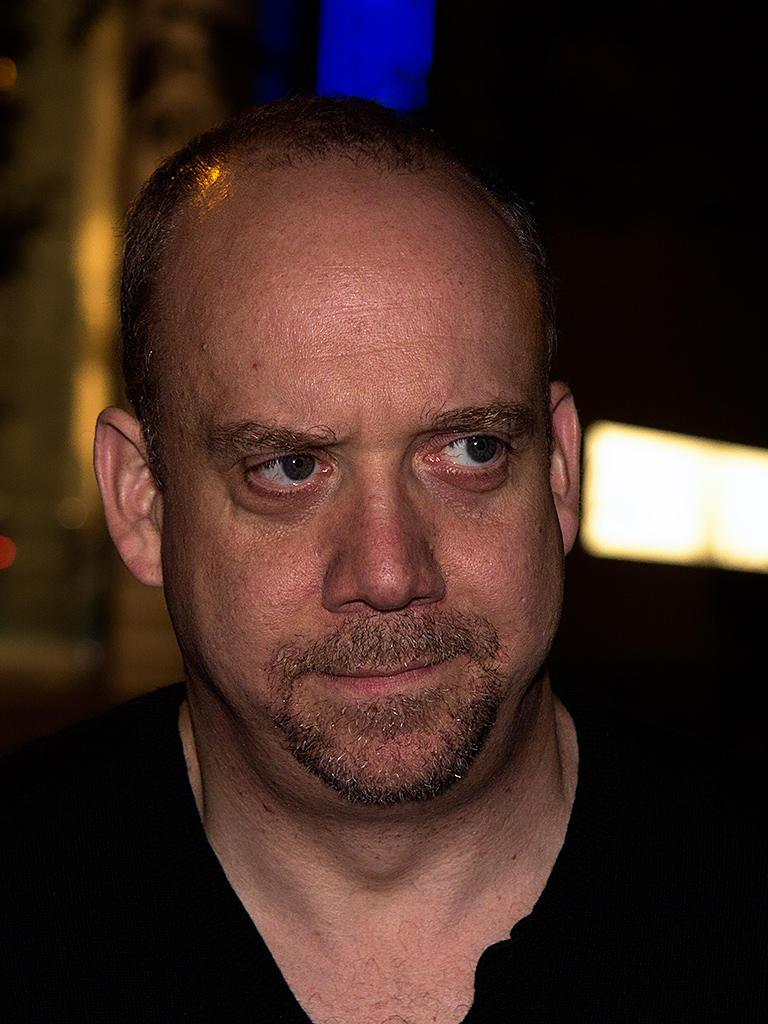
Paul Giamatti's appearance on the show was appreciated by critics.

Television columnist Alan Sepiwall for HitFix called this the best overall episode since season four's December 2009 episode "Dealbreakers Talk Show #0001". He wrote that the episode had "some incredibly funny jokes", but noted that the "most hilarious moments" from "When It Rains, It Pours" came from the main characters themselves. Sepinwall enjoyed Jack's videos to his unborn son, noting it was "...the [Jack] I know and love best: supremely confident and ... oblivious to his own insanity." Nathan Rabin of The A.V. Club liked that the series had moved on from making the Liz character "asexual and vaguely repellent" for men. In his recap, Rabin much enjoyed the episode and said "If the rest of the season is as good as the first two episodes, we could have a big-time comeback on our hands." Juli Weiner of Vanity Fair wrote that Paul Giamatti was a delight as his 30 Rock character. Entertainment Weekly contributor Annie Barrett was thrilled that the Tracy character was a contestant on Cash Cab, noting once the game began "everything felt so right". Samantha Urban of The Dallas Morning News preferred "When It Rains, It Pours" to the episodes of Community and The Office, which aired on NBC the same night. Brad Sanders of the Indiana Daily Student wrote that Giamatti played his part brilliantly, and that his involvement in the main plot was "well-written, well-organized, and by far the best thing about the episode".

Bob Sassone of AOL's TV Squad commented that Giamatti "seems like he could be an editor at NBC, so the guest role didn't irritate or grate". Sassone enjoyed Kenneth and Tracy's stories here, and was glad that Jack and Avery have remained a couple. Verne Gay of Newsday noted that this episode of 30 Rock was a "spectacular piece of television, and comedy writing, and acting". Scott Eidler of The Cornell Daily Sun called Tracy's plot "very believable", and opined that "any reservations I have had about this show being less than completely real are gone" after watching this episode. Meredith Blake of the Los Angeles Times deemed this a stellar episode, explaining that the Tracy, Liz, and Jack characters had storylines that allowed them "to strut their comedic stuff". Time contributor James Poniewozik reported that "When It Rains, It Pours" was a very good episode. He noted that Jack's storyline was the "simplest recipe for comedy: just turn on a camera and let Alec Baldwin be hilarious. But it came within the story of his accepting having a [child] assessing his mortality, and trying to distill what matters in his life". Poniewozik was positive towards Liz's plot with Giamatti, reporting that her plot "involved one of the best guest roles in a sometimes too guest-heavy role" and enjoyed the traits from Giamatti's Ritchie.
