= Taxi Payant =

Canadian television game show

- Genre: Game show
- Presented by: Alexandre Barrette
- Country of origin: Canada
- No. of series: 4

Production
- Running time: 30mins (inc. comms)
- Production company: Castlewood Productions

Original release
- Network: V
- Release: September 3, 2009 – 2018

Related
- Cash Cab

Taxi Payant is a Canadian television game show. It began airing on September 3, 2009, on V, and is hosted by Alexandre Barrette. It airs in Quebec instead of the American version of the series, which is seen on the U.S. Discovery Channel cable network and on local U.S. stations in syndication. Taxi Payant is the French version of the Cash Cab franchise available in Canada. There is an English Canadian version as well, also called Cash Cab, which airs on the Canadian Discovery Channel.

== Gameplay ==
The rules of the game are identical to its English Canadian counterpart; however, the questions in Cash Cab tend to be more scientific-related while Taxi Payant's questions can be about virtually any topic, from geography to sports to pop culture to even general trivia about the city of Montreal, Quebec, where the show is filmed in. On numerous episodes, Barrette is even seen outside the cab, asking general knowledge questions to strangers on the street for an easy $10.
