= Zhong Hua Hao Shi Ci =

- 中华好诗词
- Genre: Game show
- Directed by: Yang Baokun
- Presented by: Wang Kai
- Country of origin: China
- Original language: Chinese
- No. of seasons: 4

Production
- Running time: 80-120 minutes

Original release
- Network: Hebei TV
- Release: 19 October 2013 – present

Zhong Hua Hao Shi Ci (Pinyin, Simplified Chinese: 中华好诗词, directly in English 'The good poetry of China') is one of the Chinese adaptations of the Israeli game show La'uf al HaMillion, which aired on Hebei TV Network on 22:00 every Saturday (UTC+8).

The show has some different features from the original version and the American version Who's Still Standing.

== Format (Season 1 Episodes 1 to 11) ==
There are three rounds in the show.

=== Round One ===
100 contestants play in the hot-seat round. The first one to get the right to answer the question asked by the Host is in the game. If a correct answer is given, he or she will go on the stage.

=== Round Two ===
The contestant selected from the crowd plays head-to-head against each of the 6 celebrity contestants. The game is similar to the original version, but the clock is removed. They are asked questions in turns, and the questions are as follows:

- The Missing Next Line-- The host asks a sentence from an ancient Chinese poem, but there is one line missing. The contestant must recite the missing line.

Example: When the host says "本是同根生"(This is the same root, originally by Cao Zhi's "七步诗", A Poem in Seven Steps), the contestant must recite "相煎何太急"(Why do you want to kill me?) for the next missing line.

- Multiple Choice Questions.

The head-to-head contest ends when a person fails to answer a question correctly or to run out of time. The loser will be dropped under the stage. Usually the host says "后会有期" (farewell), and the eliminated contestant's trapdoor immediately opens and he or she is dropped through the floor.

Each elimination of the celebrity contestants is worth ¥2,000 (~$300).

After 2 celebrity contestants have been eliminated, the contestant has an opportunity to walk away from the game. If the contestant fails to win the next round, half of the prize money is lost. If he or she is eliminated in the first two rounds, there is no prize for the contestant.

=== Round Three ===
After eliminating 6 celebrities, the contestant is given a chance to walk away or advance to the third round. In the third round, the contestant is tested by the so called Grand Secretaries (c: 大学士), who are guest experts in literature or language. The guests asks the contestant 5 questions about Chinese poetry where the contestant must answer the missing two lines or the missing sentence for each poem.

If the contestant answers correctly, ¥30,000(~$4,700) is awarded. All the contestants who makes it to the third round proceeds to the finale.

== The Repechage (Season 1 Episode 12) ==
In this episode, the game is played in two rounds.

- Round 1: Six contestants answer the questions in turns. Failure to answer a question correctly, he or she will be eliminated and dropped down the stage. If there are only two left, the game ends and they are proceeded to the next round.
- Round 2: Six winners of round one play the grab questions. Answering incorrectly, he or she can not play the question. The person who has the least right answers will be eliminated.

== The Semifinal (Season 1 Episode 13) ==
This episode is played in two rounds.

- Round 1: Contestants answer in turns. They must answer the line in the poem with the allowed words(animals, colors, the character "花", etc.). If a contestant could not in play in this round. An correct answer worth 1 point.
- Round 2: This round is the same as Round 2 in general episodes. The person ranked last in last round will pick the competitor. Winning in this round will get 5 points.

The top six will be proceeded to the finale(the final of this season).

== Top Prize Winners ==
There are only two top prize winner in Episodes 3 and 5.
