= Ivana Andrlová =

Czech actress (born 1960)

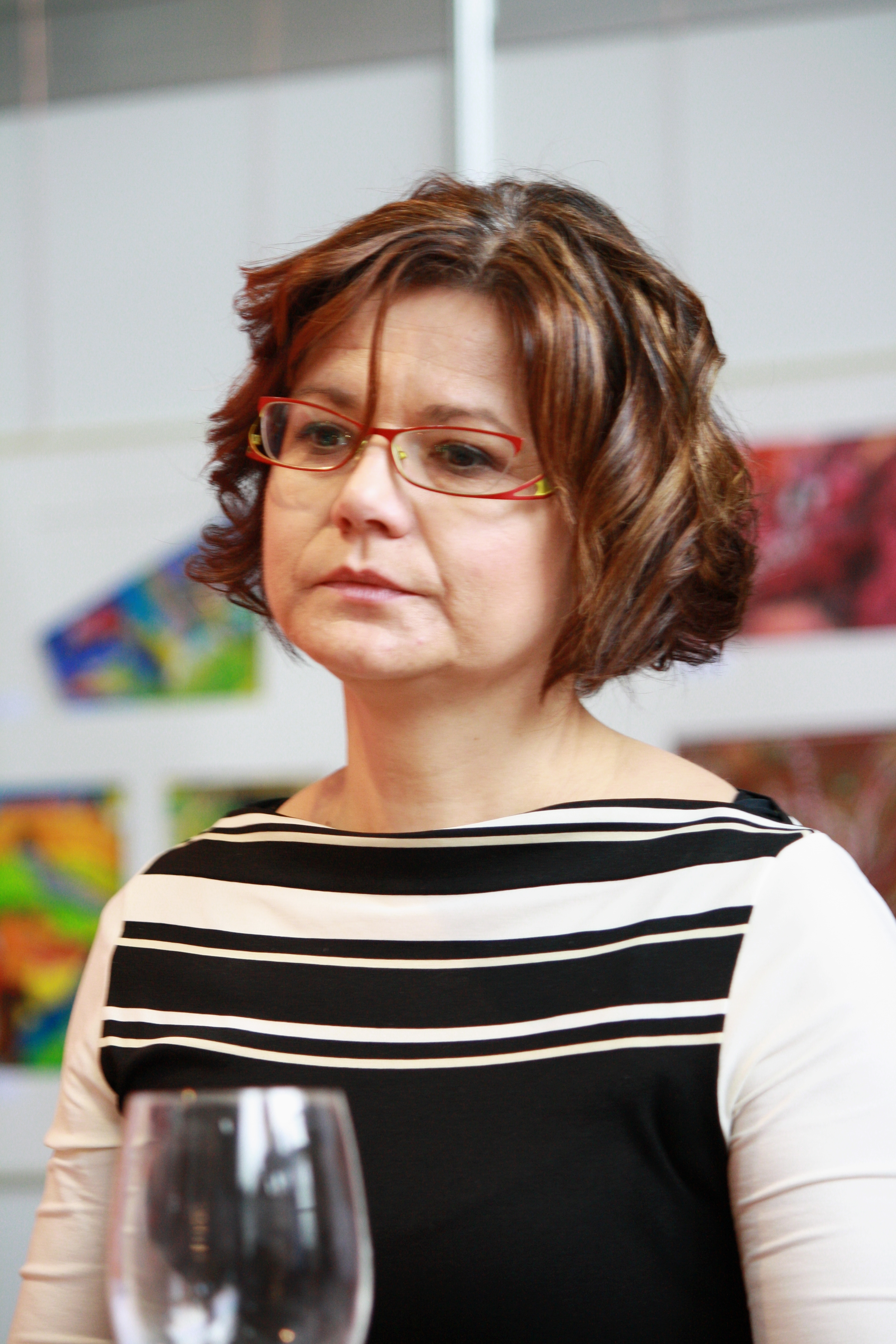
- Andrlová in 2010
- Born: 8 October 1960 (age 65); Vysoké Mýto, Czechoslovakia
- Occupations: Actress, voice actress
- Years active: 1976–present
- Spouse: Ivan Vyskočil (m. 1981–1996)

Ivana Andrlová (born 28 October 1960) is a Czech actress and voice actress. She became popular in the 1980s, when she was among the most frequently cast Czech film actresses.

== Life and family ==
Andrlová was born in the hospital in Vysoké Mýto on 28 October 1960, but is a native of the nearby town of Choceň, where her family lived. Her mother was a teacher and her father was a toolmaker.

She was married with actor Ivan Vyskočil in 1981–1996. They have a daughter, Michaela. She never remarried after that.

== Education and career ==
Andrlová debuted at the age of 15 in the TV film Podnájemníci (1976, directed by František Filip), shot when she was still in primary school. She then studied at the Prague Conservatory in Prague. After completing her studies, she joined the Jiří Wolker Theatre (in the premises of today's Theatre in Dlouhá Street). After the theatre was closed, she began to act freelance and collaborate with various theatre companies.

In the 1980s, Andrlová was among the most frequently cast Czech film actresses. She often played princesses in fairy tale films during this period.

Andrlová also works as a voice actor. In 2001, she received the František Filipovský Award (the most prestigious Czech award for voice acting) for her dubbing of Ally McBeal in the TV series Ally McBeal.

=== Selected filmography ===
- The Prince and the Evening Star (1978)
- Thirty Cases of Major Zeman (TV series, 1978–1979)
- Visitors from the Arkana Galaxy (1981)
- Vítr v kapse (1982)
- Létající Čestmír (TV series, 1984)
- Sanitka (TV series, 1984)
- Young Wine (1986)
- Chlapci a chlapi (TV series, 1988)
- Stopy života (TV series, 2013–2015)
- Přístav (TV series, 2015–2017)
- Ulice (TV series, 2024–)
- Moloch (TV series, 2025)
