= Daniel Kopál =

Czech chef, radio and television presenter, and author (1970–2020)

Daniel Kopál (10 December 1970 – 27 October 2020) was a Czech chef, radio and television presenter and author of cookbooks.

Kopál acted as radio host for Hitrádio Faktor. Together with Martin Zounar he directed the cooking program Mňam aneb Prima vařečka. He also worked for regional television for Výlety s labužníkem. He published a number of cookbooks on South Bohemian cuisine, of which he was a specialist.

Kopál lived and worked in České Budějovice.

In October 2020, Kopál was infected by SARS-CoV-2 during the COVID-19 pandemic in the Czech Republic. After a long stay in the intensive care unit, he died from COVID-19 on 27 October 2020, at age 49.
