= Mistletoe Murders =

2024 Canadian TV series

- Genre: Mystery
- Created by: Ken Cuperus
- Based on: Mistletoe Murders by Ken Cuperus
- Starring: Sarah Drew; Peter Mooney; Sierra Marilyn Riley; Lara Amersey; Kylee Evans; David Hewlett; Jake Epstein; Jean Yoon
- Narrated by: Sarah Drew
- Countries of origin: Canada; United States
- Original language: English
- No. of seasons: 3
- No. of episodes: 15

Production
- Executive producers: Sarah Drew; Ken Cuperus; Michelle Melanson; Jocelyn Hamilton
- Production location: Toronto, Ontario
- Cinematography: Justin Black; Gregor Hagey
- Running time: 42 minutes
- Production companies: Audible Originals; Headspinner Productions; Lionsgate Canada

Original release
- Network: Hallmark+; Hallmark Channel
- Release: October 31, 2024 – present

Mistletoe Murders is a Hallmark mystery television series based on the Audible series of the same name by Ken Cuperus. The series, starring Sarah Drew and Peter Mooney, premiered on October 31, 2024. In February 2026, the series was renewed for a third season, which premiered on November 5, 2026.

== Premise ==
Emily Lane, a mysterious woman, moves to the small town of Fletcher's Grove in Upstate New York and buys a year-round Christmas shop. After a series of murders strike the town, Emily is forced to face her past as she begins investigating the crimes, despite the objections of local detective, Sam Wilner.

== Cast ==
=== Main cast ===
- Sarah Drew as Emily Lane
  - Quincy Kirkwood as Young Emily Lane
- Peter Mooney as Sam Wilner
- Sierra Marilyn Riley as Violet Wilner
- Lara Amersey as June Hubble
- Kylee Evans as Brooke Carmichael
- David Hewlett as Mayor Ray Pemberton
- Jake Epstein as Noah Johnson
- Jean Yoon as Sue Shin

=== Recurring cast ===
- Kolton Stewart as Kyle Granger
- Elena Juatco as Ms. Cambridge
- Aaron Ashmore as Aaron
  - Evan Hasler as Young Aaron
- Olunike Adeliyi as Janet Chase
- Brendan Morgan as Thomas Chase

=== Guest stars ===
Prominent guest stars in Mistletoe Murders include: Tom Cavanagh, Raven Dauda, Steve Lund, Neil Crone, Arlene Duncan, Benjamin Ayres, Jamie Thomas King, Tommie-Amber Pirie, Alex House, Sebastian Spence, and Catherine Bell.

== Production ==
Mistletoe Murders is filmed in and around surrounding areas of Toronto, Ontario. Season one began filming in June 2024. The fictional town of Fletcher's Grove is named after the popular character Jessica Fletcher from Murder, She Wrote.

In March 2025, the series was renewed for a second season. Season two began filming on March 31, 2025, and concluded on May 29, 2025. In February 2026, the series was renewed for a third season. Filming for season three began on May 14, 2026, and concluded on July 11, 2026.

== Episodes ==
Season	Episodes	Originally released	
Season	Episodes	First released	Last released
1	6	October 31, 2024	December 5, 2024
2	6	November 7, 2025	November 21, 2025
3	6	November 5, 2026	December 10, 2026

=== Season 1 (2024) ===
No. overall	No. in season	Title	Directed by	Written by	Original release date
1	1	"Poison in a Pear Tree - Part 1"	Grant Harvey	Ken Cuperus	October 31, 2024
2	2	"Poison in a Pear Tree - Part 2"	Grant Harvey	Ken Cuperus	November 7, 2024
3	3	"Peril of the Belles - Part 1"	Sherry White	Michelle Ricci	November 14, 2024
4	4	"Peril of the Belles - Part 2"	Sherry White	Michelle Ricci	November 21, 2024
5	5	"Death of a Humbug - Part 1"	Melanie Orr	Shelley Scarrow	November 28, 2024
6	6	"Death of a Humbug - Part 2"	Melanie Orr	Shelley Scarrow	December 5, 2024

=== Season 2 (2025) ===
No. overall	No. in season	Title	Directed by	Written by	Original release date	U.S. viewers (millions)
7	1	"Cold War - Part 1"	Melanie Orr	Ken Cuperus	November 7, 2025	0.77
8	2	"Cold War - Part 2"	Melanie Orr	Ken Cuperus	November 7, 2025	0.76
9	3	"The Ides of December - Part 1"	James Genn	Jessie Gabe	November 14, 2025	0.93
10	4	"The Ides of December - Part 2"	James Genn	Shelley Scarrow	November 14, 2025	0.91
11	5	"'Twas the Fight Before Christmas - Part 1"	Melanie Orr	Michelle Ricci	November 21, 2025	0.98
12	6	"'Twas the Fight Before Christmas - Part 2"	Melanie Orr	Michelle Ricci	November 21, 2025	0.92

=== Season 3 (2026) ===
No. overall	No. in season	Title	Directed by	Written by	Original release date	U.S. viewers (millions)
13	1	"Don't Fear the Wreather - Part 1"	Melanie Orr	Ken Cuperus	November 5, 2026	0.81
14	2	"Don't Fear the Wreather - Part 2"	Melanie Orr	Ken Cuperus	November 12, 2026	TBD
15	3	"We Three Kims - Part 1"	James Genn	Michelle Ricci	November 19, 2026	TBD
16	4	"We Three Kims - Part 2"	TBA	TBA	November 26, 2026	TBD
17	5	"A Mystery on 34th Street - Part 1"	TBA	TBA	December 3, 2026	TBD
18	6	"A Mystery on 34th Street - Part 2"	TBA	TBA	December 10, 2026	TBD

== Release ==
Mistletoe Murders premiered on Hallmark+ on October 31, 2024. Season one then made its linear debut on Hallmark Channel on October 17, 2025.

From season two, episodes first-run on Hallmark Channel before releasing on Hallmark+ the next day. The series began streaming on Netflix in the United States on November 1, 2026.
