= Hebei Television =

Television network in China

Hebei Television (HEBTV)
- Type: Broadcast; state media
- Country: People's Republic of China
- Official website: www.hebtv.com

Hebei Television (HEBTV) (simplified Chinese: 河北电视台; traditional Chinese: 河北電視台; pinyin: Héběi Diànshìtái) is a state-owned television network in Hebei province and all parts of the Beijing and Tianjin television viewing areas. Hebei Television also covers parts of Shandong, Henan and Shaanxi provinces and the Inner Mongolia Autonomous Region.

As of 2006 Hebei Television has two channels, broadcasting 136 hours of programs and rebroadcasts programs from two other television stations. HEBTV also broadcasts 2 hours of programs to North America each month via the Oriental Satellite Television.

== Channels ==
- HEBTV-1- A comprehensive channel, which broadcasts news, programs in the arts, movies and plays
  - Its major programs are Hebei News Broadcast (Hebei Xinwen Lianbo), Economy Watch (Jingji Guancha), Society Focus (Shehui Shidian), Movie World (Dianying Da Shijie) and Sports Circle (Titan Neiwai).
- HEBTV-2- Focuses on the economy
  - It broadcasts major programs such as Economy Watch (Jingji Guancha), Economy Express (Jingji Chuanzhen), Securities Today (Jinri Zhengquan) and Economy Life (Jingji Shenghuo).
- HEBTV-3 (HEBTV-都市) – City
  - Major programs: City Life (Dushi Shenghuo), Sports News (Tiyu Xinwen)
- HEBTV-4 (HEBTV-影视) – Movie & Television
  - Major Programs: Circulation of Entertainment (Ying shi quan), Movie World (Ying shi da shi jie), Movie & TV Dictionary (Ying shi bao dian)
- HEBTV-5 (HEBTV-少儿科教) – Children & Education
  - Major Programs: Military Files (Jun shi dang an), Growing (Cheng zhang), Children World (Shao er tian di), SF Movie Review (Kehuan yingshi shangxi)
- HEBTV-6 (HEBTV-公共) – Public
  - Major Programs: Happy 50 mins (Kuaile 50 fen), Law Time (Fazhi tian di), Chatroom (Liao tian shi)
- HEBTV-Farmer (HEBTV-农民) – Farmer & Agriculture
  - Major Programs: San nong zui qian xian

The television station has three studios. Both the 800-square-meter and 400-square-meter studios are equipped with digital devices.

== Programs ==
- Let's Go Together
- Perhaps Love
- Zhong Hua Hao Shi Ci

Couple List

Season 3 (2016)

- Heechul of Super Junior & Li Feier
