= Monster Warriors =

- Created by: Wilson Coneybeare
- Starring: Jared Keeso; Mandy Butcher; Lara Amersey; Yani Gellman; Seán Cullen; Allan Royal; Adam Growe; Mike 'Nug' Nahrgang
- Country of origin: Canada
- No. of seasons: 2
- No. of episodes: 52

Production
- Production locations: Barrie, Ontario, Canada
- Camera setup: Single-camera
- Running time: 25 minutes
- Production companies: Coneybeare Stories; Bejuba! Entertainment

Original release
- Network: YTV
- Release: March 18, 2006 – July 26, 2008

Monster Warriors is a Canadian television series that aired on YTV in Canada and also on Jetix since April 2006 in the United Kingdom. It was created by Wilson Coneybeare and produced by Coneybeare Stories and distributed by Bejuba! Entertainment. The series concluded its run on July 26, 2008, with a television film titled Monster Warriors Finale on YTV.

== Plot ==
=== Season 1 ===
The series, a purposely campy cross between the Power Rangers, Scooby-Doo and Ghostbusters, follows the adventures of four teenagers fighting to safeguard Capital City from the vengeful wrath of insane and disgruntled old B-Movie director Klaus Von Steinhauer who possesses the ability to bring his cinematic monsters to life. Over the course of the series, various story arcs occur that expand the series' cast and city locations. Each week sees the teens customize common household objects into useful weapons to fight against monstrous creations.

=== Season 2 ===
In the second season, the battle continues as the Monster Warriors work from their new hideout: a deserted secret bomb shelter beneath Luke's house. The newly outfitted warriors get caught in the battle between Von Steinhauer and the new Mystery Monster Maker. The new monsters are half animal, half machine.

== Characters ==
=== Core characters ===
- Luke is the reserved yet tough leader of the Warriors. He is rich, tall and handsome and holds the keys to the group's sweet purple convertible and their headquarters at his home. He is Tabby's love interest. Although he acts tough most of the time, he still has certain fears, particularly of forests. His family fortune comes from his environmental activist parents' invention of coin deposit locks on shopping carts. He is a combination of Fred Jones, Peter Venkman, and Tommy Oliver.
- Antonio is the darkly handsome scientific genius of the gang. As a recent immigrant to Capital City, he devoted his considerable intellectual abilities to learning to speak English without any trace of a foreign accent, and he has a vast knowledge of fields like zoology, astronomy, geology and history. Although he is shy and kind of nerdy, he still has many female admirers. He is a combination of Shaggy Rogers, Egon Spengler, and Rocky DeSantos.
- Tabby is a blond 17-year-old girl, who is the second in command of the group and is Luke's love interest. She is an ace inventor who can turn ordinary household gadgets into monster-blasting weaponry. She is also the captain of the volleyball team and school class president and is an all-around goody two-shoes, although she does not like being called one. She is a combination of Velma Dinkley, Janine Melnitz, and Trini Kwan.
- Vanka is the bravest of the Warriors and a dedicated practitioner of obscure martial arts. Tough, fierce and virtually fearless, the athletic brunette is, however, particularly uncomfortable with heights, has failed her driving test multiple times and has had a string of hopeless boyfriends. She later develops a relationship with Antonio. She is a combination of Daphne Blake, Kylie Griffin, and Kimberly Hart.

=== Other recurring characters ===
- Klaus Von Steinhauer is a monster movie director turned mad monster-maker. He is an evil version of Gozer and Lord Zedd.
- Missy Gore is a perky, narcoleptic city power company worker turned villainous sidekick in Season 1. Although she developed feelings for the much older Klaus, in Season 2 she left for dentistry school.
- Mayor Mel is a Mayor of Capital City. As a former actor in Von Steinhauer movies and a pool salesman, he has a never-ending faith in the Monster Warriors.
- Henry is a young boy who sends messages from the future and is the leader of the future Capital City Rebellion.
- Kreeger is a big, bearded monster movie expert and owner of the Monster Video movie rentals/comics and collectibles shop.
- Superintendent George McClellan is a Mayor Mel's ambitious and incompetent adviser who constantly suspects teenagers for all wrongdoing in Capital City. He becomes mayor in the second season but resigns and goes back to being superintendent. He is always on the phone or yelling.
- Dink Doorman is a news reporter whose stories often revolve around the Monster Warriors and their battles and also hosts a call-in movie show called "The Big Money Movie". He apparently does not know the meaning of the word "incredulous", often using it instead of "incredible".
- Fire Chief Holswade is Tabby's father and the fire department chief.
- Eustace McCafferty is a nerdy high school student and a member of the school science club and astronomy club.

=== Cast ===
- Jared Keeso – Luke
- Lara Amersey – Vanka
- Mandy Butcher – Tabby
- Yani Gellman – Antonio
- Seán Cullen – Klaus Von Steinhauer
- Glenn Coulson – Dink Dorman
- Mike 'Nug' Nahrgang – Kreeger
- Adam Growe – Superintendent McClellan
- Ely Henry as Eustace

=== New characters in Season 2 ===
- Mystery Monster Maker is an unsuspected citizen of Capital City and the aliens' new agent who wants to create more dangerous monsters.
- Lucy is a brilliant and, as Antonio puts it, cute girl that Luke meets at the hockey rink.
- George Junior is a superintendent McClellan's son who is later revealed to be the Mystery Monster Maker.
- Dana the Diner Waitress is a happy-go-lucky, no-nonsense girl who works at the local diner and the local tech support company.
- General Grabjaw is the leader of the aliens.

== Monsters ==
- Mysterious aliens are an unknown race of colourful bald, big-headed aliens, who secretly control those who create the monsters. They can take human form, and their plan is to destroy Capital City, though the reason is unknown.
- Giant Spiders are the first of the monsters that the warriors battle.
- Kraken is a giant squid that destroys the harbour day in the city and sucks one of the Warriors in.
- Giant Alligators are found in the sewers.
- 60-foot Bumblebee tried to drain Capital City's power supply.
- Skeleton Crew is a small tactical strike team of living green skeletons that tried to poison Capital City's water.
- T. Rex is found in a carnival.
- Giant Anaconda is found in the North Woods.
- Alien Zombie from the Planet Zeenom was created by accident when Klaus' Monster Machine broke and zapped Missy's comic book. This intelligent and benevolent giant monster is featured in seasons 1 and 2.
- Pterodactyl is a monster that is featured in seasons 1 and 2.
- Praying Mantis is a monster that is featured in both seasons.
- Killer Vine is a vine that grows and grows and is later killed by the giant slug.
- Giant Slug is a monster sent by Klaus to stop the killer vine from eating him.
- Carnivorous Butterfly is a butterfly that eats meat and can enchant its victims with its beauty so it can catch them more easily.
- Cockroaches were fried by a gas explosion underneath Capital city.
- Dragon is a dragon that captures Vanka.
- Ice Monster is a 25-foot (7.6 m) tall ice monster and is featured in both seasons.
- Lobster emerged from a beach in Capital City.
- Blob is an amoeba-type monster that eats anything it wants, such as a truck, bricks, and a wheelbarrow, and separates via mitosis into a second Blob and engulfs and attempts to digest Mayor Mel and nearly engulfs Vanka.
- Worm is an earthworm that eats subway trains.
- Giant Metal-Eating Radioactive Junk Monster is one of Klaus' seemingly failed experiments, but when he threw it out it started absorbing all the metal in the junkyard, becoming a radioactive menace so deadly that even Klaus wanted to destroy it.
- Termites are found in the fire station's basement. The queen termite later trapped Mayor Mel in City Hall.
- Giant Mud Monster is a monster made out of mud.
- Man-Eating Piranhas are a man-eating fish that can fly and come out of water.
- Enormous Ladybug was shrunken back to normal size by Tabby's weapon that was later smashed. Klaus never got a chance to finish it so it is one of the few "friendly" Monsters.
- Giant Sea Cucumber eats ships within Capital City's Harbour and Vanka's new teacher, who was apparently a "mysterious alien" in disguise. The monster was likely created by the aliens and was meant as a trap to kill the Monster Warriors.
- Giant Frog Army are 25-foot (7.6 m) tall frogs.
- Stink Bugs: Unlike other monsters, these giant swarms of stink bugs are a great danger to Capital City. They use their stink powder to choke or poison enemies.
- Mechanical Monkey is a giant robotic monkey, set on hunting superintendent McClellan.
- Giant Jelly Fish is a natural monster that Antonio accidentally brought out when he was testing underwater research equipment.
- Big Foot is a natural monster found in the North Woods.
- Mega Bats are giant bats with large tusks that can impale victims below.
- Leeches are 50-foot (15 m) tall leeches.
- Monumonsters are statues that appear in Capital City park.
- Troglothals are one-eyed troll-like monsters made out of action figures.
- Astrosaurus is a molten lava dinosaur. Klaus brings it to life to terrorize Capital City and fight GigantoBeast.
- Gigantobeast is a giant robotic toy turned into a monster that fights Astrosaurus.
- Computer Bugs emerged from the computer system after Klaus zaps his computer with his monster making ray gun. They eventually corrupt the city's super computer but are defeated.
- Lagoon Man is a monster born out of a Capital City legend.
- Ratblaster is a giant rat that ate Luke's monsterblaster and mutated. Antonio believes that the rat came from other monsters they have defeated in the past, specifically the giant carnivorous butterfly and the Junk monster, and that the rat was once normal sized.
- Gigantic Penguins are created by Klaus after he shoots his monster virtualizer at a bunch of random junk he tossed into Capital City Harbour.
- Gnomes are garden Gnomes that come alive after one of Klaus Von Steinhauer's inventions goes off accidentally.
- Giant Ants seek large amounts of sugar and were possibly created by Klaus Von Steinhauer.
- Yeti is a naturally occurring cryptid like the Bigfoot from the second season, though it is revealed to be a kind and gentle creature who was just misunderstood.
- Bird Lizard is a bird/lizard hybrid brought to life by Antonio accidentally from ancient folklore.

== Episodes ==
=== Season 1 ===
This * means the episodes that are available on DVD.

Episode number	Episode title	Monster
01*	"The Giant Spider Invasion"	Giant Spiders
02*	"The Beast From Beneath the Sea"	Kraken
03*	"Gators"	Giant Alligators
04*	"Buzz!"	Bumblebee
05*	"The Terror Underground"	Giant Earthworm
06*	"The Super Colossal Ice Monster"	Ice Monster
07*	"Dawn of the Dragon"	Dragon
08*	"Anaconda of the North Woods"	Giant Anaconda
09*	"The Giant Lobster Invasion"	Giant Lobster
10*	"Last Ride of the Skeleton Crew"	Skeleton Warrior Crew
11*	"Attack of the Junk Monster"	Giant Metal-Eating Radioactive Junk Monster
12*	"Pterodactyl Terror"	Pterodactyl
13*	"Fall of the Haunted House of T-Rex"	T-Rex
14*	"Attack of the Giant Carnivorous Butterfly"	Giant Carnivorous Butterfly
15	"Capital City vs. the Plant Thing"	Giant Killer Vine & Giant Slug
16	"Beware the Blob Thing"	Blob Creature
17*	"Alien Zombie from the Planet Zeenom"	Alien Zombie from Planet Zeenom
18	"Terror of the Giant Cockroaches"	Giant Cockroaches
19*	"Marauding Mantis"	Giant Praying Mantises
20	"Revenge of the Mud Maniac"	Mud Monsters
21	"Termites"	Giant Termites
22*	"Day of the Piranha"	Man-Eating, Flying, Air Breathing Piranhas
23*	"Attack of the Enormous Terrifying Ladybug"	Giant Ladybug
24*	"Voyage to the Bottom of the Sea Cucumber"	Giant Sea Cucumber
25*	"Ribbit"	Giant Frog Army
26*	"Ribbit 2: Froggy's Revenge"	Giant Frog Army

=== Season 2 ===
Episode number	Episode title	Monster
01	"Attack of the Stinkbugs: Part I"	Stinkbugs
02	"Attack of the Stinkbugs: Part II"	Stinkbugs
03	"Terror at the Drive-In"	Praying Mantis
04	"Alien Returns"	Alien Zombie & Space Monkey
05	"Monkey Machine: Part I"	Mechanical Monkey
06	"Monkey Machine: Part II"	Mechanical Monkey
07	"Beast from Below"	Giant Jellyfish
08	"Megabatua"	Giant Bats
09	"Terror in the North Woods"	Big Foot
10	"The Secrets of the Lost Canyon"	Pterodactyl
11	"Attack of the Leaping Leeches"	Leeches
12	"Attack of the Monumonsters"	Monumonsters
13	"Terror of the Troglothals"	One-eyed troll-like monsters
14	"Astrosaurus vs. Gigantobeast"	Molten-lava dinosaur and a Giant Robot
15	"Invasion of the Computer Bugs"	Computer bugs
16	"Curse of the Lagoon Man"	Lagoon Man of Capital City legend
17	"Ratblaster"	Giant Mutated Rat
18	"Return of the Icemonster"	Ice Monster
19	"Penguins"	Gigantic Penguins
20	"Gnomes for the Holiday"	Gnomes
21	"Trick or Treat"	Ants
22	"Attack of the Abominable Snowman"	Abominable Snowman
23	"Zaal: Kirubian Bird Of Prey"	Kirubian Bird
24	"The Skeleton Crew Rides Again"	Skeleton Gang
25	"UltiBeast: Part 1"	UltiBeast
26	"UltiBeast: Part 2"	UltiBeast, Giant Frog, Giant Mud Monster, Giant Cockroaches, Astrosaurus, Gigantobeast, Pterodactyl, Dragon, Mechanical Monkey, Giant Leaping Leeches, Praying Mantis

== DVD releases ==
Monster Warriors Vs. Creepy Crawlers: Volume 1 was released on June 30, 2009.

Features five episodes:

- "The Giant Spider Invasion" (Episode #1)
- "Buzz!" (Episode #4)
- "Attack of the Giant Carnivorous Butterfly" (Episode #14)
- "Marauding Mantis" (Episode #19)
- "Attack of the Enormous Terrifying Ladybug" (Episode #23)

Monster Warriors: War of the Water World - Volume 2 was released on August 25, 2009.

Features five episodes:

- "The Beast From Beneath the Sea" (Episode #2)
- "Day of the Piranha" (Episode #22)
- "Voyage to the Bottom of the Sea Cucumber" (Episode #24)
- "Ribbit" (Episode #25)
- "Ribbit 2: Froggy's Revenge" (Episode #26)

Plus one bonus episode: "The Giant Lobster Invasion" (Episode #9)

Monster Warriors: Mutant Madness - Volume 3 was released on November 24, 2009.

Features five episodes:

- "The Terror Underground" (Episode #5)
- "Last Ride of the Skeleton Crew" (Episode #10)
- "Attack of the Junk Monster" (Episode #11)
- "Fall of the Haunted House of T-Rex" (Episode #13)
- "Alien Zombie from the Planet Zeenom" (Episode #17)

Monster Warriors: Creature Feature - Volume 4 was released on March 30, 2010.

Features five episodes:

- "Gators" (Episode #3)
- "The Incredible Ice Monster!" (Episode #6)
- "Dawn of the Dragon!" (Episode #7)
- "Attack of the Giant Anaconda!" (Episode #8)
- "Pterodactyl Terror!" (Episode #12)

So far only 21 episodes from the first season are on DVD, but North Video from the Czech Republic has all episodes of the first series on DVD in Czech and English.
