= Stopy života =

- Genre: Drama
- Starring: Ivana Andrlová, Kateřina Brožová, Kristýna Fuitová Nováková
- Country of origin: Czech Republic
- Original language: Czech
- No. of seasons: 2
- No. of episodes: 19

Production
- Running time: 60 minutes

Original release
- Network: Prima (pilot); TV Barrandov
- Release: 2013 – 2015

Related
- Doktorka Kellerová

Stopy života is a Czech television programme which was first broadcast from 2013 to 2015 on TV Prima and TV Barrandov. In total, nineteen parts were created in two seasons. The pilot episode was broadcast in December 2013 on TV Prima. The rest of the series was broadcast during 2014 and 2015 on TV Barrandov. It was followed by Doktorka Kellerová.

== Cast ==
- Ivana Andrlová as Kateřina Vernerová (season 1)
- Kateřina Brožová as Lýdie Kellerová
- Kristýna Fuitová Nováková as Eva Weissová
- Tomáš Magnusek as Viktor Weiss
- Miroslav Vladyka as Jiří Verner (season 1)
- Marek Vašut as Marek Keller
- Valentina Thielová as Jiřina Kainarová (season 1, guest in season 2)
- Jan Kačer as Otakar Kainar (season 1)
- Kateřina Macháčková as Věra Tilerová (season 2, guest season 1)
- Pavlína Němcová as Třísková (season 2)
- Aleš Cibulka as Walek (season 2)
- Ladislav Frej as Jan Tiler (season 2, guest season 1)
- Milan Kňažko as Keller st. (season 2)
