= Létající Čestmír =

1984 Czechoslovak TV series

- Starring: Lukáš Bech, Vladimír Menšík, Ivana Andrlová
- Narrated by: Alena Karešová
- Countries of origin: Czechoslovakia; West Germany
- Original language: Czech
- No. of episodes: 6

Production
- Running time: 45 minutes

Original release
- Network: Czechoslovak Television
- Release: 21 December – 26 December 1984

Létající Čestmír (The Flying Cestmír) is a six-part television series for children, which was co-produced by Czechoslovakia and West Germany in 1983 by director Václav Vorlíček. The series was also broadcast in Vietnam, Mongolia, Germany (Der fliegende Ferdinand), Poland (Latający Czestmir), Hungary, Bulgaria. In Germany it is known under name Der Fliegende Ferdinand (The Flying Ferdinand).

== Plot ==
The main hero is the student Čestmír Trnka, who reaches the planet of flowers thanks to a strange and miraculous meteorite. From here he will bring the seeds of two magical flowers. Thanks to one he can fly, thanks to the other he looks like an adult for a while.

=== Flowers ===
The following miraculous flowers appear in the series:

- Flying flower - whoever smells it can fly.
- The flower of aging - whoever smells it grows old.
- The flower of goodness - whoever smells it has a desire to make others happy, even at their own expense.
- The flower of intelligence - whoever smells it will become very intelligent and gain a lot of knowledge.
- The flower of health - whoever smells it will be cured of all diseases, including hair loss.
- Flower of power - whoever smells it has great physical strength.
- Flower of hearing - whoever smells it will get good hearing. For example, they can hear people's conversations even at a great distance.
- White flower - whoever smells it will rejuvenate into childhood.

The effect of the health flower and the white flower is permanent, while the effect of the other flowers will disappear after a certain period of time.

== Cast ==
- Lukáš Bech as pupil Čestmír Trnka, eponymous protagonist of the series. He is named Ferdinand in German version.
- Jan Kreidl as pupil David Pelc
- Žaneta Fuchsová as pupil Barbora Bartáková
- Antonín Kala as pupil Oskar Blecha, the main antagonist
- Vladimír Menšík as Zbyněk Trnka, Čestmír's father who works at Institute for Betterment of Human
- Zdena Hadrbolcová as Helena Trnková, Čestmír's mother
- Ivana Andrlová as Zuzana Trnková, Čestmír's sister and assistant in Institute
- Petr Nárožný as Bedřich Blecha, barber, Oskar's father
- Iva Janžurová as barber Blechová, Oskar's mother
- Ivan Vyskočil as teacher Filip Janda
- Jiří Sovák as professor Otakar Langmajer, director of Institute for Betterment of Human
- Nelly Gaierová as Otylka Langmajerová, his sister
- Marie Rosůlková as Cecilka Langmajerová, his sister
- Jiřina Bohdalová as teacher Klepáčová
- Stella Zázvorková as director of the school
- Martin Růžek as professor Ohlsson
- Jiří Lábus as pupil David Pelc - as an adult
- Simona Stašová as pupil Barbora Bartáková - as an adult
- Viktor Král as Otakar Langmajer - after getting younger
- Alena Karešová as narrator (voice only)

== Episodes ==
1. Modrý kámen
2. Šest květináčů
3. Geniální rodina
4. Velký vezír
5. Rodina na větvi
6. Poslední květina

== Production ==
The exteriors of the series were filmed in Mělník and Štiřín Castle. The series exists in two versions, German and Czech. The Czech version has 6 parts of approx. 45 minutes each, the German version has 12 parts of approx. 30 minutes each. The scenes where the inscriptions are in the shot were filmed twice, once in the Czech version and the second time in the German version. Some shots are only found in the Czech version, missing in the German version. Production took eight months.
