= La'uf al HaMillion =

- Presented by: Yaron Brovinsky
- Country of origin: Israel
- No. of seasons: 7
- No. of episodes: 125

Production
- Running time: 45 minutes

Original release
- Network: Channel 10
- Release: December 20, 2010 – April 16, 2020

La'uf al HaMillion (Hebrew: לעוף על המיליון, "Fly for a Million") is an Israeli game show hosted by Yaron Brovinsky. It has been broadcast on Channel 10 since December 2010. The show's format was developed for Channel 10 by July August Productions.. The show format was sold to a number of other countries.

== Objective ==
Each round, there's a main contestant, who competes with ten other contestants in trivia questions. The main contestant's goal is to beat as many contestants in a head-to-head match. If the main contestant succeeds in knocking out all ten, they win 1,000,000 NIS. The name of the show refers to the gimmick in the show when a contestant flies down a trapdoor under the feet after missing a question.

== International versions ==
Legend: Currently airing No longer airing Upcoming season

Country	Title	Network	Host	Date aired	Prize
Arab World	المصيدة; El masyadeh	MBC1	Badr Al Zeidan	October 23, 2013 – January 15, 2014	SR1,000,000
Argentina	¡Ahora caigo!	El Trece	Darío Barassi	June 5, 2023 – present	$2,000,000
Belgium (in Dutch)	Valkuil	VTM	Kürt Rogiers	January 5, 2015 – 2016	€5,000
Belgium (in French)	Still Standing : Qui passera à la trappe ?	RTL-TVI	Jean-Michel Zecca	March 12, 2016 – 2017	€25,000
Brazil	Quem Fica em Pé?	Band	Datena	April 9, 2012 – December 5, 2013	R$100,000
Brazil	Acerte ou Caia!	Record	Tom Cavalcante	August 18, 2024 – present	R$300,000
Chile	¡Ahora caigo!	TVN	Daniel Fuenzalida	March 4, 2024 – present	$3,500
China	一站到底; Yizhan Daodi	JSBC	Li Hao and Guo Xiaomin	March 2, 2012 – present	Electronics, Home appliances, ¥400,000 and Free double trip to places around the world
Ecuador	¡Ahora caigo!	Teleamazonas	Víctor Aráuz	March 6, 2024 – present	750$
France	Still Standing : Qui passera à la trappe ?	D8	Julien Courbet	August 8, 2016 – September 2, 2016	€25,000
Germany	Ab durch die Mitte – Das schnellste Quiz der Welt	Sat.1	Daniel Boschmann	July 2, 2012 – September 8, 2012	€50,000
Greece	Still Standing	ANT1	Maria Bekatorou	September 8, 2017 – June 11, 2021	€30,000
Greece	Still Standing	Skai TV	Christos Ferentinos	September 16, 2024 – May 26, 2025	€30,000
Hungary	Maradj talpon!	m1 (2011–2014); Duna TV (2015–2017)	Gábor Gundel Takács (2011–2017); Barna Héder (2017)	October 3, 2011 – December 19, 2014 (M1); August 31, 2015 – June 16, 2017 (Duna TV)	25,000,000Ft.
India (in Malayalam)	Still Standing	Mazhavil Manorama	Adil Ibrahim	May 27, 2017 – present	₨1,000,000
Israel (original version)	לעוף על המיליון; La'uf al HaMillion	Channel 10	Yaron Brovinsky	December 20, 2010 – April 16, 2020	₪1,000,000
Italy	Caduta libera	Canale 5	Gerry Scotti (2015–2025); Max Giusti (2025–present)	May 4, 2015 – present	€100,000 (1st edition; 13th edition) €300,000 (2nd-3rd edition; 14th edition) €500,000 (4th-12th edition; 14th-15th edition edition)
Spain	¡Ahora caigo!	Antena 3	Arturo Valls; Silvia Abril (Summer 2019)	July 6, 2011 – September 28, 2011 (weekly)	€200,000 (weekly)
Spain	¡Ahora caigo!	Antena 3	Arturo Valls; Silvia Abril (Summer 2019)	August 22, 2011 – August 1, 2021 (daily)	€100,000 (2011–2021) €300,000 (2021) (daily)
Thailand	ตกสิบหยิบล้าน Still Standing Thailand; Ten Fall, Grab A Million: Still Standing Thailand	Channel 7	Varavuth Jentanakul	October 1, 2015 – February 28, 2019	฿1,000,000
Thailand	ตกสิบหยิบล้านกำลัง 2 Still Standing Thailand; Ten Fall, Grab A Million Squared: Still Standing Thailand	Amarin TV	Sakuntala Teinpairoj; Pisanu Nimsakul	April 22, 2019 – November 18, 2019	฿1,000,000
Thailand	ตกสิบ ติดสปีด; Ten Fall, Fast Speed	Channel 7	Varavuth Jentanakul; Sakuntala Teinpairoj	March 2, 2018 – March 1, 2019	฿240,000
Turkey	Eyvah Düşüyorum	Star TV	Eser Yenenler	January 6, 2012 – March 13, 2013	500,000TL
Turkey	Eyvah Düşüyorum	Star TV	Mehmet Ali Erbil	June 13, 2014 – January 1, 2025	250,000TL
United States (in English)	Who's Still Standing?	NBC	Ben Bailey	December 19, 2011 – January 30, 2012	$1,000,000
United States (in Spanish)	¿Quién caerá?	UniMas	Adamari Lopez	January 8, 2024 – present	$~3000
Uruguay	¡Ahora caigo! Uruguay ¡Ahora caigo Kids! ¡Ahora caigo! Celebrity	Canal 4	Gustaf van Perinostein	August 3, 2022 – present	$250,000
Vietnam	Người đứng vững – Still Standing Vietnam	HTV7	Huy Khánh	July 25, 2016 – August 24, 2017	VNĐ100,000,000
