= Lara Amersey =

Canadian actress

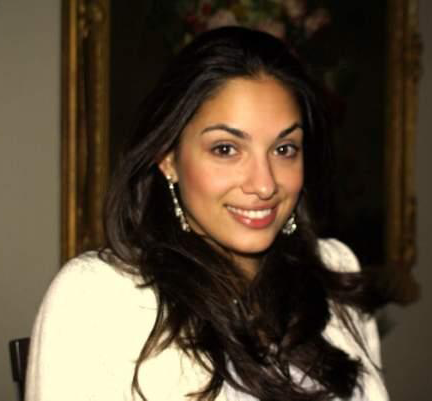
- Born: Montreal, Quebec, Canada
- Occupation: Actress
- Years active: 2003–present

Lara Amersey is a Canadian actress. She is known for her roles in Life with Derek, Overruled, Monster Warriors and Land of the Dead.

== Life and career ==
Amersey was born in 1984 and relocated with her family to Toronto, Ontario in 1991. In 2003, she got her break in a Stridex commercial. Following that, she appeared in many other commercials including ads for 7Up, Coca-Cola and American Express. The following year she landed a role on the hit kids show Radio Free Roscoe which helped to start her career as an actress and is still the series that she is most recognized for. Since then, she has guest starred in shows such as Life with Derek as Lucy, Overruled as Rory Jablonski, as well as short films Hate, Rose, and Red Velvet Girls as well as the feature film Land of the Dead. Her most recent work includes episodes of Warehouse 13 and Flashpoint.

Amersey's most memorable work to date has been her leading role on the television series Monster Warriors. She starred as Vanka, an athletic, aggressive, overpowering girl with an interest in ancient combat and rituals. The series has aired all over the world in many different languages.

Amersey has also worked as an associate producer for Jordan Entertainment.

== Filmography ==
Film
Year	Title	Role	Notes	Ref.
2005	Hate	Doria	TV film	
2005	Rose	Pari	TV film	
2005	Land of the Dead	Dead Teenage Girl	Feature film	
2005	Red Velvet Girls	Julia	Short film	
2012	Scars	Dana	Short film	
2019	My Mother’s Killer Boyfriend	Carrie Knolls	TV film	
2020	Christmas on Wheels	Gabby	TV film	
2021	A Perfect Match	Shannon	TV film	
2021	Love's Sweet Recipe	Jess	TV film	
2021	Deadly Mom Retreat	Jules	TV film	
2021	How to Find Forever	Lara Ashcroft	TV film	
2022	Christmas in Toyland	Stephanie	TV film	
2024	Operation Nutcracker	Pam	TV film	

Television
Year	Title	Role	Notes
2004	Radio Free Roscoe	Bridgette	3 episodes
2006–2007	Monster Warriors	Vanka	51 episodes
2007	Life with Derek	Lucy	Episode: "Two Timing Derek"
2009	Warehouse 13	Claire	Episode: "Regrets"
2009	Overruled!	Rory Jablonksky	Episode: "Worlds Collide"
2011	Flashpoint	Angela	Episode: "Terror"
2018	Private Eyes	Rosie	Episode: "Brew the Right Thing"
2022	Workin' Moms	Nurse Robin	Episode: "Warm Lunch"
2024	Mistletoe Murders	June Hubble	
