= Kateřina Brožová =

Czech actress and singer (b. 1968)

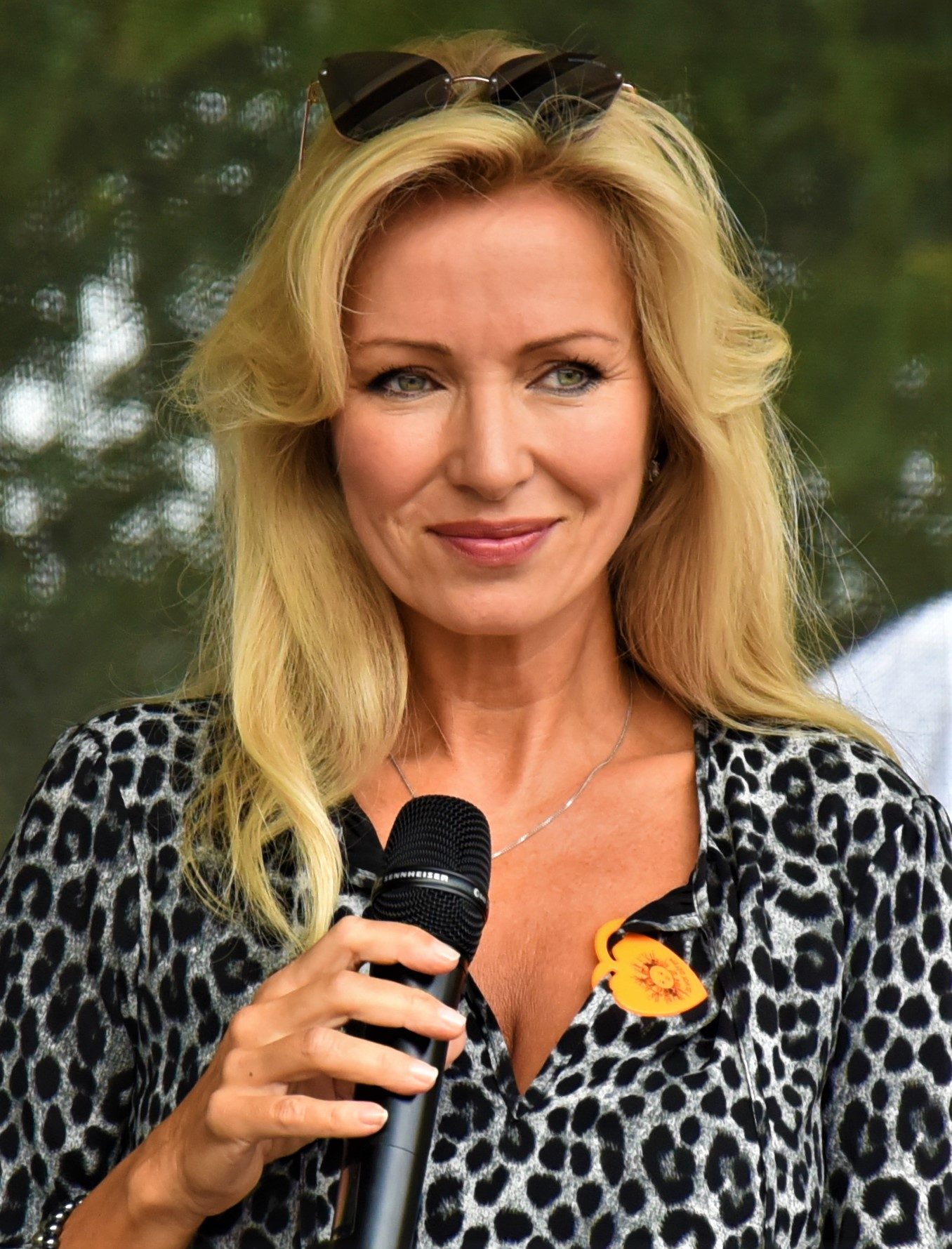
- Born: 9 February 1968 (age 58); Prague, Czechoslovakia
- Occupations: Actress, singer
- Years active: 1991–present
- Spouse: Zdeněk Toman (m. 1997–2004)
- Children: 1
- Website: brozova.cz

Kateřina Brožová (born 9 February 1968 in Prague) is a Czech actress and singer.

== Theatre ==
- Solange – Léto v Nohantu
- Roza – Tanec na konci léta
- Erna – Duše, krajina širá
- Orsetta – Poprask na laguně
- Gwendolina – Jak je důležité míti Filipa
- Angelika – Zdravý nemocný
- Elén – Jezinky a bezinky
- Vivienne – Taková ženská na krku
- Urraca – Cid
- Sylvie – Dva kavalíři z Verony
- Marie – Dům čtyř letor
- Hazel – Smutek sluší Elektře
- Anna – Markýza de Sade
- Jacqueline – A do pyžam!

== Selected filmography ==
=== Films ===
- Manželka Ronalda Sheldona (2001) TV
- Ohnivé jaro (1994)
- Vášnivé známosti (1994) TV
- Šplhající profesor (1992) TV
- Princezna Fantaghiro: Jeskyně Zlaté růže (1991) TV
- Radostný život posmrtný (1990) TV
- O Janovi a podivuhodném příteli (1990) TV

=== TV series ===
- Modrý kód (2017–2018)
- Doktorka Kellerová (2016–2017)
- Stopy života (2014–2015)
- Cesty domů (2010)
- Pojišťovna štěstí (2004)

== Discography ==
=== Studio albums ===
- Zpívám si (1997)
- Obyčený příběh (1999)
- Ráda se svlíkám (2002)
- American Dream (2005)
- Christmas Dream (2005)
- Kateřina (2006)
- Nejkrásnější vánoční koledy (2009)
