= Cash Cab (Australian game show) =

Australian music trivia game show

- Australian Cash Cab logo
- Genre: Game show
- Created by: Adam Wood
- Presented by: James Kerley (1-2, 4-5); Charlie Pickering (3)
- Country of origin: Australia
- No. of seasons: 5

Production
- Running time: 30 minutes (including commercials)
- Production company: XYZnetworks

Original release
- Network: Channel V
- Release: 2007 – 2014

Related
- Cash Cab

Cash Cab is an Australian music trivia game show hosted by James Kerley, except for the third season, where he was replaced by Charlie Pickering while Kerley hosted Network 10 dating show Taken Out. It is part of the global Cash Cab franchise that originated in the United Kingdom. The first two seasons of the series were filmed in Melbourne, with the third being based in Perth and the fourth based in the Gold Coast. The programme airs on the Australian subscription television music channel, Channel V.

A parody of this show has appeared on Balls of Steel Australia which is also hosted by Kerley.

== Format ==
Contestants are asked several trivia questions (mainly music questions) in various verbal, audio and video based questions for the duration of their taxi trip. After being asked 5 questions, players are asked to choose The Loot or the Boot. Contestants have the opportunity to keep "the loot" they have won so far, or trade it all, depending on how many questions they answered correctly, for what is in "the boot". Boot prizes may be worth substantially more or substantially less than their current winnings. By choosing "the boot," the contestant's winnings are reset to $0 and the prize is theirs to keep, even if they use up their three strikes. On rare occasions, the host may give an opportunity to the contestant to win some of their money back by doing a 30-second dare relating to their substantially less valuable "boot" prize. Contestants are entitled to two lifelines, or "Shout Outs", one 30 second phone call to a friend on the phone (a "Mobile Shout-Out") or to ask a passer-by off the street (a "Street Shout-Out") that they are travelling on. When contestants reach their destination, they are asked if they want to "Double or Nothing" in which they can choose to walk away with what cash they have won, or to sit and watch a video clip and be asked an observation-based question. If they answer correctly, they walk away with double the winnings of the trip. If they get it wrong, they walk away with nothing.
