= Alexandre Barrette =

Canadian television presenter

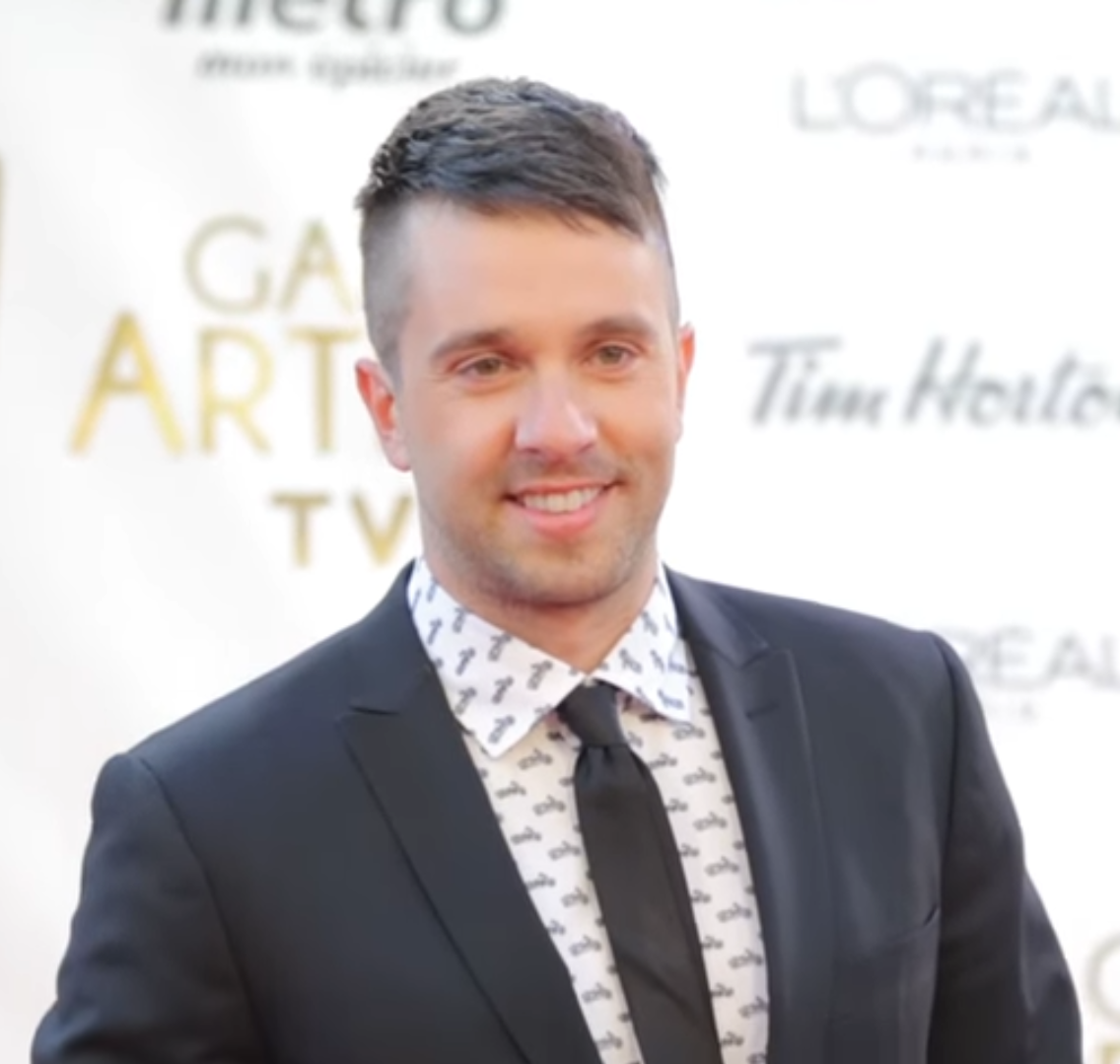
Alexandre Barrette in Montreal, April 2016.

Alexandre Barrette (born September 30, 1981, in Quebec City, Quebec) is a French Canadian comedian and TV personality. He hosts several TV game shows seen on the V television network. They include Taxi Payant, the French Canadian version of Cash Cab and Atomes Crochus (Missing Links), the French Canadian version of the Match Game.
