= Cash Cab (Canadian game show) =

- Canadian Cash Cab logo
- Genre: Game show
- Created by: Adam Wood
- Presented by: Adam Growe
- Country of origin: Canada
- No. of seasons: 8
- No. of episodes: 200+

Production
- Running time: 30mins (inc. comms)
- Production company: Castlewood Productions

Original release
- Network: Discovery Channel
- Release: September 10, 2010 – August 22, 2015

Related
- Cash Cab

Cash Cab is a Canadian game show produced by Castlewood Productions that began airing on September 10, 2010 on Discovery Channel and Discovery HD. It is hosted by comedian Adam Growe. The game show airs in Canada instead of the American version of the series, which airs on the affiliated US Discovery Channel network. Cash Cab is the English version of the Cash Cab franchise available in Canada; the French version is called Taxi Payant, and airs on V.

In 2023, it was announced that the series would be revived as Cash Cab Music, hosted by Growe. The show premiered in 2024 on AXS TV in the United States and on Game TV in Canada.

== Game show ==
The game show features rounds like "Shout Outs", "Red Light Challenges", and the "Double or Nothing" Video Bonus option at the end of each game. However, the Canadian version differs in its heavier focus on questions of science, technology, nature and adventure, as opposed to purely general knowledge. Regular questions are worth $25, $50, $100; while Red Light Challenge questions are worth $75. In the second season, a third "lifeline" was added: when contestants reach the $100 questions, they have the option to "swap out" a question, and the Cash Cab dispatcher will give them a new question.

In the Cash Cab Vancouver season, a bridge bonus was added, which doubles the score for the current question once per session. After returning to Toronto, a high five bonus was added, which doubles the score for the fifth correct answer in a row.

The 8th season and last season of Cash Cab aired in 2015, which features a new "Triple Play" component, where contestants have a chance to triple their winnings if they go for the Video Bonus Question, and only if they arrive at their destination strike-free.

Over 200 episodes have been completed, plus a one-hour special. All episodes of Cash Cab were shot in Canadian cities, with all but 1 season of 26 episodes filmed in downtown Toronto. Season 5 was shot in Vancouver in the summer of 2011. The cab used is a facelifted XL20 Toyota Sienna minivan.

== History ==
Following the success of the first season, Canada's host Adam Growe was invited to host a special season premiere episode of the American Cash Cab on December 23, 2008, which promoted the feature film Frost/Nixon.

In the summer of 2009, Cash Cab was briefly broadcast in a programming block with Qubit.

On July 16, 2011, a 61-year-old man from Surrey, British Columbia was struck and killed in downtown Vancouver by a vehicle used for the Canadian version of Cash Cab. The incident happened while the producer was driving the cab back to the storage facility after filming.

== Broadcast ==
Cash Cab debuted on Discovery Channel on September 10, 2008 when it first aired in Canada on Discovery. Discovery was the only channel to air it until The Comedy Network started broadcasting it; it then began broadcasting on CTV Comedy Channel on June 1, 2011. On December 13, 2023, it was announced that the series would be revived as Cash Cab Music with Growe returning as host. It premiered in the United States on AXS TV on January 8, 2024, while premiering on GameTV in Canada on March 4, 2024.

As of the launch of the Bell Media's 2024 F.A.S.T. Channels launch the show would run in syndication on the channel CTV Laughs.

== Related shows ==
A French Canadian version is also aired on V (formerly known as TQS) and is filmed in Montreal. It is known as Taxi Payant (Paying Taxi) and uses a Dodge Grand Caravan. Comedian Alexandre Barrette is the host.
