= Chlapci a chlapi =

- Genre: Drama
- Written by: Karel Štorkán; Jiří Bednář
- Directed by: Evžen Sokolovský
- Country of origin: Czechoslovakia
- No. of episodes: 11

Production
- Running time: 60 minutes

Original release
- Release: 1988

Chlapci a chlapi (English: Boys and Men) is a TV series produced and broadcast in Czechoslovakia in 1988. There are altogether 11 episodes in the series. It follows the story of a group of Czech and Slovak men in their mandatory army service. The series was generally well received and is very well known in Central Europe. It stars Martin Zounar, Boris Slivka, Roman Hájek, Josef Bláha, Jaroslava Adamová among others. The show was directed by Evžen Sokolovský.
