= Who's Still Standing? =

- Genre: Game show
- Created by: Lisa Shiloach-Uzrad; Amit Stretiner
- Based on: La'uf al HaMillion
- Presented by: Ben Bailey
- Theme music composer: Jeff Lippencott; David Mark T. Williams
- Country of origin: United States
- Original language: English
- No. of seasons: 1
- No. of episodes: 9

Production
- Executive producers: Craig Plestis; Tim Puntillo; Lisa Shiloach-Urzad; Amit Stretiner; Avi Armoza
- Running time: approx. 40 minutes
- Production companies: Smart Dog Media; Armoza Formats; Universal Television

Original release
- Network: NBC
- Release: December 19, 2011 – January 30, 2012

Who's Still Standing? is an American adaptation of the Israeli game show La'uf al HaMillion, (Hebrew: לעוף על המיליון) or Fly for the Million, which offers contestants the opportunity to win up to $1 million while competing in head-to-head trivia battles. Ben Bailey hosted the show, which originally ran on NBC from December 19, 2011, to January 30, 2012.

On May 13, 2012, it was announced that the show would not be renewed for a second season due to high production costs, despite having acceptable ratings.

== Format ==
One player (the "hero") attempts to defeat 10 competitors ("strangers") in a series of trivia showdowns to win $1 million. The hero stands at center stage, with the 10 strangers standing around the perimeter and facing in toward the hero. Each participant stands on a trapdoor. In each round, the hero selects one stranger to challenge in a head-to-head trivia battle. The host asks alternating questions, starting with the stranger, with a series of partially filled-in blanks showing the words in the correct answer. The participant has 20 seconds to give the correct answer, starting from the moment the question appears. The answer must be given as spelled out in the puzzle (although slight variations in pronunciations are allowed). The contestant may think out loud and offer multiple guesses without penalty, and must say the correct answer before time expires in order to remain in the game.

The hero is given two passes (or three, in some episodes) at the start of the game. Passing a question forces the stranger to answer it, with a fresh 20-second countdown. Strangers may not pass; they must answer every question put to them.

The challenge ends when a contestant misses a question; the trapdoor under that person's feet then opens, dropping them through the stage and eliminating them from the game with no winnings. If the hero drops, the victorious stranger wins $10,000 ($25,000 in the eighth or ninth challenge, $50,000 in the tenth challenge). If the stranger drops, the hero wins an amount of money between $1,000 and $20,000, revealed on a screen at the stranger's position once the challenge is over. The value of each stranger is based on the difficulty that the hero is expected to face in defeating them.

Every second challenge of a game is introduced as a specialty round in which all the questions and answers share a common theme or word.

After five strangers have dropped, the hero is offered a chance to leave the game with all money won to that point, or stay in and try to win more. If the hero decides to stay in, they receive one more pass and will have another chance to leave after each subsequent stranger is dropped. Dropping eight, nine, or all 10 strangers increases the hero's winnings to $250,000, $500,000, or $1 million, respectively. Any hero who chooses to end the game and keep their winnings has the option of leaving by walking out of the studio or dropping through the floor.

After the hero exits the game, the remaining strangers, including the one who defeated the hero if applicable, play a speed round among themselves. The host asks a question to each one in turn, with 10 seconds on the clock instead of 20. Each correct answer adds $2,000 to a jackpot (although in some episodes, only $1,000 is added to the jackpot), while a wrong answer (or when the time runs out) drops the stranger with no winnings (although if the hero had been defeated, the stranger who defeated the hero still keeps their winnings). The last one left standing wins the entire jackpot. As with a winning hero, the winner has the option of walking out of the studio or dropping through the trap door. A Speed Round is always played and filmed when at least two strangers remain; should there not be enough time to air the Speed Round, it may either be posted on the show's website after the episode airs, or aired on a subsequent episode.

== Spanish Version ==
A Spanish language version entitled ¿Quién caerá? has begun airing on UniMás on January 8, 2024.
