= BrainRush =

2009 American game show

- Also known as: BrainRu$h
- Created by: Michael Krupat
- Starring: Lamorne Morris; Sarah Karges
- Opening theme: BrainRush Theme
- Country of origin: United States
- Original language: English
- No. of seasons: 1
- No. of episodes: 6

Production
- Executive producers: Adam Cohen; Cara Tapper; Joanna Vernetti; Dave Noll; Michael Krupat
- Running time: 30 minutes
- Production company: Super Delicious

Original release
- Network: Cartoon Network
- Release: June 20 – July 22, 2009

BrainRush (stylized as BrainRu$h) is a live-action game show on Cartoon Network, hosted by Lamorne Morris and, to a lesser extent, Sarah Karges. It first aired on June 20, 2009, with its last episode airing on July 22, ending after one season. It was part of Cartoon Network's late-2000s phase of live-action programming.

== Format ==
Unwitting contestants are asked to answer trivia questions on roller coasters. The show takes place at Knott's Berry Farm in Buena Park, California.

=== Round 1: Quick Quiz (Boomerang) ===
The host sits on the Boomerang. Anyone who sits next to the host becomes a contestant. Each contestant is asked a series of questions over the course of the ride. (As noted in episode 4, the total ride time is one minute and 45 seconds.) Each correct answer is worth $25. The 2 contestants with the most money advance to the second round.

In the event of a tie, a tiebreaker question with a numerical answer is asked (generally, the question is about the Boomerang coaster). The contestant whose guess is the closest to the correct answer without going over moves on. The eliminated contestant is paid his/her winnings immediately.

=== Round 2 (Silver Bullet) ===
Each of the remaining two players picks one of two games, hidden in two colored envelopes. The player with the least earnings from level 1 goes first. Generally, each part of the game is worth $50 and both games have the same amount of money available ($300). The money from both rounds are combined, and the person with the most money at the end of this round wins the game. The losing contestant is paid his or her winnings immediately. If there is a tie at the end of round 2, a numerical question is asked in a similar manner to round one.

==== Games in Round 2 ====
Street Wise: The host tells the player five letters of the alphabet during the ride. At the end of the ride, the player must remember those five letters. Each letter correctly recalled is worth $50. In addition, regardless of the player's performance, the player is given the five correct letters, and must unscramble them into a slang word based on a clue given by the host. If the player unscrambles the word within 30 seconds, he or she wins another $50.

Regurgitator: The player is read a short story (typically an article from USA Today) as the Silver Bullet moves up the lift hill. He or she is then asked six questions about the story over the course of the ride. Each correct answer is worth $50.

Represent: During the ride, the host tells the player three random words, and there are three random pictures shown around the park. After the ride, the player can list any of the words or pictures for $50 each.

Hurling Hangman: The player looks for three letters while on the ride. At the end of the ride, they can recall the letters for $50 each. Afterward, they use the letters to complete three words within a time limit of 10 seconds; each word correctly completed is worth a further $50.

=== Round 3: Motor Mouth (Xcelerator) ===
The contestant selects one of four categories for the round. Prior to the start of the final level, he/she is given the chance to eat a food item for a $100 bonus. The contestant must eat the entire dish to earn the bonus.

Categories

- Zap-Pow - Superheroes & comic books
- Penalty Box - Sports
- Watch-Out - Television & movies
- Know It All - General knowledge

The contestant is asked a question with multiple answers, and must give as many correct answers as possible over the course of the ride (a total of 24 seconds in length). The first correct answer is worth $50; each additional correct answer is worth $50 more than the previous one (for example, giving 5 correct answers wins $750, or $50+$100+$150+$200+$250).

Afterwards, he/she is given the option of keeping all their winnings or risking half of it on one final question. The contestant sits on the Xcelerator in the station to answer the question. If the contestant gives the correct answer (the light turns green), he or she doubles his/her winnings and the coaster takes off immediately, however, if the answer is incorrect (light turns red), the contestant loses half of their total (the total is rounded down in the event of halving an odd amount). In the latter event, the host offers the player a final ride anyway. Regardless of the result, the $100 bonus for eating the food is not doubled or halved.

== Broadcast ==
The show premiered on June 20, 2009, as part of Cartoon Network's live-action programming block, CN Real. The first four episodes premiered on Saturday nights at 8:00pm ET. However, when the Saturday night CN Real block was removed, the remaining two episodes premiered on Wednesday nights at 8:00pm ET.

Five of the six episodes can be found on the internet, with only a brief clip for the remaining episode is online.

== Episodes ==
| No. | Title | Original release date |
|---|---|---|
| 1 | "Antwone, Hope, Jake" | June 20, 2009 |
Antwone, Hope and Jake compete. Antwone won $100, Hope won $225, and Jake won $1,200.
| 2 | "Kaitlin, Trevor, Darnell" | June 27, 2009 |
Kaitlin, Trevor, and Darnell compete. Darnell won $50, Trevor won $225, and Kaitlin won $550.
| 3 | "Vin, Chris, Blake" | July 4, 2009 |
Vin, Chris, and Blake compete. Chris won $50, Blake won $325, and Vin won $1,850.
| 4 | "Eddie, Matt, Shanavea" | July 11, 2009 |
Eddie, Matt, and Shanavea compete. Matt won $100, Shanavea won $400, and Eddie won $4,450.
| 5 | "Nick, Austin, Larenz" | July 15, 2009 |
Nick, Austin, and Larenz compete. Austin won $50, Nick won $300, and Larenz won $1,362.
| 6 | "Devon, Walter, Paloma" | July 22, 2009 |
Devon, Walter, and Paloma compete. Devon won $50, Paloma won $300, and Walter won $5,250.

== Winnings ==
| Episode | Contestants | Games played | Eliminated Contestants | Winner's Total |
|---|---|---|---|---|
| Episode 1 | Antwone; Hope; Jake | Antwone: Round 1- $100; Hope: Round 1- $125; Regurgitator- $100; Jake: Round 1- $100; Streetwise- $200; Watch Out- $300 (plus cheeseburger bonus of $100) | Antwone: $100*; Hope: $225 | Jake: $1,300 ($600 was doubled, plus $100 cheeseburger bonus) |
| Episode 2 | Darnell; Trevor; Kaitlin | Darnell: Round 1- $50; Trevor: Round 1- $175; Regurgitator: $50; Kaitlin: Round 1- $100; Represent- $250; Watch Out- $750 | Darnell: $50; Trevor: $225 | Kaitlin: $550 (halved from $1,100) |
| Episode 3 | Chris; Blake; Vin | Chris: Round 1- $50; Blake: Round 1- $75; Regurgitator- $250; Vin: Round 1- $125; Streetwise- $250; Zap-pow: $500 (plus chili cheese fries bonus of $100) | Chris: $50; Blake: $325 | Vin: $1,850 ($875 was doubled, plus $100 chili cheese fries bonus) |
| Episode 4 | Matt; Shanavea; Eddie | Matt: Round 1- $100; Shanavea: Round 1- $100; Hurling Hangman- $300; Eddie: Round 1- $150; Regurgitator- $300; Penalty Box- $1,800 | Matt: $100*; Shanavea: $400 | Eddie: $4,450 (doubled from $2,225) |
| Episode 5 | Austin; Nick; Larenz | Nick: Round 1-$100; Regurgitator- $200; Austin: Round 1- $50; Larenz: Round 1- $175; Represent- $300; Know It All- $2,250 | Austin: $50; Nick: $300 | Larenz: $1,362 (halved from $2,725) |
| Episode 6 | Devon; Paloma; Walter | Devon: Round 1-$50; Paloma: Round 1- $100; Regurgitator- $200; Walter: Round 1- $75; Represent- $375; Penalty Box- $2,625 (cheeseburger bonus: $100) | Devon: $50; Paloma: $300 | Walter: $5,350 ($2,625 was doubled, plus $100 cheeseburger bonus) |
Biggest Winner- Walter from Episode 6 ($5,350)

1. Contestant answered bonus question correctly and passed.
2. Contestant answered bonus question incorrectly and was eliminated.

* These contestants lost on the tiebreaker question in round 1.

== See also ==
- Cash Cab
