= Cash Cab (American game show) =

American television game show

- Genre: Game show
- Created by: Adam Wood
- Presented by: Ben Bailey; Beth Melewski
- Country of origin: United States
- Original language: English
- No. of seasons: 9
- No. of episodes: 440

Production
- Running time: 30–60 minutes
- Production company: Lion Television

Original release
- Network: Discovery Channel (2005–12, 2017–18); Bravo (2019–20)
- Release: December 5, 2005 – August 26, 2020

Related
- Cash Cab

Cash Cab is an American game show that originally premiered in 2005 on the Discovery Channel, hosted by stand-up comedian Ben Bailey. It is part of the global Cash Cab franchise that originated in the United Kingdom.

== Broadcast history ==
According to Variety, Discovery Channel initially ordered 40 episodes from Lion Television; taping of the initial run was completed in November 2005 before the show premiered that December. Additional batches of 40 episodes were taped and aired in 2006 and 2007, 80 episodes were taped in 2007 and aired through spring and summer, 40 episodes were taped and aired in 2008 and 2009, and 40 episodes were taped for airing in 2010 and 2011.

On August 8, 2007, Discovery Channel began airing a spin-off edition of the program, Cash Cab: After Dark, in which contestants were picked up near or after sunset as well as overnight and the cash value of the questions was double that of the regular version of the show. The questions were usually more difficult than the daytime version. The spinoff was ended after just nine episodes.

While the show was usually taped in New York City, some episodes of the fifth season were taped in Las Vegas. The sixth season premiered on January 5, 2012. On April 18, 2012, it was announced that Cash Cab would end its run.

On March 27, 2017, Discovery announced it was working on episodes featuring "appearances from notables in comedy, film, and TV.” On June 5, 2017, original host Ben Bailey confirmed he would return for a new season. Season 7 premiered on December 4, 2017. Season 8 premiered on July 27, 2018, with a special Shark Week episode to coincide with the 30th anniversary of Shark Week.

On September 19, 2019, it was announced that the series would move to Bravo. Season 9 premiered on October 7, 2019.

== Rules ==
When the potential contestants enter the cab and state their destination, they are made aware that they are in the Cash Cab as ceiling lights and a fanfare plays inside, accompanied by the host's greeting. While the only rules given on-camera after the introduction and before asking "What do you say? Do you want to play?" pertain to his or her driving and the "three strikes and you're out" rule, the contestants are also informed that once their traveling begins, the cab will not take detours of any kind unless directed by a police officer, stop sign, traffic light or other legal means of diverting traffic. Bailey offers them the chance to get out of the cab if they do not wish to play, and contestants who choose to play the game must stay in the cab until they reach their destination or get three strikes.

For the first season, the first five questions were worth $25 each, the next five questions were worth $50 each, and any question thereafter was worth $100. For the second season, the first four questions were worth $25 each, the next four were worth $50 each, and the ninth and succeeding questions were worth $100. In Cash Cab: After Dark – and beginning with the regular episodes of Season 3 – all of the money values were doubled to $50, $100, and $200.

Each wrong answer earns the contestant(s) a strike. On the third strike, they forfeit all their winnings and Bailey will immediately pull over and kick them out of the cab. Once players have exited the Cash Cab, a camera crew from the trailing production van is already on the street waiting to tape their departure.

=== Red Light Challenge ===
When a contestant has won at least $200 or $300 and the cab stops at a red traffic light, Bailey will announce a Red Light Challenge. He reads a question that has multiple correct answers, usually four to nine, and the passenger(s) have/has 30 seconds to give those answers; they do not always have to give all of the answers. Since there is no penalty for an incorrect answer, giving all the correct answers in the allotted time is worth $250 regardless of how many incorrect answers a contestant might also blurt out along the way. The contestant does not receive the extra money if the 30-second time limit runs out, but it is also not counted as a strike, and the contestant does not lose any accumulated money. While only one Red Light Challenge is usually played per game, beginning in Season 4 there are multiple Red Light Challenges during certain games.

=== Shout-Outs ===
Contestants have two forms of lifelines known as "Shout-Outs" at their disposal during the game; each can be used only once, and neither may be used on a Red Light Challenge or a Video Bonus. In the Mobile Shout-Out, the contestant makes a phone call to someone they choose using a cell phone either provided by Bailey or one belonging to a contestant if they have one. The call can take up to a maximum of 15 seconds before the contestant has to answer, with the result being either additional money or a strike. The contestant may also elect to use a Street Shout-Out, in which Bailey immediately pulls the cab to a curb so that anyone on the sidewalk can be asked for help, without any official time limit. A second Street Shout-Out is included on a Double Ride. In the revived Cash Cab, the Mobile Shout-Out was replaced by the Social Media Shout-Out, in which Ben activates Facebook Live so that those on the site may help the contestant.

=== Video Bonus ===
When the passenger(s) reach(es) their destination without striking out, Bailey offers a choice: the option of leaving the cab and keeping the prize money that they have won, or they can stay and try to double their money by risking it all on a Video Bonus question. Bailey plays a video clip and asks the contestant(s) a single question based on its content. If the question is answered correctly, the contestant(s) win(s) double what they have earned so far, but if they are wrong, they lose all of their money "at the very last moment," as Bailey says, and "leave with nothing but a cab ride."

Unlike some other versions of the game, U.S. contestants who decline to attempt the Video Bonus are not shown the question they would have been asked.

=== Double Ride ===
Beginning in Season 4, randomly selected passengers, on rare occasions, can win double the amount of money in a normal game. The first four questions are worth $100, the second four are worth $200 and the rest until the end of the game are worth $400. The "Red Light Challenge" is worth $500.

== Record payouts ==
The current record of money won on one ride is held by Sam Meyer (riding solo, on a Double Ride, taking and winning the Double-or-Nothing Video Bonus question), who won $6,200 on the episode that aired May 18, 2009. This topped the old record held by contestants Sean Devney and Steve Irolla, two New York City tour guides who won $4,100 after answering the "Video Bonus" question correctly. They reached their final destination with two strikes (both on $200 questions).

== Special editions ==
One episode of the program was a special celebrity edition, featuring actor Thomas Haden Church of Spider-Man 3, NHL players Jed Ortmeyer and Ryan Hollweg of the New York Rangers and journalist Harry Smith, formerly of CBS' The Early Show. All played for a charity of their choice, and Discovery Channel matched the contestants' winnings. Another episode was a special in which the passengers were asked questions relating to the 2008 film Frost/Nixon. In this episode, the host of Cash Cab: Canada, Adam Growe, was driving the cab instead of Ben Bailey.

On April 21, 2009, Discovery aired a charity episode of Cash Cab for its 250th episode featuring two rides by boat crew members from Deadliest Catch. Time Bandit co-captain Andy Hillstrand and Josh Harris, son of Cornelia Marie captain Phil Harris, went against Sig Hansen (captain of the Northwestern) and his two brothers. All cash values were doubled from the Season 3 payouts, the passengers received a second Street Shout-Out, and all money earned was donated by the passengers to the charities of their choice.

In the Cash Cab: Las Vegas episodes, filmed in May 2010 and broadcast beginning in August of that year, celebrities played for charity and ordinary contestants played for themselves. Guests have included Mayor of Las Vegas Oscar Goodman, comedian David Brenner, the band Neon Trees, and magicians Penn & Teller. The prizes are sometimes doubled in a "Double Down Ride," as on the regular show.

On December 4, 2017, Discovery aired a special Celebrity Edition, where the unsuspecting passengers hailed the Cash Cab, and were joined by celebrities helping them, featuring NCIS: New Orleans actor Scott Bakula, comedian Gilbert Gottfried, and Friends actor Matthew Perry.

== Cash Cab: Chicago ==
During Season 6 of Cash Cab, a new spin-off series, Cash Cab: Chicago, hosted by comedian Beth Melewski and using the same rules as its New York counterpart, aired. The spin-off was cancelled after one season, but rerun episodes are aired along with Cash Cab episodes in syndication. Ben Bailey stated that the show was created during contract renewal negotiations.

== Production ==
A support van tails the Cash Cab, containing producers and a camera crew for the various street shots. The staff provides logistical information and questions by way of a radio earpiece worn by the host. The Cash Cab is equipped with ten cameras: one on the host, three on the passengers, one pointing forward from the back window of the cab, and three (front, left, and right) in the advertising shell on the roof of the cab showing the passing streetscape. The rear of the cab behind the seats contains ten recording decks and other production equipment.

The lighting and the music that go off when contestants enter the cab consist of a switchboard that is connected to an iPod and the car stereo. The Video Bonus monitor is a DVD player that is embedded in the back of the front passenger seat.

Some contestants are randomly picked as they walk along the sidewalk, while others are selected in advance. Even so, those picked in advance are told that the cab is supposed to take them to the show on which they will appear. The cab turns out to be the show itself.

Near the end of the game at the player's destination, Bailey appears to present the cash won. In reality, this cash is a prop and used for on-air purposes only. The winnings, which must be taxed, are sent via check.

The Cash Cab in New York is a Toyota Sienna minivan.

== Broadcast syndication ==
As of March 2017, reruns previously aired on Cozi TV and on Game Show Network. The New York City version reruns air on the Quest network in the UK. On October 26, 2009, MGM Television announced that the reruns would begin airing on local stations in September 2010. Stations are allowed the option to air the series as a daily strip or as a weekend series. Game Show Network aired the original N.Y.C.-based series from March 13, 2017 to August 1, 2021, then returned those reruns to its lineup on June 18, 2022.

== Accolades ==
Bailey has been nominated four times for the Daytime Emmy Award for Outstanding Game Show Host, winning the award in 2010, 2011, and 2013. Cash Cab won the Daytime Emmy Award for Outstanding Game Show in 2008, 2009, and 2010. In 2013, the show appeared in TV Guide's list of the 60 greatest game shows ever.

== See also ==
- Taxicab Confessions
- BrainRush

Preceded by The Price Is Right	Daytime Emmy Award for Outstanding Game/Audience Participation Show; 2008–2010	Succeeded by Jeopardy! and Wheel of Fortune (tie)
