= Martin Zounar =

Czech actor and TV personality (born 1967)

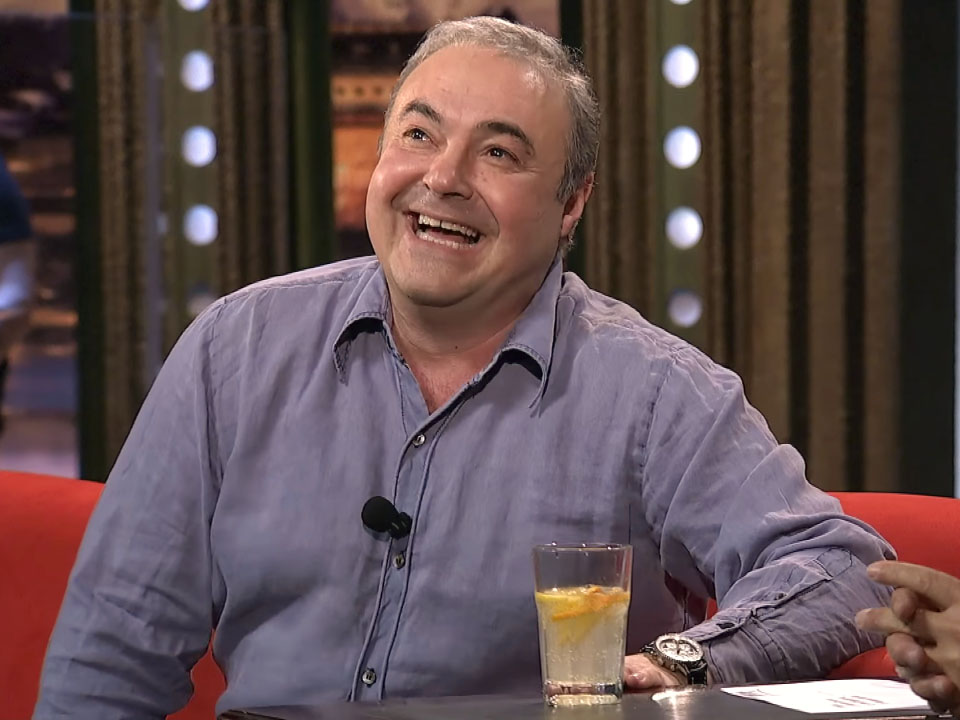
- Martin Zounar in a 2017 TV show
- Born: 26 May 1967 (age 59); Hradec Králové, Czechoslovakia
- Occupation: Actor
- Years active: 1984–present

Martin Zounar (born 26 May 1967) is a Czech actor and TV personality. He first gained national fame as the young soldier Tomáš in the TV series Chlapci a chlapi. Some of his other roles include the films, Pták Ohnivák, Vesklák and a number of TV shows such as Přístav, Velmi křehké vztahy, Rodinná pouta and Ordinace v růžové zahradě 2. Martin Zounar is the son of accomplished Czech actor Miroslav Zounar.
