= Adam Growe =

Canadian comedian

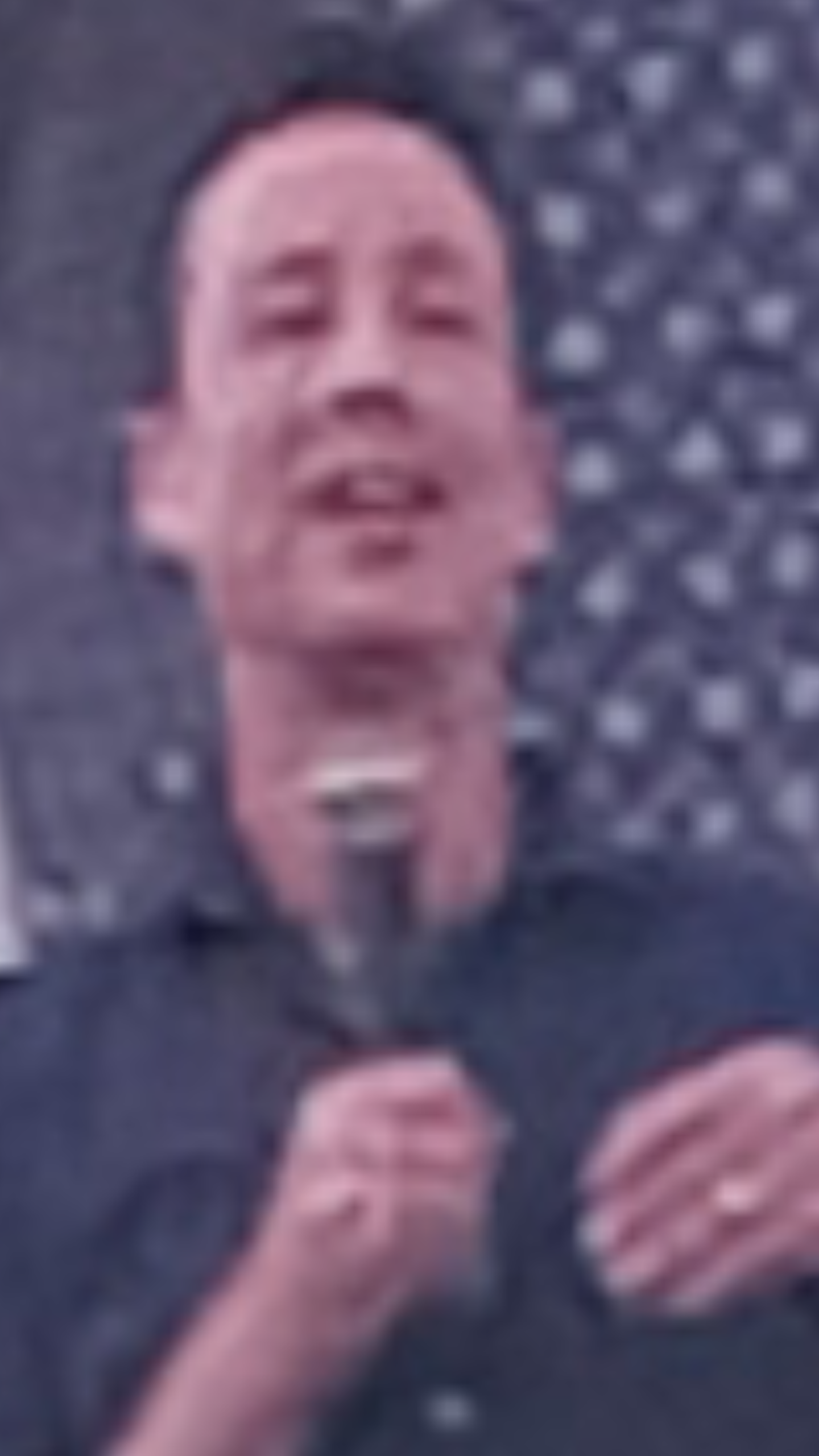
Growe in 2020

Adam Growe (born July 21, 1967) is a Canadian comedian, and the host of the Canadian version of Cash Cab and its 2024 reboot, Cash Cab Music.

Born in New York, but raised in Vancouver, he has been performing professionally on radio, television, and stage for over 20 years. Once a full-time morning DJ, Growe has since transitioned into stand-up comedy and television. He moved to Toronto, and successfully auditioned for Cash Cab in 2008. Before the show began filming, Growe went through taxi school to become a licensed taxi driver. He hosted the show for eight years until its conclusion in 2015, and returned to host its reboot Cash Cab Music in 2024.

While shooting Cash Cab, he made his theatrical debut with Adam Growe's The Mom and Pop Shop, a hit one-man show at the 2008 Toronto Fringe Festival. In 2013, he began touring his live trivia stage show The Adam Growe Quiz Show. He played Superintendent McClellan in the television series Monster Warriors.

Growe has starred in his own Just for Laughs Gala and Comedy Now! segment. He also appeared on Comedy Central's Premium Blend, CBS' Star Search and CBC's Comics!.

Currently, he can be heard on Boom 97.3 fm out of Toronto.
