= Ben Bailey =

American comedian, game show host (born 1970)

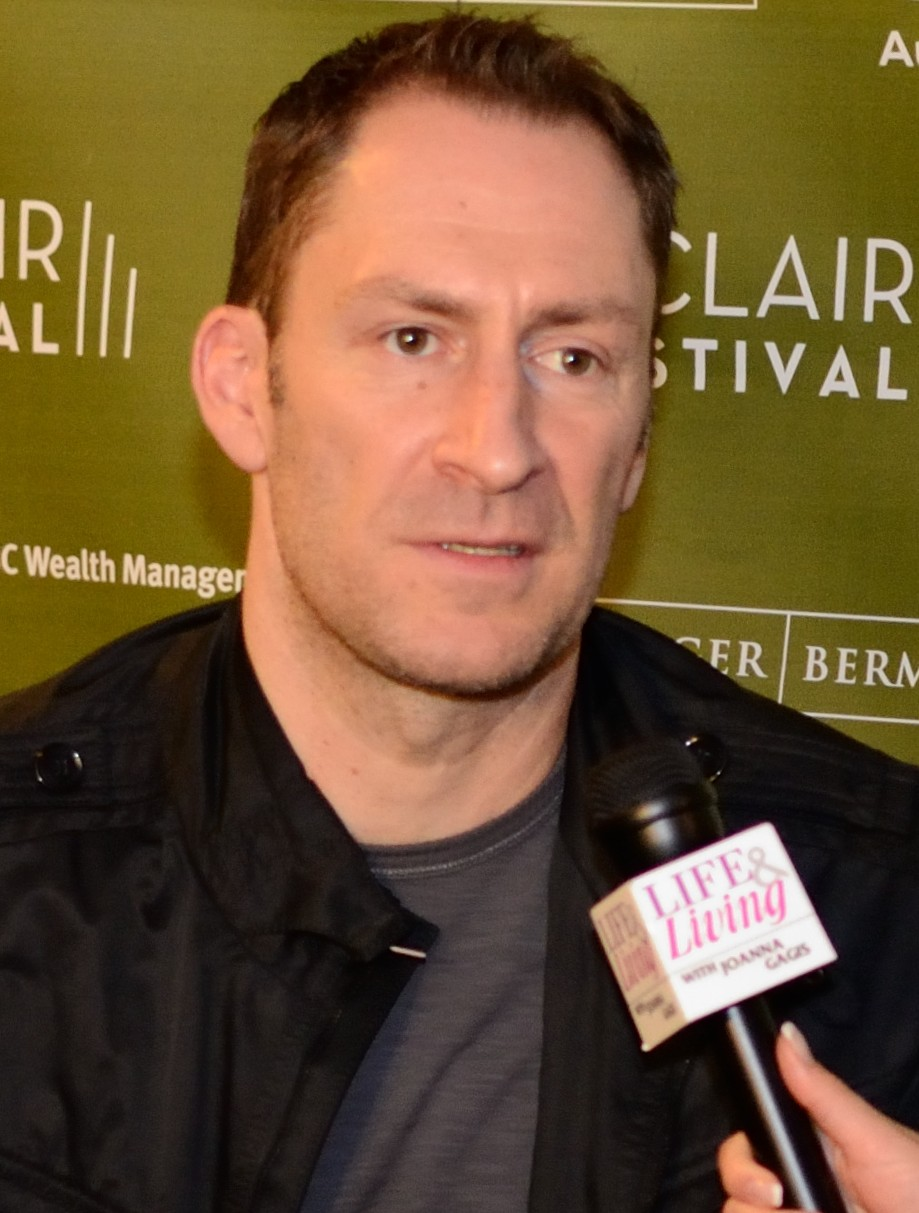
- Bailey at the 2012 premiere of Bad Parents
- Born: Benjamin Ray Bailey; October 30, 1970 (age 56); Bowling Green, Kentucky, U.S.
- Notable work: Host and executive producer of Cash Cab
- Children: 2

Comedy career
- Years active: 1993–present
- Medium: Television, stand-up
- Genres: Observational comedy, satire
- Subjects: Everyday life, self-deprecation, marriage, pop culture

YouTube information
- Channel: Ben Bailey Comedy
- Years active: 2014–present
- Genres: comedy, podcast
- Subscribers: 33.2 thousand
- Views: 6.8 million
- Website: https://www.therealbenbailey.com/

Benjamin Ray Bailey (born October 30, 1970) is an American comedian best known as the host of the game show Cash Cab. He also does stand-up comedy, and as an actor has appeared in some films and television shows. He has received multiple Daytime Emmy nominations including three wins for Outstanding Game Show Host, as the host of Cash Cab.

== Early life ==
Bailey was born in Bowling Green, Kentucky, and raised in Chatham Borough, New Jersey. During his youth Bailey was a member of his local Fish & Game Club, where he was a county champion swimmer and diver. In interviews he has stated that he was often the "comic relief" in his family, especially as a kid, helping ease tension. He graduated in 1988 from Chatham Borough High School.

Bailey attended Old Dominion University in Norfolk, Virginia, where he majored in liberal arts; he left a semester before graduation to move to Los Angeles in 1993.

== Career ==
=== Stand-up career ===
According to Bailey, he was telling stories with some comedians after hours at The Comedy Store (where he worked as a bartender and bouncer) when Skip E. Lowe, who was emceeing at the club, found his stories humorous and offered him an opportunity to perform stand-up. Bailey soon returned to the East Coast, where he gained popularity at comedy clubs in New York City. He has since performed at major festivals such as Just for Laughs and the Edinburgh Fringe Festival. As of 2019, he toured as a headliner.

During the COVID-19 lockdowns, Bailey streamed his comedy show Work from Home to YouTube, with his girlfriend as co-host and producer. He filmed the show in his basement.

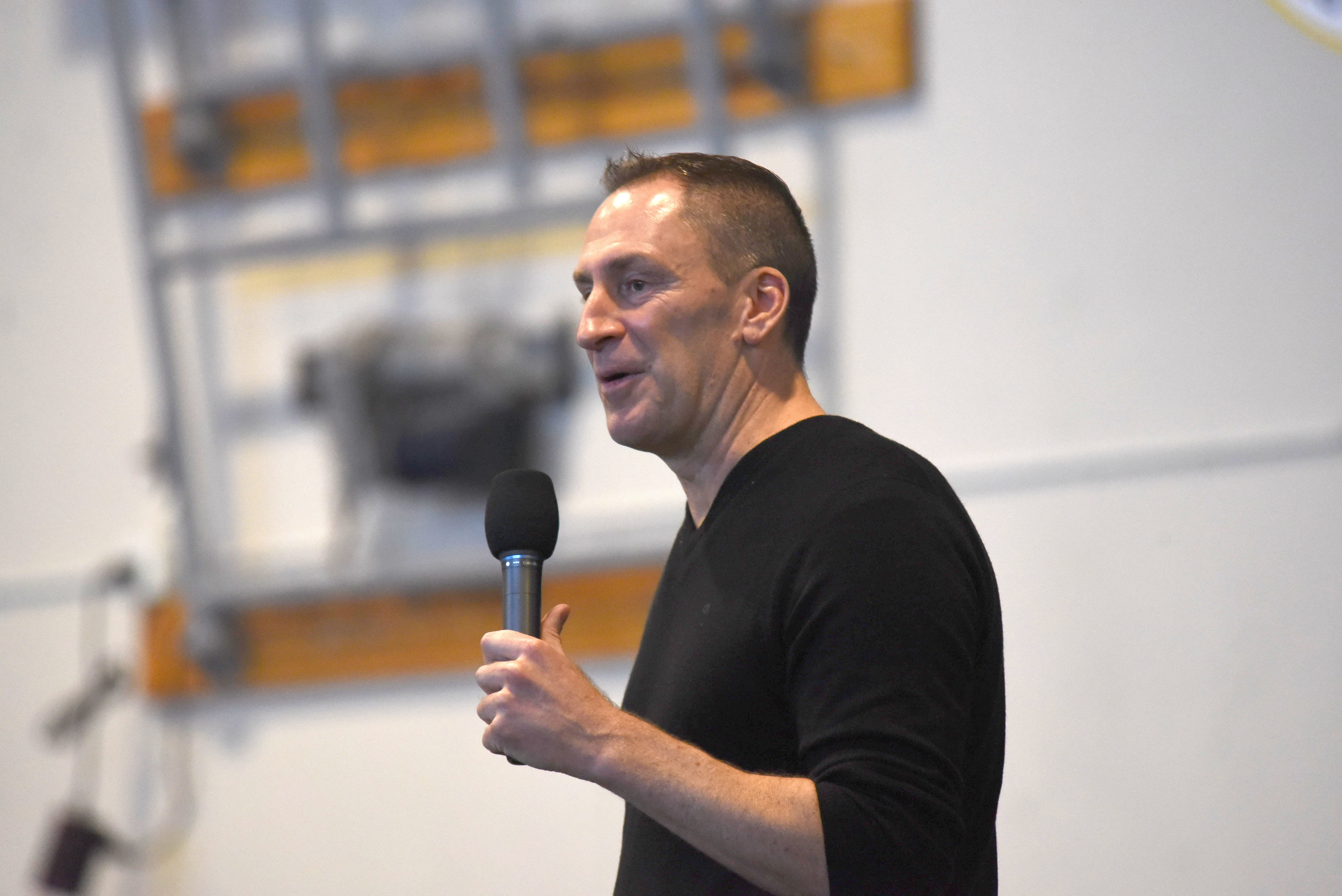
Bailey in 2017 performing a comedy show at Schriever Air Force Base

In 2006, he starred in his first special on Comedy Central, Comedy Central Presents Ben Bailey. In 2011, he released a two-part special, Road Rage and Accidental Ornithology. In 2016, he released Ben Bailey Live & Uncensored and in 2024, he released the Please Tell Me What I Said special on his YouTube channel.

=== Cash Cab and other endeavors ===
Bailey was the host and producer of the American version of Cash Cab, a TV game show played in a taxicab that Bailey drives around New York City, broadcast on the Discovery Channel and Bravo. He hosted the show for all of its 14 seasons, including its initial run from 2005 to 2012, as well as its return from 2017 to 2020. He also hosted the short-lived 2007 spin off Cash Cab After Dark.

Bailey also appeared on the new Shovio.com's TalkBackTV. He narrated the Discovery Channel's series Smash Lab. From 2011 to 2012, he was the host of Who's Still Standing? on NBC; the show was not renewed for a second season due to high production costs.

He has also appeared in ABC's The Knights of Prosperity, Hope & Faith, NBC's Law and Order SVU, and Fox's Mad TV, and has also appeared in Blue Bloods, 30 Rock, with a recurring role on One Life to Live. In 2019 he made a cameo appearance as himself in the seventh episode of the show Perpetual Grace, LTD where drives the cash cab.

He has appeared on talk shows such as The Tonight Show, The Today Show, Oprah, Rachel Ray, Good Day New York, and numerous morning/radio shows nationwide.

Bailey has had several film appearances, most notably in Bad Parents. He was also set to appear in The Amazing Spider-Man (2012), but his scene was cut from the final film.

He has done television commercials for ALDI and Michigan electric/natural gas company DTE Energy .

From 2022 to 2023 Bailey hosted Money Grab in the Cab, a show very similar to Cash Cab, in which he drove around giving farmers 10 minutes to answer as many questions as they could in order to earn money for their local FFA chapter.

In 2023 Bailey appeared in The Game Show Show, a documentary about the history of game shows.

In 2025 Bailey partnered with the Kansas City Chiefs to create a video special titled "The Chiefs Cab" which was inspired by Cash Cab. In the special Bailey drives around members of the Chiefs organization and asks them questions.

== Personal life ==
Bailey lives in Morristown, New Jersey. He met his ex-wife, Laurence, in a pub in Morristown in the 1990s. The couple married in 1997 and divorced in 2012. They have two children.

Bailey is a licensed taxi driver in New York City.

== Awards and nominations ==
Year	Award	Category	Work	Result
2007	Daytime Emmy	Outstanding Game Show Host	Cash Cab	Nominated
2008	Daytime Emmy	Outstanding Game Show Host	Cash Cab	Nominated
2008	Daytime Emmy	Outstanding Game Show (shared)	Cash Cab	Won
2009	Daytime Emmy	Outstanding Game Show Host	Cash Cab	Nominated
2009	Daytime Emmy	Outstanding Game Show (shared)	Cash Cab	Won
2010	Daytime Emmy	Outstanding Game Show Host	Cash Cab	Won
2010	Daytime Emmy	Outstanding Game Show (shared)	Cash Cab	Won
2011	Daytime Emmy	Outstanding Game Show Host	Cash Cab	Won
2012	Daytime Emmy	Outstanding Game Show Host	Cash Cab	Nominated
2012	Daytime Emmy	Outstanding Game Show (shared)	Cash Cab	Nominated
2013	Daytime Emmy	Outstanding Game Show Host	Cash Cab	Won
2013	Daytime Emmy	Outstanding Game Show (shared)	Cash Cab	Nominated

== Filmography ==
Television
Year	Title	Role	Info
2002	MadTV	Security guard	
2002	Late Friday	Guest appearance	
2002	Platinum Blend	Guest appearance	
2003	Tough Crowd with Colin Quinn	Guest appearance	
2003	Law & Order: Special Victims Unit	Transit Sergeant Ambrose	
2004	Hope and Faith	Eddie Vanderbeek	
2004	Last Call with Carson Daly	Guest appearance	
2005-2020	Cash Cab	Host and executive producer	(458 episodes)
2005	One Life to Live	Haskell	(4 episodes)
2006	Comedy Central Presents	Himself	TV special
2007	Cash Cab After Dark	Host	(13 episodes)
2007	The Knights of Prosperity	Ralph Carnucci	
2007	The Big Idea with Donny Deutsch	Guest appearance	
2008	Smash Lab	Narrator	
2009	After the Catch	Host	(5 episodes)
2010	The Oprah Winfrey Show	Guest appearance	
2010	30 Rock	Himself	
2011	Ben Bailey Road Rage	Himself	TV special
2011	The Tonight Show with Jay Leno	Guest appearance	(2 episodes)
2011	Best in the Business	Host	TV miniseries
2011-2012	Who's Still Standing	Host	(6 episodes)
2012	Big Morning Buzz Live	Guest panelist	
2014-2015	Brain Games	Self	(2 episodes)
2016	Deadliest Catch The Bait	Self	
2016	Unforgettable	Lorenzo Abrelli	
2016	The Other F Word	Brian	
2012-2017	Racheal Ray	Guest appearance	(2 episodes)
2018	Caroline & Friends	Guest appearance	
2018	Kill Tony	Guest host	
2019	Perpetual Grace, LTD	Himself	
2021	Blue Bloods	Emmet Fells	
2022-2023	Money Grab in a Cab	Host	(15 episodes)
2023	The Game Show Show	Self	(2 episodes)
2024	Sherri	Guest appearance	

Film
Year	Title	Role	Info
2004	Bad Meat	Agent 1	
2005	They're Made Out of Meat	Dexter	Short
2007	Don't Shoot The Pharmacist	Zach Wright	
2012	Bad Parents	Graham	
2013	Delivery Man	Himself	Uncredited
