= Cash Cab (British game show) =

- Genre: Game show
- Created by: Adam Wood; Mat Steiner
- Presented by: John Moody
- Voices of: Annabel Raftery
- Country of origin: United Kingdom
- Original language: English
- No. of series: 2
- No. of episodes: 40

Production
- Running time: 30 minutes (inc. adverts)
- Production company: Lion Television

Original release
- Network: ITV (2005–06); Challenge (2007)
- Release: 13 June 2005 – 30 March 2007

Related
- Cash Cab

Cash Cab is a British game show that originally aired from 13 June 2005 to 29 June 2006 on ITV. The remaining fourteen episodes of the second series aired on Challenge from 22 to 30 March 2007. It is hosted by John Moody, who is a qualified taxi driver, and questions were asked in voice over style by Annabel Raftery. The show was devised by Adam Wood and Mat Steiner.

== Gameplay ==
The show's host initially poses as an ordinary taxi driver and drives around the major cities of the United Kingdom in a cab. The show pays its passengers for correctly answering standard general knowledge questions. Contestants are recruited in advance but are not told that the quiz will be taking place in the cab, so although the "pick-ups" are not as random as they appear on screen, the contestants are genuinely surprised when the taxi turns out to be the Cash Cab.

The contestants tell the driver their destination before getting into the taxi and are not allowed to change it. They'll then have the distance they'll need to travel to answer questions. The first five questions are relatively easy and worth £10 each, the next five are a little harder and worth £50, the next seven, are even harder and worth £100, and any question after that is worth £500. Contestants are allowed to either phone someone or ask a passer-by for help if they are stuck on a question. If the contestant gets three questions wrong, they'll lose the money they have won up to that point and must leave the cab immediately.

== Transmissions ==
Series	Start date	End date	Episodes
1	13 June 2005	24 June 2005	20
1	5 September 2005	16 September 2005	20
2	27 December 2005	30 December 2005	20
2	28 June 2006	29 June 2006	20
2	22 March 2007	30 March 2007	20
