= Deadliest Catch season 6 =

Season of television series

Deadliest Catch
- Season 6
- Starring: Keith Colburn; Sig Hansen; Phil Harris; Andy Hillstrand; Johnathan Hillstrand
- No. of episodes: 16

Release
- Original network: Discovery Channel
- Original release: April 13 – July 27, 2010

Season chronology
- ← Previous; Season 5 Next → Season 7

The sixth season of the American reality television series Deadliest Catch commenced on the Discovery Channel in the United States on April 13, 2010, and concluded on July 27, 2010. The complete sixth season DVD was released in North America on November 2, 2010.

The season received high critical praise from critics, who commended its tasteful and intelligent handling of Captain Phil Harris' death and the series' emotionally powerful storytelling.

== Reception ==
=== Ratings ===
"Slow Burn", the season premiere, received at the time the highest number of American household viewers in the show's history. The record would be surpassed by later episodes in the season, such as "Blown Off Course", "Empty Throne" (5.24 million), "Cain and Abel" (5.26), and "Redemption Day" (8.5).

=== Critical response ===
The season received critical acclaim from critics, largely due to the emotional storyline involving Captain Phil Harris, who died in February 2010 after suffering from a stroke. Scott Von Doviak of The A.V. Club stated that due to the passing of Captain Harris prior to the season, episodes from the sixth season became "some of the most riveting and emotionally wrenching episodes of any reality series in TV history." Reviewing the season's DVD release, Paul Mavis of DVD Talk considered it to be "[t]he most emotionally involving season of the series so far." Michael Hann of The Guardian, while reviewing the box set release of the first ten seasons, gave high praise to season six, considering it "one of the most profoundly moving series of TV episodes I’ve ever seen".

In reviewing "Redemption Day", Matt Zoller Seitz of Salon.com praised the series' handling of Capt. Harris' passing "with intelligence and taste", stating that "[a]t no point did the series succumb to dumb voyeurism. We’ve seen little trace of the P. T. Barnum mentality that powers most unscripted programs. Quite the contrary: “Deadliest Catch” has brought old-school documentary sobriety to a genre more often known for shamelessness." Seitz concluded that "'Deadliest Catch' is a Trojan Horse reality show, smuggling integrity into a morally bankrupt genre.

=== Accolades ===
For the 63rd Primetime Emmy Awards, the series won Outstanding Reality Program for the first time. Among crew members, the series' cinematography team won Outstanding Cinematography for Reality Programming, Bob Bronow won Outstanding Sound Mixing for Nonfiction Programming, and Josh Earl, Kelly Coskran, and Alex Durham won Outstanding Picture Editing for Reality Programming, all for the episode "Redemption Day".

== Episodes ==
| No. overall | No. in season | Title | Original release date |
|---|---|---|---|
| 66 | 1 | "Slow Burn" | April 13, 2010 |
As the King Crab season begins, rumors of Captain Keith trying to recruit a Time Bandit deckhand bring him and Captain Johnathan to blows. The continued friction between Jake and Josh Harris on the Cornelia Marie and the growing ambition of Jake Anderson on Northwestern lead Captain Phil and Captain Sig to swap Jakes, so they can each experience another deck. A friend of the Hillstrand brothers, "Wild Bill" Wichrowski, returns to Alaska with the Kodiak after a 5-year absence to try his luck at crabbing again. Among his crew is former Time Bandit deckhand Russell. Not long after fishing begins, a small cod-fishing vessel, Carly Renee, capsizes near Dutch Harbor. All four crew are rescued alive, and the ship eventually runs aground and is stranded.
| 67 | 2 | "Breaking 'Em In" | April 20, 2010 |
The Cornelia Marie sees better fishing after a good-luck ritual by Samoan deckhand Freddy. The greenhorn on the Wizard, Joel Zeilie, is having physical difficulties going through the long grind of crab fishing. The Time Bandit heads to their Slime Banks fishing ground for the third time in as many seasons, and hit paydirt again in the face of superstition. Bad fishing and near-fatal rookie mistakes among the inexperienced crew of the Kodiak strain Captain Bill's nerves, eventually leading him to blow up at deck boss Adam. Captain Sig and his brother, deck boss Edgar, get into a conflict over how to run the deck.
| 68 | 3 | "Sea Tested" | April 27, 2010 |
Jake Harris gets to run the rail on his 24th birthday during another storm on the Northwestern. The next day he draws galley duty, having to deal with Edgar's hazing while trying to prepare breakfast. Jake Anderson gets to hook pots on the Cornelia Marie, but loses a bet with Freddy that he can pull 20 pots without missing one. He does well, though, earning the crew's respect. The Kodiak finds better fishing thanks to a tip from the Hillstrands, but runs out of bait, jeopardizing their season. The Wizard also runs out of bait, but not before the deck crew tries to extend it by recycling, drawing Captain Keith's ire.
| 69 | 4 | "Bering Sea Swim Club" | May 4, 2010 |
The Northwestern and Cornelia Marie swap Jakes back by throwing them in the Bering Sea by a crab pot buoy and picking them up by it. The crew of the Time Bandit has some fun as deckhand Scott takes some time behind the wheel to forget about drama back home. Later a stuck valve causes a bilge backup, and the Time Bandit crew works fast to avoid sinking. The Kodiak is forced to return to port short to offload, and a lot of their crab is deadloss. Despite surprisingly good performance, Captain Bill is forced to fire Russell in order to be able to afford to keep fishing. The Wizard reaches its quota and returns to port, with Captain Keith still brooding over the end of his friendship with the Hillstrands. Jake Anderson works hard to prove himself back on the Northwestern, but Jake Harris is again clashing with brother Josh on the Cornelia Marie.
| 70 | 5 | "Arctic Quest" | May 11, 2010 |
The Time Bandit draws good numbers in its last pots of the season and meets its quota, but must traverse the dangerous False Pass to get to their processor in Akutan. The Northwestern offloads its last king crab, then goes off to St. Matthew's Island to hunt blue king crab for an extra payday, but empty pots only bring regrets and drama. Captain Bill continues to suffer low crew morale on the Kodiak as they hit bad weather and continue to hit bad fishing. When deck boss Adam cops an attitude again, Bill has to lay down the law with him one last time. The Cornelia Marie is still suffering some bad fishing. When Jake Harris starts to get lazy and distracted, Captain Phil has to straighten out his more experienced son, ironically soon after praising him for the cameras. As the episode ends, the Time Bandit, top heavy with pots as it races for port, faces a rogue wave at False Pass...
| 71 | 6 | "False Pass" | May 18, 2010 |
The fleet experiences some of the worst king crab weather ever in the last few days of the season. Against better judgment, the Time Bandit navigates the treacherous False Pass in the storm, and make it through safely. The Northwestern continues to pull blanks attempting to hunt blue king crab. Things are no better when Edgar is briefly at the helm. After constant single-digit counts, Captain Sig finally gives up. Captain Keith's brother, Monte, takes the helm as the Wizard tries to hunt bairdi crab. They find unprecedented numbers of keepers and meet their quota quickly, but their greenhorn Joel keeps lagging. The Cornelia Marie is on its last strings in the brunt of the storm, and the crew works its hardest to get its last 20,000 pounds of crab. Things get worse when their generator goes out, but a quick fix gets them back running, and they race to get their pots up. The Kodiak is desperate to finish their quota, but their bad luck continues, and Captain Bill has to make one last trip to meet their quota. With the season over, the crews return to Dutch Harbor. The Northwestern earns $50,000 per deckhand on red king crab, while barely breaking even on blue king crab. The Time Bandit takes $32,000 per deckhand. The Wizard gets $31,000 per deckhand, but lets go of greenhorn Joel. On the Cornelia Marie, the crew plays the shoe polish prank on Captain Phil after earning $27,000 per deckhand. The Kodiak lingers to finish their quota as the other feature boats retire until the 2010 opilio crab season.
| 72 | 7 | "When Hell Freezes Over" | May 25, 2010 |
A very cold 2010 opilio crab season begins. The Time Bandit has hired Jeremy Shelton as a greenhorn, and he takes the early hazing very well. On the Northwestern, Edgar, who begins work on his 39th birthday, is suffering physically from years of abuse crabbing, putting Captain Sig in a tough position. The Cornelia Marie begins the season in a repair dock, needing to repair the hull, propellers and drive shafts after running aground on a reef. Paul Edgrin is the new greenhorn on the Wizard, and is already acquainted with Captain Keith. Captain Bill has something to prove, and three new deckhands, on the Kodiak after a terrible king crab season. The Northwestern gets a head start, but freezing spray forces the crew to drop all their pots early. The other boats who leave later quickly ice over, and have to begin chipping ice and dumping pots very quickly. The Time Bandit doesn't bother baiting their first few strings. Jeremy is incredibly seasick. The Kodiak makes it to its target grounds, but the frozen-over stack creates a challenge. When the Wizard reaches its grounds, the weather reminds Keith of a year previous, when he nearly lost his crew to a rogue wave, so he makes sure the crew is extra careful. The Cornelia Marie finally gets underway, but when they get to their grounds after an overnight cruise, their pots are heavily iced over. Jake volunteers to hang off the edge of the stack to hammer the ice off the sides of the stack.
| 73 | 8 | "We're Not in Kansas Anymore..." | June 1, 2010 |
The boats continue to clear gear after a bad case of freezing spray, dumping gear as fast as possible. When they begin pulling gear, both the Northwestern and Time Bandit find themselves on schools of bairdi crab instead of opilio, forcing them to empty their pots in the Bering Sea and move them elsewhere. To make matters worse on the Northwestern, Jake Anderson accidentally cuts his wrist, joining Edgar on the injured list. On the Wizard, Captain Keith is worried about the performance of greenhorn Paul, wanting a greenhorn to actually last through a full season for once. On the Kodiak, numbers are actually good for once, but one of the greenhorns, Clint, is messing things up. Captain Bill warns deck boss Adam to get the greenhorn in gear, or he'll find a replacement at Saint Paul. The Cornelia Marie's first string is bone dry. This wears quickly on Captain Phil, who is suffering three crushed discs in his back. On the Time Bandit, in addition to pulling the wrong kind of crab, greenhorn Jeremy is suffering debilitating seasickness, as his friend, Scott Hillstrand, tries to work him through it.
| 74 | 9 | "Glory Days" | June 8, 2010 |
On the Northwestern, both deck boss Edgar and injured deckhand Jake Anderson are bumming as Captain Sig grinds the entire crew relentlessly. Eventually, Jake can take no more with his injured hand, and walks off the deck, putting his career in jeopardy. On the Cornelia Marie, Captain Phil heads to the "Rock Pile", a very tricky ground that made him famous early in his career. Although his first two strings miss, the third string finds its mark and the boat stuffs its tanks. While moving its pots to a new ground, the Time Bandit starts listing starboard due to freezing spray, and water gets into the rusted rails and the fuel tanks. They manage to filter the water out of the fuel and get their pots cast off to eliminate the list. Greenhorn Jeremy finally makes it on deck to begin working, but after a long bout of seasickness his mind isn't into it, and he eventually gives up. On the Wizard, the crew plays a prank on greenhorn Paul, who has been lagging, by locking him into a pot and taking him for a ride on the crane. But with bad fishing at the time, Captain Keith doesn't appreciate the timing of the prank. One night, a call comes over the radio as a deckhand on the cod vessel Alaskan Leader has a heart attack, but bad weather stymies medevac efforts by the Coast Guard.
| 75 | 10 | "The Darkened Seas" | June 15, 2010 |
The fate of the fallen deckhand on the Alaskan Leader hangs in the balance as the Coast Guard must wait several hours before finally medevacing the man to Anchorage by way of Saint Paul. After spending several days fighting freezing spray and ice, the crew of the Time Bandit begins pulling up decent numbers. Warmer weather makes deck conditions hazardous as large chunks of ice fall from the deck crane. On the Northwestern, Captain Sig attempts a dangerous nighttime transit of the narrow break-water into St. Paul harbor in order to offload. While in port, Jake Anderson goes to the island clinic and returns to the boat with a splint on his hand, putting his future on the boat in question. After leaving the harbor, Jake calls one of his sisters while on wheel watch to talk about his father, who has been missing for three weeks. Captain Sig gets the call saying that Jake's father's car was found abandoned on a remote logging road, letting the secret out. The Cornelia Marie finishes their record string on the 'Rock Pile' and steam for St. Paul. Along the way, Captain Phil begins to experience pain and 'strange sensations'. Unable to bear it any longer, he briefly abandons the wheelhouse to go down to his cabin, the captain's stateroom, for a pain pill. Phil discovers his youngest son, Jake, in his cabin in the act of stealing Phil's medication. Angry and emotionally hurt over this turn of events, Phil tells Jake, "a liar and a thief", to get out of his life. Jake begs for his forgiveness, claiming that he is "sick". Phil begins to realize that this was more than a simple case of theft and asks Jake in what way he is sick, with Jake admitting that he has a drug addiction.
| 76 | 11 | "Blown Off Course" | June 22, 2010 |
After Jake Harris revealed his addiction to Captain Phil on the Cornelia Marie, he swore he would go to rehab when the season was over. Phil told Jake that he had to get help in order to save himself, and swore his support. On the Time Bandit Captains Johnathan and Andy contemplate their future. Johnathan in particular is starting to ponder retirement, and has decided to take three weeks off. Believing Johnathan's son, Scott, will eventually captain the boat, they agree he is not yet ready. They decide instead to train Mike Fourtner as a relief captain, due to his greater knowledge and experience. On the Wizard, bad fishing causes Captain Keith to resume using chewing tobacco, which he promised his children he would give up. It is right then that Keith's 11-year-old daughter calls and he admits to her that she caught him red-handed. Keith gets a gentle chastising and pep-talk from his daughter while the camera zooms in on several reminders she had made for him around the wheelhouse, renewing his resolve to quit. He remarks after hanging up that she is 11 going on 21. On the Northwestern, the fate of Jake Anderson's father still weighs on his mind. Eventually, Captain Sig tells him to call his mother, who relates the news she earlier told Sig that his father's truck was found, but he is nowhere to be seen. On the Cornelia Marie, Captain Phil ponders Jake Harris' addiction on the steam to Saint Paul, seeing a lot of his own formative years in his younger son. He determines that Jake must put aside hard living for hard work to do what Phil knows he is capable of; one day taking over the business. Later, at Saint Paul as they offload, Phil shares some old family photos with Josh and Jake, putting the earlier confrontation with Jake aside for the moment and remembering happier times when the boys were young children. Phil then retires to his stateroom before the offload is complete. When offload is complete, engineer Steve Ward is unable to reach Phil on the shipboard phone, so he goes up to the wheelhouse to get Phil's signature. Finding it empty, Steve checks down in Phil's stateroom and finds him collapsed on the floor. Phil has suffered a massive stroke, unable to move the left side of his body but still conscious. Jake breaks down as paramedics work on him, then move him off the boat by crane before loading him into an ambulance. Josh rides with his father to the island's care center, certain to be medevaced later.
| 77 | 12 | "Empty Throne" | June 29, 2010 |
All quiet on the Cornelia Marie as the crew heads to the clinic 2 hours after Captain Phil's stroke. He's going to be medevaced to Anchorage with Jake, as Josh begins planning for the boat finishing its season without him. Josh later gets an update from Jake, who tells him that Phil will have a portion of skull removed to relieve the pressure. While seeking advice, Josh talks with Deckhand Freddy Maughtai, who urges Josh to fly down to Anchorage and be with Phil and Jake. Josh, however, feels that his father would want him to take care of the Cornelia Marie, his legacy, in his absence and that he owes his old man to do so. Freddy tells him that if Phil dies and he isn't there, he will regret it for the rest of this life. "Season every year... crab every year... Dad, no. There's only one Dad, bro. The crab is always catch. We always make money, every year. But we cannot catch a Dad every year." Freddy reveals how his own father died in the hospital in Australia while he was out during an opilio season with Phil; his aunt called to inform him, and he went home not seeing his father but a dead body. He leaves Josh with his thoughts, making his decisions much harder. The Time Bandit begins pulling a new string as Captain Andy starts training Mike Fourtner as a relief captain. His first string of five pots doesn't bring up good numbers. On the Northwestern, Jake Anderson is torn between wanting to go search for his missing father, and his family desiring him to remain on his boat. The crew suffers a near-miss when a pot snaps free of the crane, and Jake is able to save the pot, but Sig admonishes him to let it go next time in case a hook is swinging free. Sig doesn't mind having to buy another pot in such a situation; his crew's safety is worth more than any pot. On the Kodiak, the crew finally sees good numbers as they approach their first opilio delivery date. But the crew is being dragged down by deckhand Clint, and Wild Bill has to put him in his place. Despite early counting issues, they hit their first delivery with crab to spare, and Wild Bill gives his crew some shore leave, only requesting that they don't have any hard liquor. He's worried Clint won't make the midnight curfew, but the entire crew misses it, and it's Jake that has the issues in the morning, not Clint. The first evening after Phil's stroke, Josh begins notifying the crews, telling Captain Andy first. Andy relays it to Johnathan, in case he's passing through Anchorage on the way stateside. When Sig finds out from Andy, he throws his cigarettes away across the wheelhouse in a fit of anger. Andy and Sig inform their crews; Jake Anderson takes it particularly hard, knowing what the Harris boys are going through possibly losing their father. Sig passes it on to Captain Keith, who breaks down upon hearing the news. Josh finally decides to fly to Anchorage, where Captain Johnathan, who went to the hospital after being informed by Andy, picks him at the airport and takes him there to join Jake.
| 78 | 13 | "Cain and Abel" | July 6, 2010 |
After 12 hours of surgery, the neurosurgeon who worked on Phil Harris has a grim prognosis as he shows the results to Josh, Jake, and Johnathan Hillstrand. Although survivable, the location of the stroke makes a fatal complication possible, and he anticipates a very long road to recovery. On the Northwestern, Jake Anderson continues to ponder his missing father as the rest of the crew deals with broken bodies. The crew takes a break to celebrate Jake's six months of sobriety from a situation pre-season. Their next delivery date is jeopardized as they hit a nursery and draw low numbers of keepers. Edgar Hansen feels the job is killing him, and is feeling the end of his career drawing closer with each grind. Sig overhears Edgar's personal concerns, and thinks if he's close to quitting, he should get serious about training a replacement. Sig thinks Edgar's problem is that he's the one everybody goes to on the deck. The Wizard grinds through ice on the north side of the crab grounds to get some ice-covered strings pulled. Frequent calls from his daughter try to keep Captain Keith in line regarding kicking his tobacco habit. The crew gets breakfast as Keith and Monte try to work through the ice. Keith sees a seal. They find clear ice, and their pots. They also manage good numbers, convincing them to gamble and keep fishing there. The Kodiak returns to the grounds and takes to its soaking pots. The numbers are outrageously good, and the crew is finally clicking. But when the numbers dry up, some pots show they weren't properly secured, allowing crab to escape. Wild Bill chews out his crew after the string, then calls in reinforcements, prepared to fire one of his crew if things don't shape up. On the Time Bandit, Captain Andy is losing focus with his brother keeping watch over Captain Phil. The crew pulls crab pots in −30°F weather, conditions cold enough to make the crab fall apart before they get in the tank. To make it worse, everyone is sniping on Mike Fourtner, since he's being groomed for the captain's chair. A day after surgery, with more friends in town, Captain Phil is making progress, and is breathing on his own again. He manages to be able to speak as well, and cons Jake into giving him an ice chip early. Three days after surgery, those around him are really feeling down with his vulnerable condition. Josh and Jake are regularly arguing about things, with Jake seeing Josh as being more concerned about the Cornelia Marie than their father, but Josh seeing Jake as drowning his sorrow in alcohol and drugs and not really caring about anything. Johnathan just happens to come up to the brothers hotel room and catches most of the shouted argument through the door, which saddens him as he goes back down to the lobby. Jake leaves the hotel angry, and Johnathan talks with Josh. Meanwhile, Derrick Ray takes over as relief captain on the Cornelia Marie, and the boat finally gets back underway.
| 79 | 14 | "Redemption Day" | July 13, 2010 |
The show begins with Captain Johnathan calling Captain Andy with positive news on Captain Phil's progress. Andy passes it throughout the fleet to their excitement. After Jake and Josh Harris's confrontation in the previous episode, Josh goes to Captain Johnathan for advice. Johnathan tells Josh just to be there for Phil and deal with his business himself; he may feel that Jake is also his responsibility, but it really isn't. Back on the Time Bandit, Mike Fourtner's jitters with the hook continue, and Scotty Hillstrand is eager to prove himself in Mike's place. On the Northwestern, bad numbers continue to lengthen their grind, which only makes the crew miserable and long for home. In Anchorage, the neurologist tells Josh to begin making preparations to move Phil to a rehab facility in Seattle, though the actual move is still some time away as they wait for the rest of his swelling to go down. Bad numbers are plaguing the Kodiak, and deckhand Clint continues to be seen as a thorn in the crew's side. Wild Bill, tired of the crew as a whole, makes a call ahead to hire a new deckhand. The Time Bandit goes to a new prospect string, where Scotty proves no better at the hook than Mike. Captain Andy's gamble on a deeper string is an utter bust. Andy and Neal determine that making the crew hate the Captain is better than allowing the crew to turn on each other. In Anchorage, Jake Harris broods over his demons, and calls a substance abuse clinic in Seattle to admit himself into rehab. He goes to Phil to tell him. Phil is proud of his son for finally getting the help he needs. Captain Johnathan and Josh take him to the airport to fly home to Seattle. A storm brews in the Bering Sea, and the Northwestern hopes to finally catch some luck. Ready for a break, Edgar begins to train Jake Anderson on the hydros. After a good amount of luck, he finally slips a pot out of the dogs, and it slides into the crab table without toppling. In Dutch, the Kodiak offloads another 210,000 pounds of crab, and picks up a new deckhand, Randy. But he talks to the crew before Wild Bill actually fired somebody to make room. After finishing the offload, Wild Bill fires Clint to make room for Randy. In Anchorage, Phil tells Josh he regrets not being there as much as he wanted to, but Josh shows no regrets for his upbringing as he says that Phil taught him everything that he needed to know to be a man. During their exchange, Josh breaks down and has to step out, not wanting his dad to see him cry. On another day, Phil asks Josh to go get his good-luck bracelet from his hotel room when he returns in the evening. As a furious arctic storm pounds the fishing grounds, Phil deteriorates rapidly, and Josh is summoned to the hospital. Despite doctors' best efforts, Phil succumbs to complications of his stroke. Captain Phil Harris; December 19, 1956 – February 9, 2010
| 80 | 15 | "Valhalla" | July 20, 2010 |
As the storm rages through the crab grounds, hauling pots gets really complicated on the Northwestern. As numbers dwindle and weather worsens, the risk outweighs the reward and Captain Sig gives up, willing to take being up to 4,000 pounds short over losing some or all of his crew. In Saint Paul, where the Cornelia Marie is still preparing to get underway, Freddy Maugatai is in the wheelhouse when Josh Harris calls to pass along the news that Captain Phil had died. Breaking down, he heads into the engine room to inform the rest of the crew, and he and Steve Ward share a moment of tearful consolation. An eerie calm passes over the crab grounds, and the captains, who don't know of Phil's fate yet, express their concerns. Most northern of the ships right now, the Kodiak works in frigid conditions in an attempt to fish the edge of the ice pack. Although Wild Bill doesn't regret getting rid of deckhand Clint, having two new deckhands doesn't help when the air temperature is −40 °F/C and visibility is 15 feet. Poor returns from the pots prompt a northward trek. Due to the freezing temperatures, the hydraulic system onboard develops a problem. Deck boss Adam shuts down the hydraulic system for repairs, inadvertently endangering the oblivious crew above when a pot suspended from the now-paralyzed deck crane swings uncontrollably before it can be tethered. The broken hydraulic line is replaced and fishing continues. The Time Bandit needs to fill two of its three tanks in the next 48 hours. The crew seems to be working better, and the numbers improve as well, giving hope that they will make the next delivery. Jeremy hauls bait hard, and Captain Andy decides to teach him how to throw buoys. But his arms are so sore, he can't throw them very far, and one gets caught on the rail, potentially endangering the boat. To the west of Saint Paul, the Wizard sees good fishing along the ice pack. The problem is, Captain Keith sees the crew getting nonchalant about their jobs. He comes down from the wheelhouse to give them a pep talk, telling them to speed up the process so they can plug the tanks and get back in. Deckhand Lynn Guitard continues to lag behind and gets messy with tying up the stack, prompting an additional talking-to from Keith at the wheelhouse window. The Northwestern gets into Saint Paul early, 10 hours before its delivery time. After some downtime with the crew, Captain Sig goes to the Cornelia Marie to introduce himself to relief captain Derrick Ray. It is here that he finds out that Captain Phil is gone; it was the same evening Derrick found out. The galley of the Northwestern is somber after Sig relays the news to his crew, who fights their emotions. The word spreads quickly from there through the crews. As the Northwestern leaves, they slowly pass the Cornelia Marie. Jake Anderson breaks down as they salute the boat. Andy comments that it's time to retire his American flag on the Time Bandit; the storm has ripped it into a barely recognizable tangle of fibers. He compares it to the season in general. In Seattle, Phil's family gathers for his funeral service. Among the mourners with Jake and Josh are their mother and Phil's father. His ashes are placed in two motorcycle fuel tanks. One is buried in Seattle at his funeral; Jake and Josh plan to spread his ashes from the other during the next King Crab season. The Time Bandit has a moment of silence. On the Northwestern, Sig mentions the tale that seagulls carry the spirits of lost sailors; he reckons that one sitting on the bow at that moment might just be Phil. On the Wizard, a tearful Keith oversees as the crew loads a full crab pot, packing its shot and buoys within so it stays on the bottom as a memorial, so Phil will always have a full pot to come back to. The Time Bandit memorializes Phil in their own typical style: by setting off their fireworks. The final shot sees the Wizard send their pot over as Keith tolls the ship's bell eight times.
| 81 | 16 | "Endless" | July 27, 2010 |
The boats make their final pushes of the painful 2010 opilio crab season. The Time Bandit replaces its torn-up U.S. flag. Their plan is to set gear one more time, pick up Captain Johnathan, then go pick their gear up. The Northwestern crew is finally beginning to break. The Cornelia Marie picks up Josh Harris, who is determined to finish the year, as Captain Phil would've wanted. On the Wizard, Captain Keith is concerned with plugging his tanks one more time to meet his quota. Wild Bill on the Kodiak is rushing through his gear, hoping to get one more set of strings pulled before the ice pack swallows them. He is gambling on only using the smaller orange diver pots on his final set of strings, to minimize the risk of the ice moving them. Once Captain Johnathan returns to the Time Bandit, he and Captain Andy deliberate on how big Mike's ego grew when he got a taste of the captain's chair. One night on the Northwestern, Captain Sig is unable to sleep, with Captain Phil on his mind. Edgar is long since over this season, and continues to train Jake Anderson on more aspects of the deck. They get good enough numbers to pack the pots away. Sig finally realizes that he'll need to eventually find a replacement for Edgar. Back on the Time Bandit, Mike and Scotty continue their feud. Andy fuels it by putting Scotty back on the rail. He snags the first buoy, but Mike drops it. Their first pot doesn't look promising, and it also falls out of the dogs. Later pots have better numbers, giving hope that this set of strings will be their last of the season. Captain Johnathan joins the deck crew to help sorting, and they clean house with a final total of $1.2 million. The Northwestern is officially on its final pots, finishing with a total of $990,000. To honor Captain Phil, they throw several flaming hooks for the final pot, which is totally stuffed with crab. As for the Kodiak, they have to cruise through the ice pack for the final set of 30 pots. He moves quickly through the gear hoping for good numbers. He gets the numbers he's looking for, and finally secures a good season. The gamble paid off, with a final opilio tally of $1.6 million. On the Wizard, they are back in the crab as well, ending up with crab oozing back on the deck. Captain Keith gives Lynn Guitard the final hook throw, rewarding him for cleaning up his act. He ends up shanking a long throw, but nails a retry without needing to turn around. The crew finishes with earnings of $1.8 million on a record haul. Back on the Northwestern on its final steam to Dutch Harbor, Edgar notifies Sig that he needs a break so he can take care of his family. He makes it clear he's putting his wife and children ahead of the boat from now on. Sig still doesn't believe Edgar will give the boat up. As for Jake Anderson, he'll fly ahead to finally address his missing father. On the Time Bandit, Captain Andy tells Mike Fourtner to be mindful of his ego next season as he is given more time in the captain's chair. Jake Harris heads to an addiction clinic in Palm Springs, California. Ten weeks later, in April 2010, the Cornelia Marie, with Josh Harris heading a four-man deck and Captain Derrick in the wheelhouse, finally finishes its opilio season. Josh is determined to remain in the fishery for the foreseeable future. The last shots show Josh Harris in the wheelhouse.
