= Stålbas =

Ship

M/S Stålbas (also, Stalbas and Staalbas), formerly the Norwegian Coast Guard cutter Stålbas offshore patrol vessel (English: NoCGV Stålbas; Norwegian: KV Stålbas), is a multifunction cargo vessel. It was converted to be able to perform crab fishing in 2021, and featured on the Discovery Channel USA show Deadliest Catch on Discovery+ and Discovery Channel Canada in the 2022 TV show season; and Deadliest Catch: The Viking Returns on Discovery USA for the 2022 fall TV season.

== History ==
=== Fishing vessel Trålbas (1955–1976) ===
The ship was originally built as the fishing boat Trålbas in 1955 at Beliard, Crighton, Ostend, Norway.

=== Norwegian Coast Guard (1976–2000) ===
The NoCGV Stålbas (Norwegian: KV Stålbas, lit. 'Coast Guard Stalbas'; English: Norwegian Coast Guard Vessel Stalbas) was a Norwegian Coast Guard cutter, an offshore patrol vessel in the Royal Norwegian Navy, for 4 decades. It became a Coast Guard vessel in 1976 and renamed Stålbas.

=== Civilian career (2000–2006) ===
The Stålbas went out of Coast Guard service and into civilian service in 2000, operating off the coast of Africa.

=== Norwegian Coast Guard ===
The NoCGV Stålbas (callsign: LNXH; pennant: W 314) returned to Coast Guard service in 2006, replacing NoCGV Nord.

=== Cargo vessel Stålbas ===
The MS Stålbas was a cargo ship after the end of its Coast Guard career.

=== Fishing vessel Stålbas ===
In 2010, the Stålbas was acquired by Barens Offshore AS for use as a fishing vessel.

=== Crabbing vessel Stålbas ===
Snowcrab fisherman Bengt Are Korneliussen became managing owner in 2021 after an ownership shuffle following licensing problems at Barens Offshore that resulted in a revoked fishing licence, the licence problems were resolved with the ownership change. In Fall 2021, the Stålbas was converted by owner Bengt Korneliussen to be able to function as a crabber fishing vessel, crab fishing red king crab in the open ocean, unlike most Norwegian crabbers, which crab fish in the sheltered fjords. It would be one of the first attempts to fish such beyond the 6-mile limit in deep water in the Norwegian waters economic zone, fishing Bering Sea American-style, on the Barents Sea. That would be filmed for Deadliest Catch and have American-born captain of F/V Northwestern Sig Hansen serving as captain. The ship would return again for Deadliest Catch spin-off The Viking Returns for the 2022 North American fall TV season.

== Specifications ==
- Engine: Wartsila Vasa 12V22
  - Single screw
  - Engine power: 2,180 shp (1,630 kW)
- Overall length: 58.8 m (193 ft)
- Waterline length: 54 m (177 ft)
- Width: 9.4 m (31 ft)
- Draft: 5.3 m (17 ft)
- Displacement: 854 tonnes (941 tons)
- Capacity: 472 tonnes (520 tons)

=== Coast Guard configuration ===
- Main gun: Bofors 40 mm Automatic Gun L/70
- Crew:
  - 3 ship's officers
  - 10 crewpeople
  - 5 civil officers
- Oil spill skimmer and booms

== Registration ==
- IMO number: 5077682
- MMSI number: 257281000
- fisher licence: T-174-K
- GRT 854
- Callsign: LNXH
- Flag nation: Norway
- Homeport: Aalesund, Norway
- Owner: UNIS, Bengt Are Korneliussen
- Built: 1955
