= Jake Anderson =

American television personality and fishing captain

- Born: Jakob Venn Martin Anderson; September 16, 1980 (age 46); Anacortes, Washington, U.S.
- Occupations: TV personality, author, captain of F/V Cornelia Marie
- Children: 3

Jakob Anderson (born September 16, 1980) is an American fishing captain of the FV Cornelia Marie. He was previously the captain and co-owner of the FV Saga. Since 2007, Anderson has been featured in the Discovery Channel documentary television series Deadliest Catch.

== Career ==
In 2007 Anderson was hired as a greenhorn by Captain Sig Hansen aboard the Northwestern. Anderson made his Deadliest Catch debut in the episode New Beginnings, which aired on May 15. In 2012, Anderson was promoted to deck boss of the Northwestern, and later that year, he obtained his USCG Mate 1600-ton license and Master 100-ton Captain's license. Starting in 2015, Anderson captained the crab fishing vessel Saga. In 2023 the Saga was put up for sale. A year later, Anderson became captain of the crab fishing vessel Titan Explorer. Although only initially hired, Anderson became minority-owner of the Titan Explorer following his first season captaining the vessel.

Anderson has endured personal tragedies while on Deadliest Catch, including being notified that his sister, Chelsea Dawn Anderson, had unexpectedly died during the season five episode fourteen "Bitter Tears". During season six, episode eleven "Blown Off Course" he learned that his father, Keith Anderson, had gone missing and was presumed dead after his truck was found abandoned in rural Washington. In 2012, the skeletal remains of Anderson's father were found by a hiker about a mile away from where his truck had been found.

== Personal life ==
Anderson lives in Seattle, Washington. He and his wife, Jenna, filed for divorce prior to the start of Season 22 of the show. They have 3 children together.

Anderson is an avid skateboarder and is sponsored by the American footwear and clothing company DVS Shoes. He also has a signature skateboard shoe released through the company.

During an interview with Dr. Drew Pinsky, Anderson revealed that he is a recovering alcoholic and his addiction left him homeless for two years.

His autobiography titled Relapse was released April 29, 2014 through Coventry House Publishing and became a bestseller.
