= Alex Staniforth =

English adventurer (born 1995)

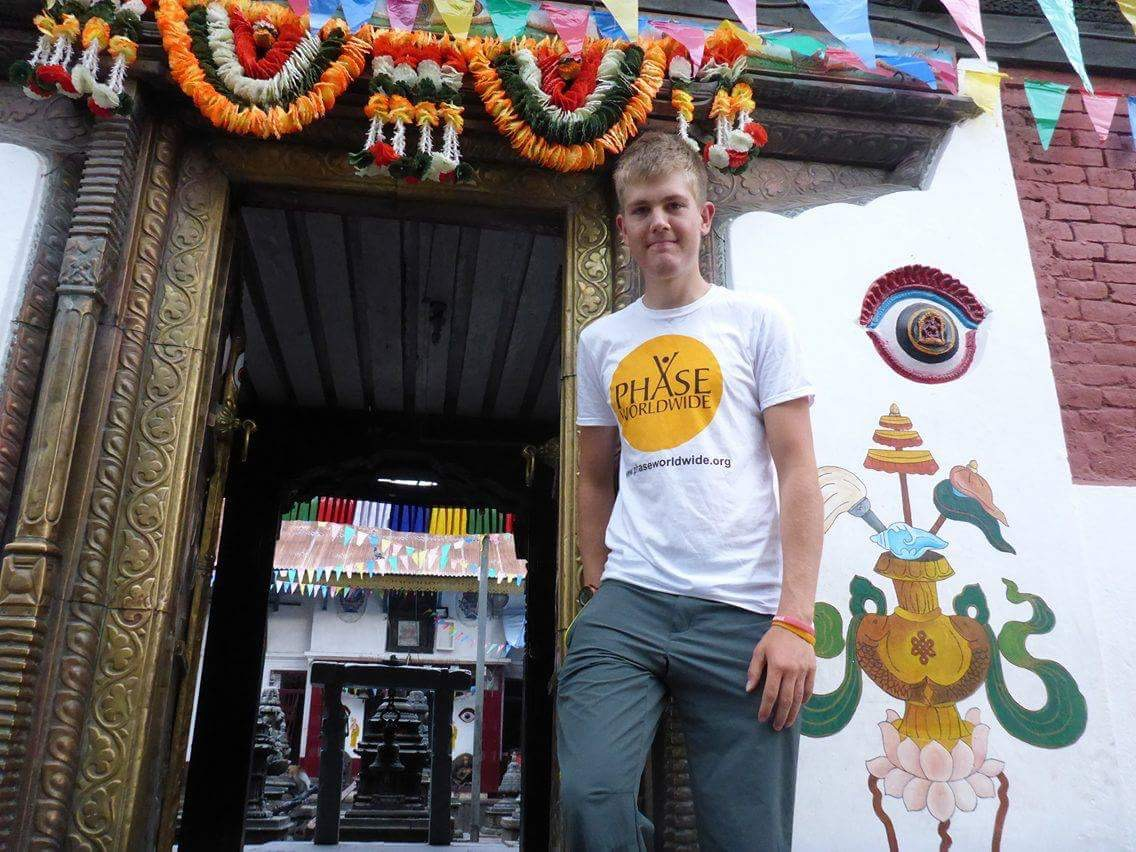
Alex in Kathmandu in 2016

Alex Staniforth (born 1995) is an English adventurer, endurance athlete, author, and charity ambassador. He made two attempts to climb Mount Everest and completed a series of long-distance mountain challenges in the United Kingdom. His debut book 'Icefall' was published in March 2016 and is an autobiographical account of his attempts to climb Everest. In July 2017, Staniforth became the fastest person to climb all 100 UK county tops in 72 days.

== Early life ==
Staniforth was born in Chester, Cheshire in 1995. He grew up in Kelsall and attended Tarporley High School and Sixth Form College.

=== Everest ===
Staniforth first attempted to climb Mount Everest aged 18. After reaching Everest Base Camp from Lukla, he and his team were preparing for their climb when an avalanche in the Khumbu Icefall killed 16 climbing Sherpas. The decision was taken to abandon the expedition.

Staniforth returned to Everest in 2015. On 25 April 2015, the Nepal earthquake struck. The earthquake measured 7.8 on the Richter scale and precipitated several avalanches on Everest, one of which hit base camp and killed 3 Sherpas in Staniforth's team. He and his team was just below Camp 1 (6,050m) and became stranded on the mountain for two days before evacuation by helicopter.

=== Cho Oyu ===
In Autumn 2016, Staniforth attempted to climb the world's sixth highest mountain Cho Oyu which stands at over 8,000 meters, in preparation for another attempt on Everest in the near future. He reached Camp 2 (7,125 meters) before abandoning his summit bid.

== Book ==
Staniforth's autobiography, 'Icefall', was published in March 2016 by Coventry House Publishing. It tells how he has overcome adversity since his childhood in Cheshire and his two Everest attempts. Adventurers Bear Grylls and Mark Wood both endorsed the book. 'Icefall' won a bronze medal in the Readers Favorite International Book Contest 2016.

In summer 2016, Staniforth toured the UK signing books and talking about his experiences.

== Charity work ==
Staniforth is a charity fundraiser and ambassador for YHA England and Wales and PHASE Worldwide.

In August 2016, Staniforth became an ambassador for PHASE Worldwide. He has worked with PHASE since he helped to organise the 'Walk for Nepal' event on the anniversary of the earthquake in April 2016. Over 120 people, including Staniforth, climbed Mount Snowdon in Wales and raised over £20,000 for PHASE.

=== Awards ===
After fundraising over £24,000 for mental health charity Young Minds UK, Staniforth won the Pride of Britain 'Fundraiser of the Year' award for the ITV Granada Reports region.

== Speaking ==
Staniforth tours the UK as a speaker to a variety of audiences including schools, corporate audiences, charities and conferences
