= Coventry House Publishing =

American publishing company

- Status: Active
- Founded: 2012
- Country of origin: United States
- Headquarters location: Dublin, Ohio
- Distribution: Ingram Content Group
- Publication types: Books
- Nonfiction topics: Business, economics, education, pop culture, social science, sports
- Official website: coventrybooks.com

Coventry House Publishing, LLC is an American non-fiction book imprint located in Dublin, Ohio.

== Notable authors ==
- Jake Anderson, TV personality on Deadliest Catch
- Josh Flagg, TV personality on Million Dollar Listing Los Angeles
- Madison Hildebrand, TV personality on Million Dollar Listing Los Angeles
- Kristin Tate, political commentator on Fox News Channel
- Burke Badenhop, baseball player for Boston Red Sox
- Jon Leiberman, radio personality on The Howard Stern Show

== Awards ==
- Melanie Lockert, Finalist at 7th Annual Plutus Awards
- Stefanie O'Connell, Finalist at 6th Annual Plutus Awards
