= Williwaw =

Sudden blast of wind descending from a mountainous coast to the sea

In meteorology, a williwaw (archaic spelling williwau) is a sudden blast of wind descending from a mountainous coast to the sea. The word is of unknown origin, but was earliest used by British seamen in the 19th century. The usage appears for winds found in the Strait of Magellan, the Aleutian Islands, and the coastal fjords of the Alaskan Panhandle, where the terms outflow wind and squamish wind are also used for the same phenomenon. On Greenland the word piteraq is used.

The williwaw results from the descent of cold, dense air from coastal mountains in high latitudes. Thus the williwaw is considered a type of katabatic wind.

== In popular culture ==
- Gore Vidal's first novel, Williwaw (1946), based on a ship in the Aleutian Islands, features the williwaw.
- In the Deadliest Catch episode "Finish Line", the ship Aleutian Ballad crabbed within a williwaw, when a rogue wave damaged the ship and knocked her on her side.
- The novel Williwaw! by Tom Bodett is about two children who almost die in a williwaw.
- W. Douglas Burden mentions a williwaw in his Look to the Wilderness.
- Alan Dean Foster mentions a williwaw in his book Mad Amos
- Television show Sergeant Preston of the Yukon, original air date December 12, 1956, “The Williwaw” - Sergeant Preston's sled gets destroyed in a terrible blizzard near a fishing lake so he seeks refuge in a nearby cabin not knowing the man inside is a killer.
- Episode of The Scooby-Doo Show entitled "Watch Out! The Willawaw!"
- Glasgow based sound artist Williwaw performs a regular set at The Old Hairdressers bar in Glasgow.
- Sir Ernest Shackleton uses the term in "South", his account of the Trans-Antarctic traverse attempt in the Discovery, from 1914-17.
- A williwaw was partially responsible for the capsizing of the crab fishing vessel FV Scandies Rose.

== See also ==
- Squamish (wind)
