= Suelo =

American simple living adherent (born 1961)

Daniel James Shellabarger (known as Daniel Suelo, or simply Suelo, and The Man Who Quit Money, born 1961) is an American simple living adherent who stopped using money in the autumn of 2000. He was born in Arvada, Colorado, a suburb of Denver, and once lived for many years in a cave near Moab, Utah, when not wandering the country.

Suelo gained fame in October 2009 when his profile appeared in the US men's style print magazine Details. This story was picked up by websites such as The Guardian in the UK, The Huffington Post, and Matador Change. He was also interviewed for the BBC in September 2009, by The Denver Post in November 2009, and the Brazilian INFO in November 2009. His story has since been repeated by many websites and news agencies around the world. Suelo was the subject of a 2006 video profile entitled Moneyless in Moab (2006), by Gordon Stevenson and a 2009 video profile entitled Zero Currency (2009), by Brad Barber as well as being featured on KBYU's Beehive Stories (2010), also by Brad Barber.

Penguin approached Suelo about writing an autobiography, but he said that he would not accept payment for telling his story and he would be interested to do so only if the book was given away for free. Penguin was not interested in this approach, but asked a friend of his, Mark Sundeen, about writing a biography. Sundeen wrote The Man Who Quit Money, which was published by Riverhead/Penguin in 2012, and Suelo did not accept any money from his book but requested that the publishers give away a number of copies to people for free, which they did at promotional book tours. A short film about Suelo, narrated by Mark Sundeen, is on BBC News Online.

In 2016 Suelo moved back to his hometown to care for his aging parents, and used money in this capacity. His mother died in 2026.

Suelo is one of a number of individuals who voluntarily live without money. These include Mark Boyle, Tomi Astikainen, the late Heidemarie Schwermer (1942–2016) and Jo Nemeth. Suelo appeared as a guest writer on Mark Boyle's blog in January 2011.

== See also ==
- Gift economy
