= FV Scandies Rose =

Crab fishing vessel

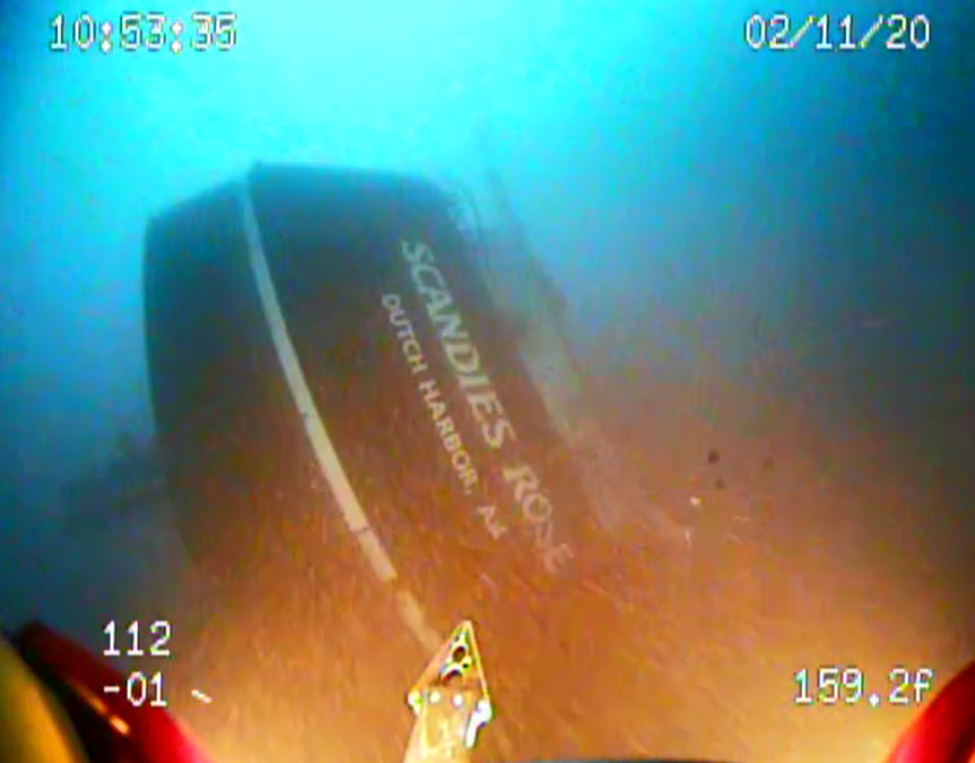
- The vessel lying on the seafloor on her starboard side

History
- Name: Scandies Rose
- Owner: Scandies Rose Ventures, LLC; Middle Grounds Fisheries, LLC
- Operator: Scandies Rose Fishing Company, LLC
- Port of registry: US: Dutch Harbor, Alaska
- Builder: Bender Shipbuilding, Mobile, Alabama
- Maiden voyage: 1978
- In service: 1978
- Out of service: 2020
- Identification: WDC7308
- Nickname(s): "The Battleship"; "The Tank"
- Fate: Sank on 31 December 2019, following a capsizing due to a combination of asymmetrical ice buildup and katabatic winds

General characteristics
- Type: Crab fishing vessel
- Length: 116.6 ft (35.5 m); 130 ft (40 m) l.o.a.
- Beam: 34 ft (10.4 m)
- Draught: 11 ft (3.4 m)
- Installed power: Two Detroit Diesel 12V2000-R1227K22 producing 1,610 hp (1,200 kW) (2 x 805 hp, 600 kW)
- Propulsion: Propeller
- Crew: 4–6

FV Scandies Rose (Fishing Vessel Scandies Rose) was a crab fishing vessel built in 1978 by Bender Shipbuilding out of Mobile, Alabama. Originally named Enterprise, she was registered in Dutch Harbor, Alaska. She mainly fished for king crabs, opilio crabs, and Pacific cod, in both the Bering Sea and the Gulf of Alaska. The sinking of the vessel became more widely known due to being featured in season 16 of the reality TV-show Deadliest Catch.

== Background ==
Scandies Rose was a crab fishing vessel built in 1978 by Bender Shipbuilding in Mobile, Alabama. The vessel was constructed specifically for use with pots. The boat was considered a work of "extraordinary craftsmanship" in a 2019 inspection, with construction materials and design rivaling the finest fishing vessels from the west coast. In the summer, she fished for Pacific cod in both the Bering Sea and the Gulf of Alaska, with crab fishing occurring during the winter months of the year. It was bought in 2008 by the Scandies Rose Fishing Company, out of Bremerton, Washington. Following this, the vessel was rechristened as the Scandies Rose. The vessel took part in the United States Coast Guard's safety evaluation program in 2018, as it was mandatory biannually. During this process, no faults or comments were noted. Fishing vessels are also more isolated than before, as efforts to relieve strained fishing grounds have led to fewer ships out at sea at any one time.

The captain of the vessel, Gary Cobban Jr., was according to crew members formerly employed on the vessel a "good captain" and "surprisingly safety conscious". Safety drills on the Scandies Rose were considered more thorough than on other vessels they had worked on. The vessel also had a strict alcohol and substance policy, forbidding the use of it on board. A crew member who previously worked on the Scandies Rose described it as a "tank", a nickname the vessel also went by, due to its ability to manage tough weather conditions. Another crew member described the vessel as a "large boat" that could "push through" tough weather conditions that other vessels couldn't manage. An investigation report by the National Transportation Safety Board determined that the abilities of the captain was not a reason for the capsizing, but a report from the Coast Guard described the accident as "preventable".

== Sequence of events ==
=== Preparation ===
On 29 December 2019, the captain and crew of Scandies Rose began initial preparations of the ship for departure from "Cannery Row", a harbor in Kodiak, Alaska. With the intent to participate in cod fishing in the Bering Sea, which was first permitted from the first of January, the crew worked through the night with loading and securing the 195 pots. The pots measured 7 feet (2.1 m) by 8 feet (2.4 m) by 34 inches (860 mm). Among the crew was the captain's son, David Cobban. On 30 December, the crew continued preparing the vessel and made sure everything was secured. The vessel was then moved to a fueling dock where she was loaded with diesel fuel and potable water. Captain Cobban Jr. conducted safety drills on the vessel, which included both discussion about the engine room fire suppression system, locations of life rafts, and the vessel's Emergency Beacon. Crew members were instructed on how to signal mayday using the radio equipment on board. In interviews conducted afterwards, the two surviving crewmembers both stated that the drills were thorough. The safety drills were documented, signed by everyone on board, and sent via text message to the vessel manager. The crew and captain discussed the weather along the proposed route. According to one of the survivors, the crew used a weather app called Windy for weather updates. The National Weather Service's (NWS) marine forecasts were continuously received via Very high frequency. Just before Scandies Rose departed, the NWS issued a marine forecast that included a gale warning and a heavy freezing spray warning for the vessel's proposed route. According to both survivors, the crew and captain knew the weather was going to be "lousy".

=== Journey ===
At 20:35 on 30 December, Scandies Rose departed from the fueling dock, with the captain at the helm. She traveled northeast through the harbor channel, under the Near Island Bridge. About an hour later she turned to the northwest, navigating through a strait between Spruce Island and Kodiak. At this point she averaged about 9–10 knots SOG. Whenever the vessel wasn't fishing, the captain and crew used a fixed time schedule, letting the captain steer the vessel for six hours before letting each crew member steer the boat for an hour each. Every twelfth hour, the schedule restarted. At 02:00 on 31 December, she left the Kupreanof strait, continuing into the Shelikof Strait. She turned left and established a southwestern course along the coast of Kodiak Island. The determined route continued along the Aleut peninsula, before passing along the village False Pass, and into the Bering Sea.

Between 02:00 and 08:00, the crew followed the time schedule as usual. Both of the survivors explained that despite initially being tired from working hard with preparing the boat the days before, once the vessel was out at sea they were able to sleep and felt rested. Every time that a crew member had finished and transferred their allotted shift, they each went down to the engine room to ensure that the motor and auxiliary equipment were in good working order. According to one of the survivors, the weather had gotten worse the night before, with strong winds and waves washing over the starboard bow of the vessel. He noted that ice was "building" on the pots in the front of the vessel. The other survivor noted that the ice was over 1 inch (2.5 cm) inside the pots, with over 2 inches (5 cm) of ice on the railings. Since Scandies Rose didn't experience any list at this time, ice removal was not deemed necessary for the time being.

==== Contact with FV Amatuli ====
At 08:00 on 31 December, the captain started his shift at the helm, and continued in a southwestern route of 240 degrees, with a speed of 8 knots. At 11:18 the vessel was around 14.7 nautical miles or 17 miles (27.4 km) west of Cape Ikolik of Kodiak Island. The captain contacted the vessel FV Amatuli. The captain of the Amatuli was a majority shareholder in the Scandies Rose, and the two were acquaintances. They talked for about 12 minutes. Amatuli was headed for Dutch Harbor, to then return to the Bering Sea to continue fishing. Amatuli was at this point around 13.9 nautical miles or 16 miles (25.7 km) east of the Unimak Pass. The captain aboard Amatuli told captain Cobban Jr. that his vessel had pulled into Unimak Bight to seek shelter and allow the crew to rest because the weather was so "foul". When captain Cobban Jr. asked about suitable locations to drop anchor and take shelter from the weather, the captain responded that "there are literally hundreds of places". Before the call was ended captain Cobban Jr. said that it was "very cold", that his vessel was experiencing light icing, and that the sea conditions were poor.

At approximately 22:00 Alaska Standard Time, the United States Coast Guard received a distress call from Scandies Rose. At this point the vessel was around 2.5 miles (4.0 km) from Sutwik Island. Only minutes later, the vessel sank. Only two out of the seven crew members survived and were found by the coast guard. According to the two survivors, Scandies Rose began accumulating ice on her starboard side between roughly 02:00 and 08:00. By 20:37 the boat had accumulated so much ice that it was traveling with a 20-degree list. In an attempt to find shelter from the hostile weather, the captain changed course, but the list worsened. The route that Scandies Rose was following, close to the Aleutian Islands, is notorious for local katabatic winds caused by the unique geography, called williwaws. As the williwaws blew against the starboard side of the vessel, the winds were in actuality stabilizing the vessel. When the course was altered to find shelter, the ship instead faced winds from the port side, worsening the list. This, in combination with the asymmetrical ice buildup resulted in instability to such an extent that the vessel capsized.
