= Squamish (wind) =

Strong and violent wind occurring in fjords

A squamish (also known as an Arctic outflow wind in winter months) is a strong and often violent wind occurring in many of the fjords, inlets and valleys of British Columbia. Squamishes occur in those fjords oriented in a northeast–southwest or east–west direction where cold polar air can be funneled westward, the opposite of how the wind generally flows on the Coast. These winds in winter can create high windchills by coastal standards of −20 to −30 °C (−4 to −22 °F). They are notable in Jervis, Toba, and Bute Inlets and in Dean Channel and the Portland Canal. Squamishes lose their strength when free of the confining fjords and are not noticeable more than 25 km offshore.

In Northern Washington including Lynden and Bellingham, and Lower Mainland, including Eastern Vancouver Island, of British Columbia, they are mainly referred to as outflow winds. They are noticeable especially in the winter, when a cold Arctic air mass holding in the high plateau country of the interior flows down to the sea through the canyons and lower passes piercing the Coast Mountains and crossing the Strait of Georgia. The winds are named after the Squamish People (Skwxwú7mesh) of Squamish, British Columbia.Their historical territory of upper Howe Sound, just off the Squamish River estuary, is known widely in the windsurfing and kiteboarding worlds for its excellent, steady winds.

During the Christmas season of 1996, a major blizzard which brought record snowfalls to the Lower Mainland and Eastern Vancouver Island was followed up by hurricane-force winds pouring west through the towns of the Fraser Valley, as the coastal system's strength (that had brought the snow) was forced back by the breaking of the interior's cold air mass. Intense outflow winds are relatively common year-round (during stormy weather, and sometimes fair) in the Upper Fraser Valley, particularly on Sumas Prairie between Abbotsford and Chilliwack, and further upriver towards the mouth of the Fraser Canyon. Known by different names in each region up the Coast, outflow winds or squamishes are also substantial maritime threats off the openings of the major fjords and up their narrow, deep lengths. Queen Charlotte Strait in particular is known for heavy winds coming out of the mouth of Knight Inlet, at the upper east end of the strait.

== See also ==
- Williwaw
- Chinook wind
