= Phil Harris (fisherman) =

American nautical captain

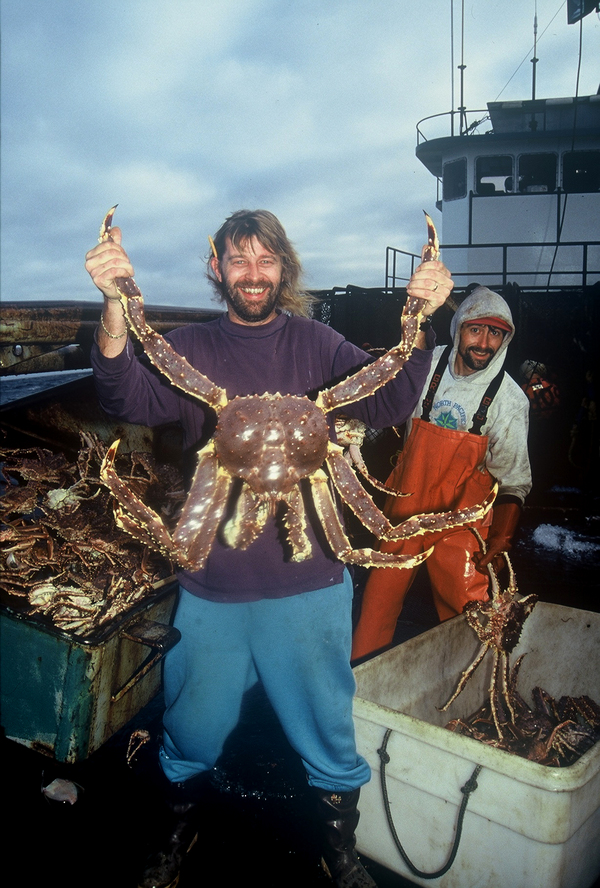
- Harris and long time crewman Murray Gamrath in the early 1990s.
- Born: Phillip Charles Harris; December 19, 1956; Bothell, Washington, U.S.
- Died: February 9, 2010 (aged 53); Anchorage, Alaska, U.S.
- Other names: Skipper, Captain
- Occupations: Captain of the F/V Cornelia Marie, Co-creator of Captain's Reserve Coffee, author
- Spouse(s): Mary Harris (m. 1982; div. 1991); Teresa Harris (m. 1992; div. 2006)
- Children: 2

Phillip Charles Harris (December 19, 1956 – February 9, 2010) was an American captain and part owner of the crab fishing vessel F/V Cornelia Marie, which has been featured on Discovery Channel's documentary reality TV series Deadliest Catch. He suffered a stroke while offloading C. opilio crab in port at Saint Paul Island, Alaska, on January 29, 2010. Despite improvements in his condition, Harris died on February 9, 2010, at the age of 53, while suffering an intracranial hemorrhage in the hospital.

The episode of Deadliest Catch featuring the Captain's death aired on July 20, 2010, followed by a special tribute episode.

== Career ==
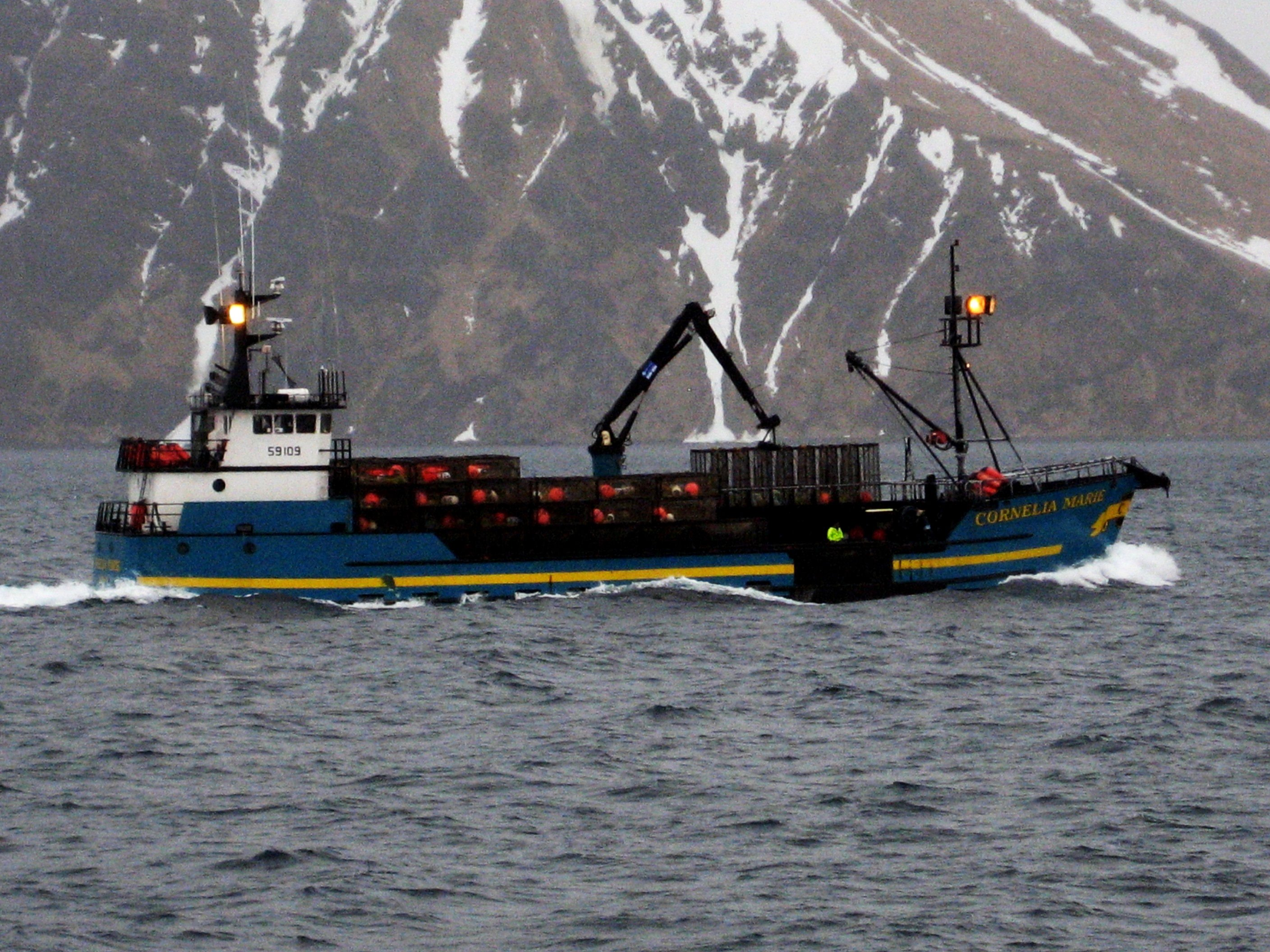
The F/V Cornelia Marie

Harris started fishing with his father at age eight and after high school began crab fishing. He initially worked on a crab boat as an unpaid deckhand until he proved his worth. By the time he was 21 he was one of the youngest crab fishing boat captains on the Bering Sea. He had been captain of the F/V Cornelia Marie for more than 20 years at the time of his death.

From 2004 and until his death, Harris and his boat were followed by an embedded film crew for the series Deadliest Catch. The F/V Cornelia Marie was first shown during the opilio crab portion of Season 1, as partner boat of the F/V Maverick. The F/V Cornelia Marie was heavily involved in search efforts for the F/V Big Valley after it sank. It became a regular fixture of the show from the second season on.

Harris was thrown from his bunk during a storm in the 2008 season, and thought he had broken his ribs. He spent several hours coughing up blood until his sons and crew finally convinced him to seek medical attention and enlisted the film crew to watch his condition. Doctors later determined that he had suffered a pulmonary embolism. Medical treatment for this condition prevented him from fishing for almost a year. He returned for the opilio crab fishing season in January 2009.

Some of Harris' sea stories were included in the book Deadliest Catch: Desperate Hours. In 2008, Harris developed a line of coffees, "Captain's Reserve", with blends named after fishing themes such as "Harris Family Blend" and "Midnight Sunrise".

Harris's chain–smoking, which was frequently seen on the show, added to his health woes.

== Death ==
Harris suffered a stroke during the sixth season of Deadliest Catch. He was offloading opilio crab on January 29, 2010, at Saint Paul Island, Alaska. He was flown to Anchorage for surgery, and was placed in an induced coma to reduce intracranial pressure and swelling. He awoke from the coma after his condition improved. He was squeezing hands, talking, and showing other signs of improvement. Harris' doctors were amazed by his rapid improvement, saying that he was making gains in a few days that usually take months for stroke victims. However, Harris died from an intracranial hemorrhage on February 9, 2010.

He was cremated, and half of his ashes were buried in an ornately painted Harley Davidson motorcycle gas tank with the remains of his mother; his family spread the remainder of the ashes at sea from aboard the F/V Cornelia Marie.

His sons Josh and Jake Harris issued a statement from the Harris family, saying, "It is with great sadness that we say goodbye to our dad" – Captain Phil Harris. Dad has always been a fighter and continued to be until the end. For us and the crew, he was someone who never backed down. We will remember and celebrate that strength. Thanks to everyone for their thoughts and prayers." Josh would eventually become the F/V Cornelia Marie's new captain.

The sixth season of Deadliest Catch featured footage of Harris at work for the last time. A memorial service to Harris was hosted by the Discovery Channel along Seattle's waterfront on Smith Cove Cruise Terminal at Pier 91 on Friday evening, April 30, 2010. This was the night before the Puget Sound's annual Opening Day for boating season. His sons spoke at this service. A boat gave a final salute from the location where his vessel is based in Elliott Bay.

== Personal life ==
Harris was single at the time of his death, but had been married and divorced twice. His first marriage, from 1982 to 1991 was to Mary Harris, mother of his two sons, Josh and Jake. Josh and Jake worked on board his fishing vessel during the taping of Discovery's Deadliest Catch on the F/V Cornelia Marie, as deckhands. His second marriage, to Teresa Harris, began January 22, 1992, and ended in divorce in 2006. His hometown was Bothell, Washington. He enjoyed driving fast and owned both a Harley-Davidson motorcycle and a Chevrolet Corvette. Besides driving fast and fishing, he also enjoyed building bird feeders.
