= Kristin Tate =

American columnist and political commentator

- Born: New Hampshire, U.S.
- Website: kristinbtate.com

Kristin Tate is an American libertarian columnist, political commentator and author based in Boston.

== Career ==
Tate grew up in New Hampshire and received her Bachelor of Arts degree at Emerson College in Boston.

She writes a weekly opinion column for The Hill. Her op-eds have additionally appeared in outlets such as National Review, Washington Examiner, and The Washington Times. Her first book, Government Gone Wild: How D.C. Politicians Are Taking You for a Ride – and What You Can Do About It, was released by Hachette Book Group in April 2016. Her second book, How Do I Tax Thee?: A Field Guide to the Great American Rip-Off, was published by St. Martin's Press in 2018.

She appears frequently as a commentator on the Fox News Channel, Fox Business Network, MSNBC, and CNN. In 2016, Red Alert Politics named Tate to their list of the 30 most influential right-of-center leaders under the age of 30.

Tate is an analyst for the student libertarian group Young Americans for Liberty. Tate hosts a podcast presented by Young Americans for Liberty titled "You Built that". The podcast focuses on entrepreneurship, free enterprise, and free-market politics. Guests have included My Pillow, INC CEO Mike Lindell, Atlas Society CEO Jennifer Grossman, and Dallas salon owner Shelley Luther.
