= Malcolm MacPherson (writer) =

American journalist

- Born: Malcolm Cook MacPherson; August 23, 1943; Bridgeport, Connecticut, U.S.
- Died: January 17, 2009 (aged 65)
- Education: Trinity College
- Occupations: Journalist; author
- Spouse: Joanne (m. 1988)
- Children: 2
- Writing career
- Genres: Fiction; non-fiction

Malcolm Cook MacPherson (August 23, 1943 – January 17, 2009) was an American national and foreign correspondent for Newsweek magazine and the author of numerous fiction and nonfiction books.

== Biography ==
MacPherson was born in Bridgeport, Connecticut on August 23, 1943, and spent his early childhood in Garden Grove in Orange County, California near Disneyland. After surviving a car crash that killed his parents when he was 11 years old in 1954–1955, he headed back East and lived with relatives in Wallingford, Connecticut. Attending a high school program during the summer in New Delhi, he had the opportunity to interview Prime Minister of India Jawaharlal Nehru, helping trigger an interest in journalism. He attended Trinity College in nearby Hartford, Connecticut, graduating in 1965.

MacPherson spent six years in the Marine Corps Reserves, starting in 1965. Working at Time magazine as a trainee, he was fired after throwing a drink in an editor's face while attending a holiday party. He started working for Newsweek magazine in 1968, first as a national correspondent, providing coverage from cities in the United States including Boston, Chicago and Los Angeles. Five years later, he started taking on overseas assignments, including covering the Yom Kippur War in 1973, the 1974 Turkish invasion of Cyprus and "The Rumble in the Jungle" in Kinshasa, Zaire in October 1974, with world Heavyweight boxing champion George Foreman facing former world champion Muhammad Ali, reporting from postings in London, Nairobi and Paris.

Turning down a position at its San Francisco office, MacPherson left Newsweek magazine. Moving into a treehouse in Kenya, he wrote his first novel, Protégé, about a group of former Nazis who try to take over Tanzania, which was published in 1980. The Lucifer Key, published the following year, told the story of a hacker who brings the United States and Soviet Union to the edge of nuclear war after he breaks into the Pentagon computer system. His 1984 non-fiction book The Blood of His Servants told of the search by Israeli journalist Lieber "Bibi" Krumholz for the man who killed his family during World War II. Time Bomb, published in 1986, was about the race to develop the atomic bomb. His 1994 comic novel In Cahoots was about real estate speculation in California. A story about a real-life rancher from Colorado who adopts a baby elephant was the impetus for his 2001 book The Cowboy and His Elephant. Roberts Ridge, about Navy Seals operating in Afghanistan, was published in 2005. His 2007 book Hocus POTUS was a satiric novel about the search for weapons of mass destruction, based on his reporting in a freelance assignment for Time magazine in Iraq after the 2003 invasion of Iraq.

MacPherson, a resident of Warrenton, Virginia, died of a heart attack at age 65 on January 17, 2009, after collapsing while attending a pre-inauguration party for then-President-elect Barack Obama in Chevy Chase, Maryland. He was survived by his wife, whom he married in 1988, two children and two sisters.

== Books ==
- MacPherson, Malcolm (2006). Roberts Ridge: A Story of Courage and Sacrifice on Takur Ghar Mountain, Afghanistan. New York: Bantam Dell. ISBN 0-553-58680-7.
