= Deadliest Catch =

American reality television series

- Created by: Thom Beers
- Narrated by: Mike Rowe
- Country of origin: United States
- Original language: English
- No. of seasons: 23
- No. of episodes: 385 (list of episodes)

Production
- Executive producers: Ernie Avila; Thom Beers; Jeff Hasler; Brian Lovett; Arom Starr-Paul
- Editors: Nathan Araiza; Josh Earl
- Running time: 60 minutes
- Production company: Original Productions

Original release
- Network: Discovery Channel
- Release: April 12, 2005 – present

Deadliest Catch is an American reality television series that premiered on the Discovery Channel on April 12, 2005. The show follows crab fishermen aboard fishing vessels in the Bering Sea during the Alaskan king crab and snow crab fishing seasons. The base of operations for the fishing fleet is the Aleutian Islands port of Dutch Harbor, Alaska. Produced for the Discovery Channel, the show's title is derived from the inherent high risk of injury or death associated with this line of work. Season 22 began airing on May 8, 2026 and concluded on September 27, 2026. Season 23 is currently in production.

== Overview ==
The series follows a fisherman's life on the Bering Sea aboard various crab fishing boats during two of the crab fishing seasons, the October king crab season and the January opilio crab season. The show emphasizes the dangers on deck to the fishermen and camera crews as they duck heavy crab pots swinging into position, maneuver hundreds of pounds of crab across a deck strewn with hazards, and lean over the rails to position pots for launch or retrieval, while gale-force winds and high waves lash the deck constantly.

Each episode focuses on a story, situation, or theme that occurs on one or more boats. In contrast, side stories delve into the backgrounds and activities of one or two crew members, particularly the "greenhorns" (rookie crew members) on several boats. The fleet's captains are featured prominently, highlighting their camaraderie with their fellow captains and relationships with their crews, as well as their competition with other boats in the hunt for crab. Common themes include friendly rivalries among the captains (particularly between Sig Hansen of the F/V Northwestern and Johnathan and Andy Hillstrand of the F/V Time Bandit), the familial ties throughout the fleet (brothers Sig, Norm, and Edgar Hansen, who own the Northwestern; the Hillstrand brothers and Johnathan's son Scotty on the F/V Time Bandit; brothers Keith and Monte Colburn of the Wizard), the stresses of life on the Bering Sea, and the high burnout rate among greenhorns.

Because Alaskan crab fishing is one of the most dangerous jobs in the world, the U.S. Coast Guard rescue helicopters stationed at Integrated Support Command Kodiak (Kodiak, Alaska) and their outpost on St. Paul Island, near the northern end of the crab fishing grounds, are frequently shown rescuing crab boat crew members who fall victim to the harsh conditions on the Bering Sea. The U.S. Coast Guard rescue squad was featured prominently during the episodes surrounding the loss of F/V Big Valley in January 2005, the loss of F/V Ocean Challenger in October 2006, and the loss of F/V Katmai in October 2008. Original Productions keeps a camera crew stationed with the Coast Guard during the filming of the show in preparation for such occurrences.

=== Narration ===
The show has no on-camera host. A narrator provides commentary connecting the storylines as the show shifts from one boat to another. Discovery Channel voice artist Mike Rowe narrates the action for North American airings. In the United Kingdom, voice artist Bill Petrie serves as narrator. The show transitions between boats using a mock-up radar screen that shows the positions of the ships relative to one another and the two ends of the fishing grounds, St. Paul Island to the north and Dutch Harbor to the south.

Rowe was originally supposed to be the on-camera host, and he appeared in taped footage as himself during the first season of shooting. As filming of the first season was nearing completion, Discovery greenlit production on another Rowe project, Dirty Jobs, under the condition that Rowe chose only one show on which to appear on camera. Most of the footage Rowe shot during the first season became part of the first season's "Behind the Scenes" episode. After the third season of Deadliest Catch, Rowe began hosting a post-season behind-the-scenes miniseries entitled After the Catch, which is a roundtable discussion featuring the captains relating their experiences filming the previous season's episodes.

=== Changes required for parental guidance ratings ===
Because Deadliest Catch is essentially a filmed record of everyday life in a stressful working environment, the producers have to censor gestures and language deemed inappropriate for television audiences. For example, under the U.S. Television rating system, Deadliest Catch is rated TV-14 with inappropriate language ("L") as a highlighted concern. For visual disguise of such items as finger gestures, bloody injuries, or non-featured crew member anonymity, the producers use the traditional pixelization or blurring. However, due to the volume of profanities used in the course of crew member conversation, the producers occasionally employ alternative methods of censoring profanities, such as using sound effects in place of the traditional "bleep".

=== Theme song ===
Following the first season, original broadcast episodes of the show used the Bon Jovi song "Wanted Dead or Alive" as the main theme. Through the course of the show, the theme was eventually truncated and, following season 11, its use was replaced entirely.

== Subject matter ==
=== Dangers of commercial fishing ===
Commercial fishing has long been considered one of the most dangerous jobs in America. In 2006, the Bureau of Labor Statistics ranked commercial fishing as the job occupation with the highest fatality rate, with 141.7 deaths per 100,000 person-years worked, almost 75% higher than the fatality rate for pilots, flight engineers, and loggers, the next most hazardous occupations. However, Alaskan king crab fishing is considered even more dangerous than the average commercial fishing job, due to the conditions on the Bering Sea during the seasons when they fish for crab. According to the pilot episode, the death rate during the main crab seasons averages out to nearly one fisherman per week, while the injury rate for crews on most crab boats is nearly 100% due to the severe weather conditions (frigid gales, rogue waves, ice formations on and around the boat) and the danger of working with such heavy machinery on a constantly rolling boat deck. Alaskan king crab fishing reported over 300 fatalities per 100,000 person-years as of 2005, with over 80% of those deaths caused by drowning or hypothermia.

=== Rationalization: derby vs. quota ===
The series' first season was shot during the final year of the derby style king crab fishery. The subsequent seasons have been set after a change to the quota system as part of a process known as "rationalization". Under the old derby style, a large number of crews competed with each other to catch crab during a restrictive time window. Under the new Individual Fishing Quota (IFQ) system, established owners, such as those shown on the series, have been given quotas that they can fill at a more relaxed pace. In theory, it is intended to be safer, which was the main rationale for the change in the fishing rules. The transition to the quota system was also expected to increase the value of crab by limiting the market of available crab. An influx of foreign crab negated some of these gains during the 2006 season. The rationalization process put many crews out of work because the owners of many small boats found their assigned quotas too small to meet operating expenses. During the first season run under the IFQ system, the fleet shrank from over 250 boats to about 89 larger boats with high quotas.

=== Society of fishermen ===
One of the series' main features is the portrayal of the harsh life at sea, including the behavior and mannerisms of the fishermen who are engaged in a hazardous lifestyle with little tolerance for low performance or ineptitude. Several of the series' shows have featured "greenhorn" fishermen who are usually the brunt of harsh criticism and sometimes bullying by veteran deckhands. In one case, a new fisherman entered a ship's bridge to berate his captain for what he saw as unfair comments (the fisherman was fired as soon as the ship returned to port). Another filmed incident was a fight on board the fishing vessel Wizard in which a greenhorn sailor sucker punched a veteran fisherman who had been engaged in harassment and bullying. Again, the greenhorn was fired as soon as the ship hit port, leading to mixed reactions by fans of the show.

== Production ==
=== Technical ===
The Behind the Scenes special provided insight on how the program is produced. A two-person TV crew lives on each boat profiled. They use handheld Sony HVR-Z5U and HVR-Z7U HDV cameras to shoot most of the series (one on the main deck, one in the wheelhouse). Additional footage is provided by four stationary cameras that are permanently mounted around the ship and are constantly recording. Shots from vantage points outside the boat are accomplished through a variety of methods, including the use of a helicopter for footage near the harbor and a cameraman on a chase boat (in season 1, the main chase boat was the F/V Time Bandit). The crew also makes use of underwater cameras, including one attached to a crab pot for a "crab's eye view" of the pot being retrieved in season 2, one mounted in the main crab tank on the F/V Northwestern beginning in season 2, and one mounted to a submersible watercraft beginning in season 3. The Season 9 "Behind the Lens" special shows two more filming methods: divers near the boats (and on the bottom of Dutch Harbor for the king crab fleet departure), and a helicopter with a belly-mounted turret camera (same as that used to film scenes in Skyfall).

Audio is recorded using wireless microphones worn by the fishermen and shotgun microphones attached to the cameras. Because of a lack of space on the boats, the crews do not have an audio mixer on board. In audio post-production, the sound team attempts to use actual sounds that were recorded on the boats.

Although the equipment is carefully waterproofed, the cameras are routinely damaged by corrosion, ice and accidents.

Captain Sig Hansen of the F/V Northwestern serves as a technical advisor to the series' producers.

=== Filming ===
Shooting episodes of Deadliest Catch is a dangerous occupation for the camera crews on board the boats. In the early seasons, when many of the camera crews had little or no experience on crab boats, they frequently ran into dangers not normally encountered when shooting a documentary. F/V Northwestern captain Sig Hansen told talk show host Jimmy Kimmel that he saved a cameraman's life during the first season, screaming at him to get out of the way just seconds before a 900-pound crab pot swinging from a crane crossed the space where the cameraman was standing. In another incident, showcased on the behind the scenes special, an inattentive cameraman had his leg fall through an open hatch on the deck of one of the boats when he unwittingly stepped into the hole, suffering three broken ribs (and, according to the cameraman, having to buy a case of beer for the entire crew as per tradition on crab boats).

==== Personal and sensitive situations ====
Interactions between the film crew and the fishermen appear in the show occasionally. During an episode of season 4, Wizard captain Keith Colburn demanded that cameras be turned off when he got into a heated argument with his brother Monte. The cameras were turned off, but the Colburns neglected to remove their wireless mics, and the subsequent exchange was recorded and featured in the episode. Also, in season 4, F/V Cornelia Marie Captain Phil Harris asked the cameraman filming him not to tell anyone else about his injuries, for fear it would stall his fishing. Later on, crew member and later acting captain Murray Gamrath, concerned for Phil's well-being, asked a cameraman to keep an eye on him and to report any problem. During season 5, the camera crew on the Northwestern were requested not to film crew member Jake Anderson being informed of his sister's death, which the camera crew honored.

On September 28, 2010, it was reported that three of the principal captains featured throughout the series' run, the brothers Andy and Johnathan Hillstrand and Sig Hansen, would not return to the show due to litigation initiated by Discovery Communications involving the Hillstrands. On October 8, 2010, it was announced that the three captains had reached an agreement with Discovery and would return for the seventh season.

==== The death of Captain Phil Harris ====
On January 29, 2010, as Original Productions' crews shot footage for season 6 of the F/V Cornelia Marie offloading C. opilio crab at St. Paul Island, Captain Phil Harris, who had earlier complained of being excessively tired, went to his stateroom to retrieve pain medicines and collapsed after suffering a stroke. Second-year Engineer Steve Ward discovered him on the floor of his stateroom, conscious but unable to move his left leg or his left hand. Ward immediately got Phil's sons, Josh and Jake, to come to his stateroom while he called for paramedics. According to Thom Beers, producer and creator of Deadliest Catch, Harris insisted that the camera crews continue to film him. "We want to remember Phil as who he was," Beers told Zap2it.com writer Kate O'Hare. "We want to remember all the dynamics, but at the same time, the guy was persistent when we were doing this, saying, 'Dude, you've got to. We've got to have an end to the story [about the strength and resiliency of familial bonds, especially the father/son bond]. You want to film this, film this.'" Beers said he honored Harris' wishes and continued to shoot as Harris was airlifted to Anchorage, Alaska, where doctors performed emergency brain surgery to relieve the pressure building up in the cranial vault and avoid further brain damage. Harris spent 11 days in ICU before succumbing to complications from his stroke on February 9, 2010.

The Soul Rebels Brass Band performed a New Orleans style Jazz Funeral for the late Captain Phil Harris on After The Catch.

== Vessels ==
=== Current fishing vessels ===
Fishing Vessel	Captain(s)	Season(s)
F/V Aleutian Lady	Rick Shelford	19–20, 21, 22
F/V Aleutian Lady	Rick Shelford & Sophia "Bob" Nielsen	21
F/V Cornelia Marie	Phil Harris^{1}	2-3, 4, 5, 6
F/V Cornelia Marie	Murray Gamrath	4, 5
F/V Cornelia Marie	Derrick Ray	6, 7
F/V Cornelia Marie	Tony Lara^{2}	7
F/V Cornelia Marie	Josh Harris & Casey McManus	10, 11–16, 17, 18
F/V Cornelia Marie	Casey McManus	17
F/V Cornelia Marie	Jake Anderson	22–23
F/V Northwestern	Sig Hansen	Pilot, 1–8, 9, 10, 11–12, 13, 14, 18, 20–21, 22, 23
F/V Northwestern	Edgar Hansen^{1}	9, 10, 12, 13, 14
F/V Northwestern	Sig & Mandy Hansen	14, 15–17, 19
F/V Northwestern	Sig Hansen & Jake Anderson	20
F/V Northwestern	Mandy Hansen & Clark Pederson	21
F/V Northwestern	Clark Pederson	21
F/V Northwestern	Sig Hansen & Sophia "Bob" Nielsen	22
F/V Time Bandit	Johnathan & Andy Hillstrand^{2}	2–13, 19
F/V Time Bandit	Johnathan Hillstrand & Josh Harris	17
F/V Time Bandit	Johnathan Hillstrand	17, 18, 19, 20, 21, 22–23
F/V Time Bandit	Johnathan Hillstrand & Sig Hansen	21

^1Sig's brother Edgar occasionally took over as captain for blue king crab or bairdi seasons, and sporadically during the middle of an opilio season up until his removal from the show sometime after season 14.

^2Johnathan usually served as captain for king crab season while Andy took over as captain during opilio season.

^3Keith's brother Monte occasionally takes over as captain for bairdi and opilio seasons.

=== Former fishing vessels ===
Fishing Vessel	Captain(s)	Season(s)
F/V Aleutian Ballad	Jerry "Corky" Tilley	2-3
F/V Arctic Dawn	Ole Helgevold	Pilot
F/V Barbara J	Jack Bunnell & Steve "Harley" Davidson	19
F/V Billikin	Jeff Weeks	1
F/V Billikin	Steve "Harley" Davidson	18
F/V Brenna A	Sean Dwyer	12–15, 18
F/V Cape Caution	"Wild" Bill Wichrowski	9-12
F/V Confidence	Steve "Harley" Davidson & James Gamberton	21
F/V Confidence	Steve "Harley" Davidson & Greg Wallace	21
F/V Early Dawn	Allen Oakley	3
F/V Early Dawn	Rick Fehst	4
F/V Elinore J^{3}	Sean Dwyer	18
F/V Erla N	Bing Henkel	Pilot
F/V Farwest Leader	Greg Moncrief	3
F/V Fierce Allegiance	Tony LaRussa^{4}	1
F/V Incentive	Harry Lewis	5
F/V Kiska Sea	Mike Wilson	9
F/V Kodiak	"Wild" Bill Wichrowski	6-8
F/V Lady Alaska	Peter Liske	1
F/V Lady Alaska	Scott Campbell Jr.	16, 17
F/V Lisa Marie	Wade Henley	5
F/V Lucky Lady	Vince Shavender	1
F/V Maverick	Rick & Donna Quashnick	1, 2, 3
F/V Maverick	Blake Painter^{5}	3
F/V North American	Sten Skaar	4
F/V Pacific Mariner	Jack Bunnell & Steve "Harley" Davidson	20
F/V Patricia Lee	Rip Carlton	18
F/V Ramblin' Rose	Elliott Neese	7-8
F/V Retriever	Jim Stone	1
F/V Rollo	Eric Nyhammer	2
F/V Saga	Roger Strong	Pilot, 1
F/V Saga	Elliott Neese	9-10, 11
F/V Saga	Jake Anderson	11, 12–15, 16, 17–18, 19
F/V Saga	Jake Anderson & Johnathan Hillstrand	16
F/V Saga	Jake Anderson, Sophia "Bob" Nielsen & Sean Dwyer	19
F/V Sea Star	Larry Hendricks	Pilot, 1
F/V Seabrooke	Scott Campbell Jr.	7–9, 10, 16
F/V Seabrooke	Brad Petefish	10
F/V Seabrooke	Greg Wallace & Sophia "Bob" Nielsen	20
F/V Southern Wind	Steve "Harley" Davidson	15–16, 17, 18
M/S Stålbas	Sig Hansen	18
F/V Summer Bay	"Wild" Bill Wichrowski	13-18, 20
F/V Summer Bay	"Wild" Bill Wichrowski & Linda Greenlaw	19
F/V Summer Bay	Landon Cheney	20
F/V Titan Explorer	Jake Anderson	20–21
F/V Tromstind	"Wild" Bill Wichrowski	18
F/V Victory	Sophia "Bob" Nielsen	19
F/V Vixen	Shaun Miles^{6}	1
F/V Western Viking	Coleman Anderson	1
F/V Wizard	Keith Colburn	3–9, 10, 11–13, 14, 15, 16, 17–22
F/V Wizard	Monte "Mouse" Colburn^{3}	10, 14, 15, 16, 20, 21, 22

^1Harris was forced to leave during the C. opilio season in season 4 due to what turned out to be a pulmonary embolism and his medical issues prevented him from going out during the king crab portion of season 5. Murray Gamrath relieved him as captain in both seasons. A camera crew stayed with Harris both when he was hospitalized in season 4 and after his forced departure at the start of season 5. He continued to make occasional appearances during season 5. Harris suffered a massive stroke on January 29, 2010, during the filming of the C. opilio season for season 6 and died on February 9, 2010, from complications. Derrick Ray took over as captain for the remainder of the season.

^2Tony Lara, the fourth captain of F/V Cornelia Marie, died on August 8, 2015, in Sturgis, South Dakota, victim of Cardiac arrest while participating in the famed Sturgis Motorcycle Rally, hosted annually in Sturgis.

^3The F/V Elinore J was formally called the Determined, when it was bought by the Dwyer family after the 2018 red king crab season.

^4Not to be confused with former Chicago White Sox, Oakland Athletics and St. Louis Cardinals manager Tony La Russa.

^5Blake Painter died on May 28, 2018, due to an overdose of heroin. His body was found at his home in Astoria, Oregon.

^6The boat did have a film crew on board. However, the footage was never broadcast on the U.S. version, but it did appear in some international versions.

=== Fishing vessels with no embedded film crew ===
Fishing Vessel	Event	Season(s)
Alaska Juris	238-foot factory trawler that requested a medevac of a 25-year-old crewmember who sustained a severe head injury following an accident involving a steel cable. Coast Guard rescue helicopter 6006 arrived on the scene and lowered their rescue swimmer to assess the victim. However, by this time, the victim had succumbed to his injuries.	8
Alaska Mist	At the end of 2013 King Crab season, this 166-foot factory trawler suffered a mechanical failure that the crew was unable to repair at sea that left it drifting 172 miles northeast of Dutch Harbor, near Amak Island on November 11, 2013. USCG dispatched the cutter Waesche and helicopter 6005 for rescue of the ship and its 22 crew members. With two trips, the helicopter successfully rescued 11 non-essential crew members (as shown in "Lost at Sea"), while Waesche towed the vessel and the remaining 11 essential crew members to safety. Waesche lost PO3 Travis Obendorf on December 18, 2013, to a fatal head injury suffered in the rescue attempt.	10
Alaska Ranger	189-foot fishing vessel that took on water in her rudder room and stern and sank on March 23, 2008. The 47 people on board were forced into the water; all but five were rescued.	4
Alaskan Leader	150-foot fishing vessel that called the Coast Guard when crewmember suffered a heart attack. A nighttime rescue attempt by a Coast Guard helicopter had to be aborted. A second rescue attempt the next day by rescue helicopter 6015 was successful. The deckhand, Chad Smith, 40, was medivaced to Anchorage via Saint Paul, and ultimately survived.	6
Alaskan Monarch	Crab fishing vessel that ran aground at St. Paul Island due to ice in 1990. All of the 6 crewmen were saved, but the boat was destroyed.	2, 3
Aleutian Beauty	Crab-fishing vessel that rescued the crew of the Western Venture. Crew-recorded cell phone video showed the fire damage to the Western Venture in greater detail: only the port-side structure was still intact.	10
Amatuli	Chase boat, shown in behind the scenes/lens specials.	7 (sp), 9 (sp)
American Lady	Requested assistance from the F/V Aleutian Lady during both the fall and winter seasons, first for a deckhand injury and later due to mechanical issues.	21
American No. 1	Trawling vessel that encroached on the Northwestern’s fishing gear.	19
American Star	Crab-fishing vessel that caught fire and ran aground in January 2000; all five crewmen plus one dog were rescued by the United States Coast Guard.	1
Arctic Fjord	Requested Coast Guard Medivac for injured crewman. U.S. Coast Guard MH-60 Jayhawk helicopter 6004 attempted a hoist during a storm but then aborted due to the dangerous conditions. It was later determined that the crewman was not as seriously injured as originally thought, and he was taken to Dutch Harbor on board the boat.	14
Arctic Hunter	93-foot crab-fishing vessel that ran aground and took on water about two miles outside of Dutch Harbor. The six-man crew abandoned ship into their life raft, and they were rescued by Captain Elliott Neese and the Saga, the closest rescue-capable ship. The rescue was complicated due to the shallow bottom, which the Saga hit with no apparent damage, and two attempts to tie the rescue line to the life raft. The successful tie-off was accomplished by Elliott's father, Mike Neese.	10
Beauty Bay	Deckhand Brandon Himey was medivaced by a Coast Guard MH-60 Jayhawk after suffering a hand injury from a fish grinder.	9
Bering Sea	111-foot crab fishing vessel that conducted an at-sea transfer of crewman OJ Ganuelas to the Wizard.	19
F/V Big Valley^{1}	92-foot crab fishing vessel that sank at the start of the 2005 C. opilio season; five of six crew died. Coast Guard investigation later determined that the boat was severely overloaded, carrying 30% more pots than normal, causing her to capsize during a storm the morning of January 15, 2005.	1
Blue Gadus	Longline fishing vessel that required a crewman medivac by a USCG helicopter because of a pulmonary embolism; the basket rescue was complicated by 30-foot seas and 100-knot winds.	10
Bountiful	166-foot crab catcher/processor vessel that required a crewman medivac by USCG MH-68 Jayhawk helicopter 6041 due to severe burns after falling into boiling water.	16
Carly Renee	59-foot cod fishing vessel, capsized and partially sank 22 miles from Dutch Harbor at start of 2009 King Crab season; four-man crew abandoned ship and rescued by a "good samaritan vessel", The Guardian. The Carly Renee eventually ran aground on a nearby island and was left for junk.	6
Constellation	Catcher/Processor vessel that required a crewmen medivac by USCG HH-60J helicopter 6030 after their left arm was crushed by a metal door.	18
Courageous	Fishing vessel that assisted in the search for survivors from the fishing vessel Katmai.	5
Defender	135-foot longline fishing vessel that required a medivac by USCG helicopter 6004 after a 21-year-old crewmen had a 50-pound bag of bait fall on his head.	14
Destination	Crab fishing vessel, sank for unknown reasons at beginning of 2017 opilio season. All six crew presumed dead. The season 13 episode "Lost at Sea" was filmed at the time of the incident and is when the Deadliest Catch crews heard the news, first aired on August 22, 2017. Initially all that was found were a few buoys and oil slick indicative of a vessel sinking. The more comprehensive search, completed later that summer, found the vessel in approximately 250 feet of water. Discovery and the cast and crew gave their condolences to the families of the lost crew. This disaster was profiled in a January 24, 2021, episode of Disasters at Sea on the Smithsonian Channel titled Destination Unknown. Johnathan Hillstrand on the F/V Time Bandit was seen in that episode.	13
Foremost	Sverre Hansen's predecessor to the F/V Northwestern. This Alaskan crab fishing vessel sank on 4 May 1977 approximately 75 miles east southeast of Saint George Island toward Cape Sarichef due to a slack tank causing it to capsize. The four-man crew survived, and Sverre commissioned the building of F/V Northwestern to address the stability problems Foremost had with its water tanks. Foremost was first briefly alluded to in the Season 8 episode "Release the Beast" (and later in After the Catch VI episode 5), when Edgar discovered a water-level alarm malfunction caused a slack tank on the F/V Northwestern and he and Sig recalled that is what sank their father's previous boat. Edgar caught the problem in time, repaired the alarm and pumped the excess water from the tank, before a deck full of stacked pots and hold full of crab could cause it to capsize en route to the processor.	8, 10 (sp)
Galaxy	180-foot fishing vessel that caught fire at sea during 2002 king crab season. All 23 crew members were rescued by Coast Guard; three men later died from injuries sustained during the fire.	1
Golden Pisces	F/V Brenna A collided with the bow of this vessel whilst leaving Dutch Harbor in fierce winds. Damage was limited to paint on the bow.	13
The Guardian	99-foot crab fishing vessel that rescued the four-man crew of the Carly Renee after they abandoned ship. Deckhand John Ardenia filmed the rescue using his phone.	6
Handler	Crab fishing vessel that provided a spare hydraulic motor to the Lady Alaska in an at-sea transfer after three of the Lady Alaska's motors burned out.	16
Icy Mist	58-foot cod fishing vessel that took on water and grounded on western shore of Akutan Island; four-man crew evacuated to shore and rescued by Coast Guard.	5
Jennifer A	Partner boat of F/V Time Bandit. Pranked by F/V Time Bandit with a flour pot during the Season 3 wrap-up.	3
Kari Marie	Crab fishing vessel that required a medivac by a USCG helicopter. Deckhand Cody Rhodes suffered a compound fracture in his left leg after a pot fell off the launcher and crushed it while the crew were emptying the pot.	15
Katmai	93-foot head and gut fishing vessel that capsized and sank in the Aleutian Islands early in the morning on Wednesday, October 22, 2008. Only four of the 11 crew members were saved; two were never found. One of the survivors, the vessel's captain, appears on After the Catch 3.	5
Kodiak	Assisted the Saga by giving them one of their spare hydraulic lines when one of the Saga's lines in the block breaks and they are unable to find their spare.	14
Master Carl	Crab fishing vessel that sank in April 1976 returning home from tanner crab season. All four crew members abandoned ship and made it into the life raft, but only two were found alive.	1
Nuka Island	Crab fishing vessel that was hit by a large rogue wave north of St. Paul Island, temporarily disabled.	5
Ocean Challenger	Four-man crew abandoned ship as boat capsized and took on water in October 2006. One survivor; two bodies found; one body lost. Debris field, EPIRB, and an empty life raft found along with an empty survival suit indicated vessel ultimately sank. Rescue efforts were featured in the Season 3 episodes "A Tragic Beginning" and "The Unforgiving Sea".	3
Patricia Lee	Former F/V Summer Bay deckhand Todd Kochutin suffered fatal injuries after being struck by a falling pot onboard this vessel.	17
Paragon	Crab fishing vessel that shadowed the Wizard and was accused of tampering with the Wizard’s pots. The vessel is shown on screen but its markings are digitally obscured.	4
Perseverance	Deadliest Catch Chase Boat, rendered aid to the Lady Alaska after a flooding forward void jeopardized the vessel's stability in the season 16 episode "Chase Boat Rescue", collided with the Wizard in the season 17 episode "Russian Dragger"	16, 17
Predator	A 75-foot fishing vessel that began taking on water and ran aground off the coast of Akutan. All 3 crewmen were rescued by a Coast Guard helicopter.	13
Prowler	Crewman suffered a serious eye injury. Medivaced by USCGC Munro.	10
Raven	86-foot crab fishing vessel that capsized in 2003. All crew rescued by Coast Guard. Later towed to Dutch Harbor and repaired.	pilot
Roaming McGee	Built in the early 1980s, this craft was seen briefly at the docks in the Season 3 episode "The Hammer and Ice".	3
Rosie G	Crab fishing vessel that sank in 1997. Six-man crew escaped in a life raft and were rescued by the Coast Guard.	1
Sandra Five	Jake Anderson was transferred to Sandra Five from the F/V Northwestern to go to Saint Paul Island so that he could fly home to his family after his sister died.	5
Scandies Rose	130-foot crab fishing vessel that sank near Sutwick Island on 31 December 2019 while en route to Dutch Harbor from Kodiak, killing five of the seven crew members on board.	16
Sea Rover	Fishing vessel that assisted in the search for F/V Big Valley.	1
Shaman	Former F/V Sea Star deckhand Terry Rosendahl fell overboard while on the pot stack in 2003 and drowned.	pilot
Silver Spray	First vessel to arrive at the accident site following the sinking of the Destination, recovered the Destination's EPIRB as well as a life ring which allowed the debris field to be identified.	13
Sovereignty	Trawling vessel that the F/V Wizard tied up alongside in Dutch Harbor during the 2024 fall season.	21
St. Patrick	Took a 90-degree list and took on water in engine compartment in December 1981. Eleven-man crew tied themselves together and leapt into the sea when the life boat was lost. Only two men survived. It was later discovered that the boat had righted herself after the crew abandoned ship; the vessel was found adrift by the Coast Guard and towed into port still afloat before she finally sank while moored in port.	1
Starbound	300-foot trawler, nearly collided with the Wizard while it was leaving port	15
Stormbird	Briefly seen in a shot in St. Paul harbor in the season 15 episode "Unbreakable".	15
Sultan	Deckhand Manu Lagai Jr. fell overboard from this 134-foot crab fishing vessel and drowned, becoming the sixth fatality within the first 24 hours of the 2005 opilio season.	1
Tempo Sea	Crab fishing vessel that delivered a replacement coiler motor to the F/V Time Bandit.	17
Trailblazer	Deckhand Josh White fell overboard while tying pots on the stack in October 2006; rescued by F/V Time Bandit.	3
Valiant	Crab Boat that encroached upon the F/V Cornelia Marie's course while emergency repairs to the Cornelia's port main engine were underway	16
Western Venture	Western Venture, as Sig Hansen said, was a 59-foot longline fishing vessel he thought he knew. It was destroyed by an engine fire 60 nautical miles west of Adak early in the shortened 2013 king crab season. The five-man crew abandoned ship and activated its EPIRB. Coast Guard helicopter 6005 and a C-130 Hercules were dispatched for search-and-rescue. The C-130 arrived at the vessel's last known position a half-hour before the helicopter, recorded video of the vessel on fire, and saw that all five crew were in their life raft. Crab-fishing vessel Aleutian Beauty was the closest craft to the scene, and successfully rescued the Western Venture crew from their life raft.	10

^1During the shooting of the first season of Deadliest Catch, the F/V Big Valley sank on January 15, 2005, sometime after 0734 Alaska Standard Time when the Coast Guard first detected her EPIRB signal. Five members of the six-man crew perished; three were never found. Cache Seel was the only survivor. Discovery Channel camera crews on the F/V Maverick and F/V Cornelia Marie captured the first footage of the debris field, confirming that the boat had capsized and gone down. The search for the ship is featured in the episode "Dead of Winter."

=== Non-fishing vessels ===
Vessel Name/Type	Event	Season(s)
USCGC Acushnet^{1} (U.S. Coast Guard cutter)	Assisted in the search and rescue efforts when the Katmai sank.	5
APL Turkey (Containership)	Severed the buoy of one of the Saga’s black cod longline strings, forcing them to drag a large metal hook along the ocean bottom in an effort to recover the pots.	18
USCGC Bertholf (U.S. Coast Guard cutter)	Conducted an at-sea boarding of the F/V Northwestern. Misidentified as "Bertoff" in the caption of radio transmission.	9
Cougar Ace (Pure Car Carrier)	Rolled over during ballast exchange operations of the Aleutian Islands and was towed into Dutch Harbor in the first episode of Season 3	3
Ever Unique (Containership)	Crewmember critically injured with a broken neck and smashed leg by a falling engine block, medivaced by Coast Guard rescue helicopter 6015.	7
FPMC 33 (Liberia-flag bulk carrier)	Required US Coast Guard medivac after a 44-year old crewmen had his legs broken while working on deck.	19
Gyrfalcon (Tugboat)	Assisted the F/V Titan Explorer in leaving Dutch Harbor after strong winds pinned the vessel to the dock.	21
Independence (processor)	Offloaded the opilio from the F/V Time Bandit, anchored at St. Paul in the middle of a dangerous ice pack.	3
Island Enterprise (processor)	51-year old crew member Rafael Orosco was medivaced by United States Coast Guard rescue helicopter 6035 after experiencing a seizure.	4
USCGC Kimball (U.S. Coast Guard cutter)	Seen in Dutch Harbor right before the start of the 2022 fall season.	19
USCGC Midgett (U.S. Coast Guard cutter)	Conducted an at-sea boarding of the F/V Rollo.	2
USCGC Morgenthau^{2} (U.S. Coast Guard cutter)	Assisted in the search for survivors from the missing crab fishing vessel Destination.	13
USCGC Munro (U.S. Coast Guard cutter)	Assisted in search and rescue efforts when the Ocean Challenger sank. In the Season 10 finale, Munro participated in the medical evacuation of an injured crewmember off the Prowler. Munro used Wizard Captain Keith Colburn to demonstrate other rescue techniques in The Bait 2 season finale.	3, 10; The Bait 2.
Ocean Phoenix (processor)	Crewmember medivaced by the United States Coast Guard rescue helicopter.	10
MV Overseas Joyce (U.S.-flag Pure Car Carrier)	Witnessed sinking of Ocean Challenger, unable to render aid.	3
Stellar Sea (processor)	Suffered an engine room fire at the start of the opilio season, forcing the crab boat crews to suspend fishing or look for bairdi crab. Towed back to Dutch Harbor and repaired.	3
P/V Stimson (Alaska Marine Enforcement Section Patrol Vessel)	Assisted in the search and rescue efforts when the F/V Big Valley sank. Recovered the body of crew member Carlos Riviera.	1
USCGC Stratton (U.S. Coast Guard cutter)	Conducted an at-sea boarding of the F/V Time Bandit during the 2024 fall season.	21
USCGC Waesche (U.S. Coast Guard cutter)	Conducted an at-sea boarding of the F/V Time Bandit for spot inspection of safety gear at the start of 2013 King Crab season; identified on radio transmissions only as "Cutter 751". At the end of the 2013 King Crab season, they also assisted in the rescue of the Alaska Mist crew and were more prominently identified in footage and radio transmissions.	10
Westward Wind (processor)	Processor for the F/V Cornelia Marie, anchored at Dutch Harbor for king crab offload.	2, 4 & 5

^1 Instead of footage of USCGC Acushnet (WMEC-167) being shown, footage of USCGC Alex Haley (WMEC-39) was shown.

^2 Instead of footage of USCGC Morgenthau (WHEC-722) being shown, footage of USCGC Alex Haley (WMEC-39) was shown.

== Episodes ==
Deadliest Catch draws consistently high ratings for Discovery Channel; season 3 attracted more than 49 million viewers throughout the season and over 3 million viewers per first-run episode, making it one of 2007's most successful programs on cable TV.

Overall ratings for season 6 exceeded season 5's by more than 10%; as a result, Deadliest Catch regularly wins its U.S. primetime telecast timeslot (Tuesdays, 9:00-10:00 p.m. EST). Ratings for the season opener "Slow Burn" drew a record 4.6 million viewers; on June 22, 2010, "Blown Off Course", the first of five episodes that dealt with Phil Harris's stroke and its impact, drew 5.2 million viewers, more than 10% over "Slow Burn". On July 13, 2010, the episode "Redemption Day", which dealt with the death of Harris at its close, set another record audience for the show with 8.5 million viewers, making the episode the third-most-viewed broadcast in Discovery Channel's history. In 2016, The New York Times study of the 50 TV shows with the most Facebook Likes found that Deadliest Catch was "most popular in areas that are rural, cold and close to the sea, particularly Alaska and Maine".

== Release ==
Deadliest Catch premiered on the Discovery Channel in 2005 and currently airs worldwide. The first season consisted of ten episodes, with the finale airing on June 14, 2005. Subsequent seasons have aired on the same April to June or July schedule every year since. The season premiere for season 22 aired on May 8, 2026.

== Miniseries and extended episodes ==
=== After the Catch (2007-2012) ===
After the Catch is a roundtable, documentary-style television mini-series that follows the captains from Deadliest Catch when they're not fishing. The captains and crew members swap stories about the experiences and sights while fishing the Bering Sea. The spin-off series is produced in partnership with Original Productions and Silent Crow Arts. The first season aired in 2007, filmed at the Lockspot Cafe, a bar in Seattle's Ballard neighborhood, hosted by Deadliest Catch narrator Mike Rowe. After the Catch II aired in 2008, filmed at Pratty's Bar in Gloucester, Massachusetts, and hosted by Rowe. The third season, titled After the Catch III, aired in 2009 and was filmed at RTs Longboard Bar and Grill in San Diego with Cash Cab's Ben Bailey hosting. After the Catch IV aired in 2010 and was filmed at the Blue Nile bar in New Orleans, with Rowe returning as host.

The After the Catch miniseries was one of Discovery Channel's highest-rated miniseries in 2007 and spawned several new after-the-series type follow-up documentaries such as Everest: After the Climb, the 2007 follow-up to Everest: Beyond the Limit.

After the Catch VI was the last season of the post-fishing mini-series. Responding in part to a challenge-in-jest made late in the season by Mike Rowe to the captains to host a show of their own, the format for Season 9 was changed to run throughout the season's air dates. (See The Bait below.)

=== The Bait (2013-2014) ===
The Bait is a "pregame show" roundtable documentary-style television mini-series that previews select episodes of Deadliest Catch since season 9, filmed in Dutch Harbor, and hosted by Sig Hansen, Johnathan, and Andy Hillstrand, and Keith Colburn, with narration by Deadliest Catch narrator Mike Rowe. The captains swap stories about the off-season and hints on what the viewers can expect in that night's episode, with previews of the upcoming season in the king crab and opilio crab kickoffs. Regular features include "The Hot Seat" (interview focused on one Captain or deckhand) and questions from celebrity fans of the show. The spin-off series is produced in partnership with Original Productions and Silent Crow Arts. The first episode, "Opening Day: King Crab," aired on April 16, 2013.

=== On Deck (2013-2014) ===
On Deck is an expanded episode of Deadliest Catch featuring previously unaired footage, production notes, facts, and on occasion, social media comments. On Deck debuted April 23, 2013, and paralleled Season 9.

=== Decked (2014) ===
Decked is a rebroadcast episode of Deadliest Catch featuring webcam CatchChat with one or more Captains between episode segments.

=== Pilot ===
The show was created as a regular series after two well-received pilots about Alaskan crabbing were produced by Thom Beers for the Discovery Channel.

The first pilot was a one-hour documentary entitled Deadliest Job in the World, which appeared in 1999. The show, which started with the sinking of the Rosie G (5 on board, all rescued alive), followed the Fierce Allegiance through the 1999 opilio crab season.

The second pilot was a three-part miniseries entitled America's Deadliest Season, which premiered on July 18, 2004, and covered the 2003–04 king and opilio crab seasons. The miniseries followed the vessels F/V Northwestern, Erla-N, and F/V Sea Star during king crab and Erla-N, Saga, and Arctic Dawn during opilio crab. The series also features several crises, including the half-capsized Raven (5 on board, all rescued alive), man-overboard calls from Shaman (recovered dead) and Saga (greenhorn Kevin Davis, rescued alive), and the constant threat of cold water and freezing spray.

Beers did the voice-over narration for both series. Discovery picked up the show and ordered an 8-episode season to premiere in 2005. Beers turned the narration duties over to fellow Discovery Channel voice artist Mike Rowe, allowing Beers to continue working on new show development through his production company, Original Productions.

=== MythBusters Crabtastic Special ===
A 2013 episode of MythBusters featured Johnathan Hillstrand and Scott Campbell Jr. traveling to M5 Industries in San Francisco to help bust three myths related to crab fishing: that someone can get caught in a pot's rope as it is dumped and be dragged to the bottom (plausible), that 20-minute naps every 6 hours can double effectiveness over a 30-hour shift (confirmed) and that crab pots are impervious to explosives (busted).

=== How It's Made Deadliest Catch Edition ===
The Discovery/Science documentary program How It's Made showed the production of oceanographic buoys, sushi, rubber boots, and industrial wire ropes in this episode featuring items used in or connected with crab fishing. None of the captains, crew members or vessels appeared in the program.

== Spin-offs ==
=== Deadliest Catch: Dungeon Cove ===
A spinoff titled Deadliest Catch: Dungeon Cove premiered on September 12, 2016. The series focused on a handful of boat captains and crews fishing for Dungeness crab off the Oregon Coast. The first season consists of eight episodes with the season finale airing on October 18, 2016. Discovery has not made any formal announcement on whether or not the show has been cancelled.

=== Deadliest Catch: Bloodline ===
A spinoff titled Deadliest Catch: Bloodline premiered on April 14, 2020. The series focuses on Josh Harris and Casey McManus exploring the notes Phil Harris left behind on a fishing chart of the Hawaiian Islands and learning to catch Ahi tuna.

=== Deadliest Catch: The Viking Returns ===
A spinoff titled Deadliest Catch: The Viking Returns premiered on September 13, 2022. The series focuses on Sig Hansen and his daughter, Mandy, as they try their hand at fishing off the coast of Norway after the Alaskan red king crab fishery is shut down. Sig brings along son-in-law Clark Pederson, one of his crew members from the F/V Northwestern, to join him and Mandy. In order to catch over $1 million in Norwegian red king crab quota, the Hansen family return to the M/S Stålbas to catch it. Mandy, in order to lure Saga captain and co-owner Jake Anderson, into going fishing with them, offers him a 10% ownership stake into the business, taken from her own percentage.

=== Deadliest Catch: Northern Edge ===
A spinoff titled Deadliest Catch: Northern Edge was announced in May 2026. It will premiere in the first quarter of 2027 and follow a crab fishing fleet in the North Atlantic off the coast of Newfoundland.

== Related media ==
=== Books ===
In April 2008, Andy and Johnathan Hillstrand, co-captains of the F/V Time Bandit, with Malcolm MacPherson, released a book titled Time Bandit: Two Brothers, the Bering Sea, and One of the World's Deadliest Jobs (ISBN 978-0345503725) on their experiences as crab fishermen.

Also, in April 2008, Discovery Channel released the book Deadliest Catch: Desperate Hours (ISBN 978-0696239427). Edited by Larry Erikson, the book contains true stories of life and death at sea, as related by the captains and deckhands featured on the series.

In December 2009, Travis Arket, deckhand of the North American, released a book titled Deadliest Waters: Bering Sea Photography (ISBN 978-1935359210). This book is the first photography collection to be published about Bering Sea crab fishing and includes many people from Deadliest Catch.

In March 2010, Sig Hansen, captain of the F/V Northwestern, released the book North by Northwestern: A Seafaring Family on Deadly Alaskan Waters (ISBN 978-0312591144), cowritten with the author Mark Sundeen. The book details the Hansen family's history and that of Norwegian Americans in the fishing industry of the Pacific Northwest.

In April 2013, Josh and Jake Harris released the book Captain Phil Harris: The Legendary Crab Fisherman, Our Hero, Our Dad (ISBN 978-1451666045), co-written with best-selling author Steve Springer and Blake Chavez. The book details the hard and fast life, and death of the hard-working F/V Cornelia Marie crab fisherman, who was described as always openhearted and infectiously friendly, a devoted friend, a loving father, a steadfast captain, and a hero to audiences across America and around the world.

=== Video games ===
In February 2008, Sig Hansen and Liquid Dragon Studios announced the upcoming release of a video game for Xbox 360 and PC inspired by the Deadliest Catch series entitled Deadliest Catch: Alaskan Storm. Liquid Dragon designers spent time with the Hansens on the F/V Northwestern in the safety of Dutch Harbor and out on the Bering Sea to give them a sense of the real conditions that needed to be duplicated in the game. The game itself features the F/V Northwestern, F/V Cornelia Marie, and F/V Sea Star as crab boats that can be chosen by the player, along with the Bering Star and the Shellfish. On June 17, 2008, the game was released in stores around North America.

A second game, titled Deadliest Catch: Sea of Chaos, was announced in June 2010 and released in November 2010. It is developed by DoubleTap Games and published by Crave Entertainment.

A mobile game developed by Tapinator, Inc. named Deadliest Catch: Seas of Fury, launched on July 13, 2015.

== Reception ==
=== Critical response ===
In 2011, Matt Zoller Seitz of Salon.com praised Deadliest Catch as a reality program that is "really a documentary series about the toll taken by relentless physical labor", and stated that other series trying to emulate it such as Ice Road Truckers and Swamp People "tend to miss the atmosphere and deep attention to psychology that make this series so special."
