= FV Big Valley =

Shipwrecked American fishing ship

Coordinates: 57.2196°N 171.8701°W

History

United States
- Name: F/V Big Valley
- Owner: Gary Edwards
- Out of service: 2005
- Home port: Kodiak, Alaska
- Identification: IMO number: 7050327
- Fate: Sunk January 15, 2005

General characteristics
- Class & type: Fishing vessel
- Length: 92 ft (28 m)
- Beam: 23 ft (7.0 m)
- Draft: 12 ft (3.7 m)
- Installed power: Twin 350 hp (260 kW) Detroit Diesel engine
- Speed: 10 knots (19 km/h; 12 mph)
- Capacity: 31 crab pots
- Crew: 6

F/V Big Valley was a 92-foot (28 m) crab fishing vessel. The vessel capsized and sank on January 15, 2005, in the Bering Sea in an area 70 miles (110 km) west of Saint Paul Island, Alaska. Only one member of the crew survived of the six people on board.

== Sinking ==
The vessel's Emergency position-indicating radiobeacon station (EPIRB) went off around 8 am AST (UTC−9), at the beginning of the 2005 opilio crab hunting season. Three fishing vessels (F/V Cornelia Marie, F/V Maverick and Sea Rover), United States Coast Guard ship USCGC Sherman, the Alaska state patrol boat Stimson, and a Coast Guard helicopter out of Saint Paul Island were involved in the search.

The helicopter rescued the only crewmember to make it to the life raft. Two others, who were wearing survival suits like the survivor, were found deceased in the water. One was recovered by the helicopter, and the other was recovered by Stimson. Three others fell into the water without survival suits, and their bodies were never found. According to the survivor's account, two were thrown overboard while trying to release the life raft. One ultimately freed it, but only the survivor made it to the raft after 50 minutes in the water. The survivor was taken to Kodiak, Alaska, and ultimately recovered, gave authorities his account of the event, clearing up details of the night. He reported that there was no icing occurring on the deck and the boat was carrying 50 pots for crab fishing.

The Coast Guard had limited the Big Valley, one of the smallest boats that participated in the crab fishery, to carrying 31 crab pots. She left Dutch Harbor in Unalaska, Alaska, for her final trip with 55 pots and 13,000 lb (5,900 kg) of bait, more than three times the amount allowed, according to the Coast Guard investigation. That extra weight contributed to her fate, the investigation found.

== Popular culture ==
The search for Big Valley was covered in an episode of the television show, Deadliest Catch. It was Big Valley's captain who demonstrated the EPIRB for the show. The boat was also part of the pilot episode of Deadliest Catch in 2004. There were no known cameras or production crew on board the boat when it sank in 2005.
