= Mark Sundeen =

American author (born 1970)

Mark Sundeen (born 1970) is an American author. His book Car Camping was published by HarperCollins in 2000. His book The Making of Toro was published by Simon & Schuster in 2003. North by Northwestern: A Seafaring Family on Deadly Alaskan Waters (ISBN 978-0312591144) was released in early 2010. His nonfiction articles have appeared in The New York Times Magazine, The Believer, Outside Magazine and McSweeney's. His book The Man Who Quit Money (2012) tells the story of Suelo, currently living part-time in a cave near Moab, Utah when he is not wandering the country, who has practiced his form of simple living since 2000.

Sundeen was born in Harbor City, California, in 1970 and grew up in the Los Angeles suburbs of Manhattan Beach and Hermosa Beach. He graduated from Stanford University in 1992 with a degree in English and later moved to Moab, Utah. He later earned a master's degree in creative writing from the University of Southern California. In 2004, Sundeen worked as a blogger for Howard Dean's presidential campaign. Currently living in Montana and Utah, Sundeen instructs Outward Bound programs and teaches college-level creative writing courses in addition to writing his books.

== Bibliography ==
- Car Camping, HarperCollins, 2000
- The Making of Toro, Simon & Schuster, 2003
- The Man Who Quit Money, Riverhead, 2012
- The Unsettlers, Riverhead, 2017
