= FV Northwestern =

American fishing vessel, featured on the TV series "Deadliest Catch"

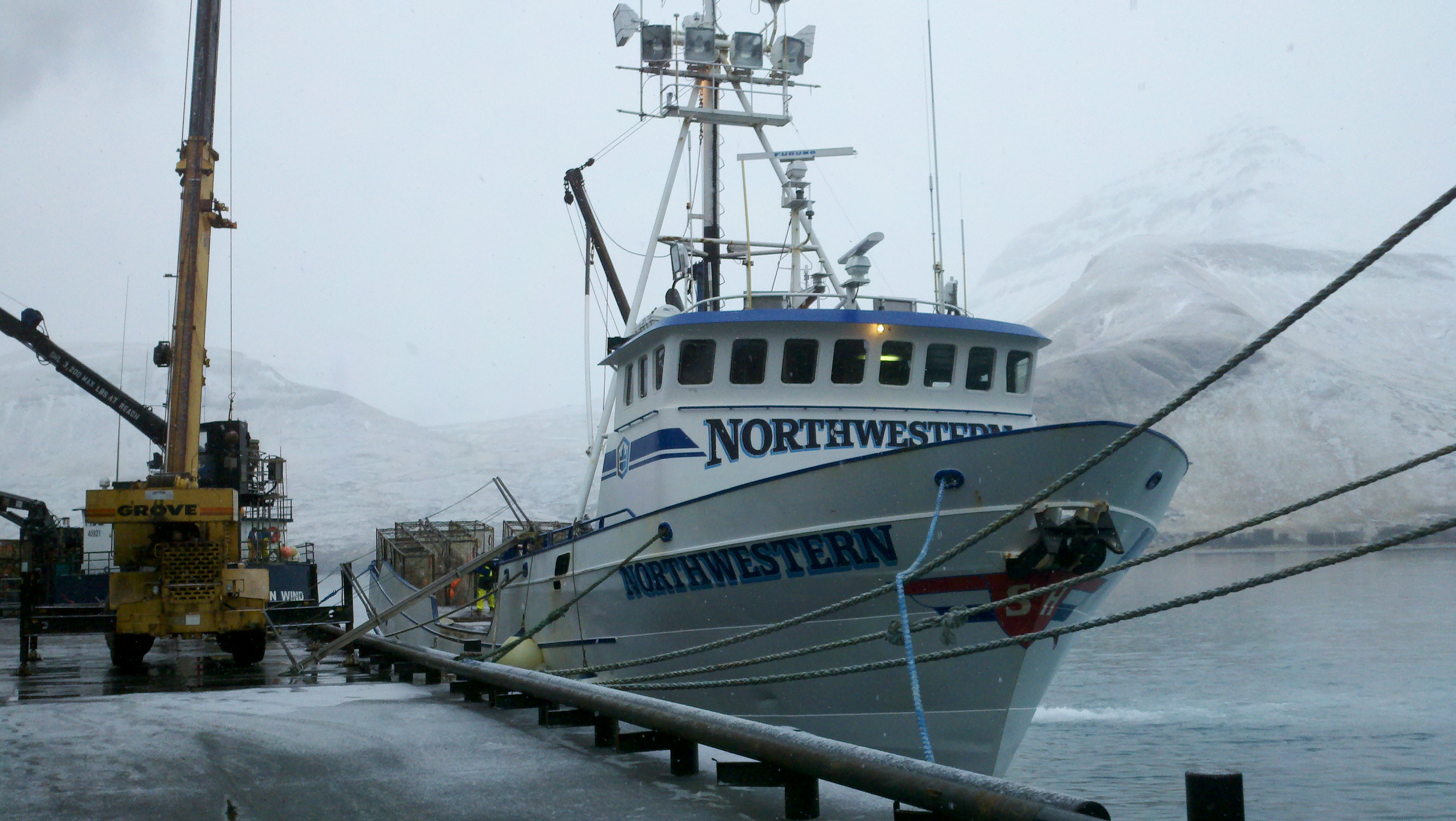
- F/V Northwestern docked at the Trident Seafoods shore plant in Akutan, Alaska

History

United States
- Name: F/V Northwestern
- Owner: Sig, Norman, and Edgar Hansen
- Operator: Sig, Edgar, and Mandy Hansen
- Builder: Marco Shipyards, Seattle, Washington
- Yard number: 342, Seattle, Washington
- Christened: 5 November 1977, by Mrs. Snefryd Hansen
- Completed: 1977
- In service: 1977
- Home port: Seattle, Washington
- Identification: IMO number: 7719179; MMSI number: 367363350; Callsign: WDE5199
- Status: Active
- Notes: Featured in the Discovery Channel reality television show Deadliest Catch

General characteristics
- Class & type: Fishing vessel, western rigged
- Tonnage: 197 gross, 134 net
- Length: 125 ft (38 m); was lengthened from 108 ft (33 m) to 118 ft (36 m) in 1987 and again to 125 ft (38 m) in 1991
- Beam: 28.92 ft (8.81 m)
- Draft: 13 ft (4.0 m)
- Depth: 14.5 ft (4.4 m)
- Installed power: 1,280 hp (950 kW)
- Propulsion: Diesel marine engine (Caterpillar 3512 V-12), single propeller. Additionally a 3304 (4CYL) Hotel Engine. Caterpillar 3306 (2) for Electric & Hydraulic Power.
- Speed: 12 knots (22 km/h; 14 mph)
- Capacity: 195 crab pots (Pre-Rationalization was 250 Pots)
- Crew: 7
- Notes: Hull and superstructure, white; trim, dark blue

F/V Northwestern is an Alaskan crab, Pacific cod, and salmon tendering commercial fishing vessel featured in the Discovery Channel series Deadliest Catch. To date the Northwestern is the only vessel to have featured on all 22 seasons of Deadliest Catch as well as the pilot series America's Deadliest Season. The vessel is owned and operated by the Hansen family of the state of Washington with Sig Hansen serving as the vessel's primary captain.

== History ==
The F/V Northwestern, a western rigged boat, was constructed in 1977 at Marco Shipyards in Seattle, Washington for the sole purpose of fishing King and Tanner Crab off of the coast of Alaska. It was christened F/V Northwestern on 1977 November 5 by Snefryd Hansen, the wife of then-owner and captain Sverre Hansen. The vessel is currently owned and operated by Sverre and Snefryd's three sons: Sigurd (Sig), Norman, and Edgar Hansen. Sig serves as the vessel's primary captain with his younger brother Edgar, and his daughter Mandy Hansen, also running the boat on occasion. Edgar primarily serves as the Northwestern's deck boss. Edgar also served as relief captain and engineer for several years, before Mandy took over as the full-time relief captain, and Norman took over as the primary engineer.

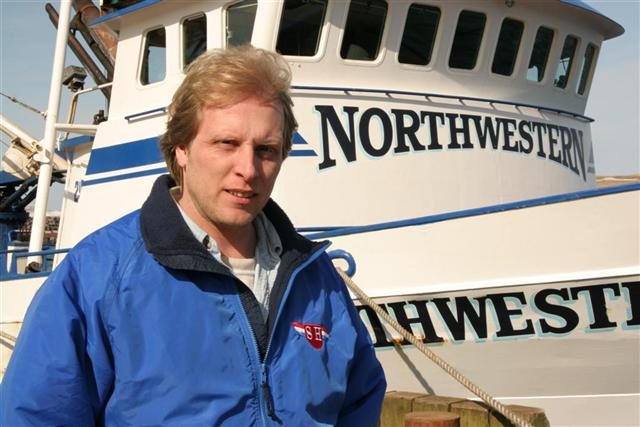
Captain Sig Hansen in front of the F/V Northwestern

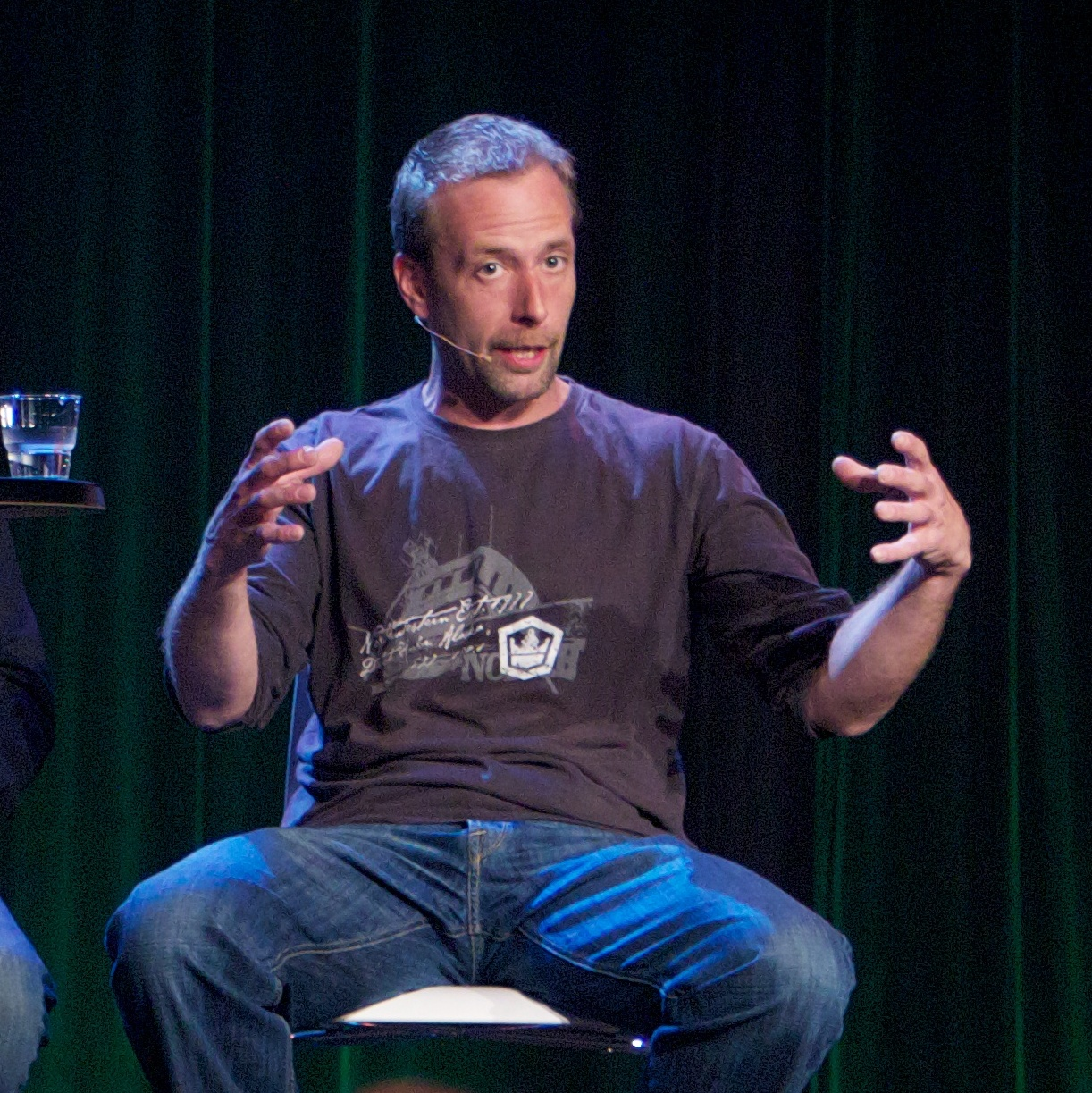
Edgar Hansen

In the 1980s the boat was one of the first to fish opilio crab. Throughout the 1980s the Northwestern kept very busy year round, fishing opilio crab, blue king crab, red king crab, and brown king crab at different times of the year.

To keep up with the increasing demand for crab in the late 1980s and early 1990s, boats needed to carry more pots (steel box shaped traps that are used to fish for crab). Rather than buy a new boat, the Hansen family decided to have the Northwestern extended twice. Originally built at 108 feet (32.9 m) with the ability to carry 156 pots, the Northwestern was extended to 118 feet (36.0 m) in 1987 to allow for 200 pots. In 1991, when the maximum crab pots a boat could carry was raised to 250, the Hansen's again had the Northwestern lengthened, this time to 125 feet (38 m). Today, in the IFQ system, they usually carry no more than 195 pots.

The Hansen brothers worked aboard the Northwestern as deckhands throughout their childhood, and all three decided to make fishing their profession, joining a long line of Hansen men making their living as fishermen. Sig, the oldest of the three, took over as captain of the Northwestern full-time in 1990. Under his leadership, the Northwestern boasts an astounding record of never having suffered a death at sea despite its home territory being the dangerous Alaskan crab grounds, where deaths average nearly one fisherman per week during the heart of its productive seasons.

== Current status ==
Today, the Northwestern continues to fish red king crab, tanner crab, and opilio crab; however, it is now one of few boats to engage in pot cod fishing as well, which was filmed for episodes of Deadliest Catch during the 2006 Opilio crab season. The Northwestern was one of the few vessels to fish for blue king crab in 2009 after completing its red king crab season. During the summer, the vessel keeps busy tendering (transporting fish from vessels at sea to floating processors, allowing the fishing boats to stay on the grounds rather than make repeated trips back to port) salmon and herring, usually under the command of Edgar Hansen.

The Northwestern is one of the most successful boats in the crab fishing fleet. The vessel won both the tonnage and price titles in both the final king crab derby in 2005 and the final opilio crab derby in 2006. The vessel has become popular and very recognizable due to it being prominently featured in the Discovery Channel series Deadliest Catch.

In addition to the Hansen brothers, the remainder of the crew includes longtime deckhands Matt Bradley (Edgar's childhood friend), Nick Mavar Jr. and Nick's nephew, Jake Anderson. Jake earned full-share deckhand status on the Northwestern during the 2009 opilio season, and continued to fish on the boat several more seasons before taking over as captain of the F/V Saga in 2014. Matt would also leave the boat on occasions as well and has since permanently joined Jake on the F/V Saga by the 2019 king crab season. Karl Rasmussen, the grandson of one of the Northwestern's quota leasers, joined the crew in 2014. Sig's daughter Mandy, has fished on the boat during salmon season, and she had been an intermittent crew member during earlier seasons of the show. Before the 2016 red king crab season, Sig's son-in-law, Clark Pederson (Mandy's husband), became the latest to join the Northwestern crew.

During the middle of the 2018 opilio season, Mandy has started training under her father to become the Northwestern's relief captain. By the start of the 2018 king crab season, she permanently joined the crew as full-time relief captain and captain-in-training, with Sig grooming her to one day take over the family business. In the summer of 2019, Mandy and Clark alternated to run the boat, for salmon tendering. During the boat's first trip, right before the start of the 2019 red king crab season, Mandy took the boat out by herself for the first time as captain, to set up storage pots out in the fishing grounds, before Sig came up to take control of the boat, for the season.

In the summer of 2020, Mandy and Clark once again took control of the Northwestern for salmon tendering season. Mandy is also responsible for hiring the crew for the boat.

== Non-Alaskan seafood ==
The Hansen brothers, owners/operators of the Northwestern, endorsed a brand of Russian King Crab being sold at discount chains such as Walmart. The decision to put the Northwestern name and colors on a non-Alaskan product has caused some controversy in the Alaskan fishing community, which the Hansens addressed in a November 2007 press release. In the press release, the Hansens noted that 50-70 percent of Alaskan King Crab was purchased by Japan and never reached U.S. stores or restaurants; by bringing Russian King Crab to the American market, the Hansens hoped that the increased demand for King Crab would benefit the Alaskan fishing fleet by raising the price of King Crab overall.

== In fiction ==
The F/V Northwestern inspired the character Crabby the Boat in the film Cars 2 and was voiced by Sig Hansen.

The comedy show South Park briefly spoofed the vessel and its workers in the episode "Whale Whores", when Stan was leading the Sea Shepherd Conservation Society.

== See also ==
- Alaskan king crab fishing
