= Sig Hansen =

American nautical captain and television personality

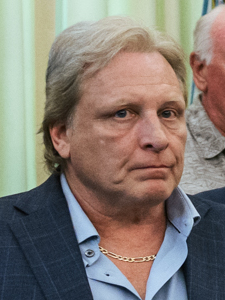
- Hansen in 2026
- Born: Sigurd Jonny Hansen; April 28, 1966 (age 60); Seattle, Washington, U.S.
- Occupations: Captain, FV Northwestern author, voice actor
- Spouse: June Hansen
- Children: 3

Sigurd Jonny Hansen (born April 28, 1966) is a Norwegian-American captain and co-owner of the fishing vessel FV Northwestern. Since 2005, Hansen has been featured in each season of the documentary television series Deadliest Catch, serving also as technical advisor for the production and also stars in Deadliest Catch: The Viking Returns.

== Early life ==
Sigurd Jonny Hansen was born in Seattle, the eldest of three sons; his brothers are Norman and Edgar. Their father, Sverre Hansen, was descended from a long line of Norwegian-ancestry fishermen. His father and grandfather pioneered opilio crab fishing in Alaska as a way of giving crab boats a chance to earn money year-round rather than in short-term or late-year seasons. He began fishing at age 14, working on his family's boat. After he graduated from high school, he began fishing year-round, spending on average 10 months per year in Alaska and the Bering Sea. Occasionally he also fished mackerel and cod in Norway during the summer. In his early years, he cut school so that he could go fishing.

== Career ==
Hansen started as a deckhand on his father's boat before his teenage years, working his way up the ranks. At age 22, he became a “relief skipper”, relieving other captains on the Northwestern, as well as doing short-haul stints on other boats in the fleet. By age 24, he began running the Northwestern full-time. Over the years, the boat has become a top producer with an excellent safety record; it has never had a single death at sea in the nearly 20 years Hansen has been at its helm, and its serious injury rate is significantly lower than other boats in the Bering Sea fleet as well. In 2005 for King Crab and 2006 for Opilio, the Northwestern won the final derby seasons, taking home the titles for both the highest poundage caught and the highest dollars earned amongst the featured boats in the Deadliest Catch. As of 2011, Hansen serves as the full-time captain during king and opilio crab seasons, as well as the pot cod fishery on the Northwestern. His younger brothers, Edgar and Norman, have both spent years working on deck with Norman being the current boat engineer.

In March 2010, Hansen became a published author with the release of his book (co-written with Mark Sundeen) North By Northwestern: A Seafaring Family on Deadly Alaskan Waters, which reached the bestseller list of the New York Times and the Wall Street Journal.

On April 29, 2010, Hansen was a guest on The Tonight Show with Jay Leno. During the show, he expressed his desire to be a contestant on the next season of the hit ABC reality television series Dancing with the Stars. Leno's staff set up a Facebook page to gather support for him to be selected for the show. In September 2010, Hansen announced that he would not return for the seventh season of Deadliest Catch. However, in October 2010, it was announced that Hansen would come back to the show.

He provided the voice of a boat named Crabby (modeled after the Northwestern) in the Disney Pixar film Cars 2. He competed in the 14th season of The Celebrity Apprentice.

In 2014, Hansen was inducted into the Scandinavian-American Hall of Fame along with Tonight Show bandleader Doc Severinsen and singer Bobby Vee.

== Personal life ==
Hansen has two adopted daughters with his wife June, and lives in Seattle. He has three grandchildren. He also has a biological daughter from a previous marriage. His youngest adopted daughter, Mandy, has joined him on the Northwestern as his relief captain. Like her sisters, Mandy speaks fluent Norwegian, which she learned before speaking English, as Sig Hansen’s Norwegian parents spoke it at home. He is an alumnus of Shorewood High School and a supporter of Seattle-based sports teams, the Seattle Seahawks and the Seattle Mariners. Sig also owns the Norwegian island of Mortholmen where Sig and his brothers crab fished as children.

In March 2016, Hansen suffered a heart attack, which was recorded and shown on Discovery Channel's Deadliest Catch. He returned to fishing the following season.

In early October 2018, right before the king crab season, he suffered a severe allergic reaction to an antibiotic, which caused a second heart attack. He had to be medically cleared before he could return to fish and film the show's 15th season.
