= Hematodinium =

Scientific classification
- Domain: Eukaryota
- Clade: Sar
- Clade: Alveolata
- Division: Dinoflagellata
- Class: Syndiniophyceae
- Order: Syndiniales
- Family: Syndiniaceae
- Genus: Hematodinium; Chatton & Poisson, 1930

Species
- Hematodinium australis; Hematodinium perezi

Genus of single-celled organisms

Hematodinium is a genus of dinoflagellates. Species in this genus, such as Hematodinium perezi, the type species, are internal parasites of the hemolymph of crustaceans such as the Atlantic blue crab (Callinectes sapidus) and Norway lobster (Nephrops norvegicus). Species in the genus are economically damaging to commercial crab fisheries, including causing bitter crab disease in the large Tanner or snow crab fisheries of the Bering Sea.

== Introduction ==
Hematodinium is a harmful parasitic dinoflagellate in marine decapod crustaceans, often dwelling in the hemolymph of host organisms. Drastic changes in the host's vital organs, tissues, and hemolymph lead to the degeneration of the organism. Previous studies indicate that species in the genus Hematodium affect many organisms in Order Decapoda, and may also affect Order Amphipoda, and subclass Copepoda. These crustacean taxa include crabs, lobsters, crayfish, prawns, and shrimp – all commercially important food sources for many countries. The effects of Hematodinium parasites are aggressive and can be lethal, thus capable of eradicating entire crab populations. Discoveries of Hematodinium pathogens in decapods span from the western Atlantic Ocean to southern Australia. As a result of the prevalence of Hematodinium in many ocean waters, significant damage is done to many fishery industries around the globe.

== History of knowledge ==
Hematodinium perezi is one of the first species to have been studied in the genus Hematodinium. This organism is well-known and is consequently used as the main study subject for this genus. The first declaration of H. perezi was made in 1931 by Chatton and Poisson off the coasts of Normandy and France. They were discovered in swimming crabs Carcinus maenas and Liocarcinus depurator. At that time, Chatton and Poisson's studies were not successful in generating reliable data on Hematodinium. This was because only a small percentage of tested crabs showed indications that they carried the H. perezi parasite. Nonetheless, future discoveries of similar diseases in other crabs have been linked back to H. perezi since Chatton and Poisson's first sighting. Later affected crabs include Cancer pagurus, and Necora puber.

A second species Hematodinium australis found in Australia was distinguished from H. perezi. Besides its southern hemispheric location, the trophont size as well as the presence of rounded plasmodial stages differed between parasitic groups. Molecular research confirmed the separation of H. australis from H. perezi.

Up until now, there are only a few determining characteristics between Hematodinium species. All known species are found in crustacean hosts, have hemolymph-dwelling filamentous plasmodial stages, intrusive amoeboid trophont infections, and a dinokaryon.

Species in speculated to belong to the genus Hematodinium are currently in need of further research. Lack of comparative work between the type species and the latest species discoveries prevent exploration of the diversity of genus Hematodinium. Difficulties arise due to the inaccessibility of representative type materials to use for comparative studies and only a meager list of useful physical characteristics available between the type species and potential Hematodinium parasites. Therefore, newly discovered taxa are designated the general classification of Hematodinium sp. or are referred to being Hematodinium-like. In some cases, new parasite discoveries are incorrectly identified as H. perezi due to their close resemblance to the type species.

== Habitat and ecology ==
At the time of Small's (2012) studies, 38 host crustacean species had been affected by Hematodinium parasites. Some of the economically important infected hosts include tanner and snow crabs from the Northeast Pacific and Atlantic Oceans, blue crabs in the Atlantic and Gulf coasts of the United States, Norwegian lobsters, and edible crabs from Europe. It is anticipated that the geographical spread of Hematodinium will grow and reach various other aquatic regions globally due to oceanic currents, host movements, and habitat expansions, as well as transportation vessels. Furthermore, as new crustacean species are targeted and fished as commercial seafood, new species of pathogens may be discovered. This was the case in a recent finding in multiple Asian crustacean farm facilities. notes that only aquaculture species from southern and eastern China have been documented, which include the swimming crab (P. trituberculatus), the mud crab (S. serrata), and the ridgetail white prawn (Exopalaemon carinicauda). In addition, a small new finding of Hematodinium parasites in crustaceans was also recently discovered in Russian waters.

=== Recent findings from infected Chinese crustacean farms ===
In 2004, swimming crabs P. trituberculatus from Zhoushan were diagnosed with "milky disease". They showed signs of lethargy due to the development of white muscle tissues and milky hemolymph. In addition, these crabs had a deficiency in cellular hemolymph and developed discolored shells. Over 3000 acres of coastal aquatic culture were affected, with death rates as high as 60%. This was the first noted outbreak of its kind in China.

In 2005, mud crabs S. serrata were infected with "yellow water disease" in Zhejiang Province. Hematodinium trophonts, prespores, and dinospore stages were present in studied individuals. Affected mud crabs were thinner than usual, had white muscle mass, and had abnormal milky liquids below the carapace. Other mud crab culture regions in that same year were also hit with Hematodinium infections. During transit in between shipments, affected crabs had a 'cooked' orange appearance and died shortly after.

In 2008, a disastrous Hematodinium infection epidemic shook ridgetail white prawn (E. carinicauda) aquacultures in Zhoushan. Shrimp were languid and had white muscles in their appendages. Most notable is the white colour of their hemolymph, giving the illness the name "milky shrimp disease." Mortality rates reached 100%, completely wiping out many aquafarms.

Research on the aforementioned epidemics shows that the same parasite is able to infect multiple crustacean hosts, as amplified partial SSU gene and ITS1 rDNA regions from the parasite infecting ridgetail white prawns were exceedingly similar to the sequences from parasites infecting swimming crabs and mud crabs.

=== Recent findings from infected Russian crustacean farms ===
Red king crabs P. camtschaticus and blue king crabs P. platypus from the Sea of Okhotsk in Russia studied in late 2006 had a tiny percentage of individuals that showed symptoms of a Hematodinium infection. Scientists found that king crab hemolymphs developed a cream color following parasite acquisition. Furthermore, prepared crab meat was unpalatable and was reminiscent of "bitter crab disease" described in Tanner crabs. Vast numbers of Hematodinium parasites ranging from different vegetative life stages were present in all sampled crab tissues.

== Description of the organism ==
Species belonging to the genus Hematodinium bear the key identifying characteristics of dinoflagellates. These include a dinokaryon, a pellicle, naked gymnodinoid dinospores, and dinomitosis. Because only a handful of species in this genus have been studied, there is a poor understanding of their life cycle.

Scientists speculate that spore ingestion is the main transmission pathway in which crustacean hosts acquire Hematodinium parasites. However, cannibalism with the ingestion of trophonts is another possibility. Vegetative cells known as trophonts are usually located in the host's hemolymph and quickly multiply via schizogony. Plasmodia containing 2 to 8 nuclei are motile in H. perezi. Sporulation follows, leading to the formation of prespores and then of dinospores. Dinospores supposedly exit the host through small openings in the carapace or through antennal glands. Macrospores are slightly larger than microspores by a few micrometers, and both are able to withstand ocean water conditions for several days.

Discrepancies in life stages can occur due to the timing of parasite acquisition as well as due to varying maturation rates of parasites in different hosts. For example, in host C. bairdi, sporulation can occur in more or less than a year. In contrast, studies concerning hosts Portunus pelagicus and Scylla serrata suggest a faster development rate of Hematodinium parasites.

=== Life cycle of Hematodinium sp. in host Nephrops norvegicus ===
One particular species with a known life cycle is the unnamed Hematodinium parasite taken from host Nephrops norvegicus. Appleton and Vickerman's in vitro experiments describe the fusion of macrodinospores and microdinospores to produce filamentous trophonts that form colonies known as 'Gorgonlocks.' Next, these Gorgonlocks either progress into 'clump' colonies or become an interconnected plasmodial colony known as an arachnoid trophont. The arachnoid trophont enlarges to form an arachnoid sporont, which enters sporogony to produce sporoblasts. Sporogenesis follows in which sporoblasts develop into macro- and microspores, coming full circle with the life cycle. They suggest that the life stage that scientists often encounter Hematodinium sp. is sporogony. However, other researchers oppose their proposition as trophic stages have been found in other hosts.

=== Two examples of partial life cycles of Hematodinium sp. ===
An incomplete life cycle of a Hematodinium species in the hemolymph of host Chionoecetes bairdi was also documented. The plasmodial trophont produced amoeboid trophonts, which then morphed into prespores and dinospores. Researchers described macrodinospores measuring between 12 and 14 mm long and microspores between 7 and 9 mm long.

Another partial life cycle of Hematodinium sp. was observed in the host Callinectes sapidus. This life history contrasts that of the parasite found in N. norvegicus described earlier. The vermiform plasmodium either buds to create more plasmodia, or it enters merogony. The vegetative amoeboid trophonts detach during segmentation, in which fission processes follow. Eventually, the amoeboid trophonts stop for a final fission division, as a result of high cellular densities. They proceed to a final sporogonal division to produce four dinospores.

== Practical importance ==
Crustaceans make up a significant fraction of globally imported marine shellfish. They are economically important worldwide, therefore a single epidemic can result in a monetary loss starting at hundreds of thousands of dollars. Parasites belonging to the genus Hematodinium contribute to the mortality rates of commercial crustaceans, thus able to initiate the decline of the crustacean market. A notable example is the economic effect of the "bitter crab disease" caused by Hematodinium sp. on southeast Alaskan crabs. This infection alters the biochemical composition of crustacean flesh, resulting in an unpleasant change in taste. It takes only one affected host for the disease to sweep an entire shipment of crabs. More than $250,000 was lost as a result of higher-than-normal crab mortality rates. Moreover, the state of Virginia faces an annual $500k to $1 million deficit as a result of unlisted declines in crustacean Callinectes sapidus populations during summer and autumn in highly saline waters.

A complete assessment of the impact of Hematodinium sp. on commercialized shellfish is not possible due to the nature of living goods. Dead and/or distant crustaceans cannot be analyzed for parasitic infections. Young crabs and mature female crabs are often overlooked as well.

Scientists have used several methods in the diagnosis of Hematodinium sp. in crustacean hosts. These include visual examination, wet smears, neutral red staining, histology, and molecular detection. Funding for further research on the impact of Hematodinium sp. on fisheries can be justified by the possible development of more versatile scientific methods to identify other 'at risk' crustacean populations.

== List of species ==
- Hematodinium perezi
- Hematodinium australis

== Bibliography ==
- Appleton, P. L.; Vickerman, K. V. (1998). "In vitro cultivation and development cycle in culture of a parasitic dinoflagellate (Hematodinium sp.) associated with mortality of the Norway lobster (Nephrops norvegicus) in British waters" (PDF). Parasitology. 116 (2): 115–130. doi:10.1017/S0031182097002096. PMID 9509021. S2CID 13847064. Archived from the original (PDF) on 2019-02-19.
- Eaton, W. D.; Love, D. C.; Botelho, C.; Meyers, T. R.; Imamura, K.; Koeneman, T. (1991). "Preliminary results on the seasonality and life cycle of the parasitic dinoflagellate causing Bitter Crab Disease in Alaskan Tanner crabs (Chionoecetes bairdi)". J. Invertebr. Pathol. 57 (3): 426–434. doi:10.1016/0022-2011(91)90147-I. PMID 2066578.
- Gornik, S. G.; Cranenburgh, A.; Waller, R. F. (2013). "New host range for Hematodinium in southern Australia and novel tools for sensitive detection of parasitic dinoflagellates". PLOS ONE. 8 (12) e82774. Bibcode:2013PLoSO...882774G. doi:10.1371/journal.pone.0082774. PMC 3855790. PMID 24324829.
- Hudson, D. A.; Shields, J. D. (1994). "Hematodinium australis n. sp., a parasitic dinoflagellate of the sand crab Portunus pelagicus from Moreton Bay, Australia". Dis. Aquat. Org. 19: 109–119. doi:10.3354/dao019109.
- Kennedy, Victor S.; Cronin, L. Eugene (2007). Blue Crab: Callinectes sapidus. College Park, Md.: Maryland Sea Grant College. ISBN 978-0-943676-67-8.
- Latrouite, D.; Morizur, Y.; Noël, P.; Chagot, D.; Wilhelm, G. (1988). "Mortalite du tourteau Cancer pagurus provoquee par le dinoflagellate parasite: Hematodinium sp". Comité des Mollusques et Crustacés. CM, 1988/K: 32.
- Li, Y. Y.; Xia, X. A.; Wu, Q. Y.; Liu, W. H.; Lin, Y. S. (2008). "Infection with Hematodinium sp. In mud crabs Scylla serrata cultured in low salinity water in southern China" (PDF). Diseases of Aquatic Organisms. 82 (2): 145–150. doi:10.3354/dao01988. PMID 19149377.
- Lohan, K. M. P.; Reece, K. S.; Miller, T. L.; Wheeler, K. N.; Small, H. J.; Shields, J. D. (2012). "The role of alternate hosts in the ecology and life history of Hematodinium sp., a parasitic dinoflagellate of the blue crab (Callinectes sapidus)". J. Parasitol. 98 (1): 73–84. doi:10.1645/GE-2854.1. PMID 21812642. S2CID 15036050.
- Manier, J. F.; Fize, A.; Grizel, H. (1971). "Syndinium gammari n. sp. péridinien Dubosquodinida Syndinidae, parasite de Gammarus locusta (Lin.) Crustacè Amphipode". Protistologica. 7: 213–9.
- Meyers, T. R.; Koeneman, T. M.; Bothelho, C.; Short, S. (1987). "Bitter Crab Disease: A fatal dinoflagellate infection and marketing problem for Alaskan Tanner crabs Chionoecetes bairdii" (PDF). Dis. Aquat. Org. 3: 195–216. doi:10.3354/dao003195.
- Phillips, Bruce F. (2006). Lobsters: Biology, Management, Aquaculture and Fisheries. Oxford, UK; Ames, Iowa: Blackwell Pub. ISBN 978-1-4051-2657-1.
- Ryazanova, T. V. (2008). "Bitter crab syndrome in two species of king crabs from the Sea of Okhotsk". Russ. J. Mar. Biol. 34 (6): 411–4. doi:10.1134/S1063074008060102. S2CID 4681051.
- Shields, J. D. (1994). "The parasitic dinoflagellates of marine crustaceans". Annu. Rev. Fish Dis. 4: 241–271. doi:10.1016/0959-8030(94)90031-0.
- Shields, J. D.; Squyars, C. M. (2000). "Mortality and hematology of blue crabs, Callinectes sapidus, experimentally infected with the parasitic dinoflagellate Hematodinium perezi". Fish. Bull. 98 (1): 139–152.
- Small, H. J. (2012). "Advances in our understanding of the global diversity and distribution of Hematodinium spp. – Significant pathogens of commercially exploited crustaceans". J. Invertebr. Pathol. 110 (2): 234–246. doi:10.1016/j.jip.2012.03.012. PMID 22433998.
- Stentiford, G. D.; Green, M.; Bateman, K.; Small, H. J.; Neil, D. M.; Feist, S. W. (2002). "Infection by a Hematodinium-like parasitic dinoflagellate causes Pink Crab Disease (PCD) in the edible crab Cancer pagurus". J. Invertebr. Pathol. 79 (3): 179–191. doi:10.1016/S0022-2011(02)00028-9. PMID 12133707.
- Stentiford, G. D.; Shields, J. D. (2005). "A review of the parasitic dinoflagellates Hematodinium species and Hematodinium-like infections in marine crustaceans" (PDF). Dis. Aquat. Org. 66 (1): 47–70. doi:10.3354/dao066047. PMID 16175968.
- Wilhelm, G.; Boulo, V. (1988). "Infection de l'etrille Liocarcinus puber (L.) par un dinoflagellate parasite: Hematodinium sp". Cons. Int. Explor. Mer. Ser. 32: 1–10.
- Wilhelm, G.; Mialhe, E. (1996). "Dinoflagellate infection associated with the decline of Necora puber crab populations in France". Dis. Aquat. Org. 26: 213–9. doi:10.3354/dao026213.
- Xu, W. J.; Xie, J.; Shi, H.; Li, C. (2010). "Hematodinium infections in cultured ridgetail white prawns, Exopalaemon carinicauda, in eastern China". Aquaculture. 300 (1–4): 25–31. doi:10.1016/j.aquaculture.2009.12.024.
