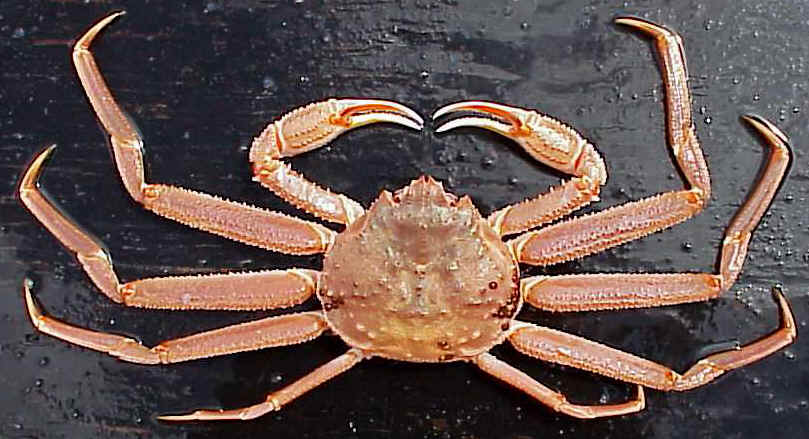
- Chionoecetes bairdi
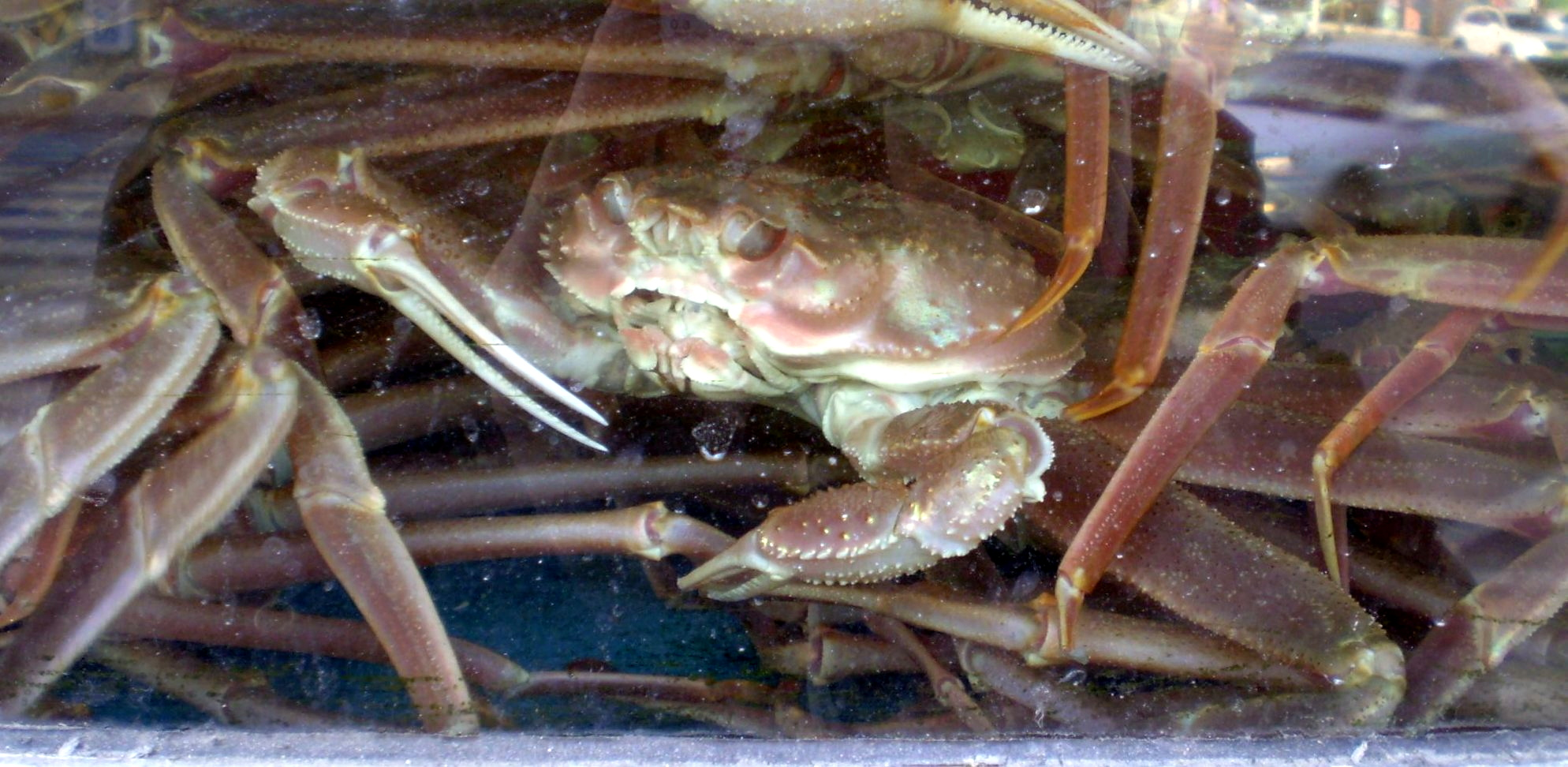
- Chionoecetes opilio

Scientific classification
- Kingdom: Animalia
- Phylum: Arthropoda
- Clade: Pancrustacea
- Class: Malacostraca
- Order: Decapoda
- Suborder: Pleocyemata
- Infraorder: Brachyura
- Family: Oregoniidae
- Genus: Chionoecetes; Krøyer, 1838

Species
- 7 species (see text)

= Chionoecetes =

Genus of crabs

Chionoecetes is a genus of crabs that live in the northern Pacific and Atlantic Oceans.

Common names for crabs in this genus include "queen crab" (in Canada) and "spider crab". The generic name Chionoecetes means snow (χιών, chion) inhabitant (οἰκητης, oiketes); opilio means shepherd, and C. opilio is the primary species referred to as snow crab. Marketing strategies employ snow crab for any species in the genus Chionoecetes. The name "snow crab" refers to their being commonly found in cold northern oceans.

== General ==
Snow crabs are caught as far north as the Arctic Ocean, from Newfoundland to Greenland and north of Norway in the Atlantic Ocean. They are caught across the Pacific Ocean, including the Sea of Japan, the Bering Sea, the Gulf of Alaska, Norton Sound, and as far south as California for Chionoecetes bairdi.

In 2019, the Norwegian Supreme Court ruled that the species is considered a sedentary species living on the seabed, and thus governed by the United Nations Law of the Sea.

== Species ==
Seven extant species are currently recognised in the genus:

- Chionoecetes angulatus Rathbun, 1924 – triangle tanner crab
- Chionoecetes bairdi Rathbun, 1924 – tanner crab, bairdi, or inshore tanner crab
- Chionoecetes elongatus Rathbun, 1924
- Chionoecetes japonicus Rathbun, 1932 – beni-zuwai crab
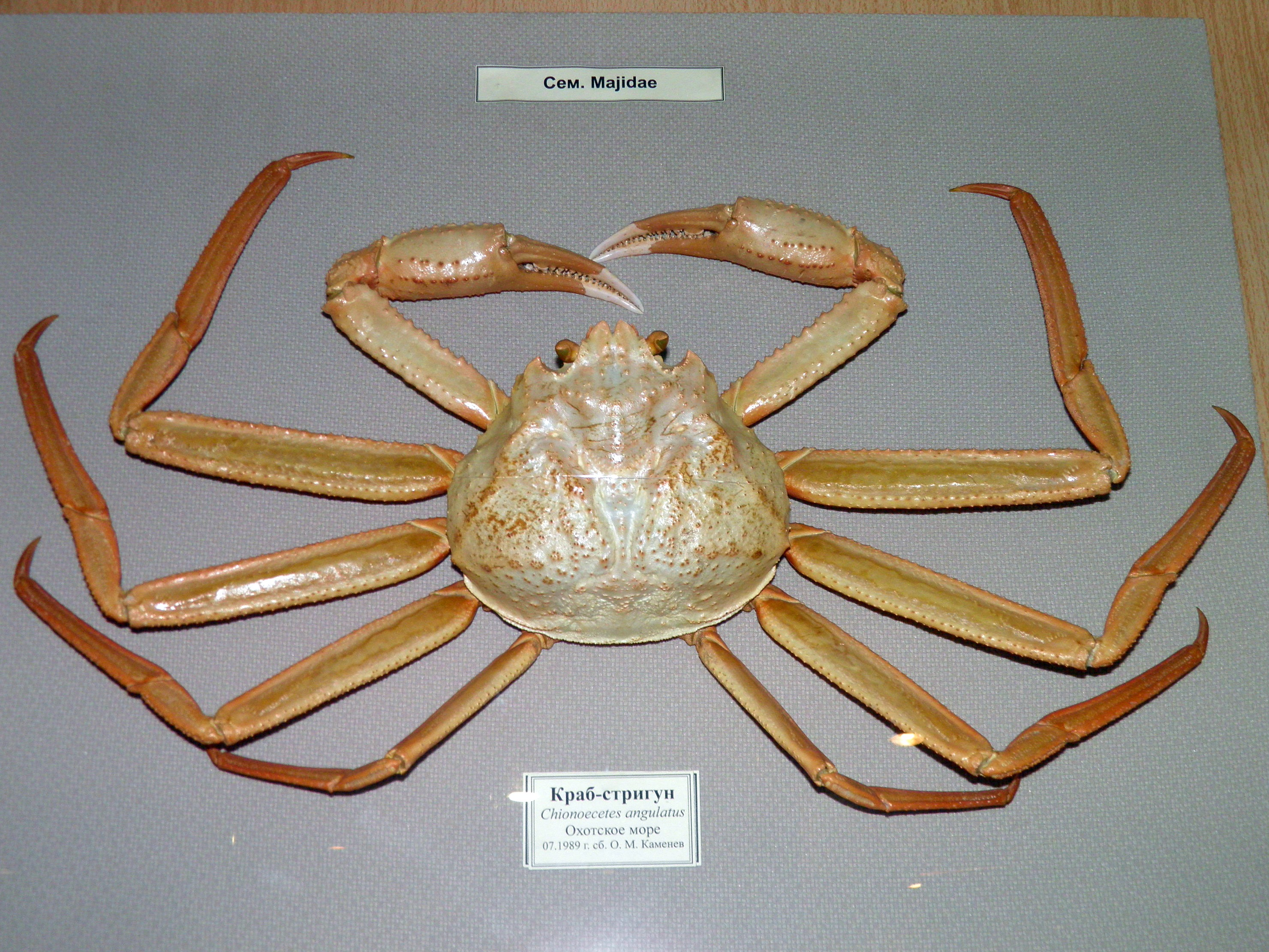
- Chionoecetes angulatus
  Chionoecetes opilio (Fabricius, 1788) – snow crab or opilio
- Chionoecetes pacificus Sakai, 1978
- Chionoecetes tanneri Rathbun, 1893 – grooved tanner crab

== Culinary use ==
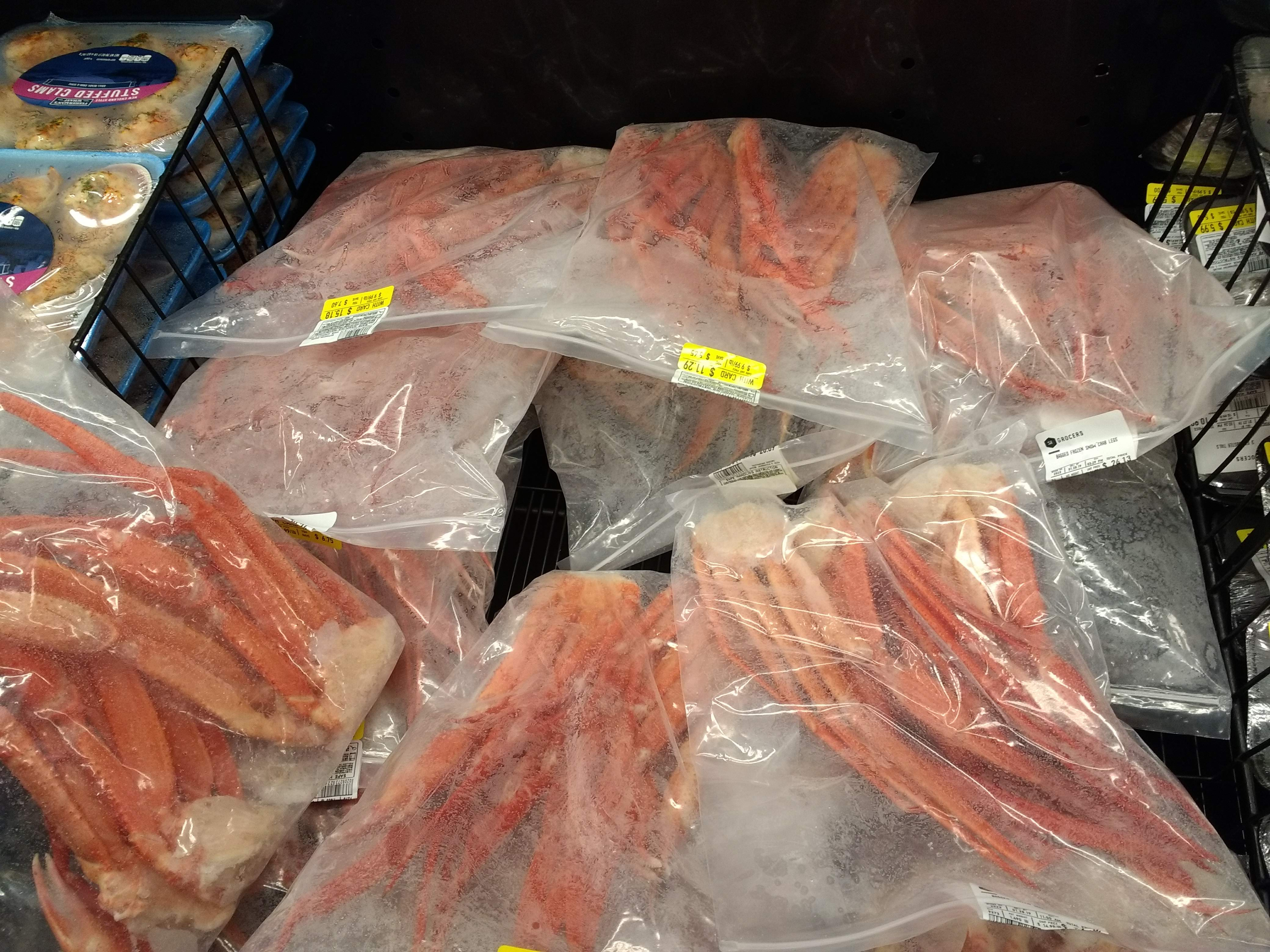
Bagged frozen snow crab legs for sale in a supermarket

Crabs are prepared and eaten as a dish in many different ways all over the world. The legs are usually served in clusters and are steamed, boiled, or grilled. Snow crab can be used as an ingredient in other dishes, such as snow crab macaroni and cheese.

== Food web position and importance ==
Snow crabs are an important part of the ecosystem throughout the Pacific and Atlantic Oceans. They eat other invertebrates on the benthic shelf like crustaceans, bivalves, brittle stars, polychaetes, phytobenthos, foraminiferans, annelid worms, and mollusks. They are eaten by halibut, cod, larger snow crabs, seals, squid, and Alaskan king crabs. Snow crabs are highly sought after for the commercial fishing industry.

== Life history stages and vulnerabilities ==
Juvenile snow crabs mature in cold-water pools on the ocean floor that are sustained by melting sea ice. If waters warm above the 2 °C maximum necessary for juvenile development, their normal nursery habitat will be reduced significantly. Adults are similarly unlikely to tolerate conditions of more than 5 °C. With a gestation period of up to two years and an average spawn size of up to 100,000 eggs, their fecundity (i.e., fertility) is high, but recent trends have shown that these characteristics do not make them impervious to threats like a warming climate.

== Population decline in the Bering Sea ==
2018 was one of the warmest years coinciding with periods of the lowest sea ice extent on record in the Bering Sea. The driver of this trend was the northeast Pacific marine heatwave, which contributed to significant die-offs in a number of species. 2019 was yet another year of record-breaking temperatures, attributed to a weakened North Pacific High, which reduced evaporative cooling in the Northeast Pacific and saw a steep decline in the number of juvenile crabs.

In 2021, crabs of all ages declined, and their habitat range shrank substantially. 2022 saw the most drastic decline in Bering Sea snow crab populations, decreasing from 11.7 billion in 2018 to 1.9 billion in 2022 (a decline of approximately 84%). This decimation of the crustaceans’ population spurred the closing of the Alaska snow crab season for the first time in history, an industry worth approximately $160,000,000 annually.

== Theories regarding decline ==
Though no single direct impact has been identified as a sole cause, several theories behind this decimation have been put forward. Overfishing is likely the main driver, intertwined with the effects of climate change. Increased water temperatures also increase snow crabs’ metabolism, so one theory is that their increased metabolic rate – combined with fewer resources due to a shrinking habitat – left them to either starve or consume each other.

Predator range expansion is another possibility. As waters warm, predators that normally inhabit warmer southern waters, such as the Pacific cod, can travel further north in search of prey. A third theory is that a reduction in habitat area could increase the spread of diseases like bitter crab syndrome. All these theories tie back to an altogether warmer ocean and are supported by the impacts of low ice delineated in Thoman et al. (2020).

== Bering Sea climatic impacts on snow crab ==
The Bering Sea's southeastern shelf is composed of 3 biophysical domains: 1) a vertically well-mixed upper region (0–50m); 2) a middle region that is well-mixed in winter and stratified in summer (50–100m); and 3) an outer region with more gradual stratification (100–200m). The Bering Sea shelf break (a zone where the shallower continental shelf drops off into the North Aleutians Basin) is the dominant driver of primary productivity in the Bering Sea – upwelling brings nutrients from the cold waters of the Aleutian basin to mix in shallow waters. This area is called home to many ecologically important species, including the snow crab.

To assess trends and impacts of the warming climate in the Bering Sea, a recent study created a regional model of both physical and biological elements of the Bering Sea using three global climate simulations from the Intergovernmental Panel on Climate Change Fourth Assessment. This model detected overall trends of warmer temperatures and a retreat of sea ice in the southeastern Bering Sea. Primary drivers of these higher water column temperatures include increasing air temperature and northward wind stress.

Warming trends on the outer Bering Sea shelf are concerning for a variety of reasons, one of which is that they may lead to decreased production of large crustacean zooplankton. On a broader spatial scale, sea surface temperatures (SSTs) that marked the start of summer in the North Pacific now come 11 days earlier and SSTs that marked the end of summer now come around 27 days later. Additionally, summers are on average 1.5 °C warmer and winters are on average 0.5 °C warmer.

Historically, the Bering Sea continental shelf maintains between 40–100% ice cover at its annual winter maximum. In 2018, the maximum sea ice cover was only 47% of the 1979–2016 mean seasonal maximum extent. Southeastward advection of melting sea ice contributes to the latitudinal salinity gradient of the Bering Sea, so when sea ice formation is reduced, the salinity gradient is altered. Though these don’t seem like significant changes, the inherent thermal conductivity of water (its ability to absorb heat) means that small changes like these are a big deal for marine organisms like the snow crab. It is yet unknown whether the Bering Sea snow crab population will recover, but scientists and policymakers will need to act quickly if improvement is to occur.
