= SFOS =

SFOS may refer to:

- Sailfish OS, the Linux MeeGo Sailfish Operating System
- School of Fisheries and Ocean Sciences
