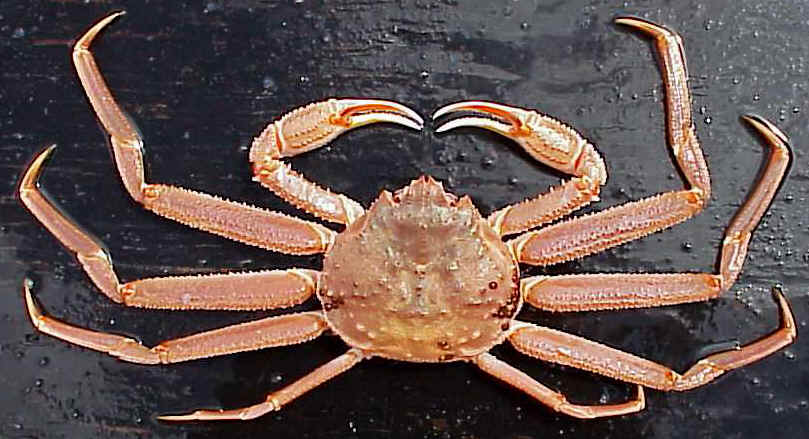

Scientific classification
- Kingdom: Animalia
- Phylum: Arthropoda
- Clade: Pancrustacea
- Class: Malacostraca
- Order: Decapoda
- Suborder: Pleocyemata
- Infraorder: Brachyura
- Family: Oregoniidae
- Genus: Chionoecetes
- Species: C. bairdi

Binomial name
- Chionoecetes bairdi M. J. Rathbun, 1924

= Chionoecetes bairdi =

Species of crab

Chionoecetes bairdi is a species of snow crab, alternatively known as bairdi crab and tanner crab. C. bairdi is closely related to Chionoecetes opilio, and it can be difficult to distinguish C. opilio from C. bairdi. Both species are found in the Bering Sea and are sold commercially under the name "snow crab." Tanner crabs have suffered from overfishing and as a result strict controls have been placed on tanner crab fisheries.

== Etymology ==
It was named by Mary Jane Rathbun, a Smithsonian employee who became one of the leading authorities on crab taxonomy. She named the crab for Spencer Baird, her mentor, who in the 1880s as Secretary of the Smithsonian Institution and head of the United States Fish Commission, had given her her first position.

== Biology ==
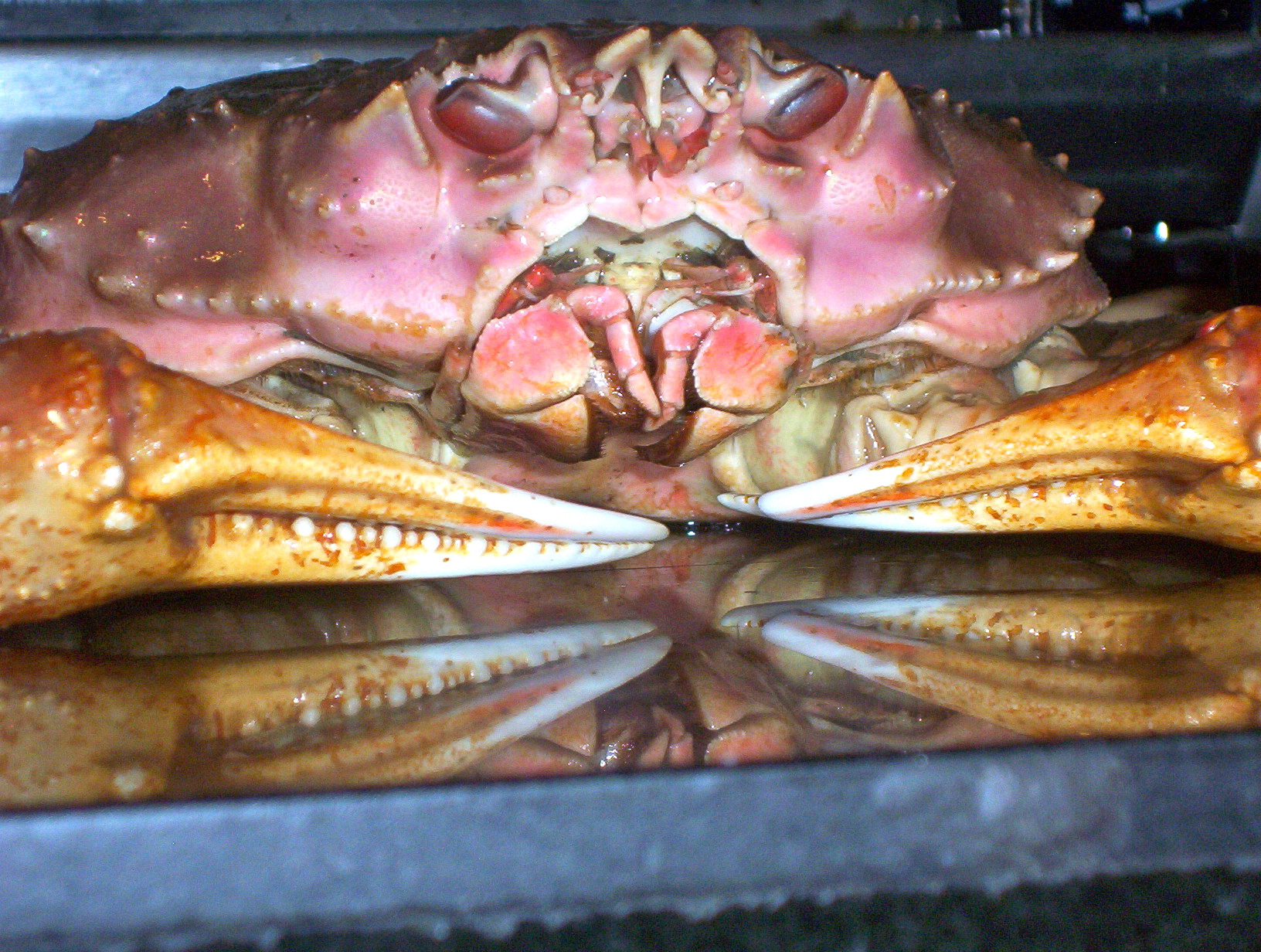
The mouthparts, other sensory organs, and pincers of an adult male

Tanner crabs are considered a short-tailed or "true" crab. They are decapods with pincer claws on their frontmost pair of legs. They can live over a decade. Most adults reach 1 to 4 pounds (0.45 to 1.81 kg) by the time they reach adulthood, usually after about five years. Females will incubate fertilized eggs for a full year before hatching during spring plankton blooming season.

The larvae are at first able to swim. They lose this ability and settle to the bottom after about two months. The tanners' diet consist mostly of other ocean bottom crustaceans, clams and worms. Bottomfish and humans are their main predators. Little is known about their social structure except that the sexes remain mostly separate except during mating season. Tanner crabs are vulnerable to bitter crab disease.

== Fisheries ==
Tanners are normally caught through the use of crab pots similar to those used to catch the larger King crab. The Bering Sea fishery for tanners opened in 1961 and soon became a major fishery in the North Pacific, with record catches as high as 332,000,000 pounds (151,000,000 kg).

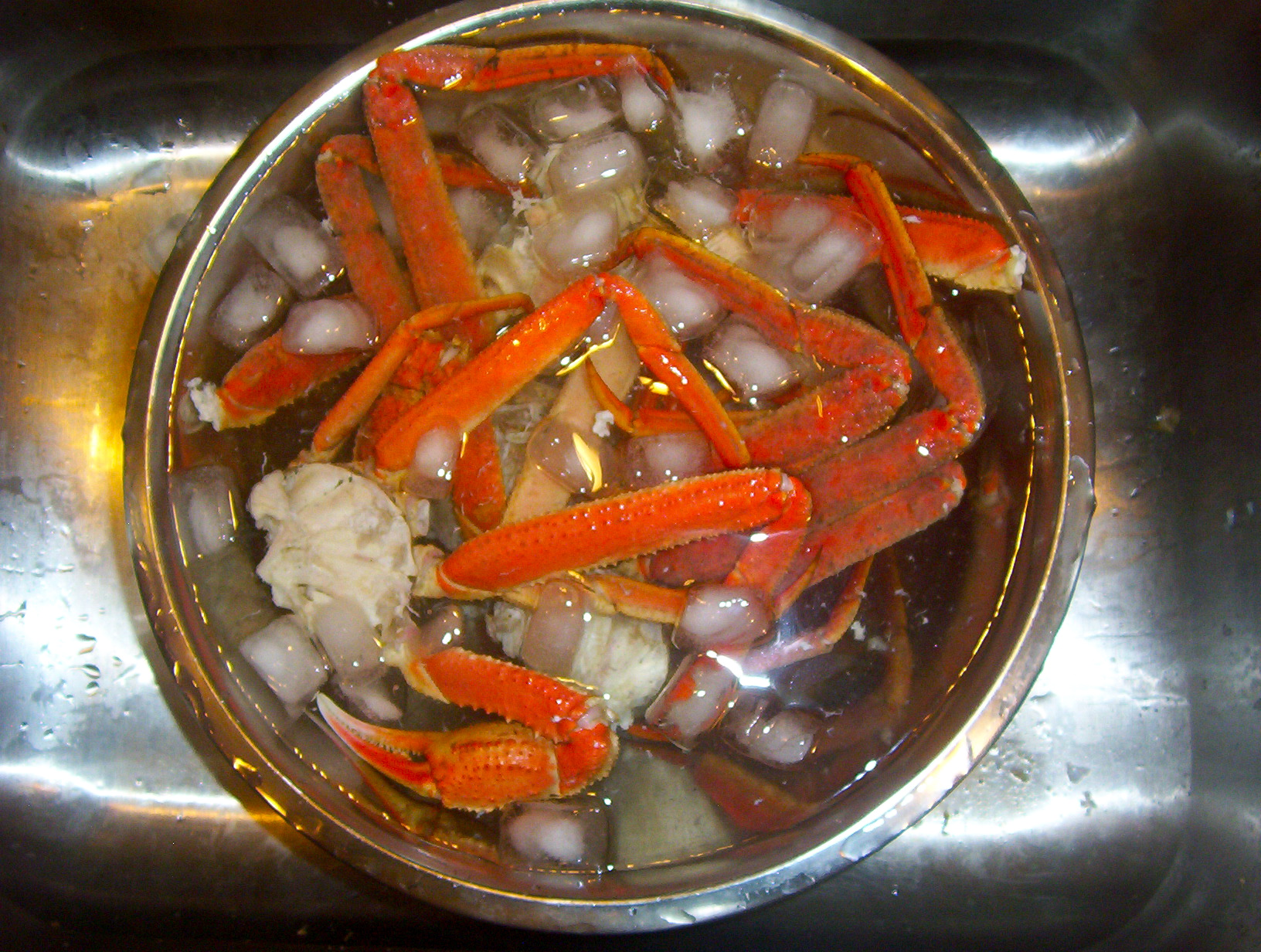
New fisheries regulations limit the catch and ensure that a portion of crab be available to local Alaskan communities

Before the passage of the Magnuson Fishery Conservation and Management Act of 1976 much of the Bering Sea tanner crab was caught by Japanese and Soviet fishing vessels. Due to the massive harvests, numbers declined sharply, with only 1,200,000 pounds (540,000 kg) harvested in 1984. Sensing the danger of overfishing tanner crab to the point of extinction, legislators and fisheries managers closed tanner crab fishing entirely in 1986 and 1987. Policy adjustments were made to limit the catch, but the fishery was closed again in 1997 due to a very poor harvest in 1996.

In the mid-2000s fisheries managers introduced a "Crab Rationalization Program" based on similar programs in the North Atlantic and New Zealand. The program introduced individual fishing quotas based on each crab fishing boat's previous catches and a requirement that a percentage of the catch be offered for sale in the regions where it was caught.

This program was popular with environmental and conservation groups, although some small-scale crab fisherman complained that it placed them at a disadvantage as they could never catch more than their allotted share even if there were more crab available. In addition to overfishing, researchers from the School of Fisheries and Ocean Sciences have hypothesized that prevailing winds may affect crab population numbers from one year to the next.
