= RV Sikuliaq =

American research vessel

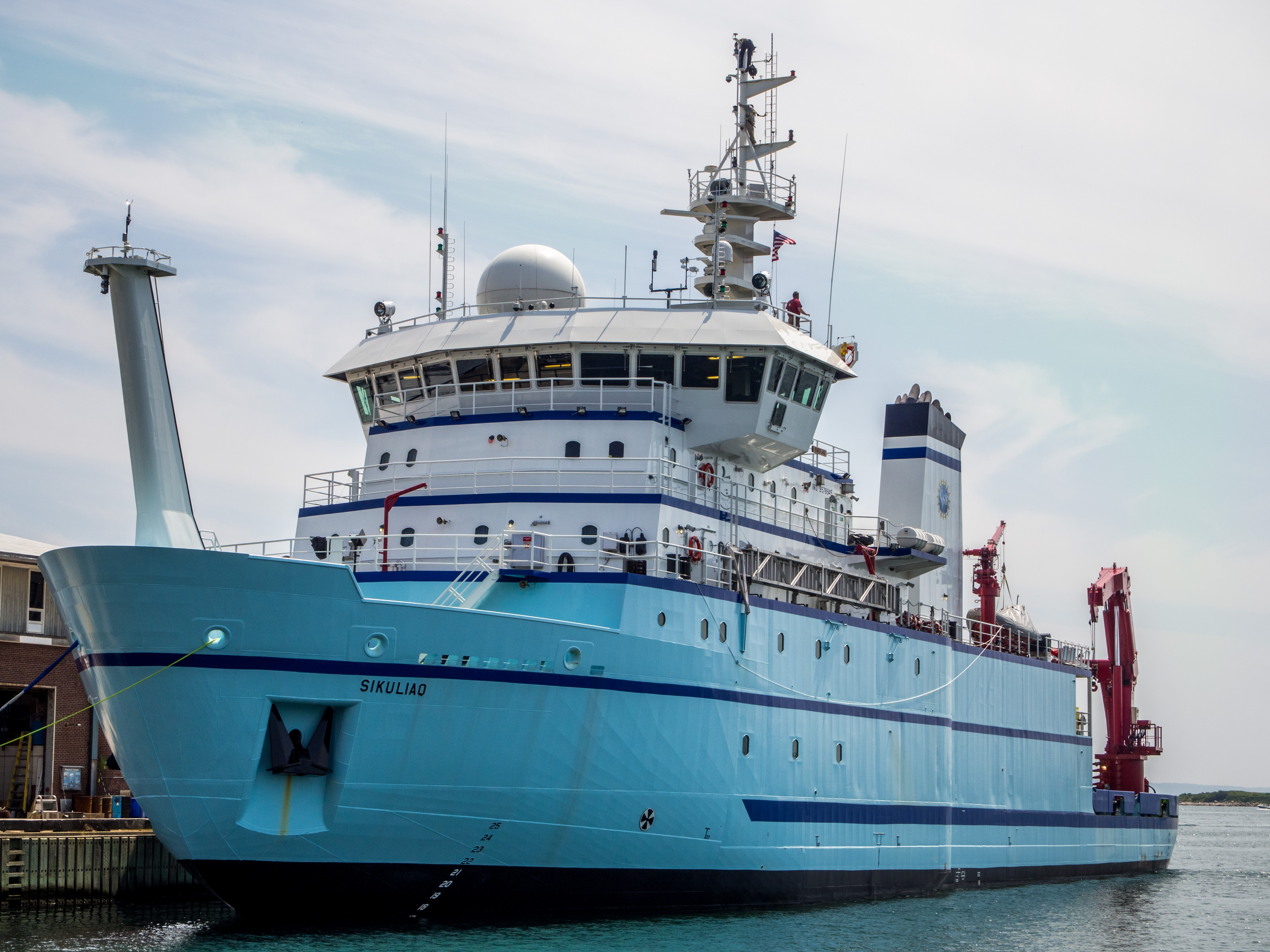
- Sikuliaq at Woods Hole, Massachusetts, in August 2014. Since then, the vessel has been painted in a different livery.

History

United States
- Name: Sikuliaq
- Namesake: Iñupiaq for "young sea ice"
- Owner: National Science Foundation
- Operator: University of Alaska Fairbanks College of Fisheries and Ocean Sciences
- Port of registry: Seward, Alaska
- Ordered: 5 February 2010
- Builder: Marinette Marine Corporation, Marinette, Wisconsin
- Cost: US$200 million (2010) (equivalent to US$280 million in 2024)
- Yard number: 650
- Laid down: 11 April 2011
- Launched: 13 October 2012
- Completed: 6 June 2014
- Identification: IMO Number: 9578945; Call Sign: WDN7246; MMSI Number: 303364000
- Status: In service

General characteristics
- Type: Research vessel
- Tonnage: 3,429 GT; 1,028 NT; 1,556 DWT
- Displacement: 3,665 long tons (3,724 t)
- Length: 79.6 m (261 ft)
- Beam: 15.85 m (52 ft)
- Draft: 5.715 m (19 ft)
- Depth: 8.5 m (28 ft)
- Ice class: Polar Class 5
- Installed power: 2 × MTU 16V-4000 (2 × 1,750 kW); 2 × MTU 12V-4000 (2 × 1,310 kW)
- Propulsion: Diesel-electric; two Wärtsilä Icepod 2500 azimuth thrusters
- Speed: 14.2 knots (26.3 km/h; 16.3 mph); 2 knots (3.7 km/h; 2.3 mph) in 2.5 feet (0.76 m) ice
- Range: 18,000 nautical miles (33,000 km; 21,000 mi) at 10 knots (19 km/h; 12 mph)
- Endurance: 45 days
- Capacity: 24 science berths; 2–4 20-feet science vans
- Crew: 20 (+2)

RV Sikuliaq is an American research vessel owned by the National Science Foundation and operated by the University of Alaska Fairbanks College of Fisheries and Ocean Sciences. Built in 2014 by Marinette Marine Corporation in Marinette, Wisconsin, the $200 million vessel replaced the 1966-built research vessel Alpha Helix that was retired in 2007. Sikuliaq, named after the Iñupiaq word for "young sea ice" and pronounced "see-KOO-lee-auk", is homeported in Seward, Alaska.

== Construction ==
The original science mission requirement of the new research vessel was prepared by a committee of the UNOLS Fleet Improvement Committee in 1998. In 2001, Congress appropriated $1 million for a design study of a suitable vessel. The vessel, called Alaska Region Research Vessel (ARRV), was designed by naval architecture and marine engineering firm Glosten in 2004.

In May 2009, the National Science Foundation announced that it had received funding for the construction of an ice-capable research vessel designed to support scientific research in high-latitude waters. In December 2009, the $123 million contract for the construction of the $200 million vessel was awarded to Marinette Marine Corporation of Marinette, Wisconsin, and the ceremonial signing of the contract was held on 5 February 2010. In January 2010, the University of Alaska Fairbanks chose an Alaska Native name Sikuliaq, meaning "young sea ice" in the Iñupiaq language, after receiving more than 150 suggestions.

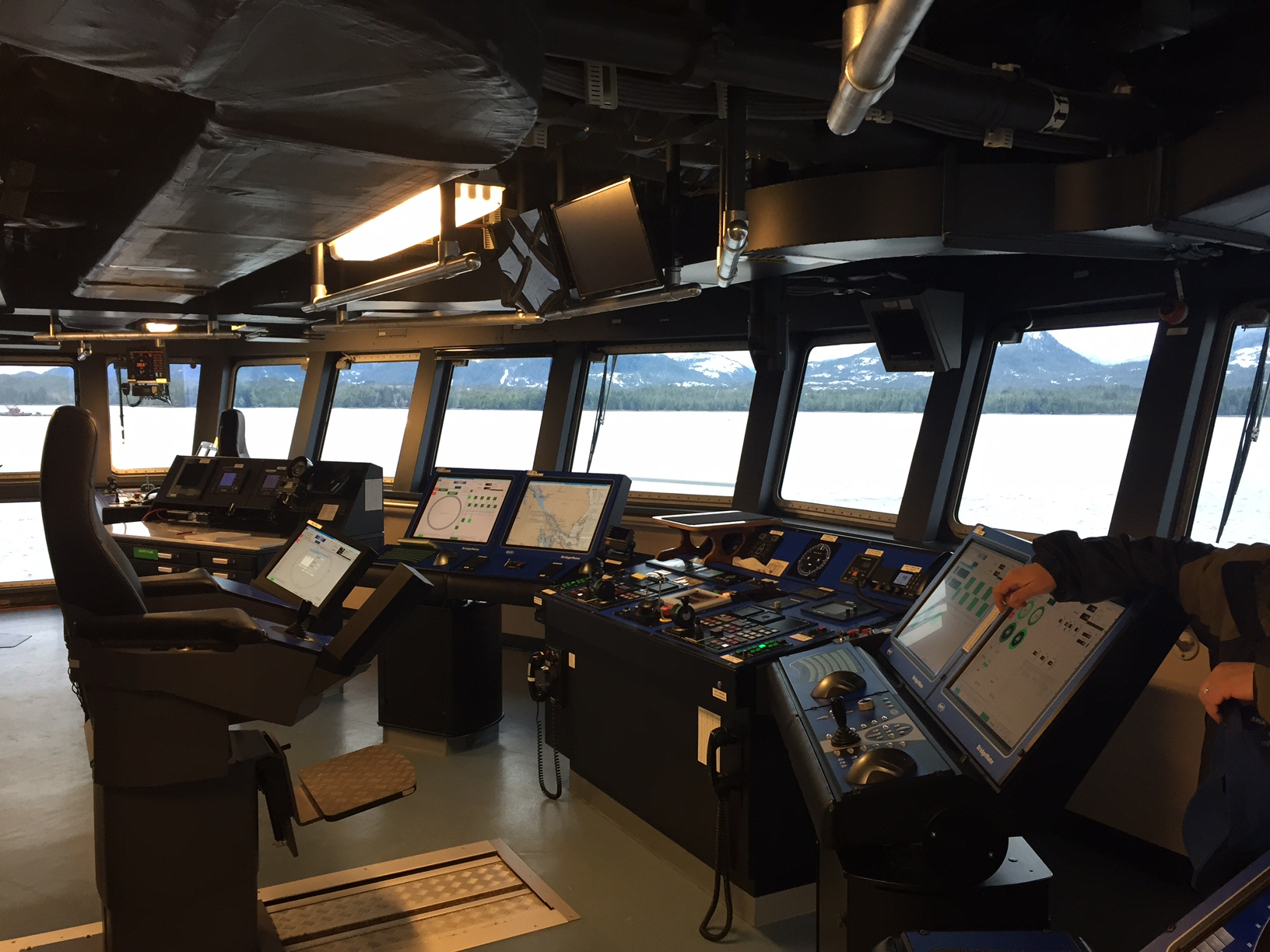
The bridge of the Sikuliaq.

The keel of the vessel was laid down on 11 April 2011 and she was launched on 13 October 2012. Although Sikuliaq was initially expected to arrive in her homeport of Seward, Alaska, in January 2014, her delivery was delayed due to technical problems and she spent her first winter in the Great Lakes. Sikuliaq was finally handed over to the National Science Foundation on 6 June 2014. During the summer of 2014, she passed through the Panama Canal and began science operations in the equatorial Pacific and along the US west coast in the autumn. She then headed to Alaska, where the vessel arrived in February 2015, making a port visit in Ketchikan. She was officially commissioned in March 2015 at her home port of Seward.

== Description ==
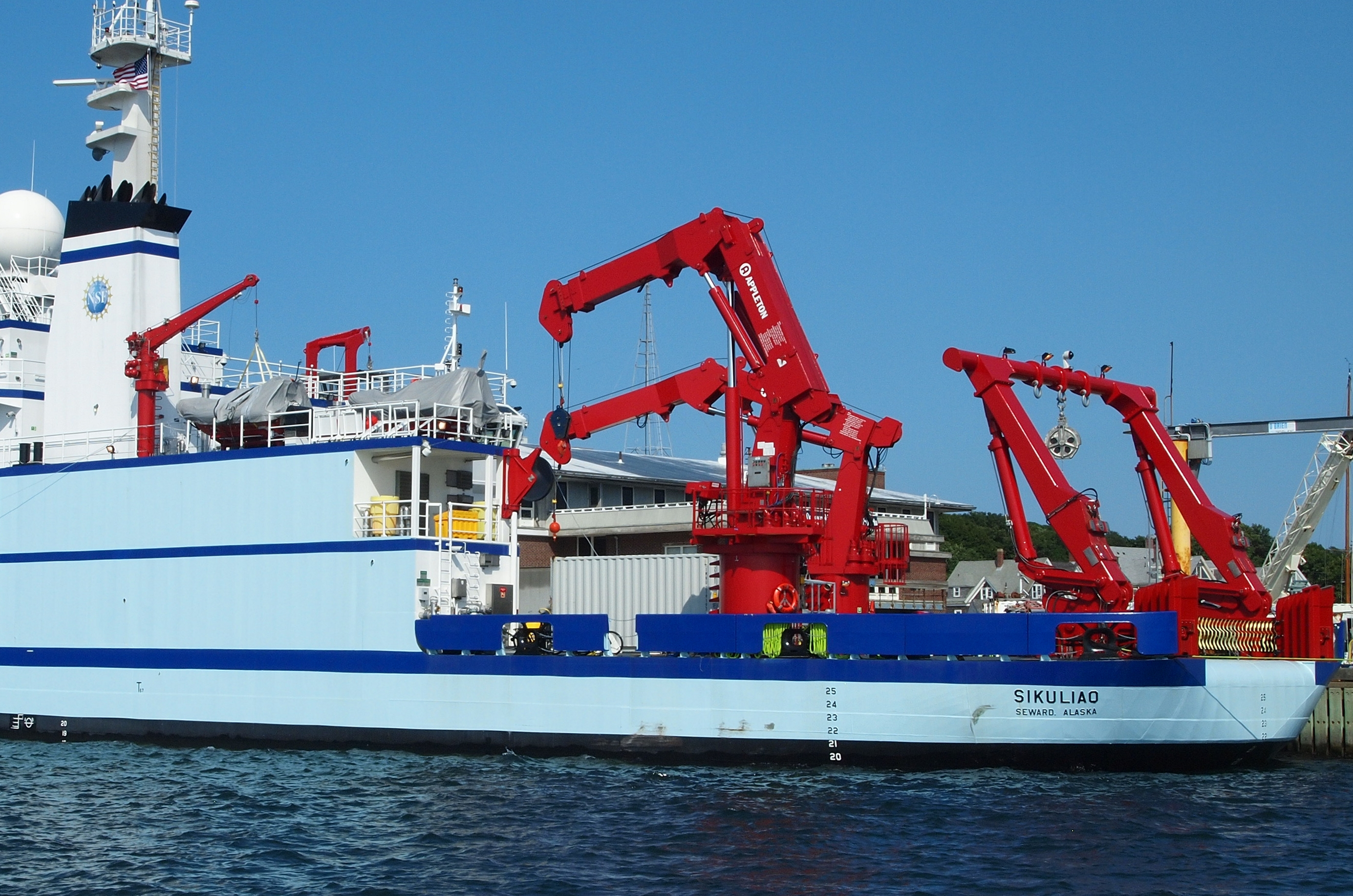
Aft Deck of RV Sikuliaq

=== Mission and capabilities ===
Sikuliaq has accommodations for up to 24 scientists and students per cruise, including those with disabilities, to conduct multidisciplinary studies and to facilitate broadband real-time virtual participation of classroom students in expeditions, including remotely operated underwater vehicles. Sikuliaq supports the collection of sediment samples from the seafloor, remotely operated vehicles, the use of a flexible suite of winches to raise and lower scientific equipment, and surveys throughout the water column and sea bottom using an extensive set of research instrumentation. The vessel is designed to have the lowest possible environmental impact, including a low underwater radiated noise signature for marine mammal and fisheries work.

One of the most advanced research vessels ever built, Sikuliaq has extensive scientific facilities. In addition to 2,100 square feet (200 m^{2}) of built-in laboratories, she can accommodate four 20-foot scientific containers on the 4,360-square-foot (405 m^{2}) aft deck. In addition, Sikuliaq is fitted with flexible over-side handling equipment such as an A-frame in the stern as well as a number of science winches and cranes on the aft deck. She also has a retractable transducer centerboard (drop keel) for deploying various sensors under the vessel.

=== Technical details ===
Sikuliaq is 261 feet (80 m) on and has a maximum beam of 52 feet (16 m). At a displacement of 3,665 long tons (3,724 t), she draws 18 feet 9 inches (5.715 m) of water. Designed for operations in ice-infested waters, the vessel has a sloping icebreaker bow and a hull that is two feet wider at the bow than in the stern to reduce ice resistance. She is served by a crew of 20 plus two marine technicians.

Sikuliaq has a diesel-electric powertrain in which the main diesel generators produce power for electric motors coupled to the propellers. She is powered by two 1,800 kW (2,400 hp) 16-cylinder and two 1,310 kW (1,760 hp) 12-cylinder MTU 4000 series high speed diesel engines. Sikuliaq is one of the first vessels ever to be fitted with Icepod propulsion units, Wärtsilä's brand of ice-strengthened azimuth thrusters that can be rotated 360 degrees about the vertical axis. The Z-drive thrusters are "pulling", meaning that the propellers are facing to the direction the vessel is moving to improve the hydrodynamic efficiency. In addition, they are "can-mounted", meaning that the thrusters can be disconnected and lifted off for maintenance without docking the vessel. She is also fitted with a bow thruster to assist maneuvering at low speeds.

The maximum speed of Sikuliaq in calm water is 14.2 knots (26.3 km/h; 16.3 mph). In addition, she can break first-year sea ice up to 2.5 feet (0.76 m) thick at a constant speed of 2 knots (3.7 km/h; 2.3 mph) — which inspired her name. She also has dynamic positioning capability. Sikuliaq has an operational endurance of 45 days and can sail 18,000 nautical miles (33,000 km; 21,000 mi) at 10 knots (19 km/h; 12 mph).
