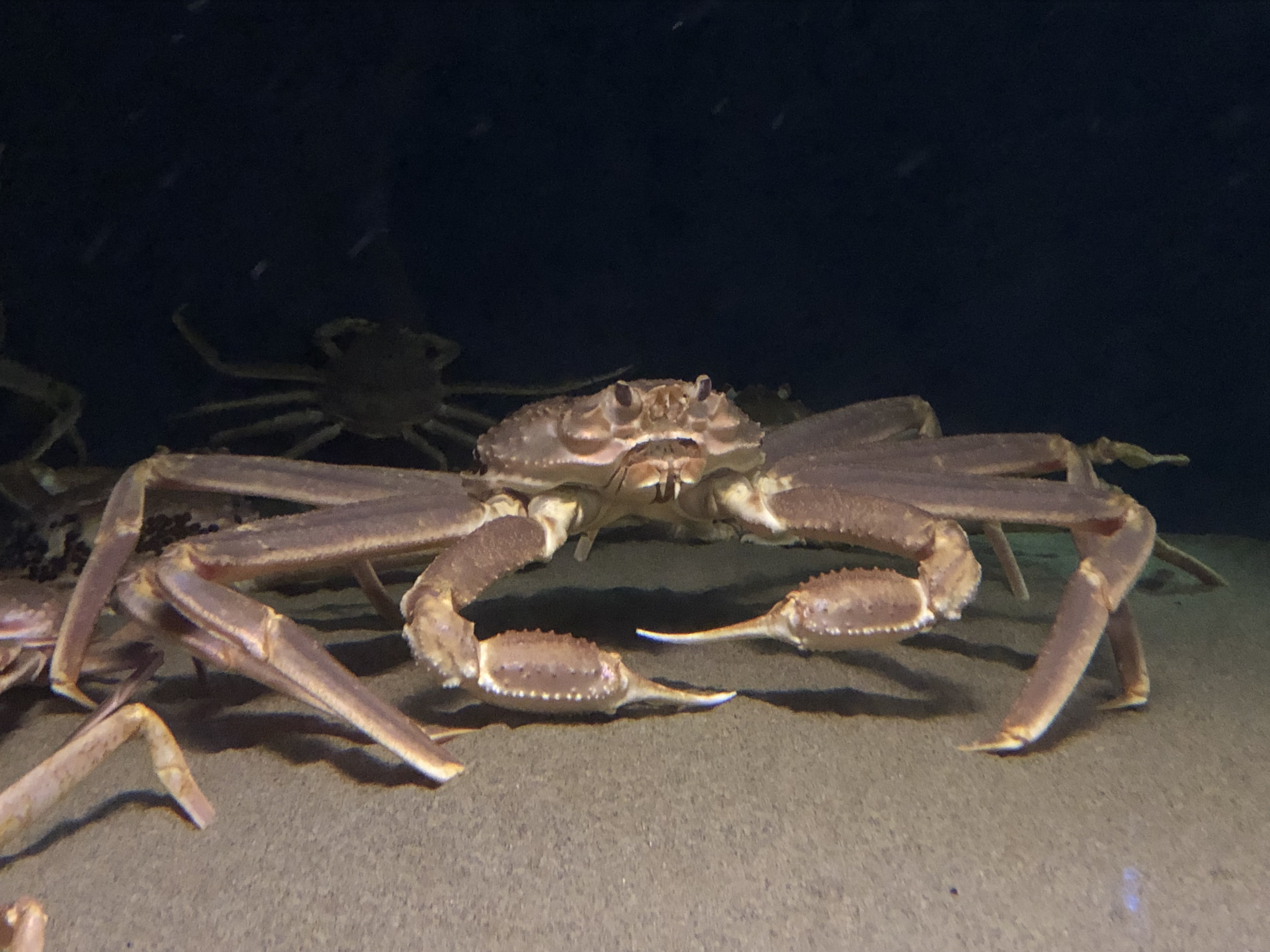

Scientific classification
- Kingdom: Animalia
- Phylum: Arthropoda
- Clade: Pancrustacea
- Class: Malacostraca
- Order: Decapoda
- Suborder: Pleocyemata
- Infraorder: Brachyura
- Family: Oregoniidae
- Genus: Chionoecetes
- Species: C. opilio

Binomial name
- Chionoecetes opilio (O. Fabricius, 1788)

Synonyms
- Cancer phalangium O. Fabricius, 1780 non J. C. Fabricius, 1775: preoccupied; Cancer opilio O. Fabricius, 1788; Chionoecetes behringianus Stimpson, 1857; Chionoecetes chilensis Streets, 1870; Peloplastus pallasi Gerstaecker, 1856

= Chionoecetes opilio =

Opilio crab

Species of crab

Chionoecetes opilio, a species of snow crab, also known as opilio crab or opies, is a predominantly epifaunal crustacean native to shelf depths in the northwest Atlantic Ocean and north Pacific Ocean. It is a well-known commercial species of Chionoecetes, often caught with traps or by trawling. Seven species are in the genus Chionoecetes, all of which bear the name "snow crab". C. opilio is related to C. bairdi, commonly known as the tanner crab, and other crab species found in the cold, northern oceans.

== Taxonomy ==
The species was first described by Otto Fabricius in 1780, under the name Cancer phalangium, a name that was invalid due to Johan Christian Fabricius having used it previously for the species now known as Inachus phalangium. The first valid scientific name was provided by Otto Fabricius in 1788, when he redescribed the species as Cancer opilio. The type locality is Greenland.

As the genus Cancer was divided up, the species C. opilio was transferred to a new genus, Chionoecetes by Henrik Nikolai Krøyer in 1838. C. opilio was the only species in the genus at first, so it is the type species.

Mary J. Rathbun described a subspecies, C. o. elongatus, in 1924. This is now generally recognised as a full species, Chionoecetes elongatus.

== Anatomy ==
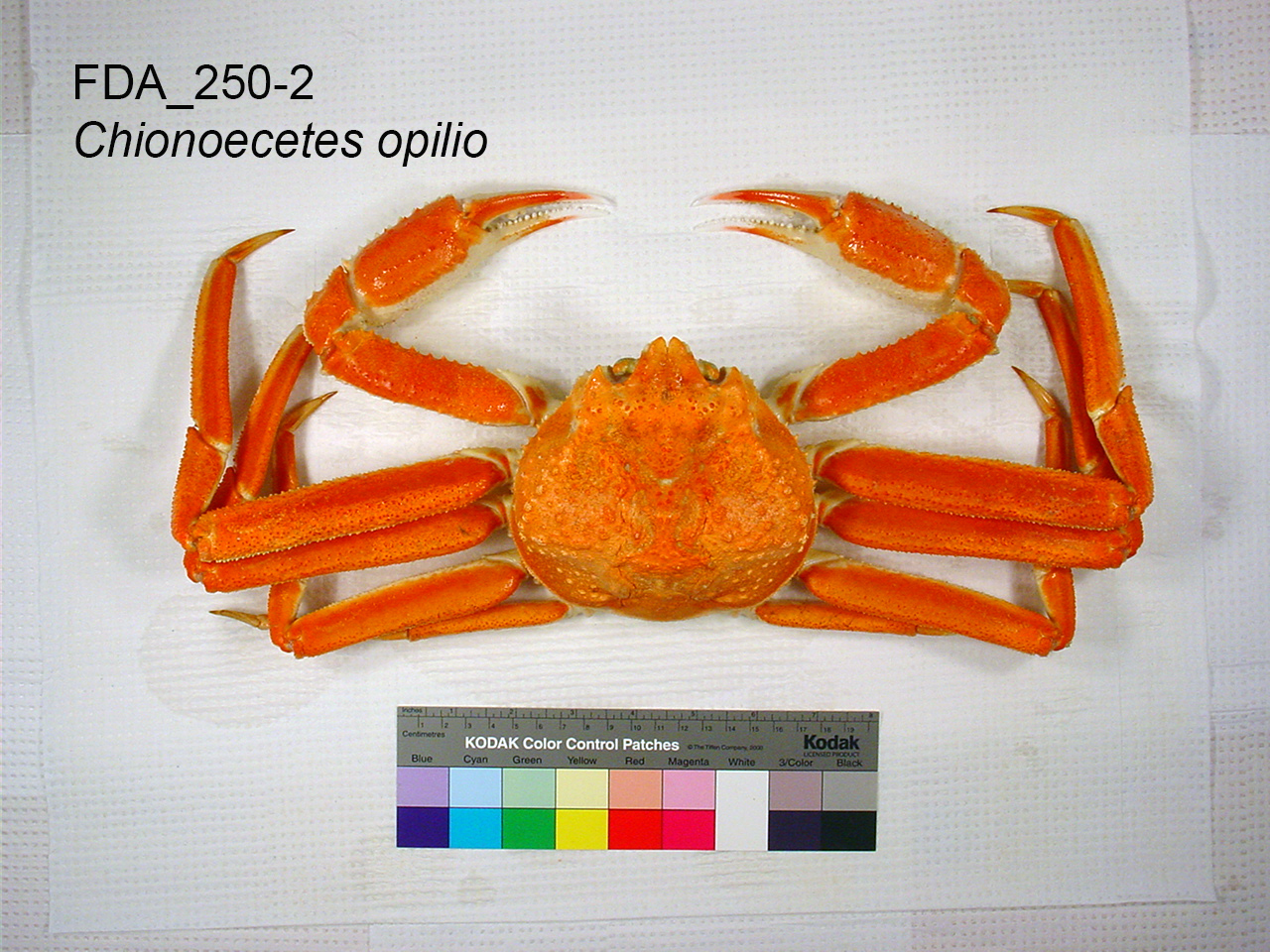
FDA standard reference photo

Snow crabs have equally long and wide carapaces, or protective shell-coverings, over their bodies. Their tubercles, or the bodily projections on their shells, are moderately enclosed in calcium deposits, and they boast hooked setae, which are rigid, yet springy, hair-like organs on their claws. Snow crabs have a horizontal rostrum at the front of the carapace; the rostrum is basically just an extension of the hard, shell covering of the carapace and it boasts two flat horns separated by a gap. They have triangular spines and well-defined gastric and branchial regions internally. Snow crabs also have little granules along the border of their bodies, except their intestinal region. Concerning their walking legs, their first three are compressed; their chelipeds, or pincers, are usually smaller, shorter, or equal to their walking legs. Snow crabs are iridescent and range in color from brown to light red on top and from yellow to white on the bottom, and are bright white on the sides of their feet.

== Distribution and habitat ==
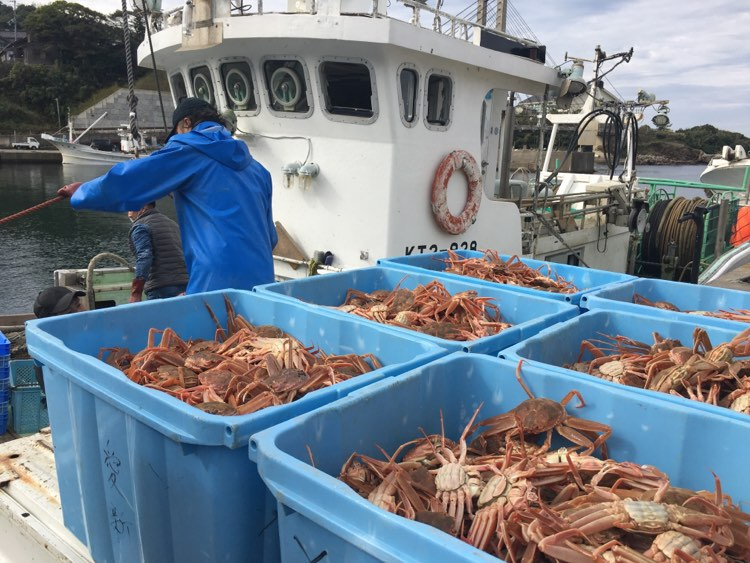
Female crabs caught in Taiza Fishing Port off the coast of Kyoto, Japan

Snow crabs are native to the Northwest Atlantic and the North Pacific. In the Northwest Atlantic, they are found in the areas near Greenland, Newfoundland, in the Gulf of St. Lawrence, and on the Scotian Shelf. In the North Pacific, this crab is found in areas ranging from Alaska to northern Siberia, and through the Bering Strait to the Aleutian Islands, Japan, and Korea.

In 1996, they were recorded in the Barents Sea for the first time. They are considered an invasive species there, but how they arrived there is unclear. Another commercially important species, introduced deliberately to the same region, the red king crab, already has established itself in Barents Sea. Similarly, snow crabs likely will have an adverse effect on the native species of the Barents Sea.

Snow crabs are found in the ocean's shelf and upper slope, on sandy and muddy bottoms. They are found at depths from 13 to 2,187 m (43 to 7,175 ft), but average is about 110 m (360 ft). In Atlantic waters, most snow crabs are found at depths of 70–280 m (230–920 ft). Where male and female snow crabs are found in the ocean, depths may vary. Small adult and senescent adult males occur mainly at intermediate depths over much of the year, while large and hardy adult males are found mostly at depths greater than 80 m (260 ft). Adult females are gregarious and congregate at depths of 60–120 m (200–390 ft). Snow crabs mainly reside in very cold waters, between −1 and 5 °C (30 and 41 °F), but can be found at temperatures up to 10 °C (50 °F).

== Diet ==
Chionoecetes opilio crabs eat other invertebrates in the benthic shelf, such as crustaceans, bivalves, brittle stars, polychaetes, and even phytobenthos and foraminiferans. Snow crabs also are scavengers, and aside from preying on other benthic shelf invertebrates, they prey on annelid worms and mollusks. Males typically prove to be better predators than mature females, and prey type depends upon predator size, with the smallest crabs feeding mainly on amphipods and ophiuroids, while the largest crabs feed mainly on annelids, crustacean decapods, and fish. Cannibalism is practised at times among snow crabs, most frequently by intermediate-sized females.

== Size and population structure ==
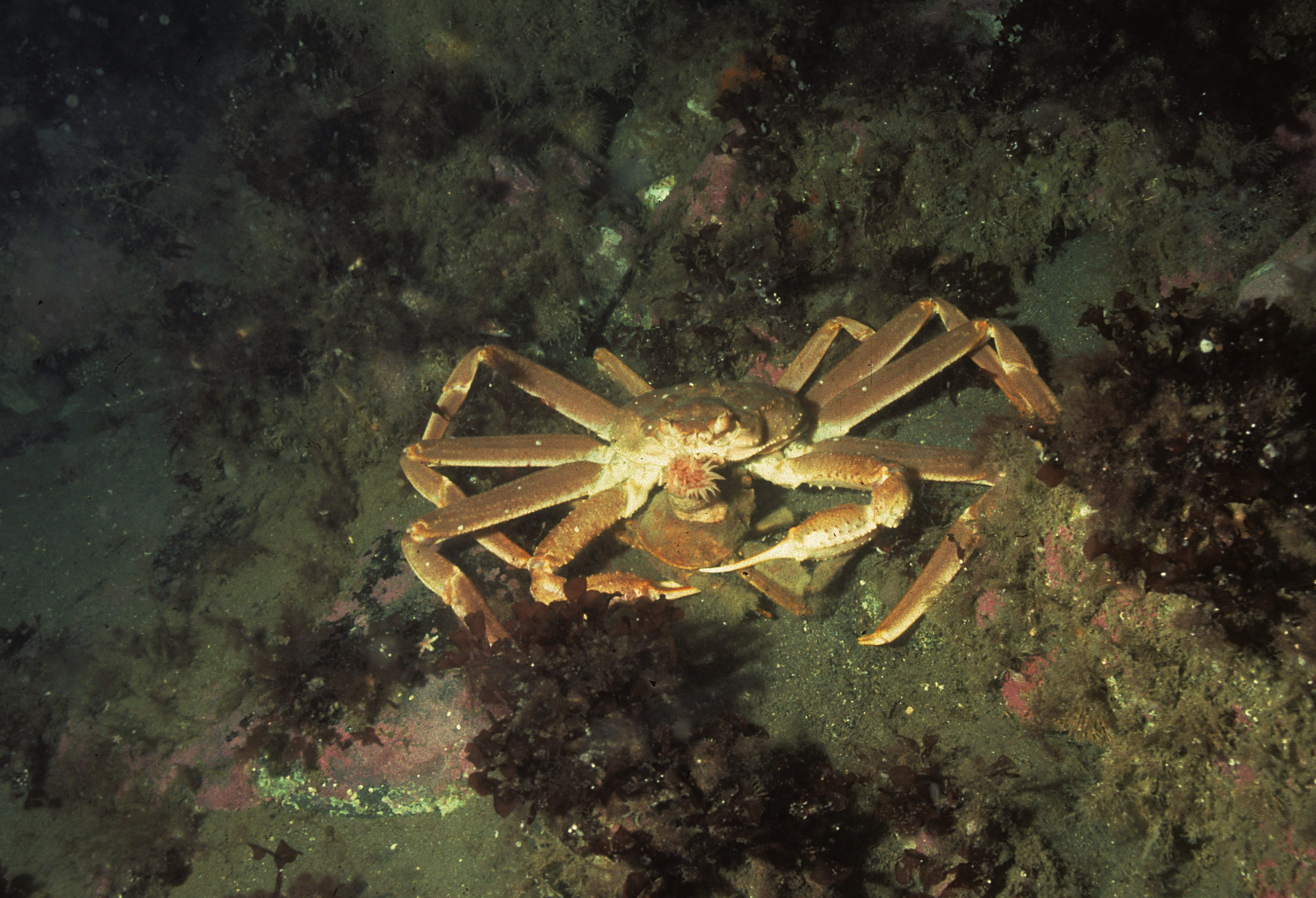
Two snow crabs with the larger male perched on top of the female, Bonne Bay, Newfoundland, Canada

The snow crab grows slowly and is structured according to its size. At least 11 stages of growth for male crabs are recognized. Usually, the male crabs are almost twice the size of the female crabs. Males can grow up to 16.5 cm (6.5 in) in carapace width, while females can grow up to 9.5 cm (3.7 in). Male carapaces are usually about 7 cm (2.8 in) in width and length, with the female carapace usually close to 5.5 cm (2.2 in) in width and length. Males caught in commercial fisheries generally weigh 0.5–1.35 kg (1.1–3.0 lb) and females generally about 0.5 kg (1.1 lb).

Off the coast of Newfoundland, two amphipod species – Ischyrocerus commensalis and Gammaropsis inaequistylis – have been found to live on the carapace of the snow crab.

== Breeding patterns ==
Snow crabs have a very high reproductive potential; each year, every female carries eggs. Females are fertilised internally and can carry up to 150,000 eggs under their abdomens after mating. Females usually lay their eggs in very deep areas of the ocean, such as in deposits of phytodetritus. Males also are capable of mating at both immature and mature stages of their lives.

Snow crabs have an average lifespan of 14 to 16 years. Before their deaths, they usually moult, mate a final time, and die. New snow crab offspring hatch along with the late spring phytoplankton bloom, so they have an ample food source to take advantage of upon hatching. When they hatch, they are in the zoeal stage, meaning that they are developing into larvae that can swim on their own. Then, they metamorphose into the megalopa stage and settle to the ocean floor among the phytodetritus.

== Commercial importance ==
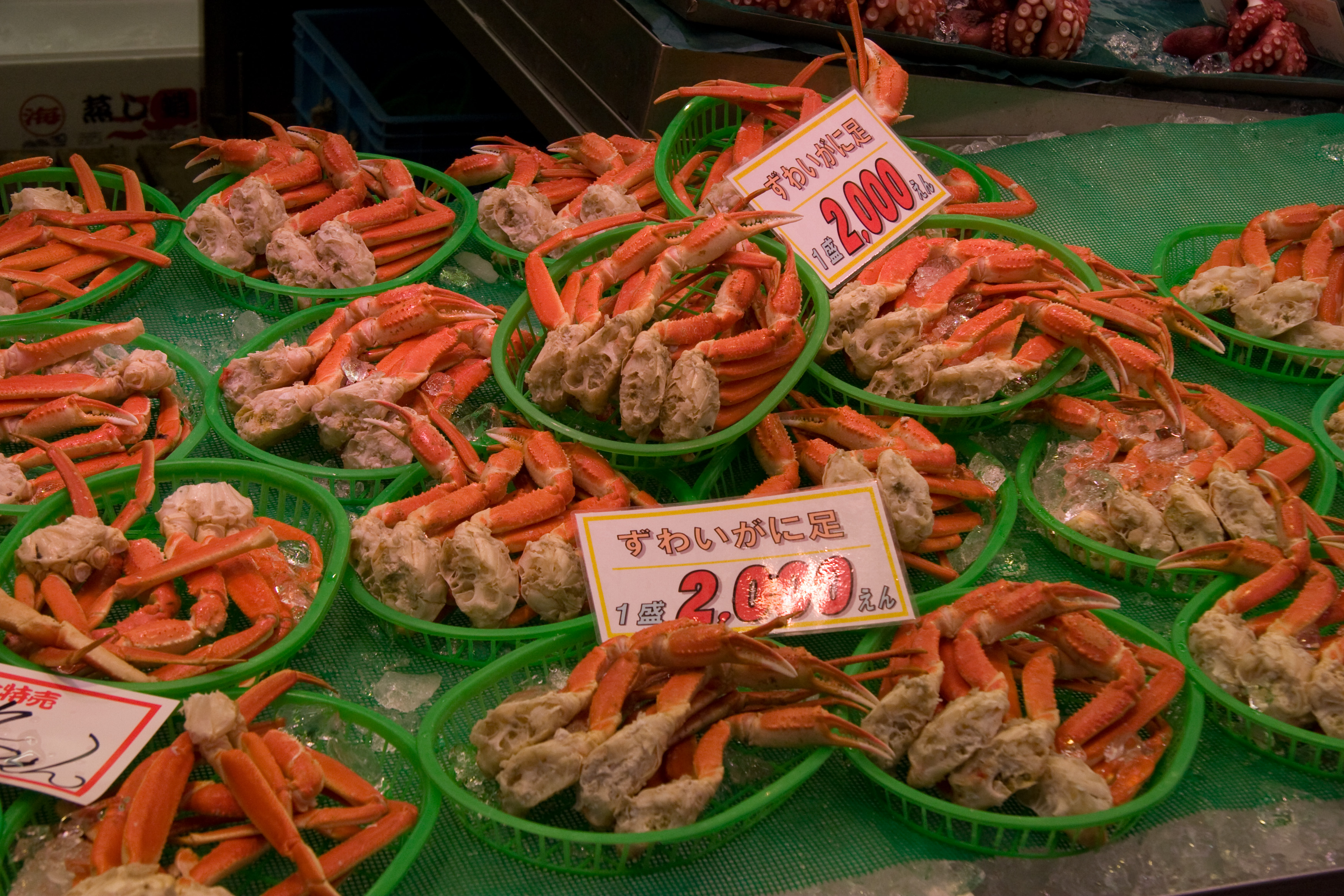
Crab legs sold in Kanazawa, Japan

This species of crab was commonly caught by trappers in the 1980s, but trapping has decreased since then. Much of the trapping has been in Canada for commercial use. The first commercial fishing for the species in the Barents Sea (where it is an invasive species) began in 2013, and the stock of this region likely will reach levels similar to eastern Canada in the future.

Since 2016, the snow crab is at the center of a dispute over fishing rights between Norway and the EU. The EU is of the view that the crab can be freely caught by EU fishers in the international waters in the Barents Sea. Norway, for its part, argues that the crab is not a fish but a sedentary species, and therefore subject to the jurisdiction Norway exercises over the continental shelf. The Norwegian Supreme Court adopted this view in a 2019 decision.

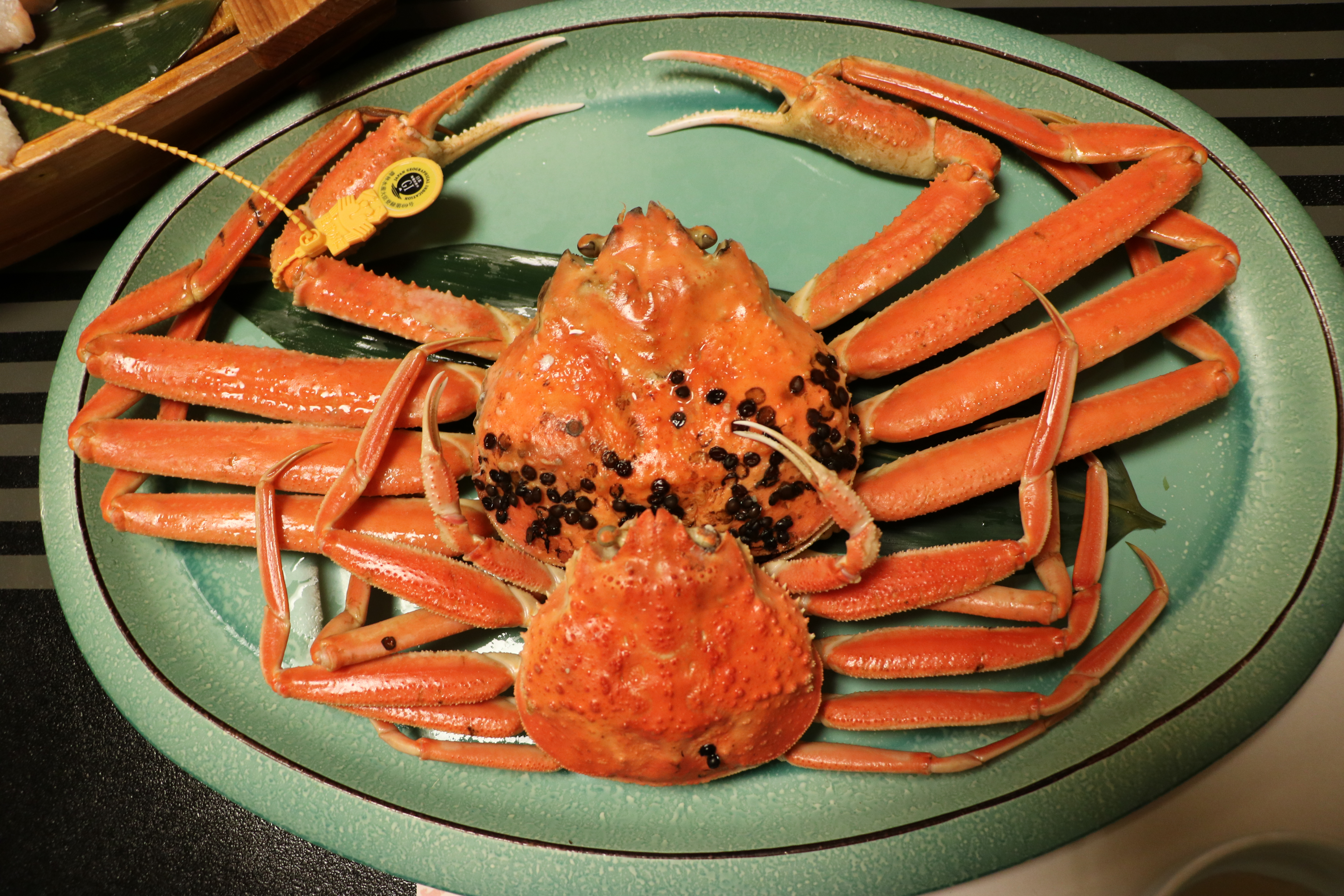
Boiled snow crab from Echizen, Japan

In 2022, the Alaska Department of Fish and Game (ADF&G) banned commercial fishing of snow crabs in the Bering Sea for the first time for the 2022/23 season. The reason for this was the sharp decline in the population. It shrank from about eight billion in 2018 to one billion animals in 2021. The causes are overfishing as well as increased water temperatures as a result of climate change. Cancellation of the crab fishery has significant implications for fishermen, industry, and communities.

In South Korea, the snow crab is an important commercial seafood being celebrated in snow crab markets, restaurants, and public art, including giant snow crabs climbing up buildings. The Yeongdeok Crab Village (영덕대게마을), which has existed since the Goryeo dynasty (King Taejo) is home to more than a 100 shops selling snow crabs. In Uljin, a Snow Crab Festival (울진대게와 붉은대게축제) is held every February.

== Gallery ==
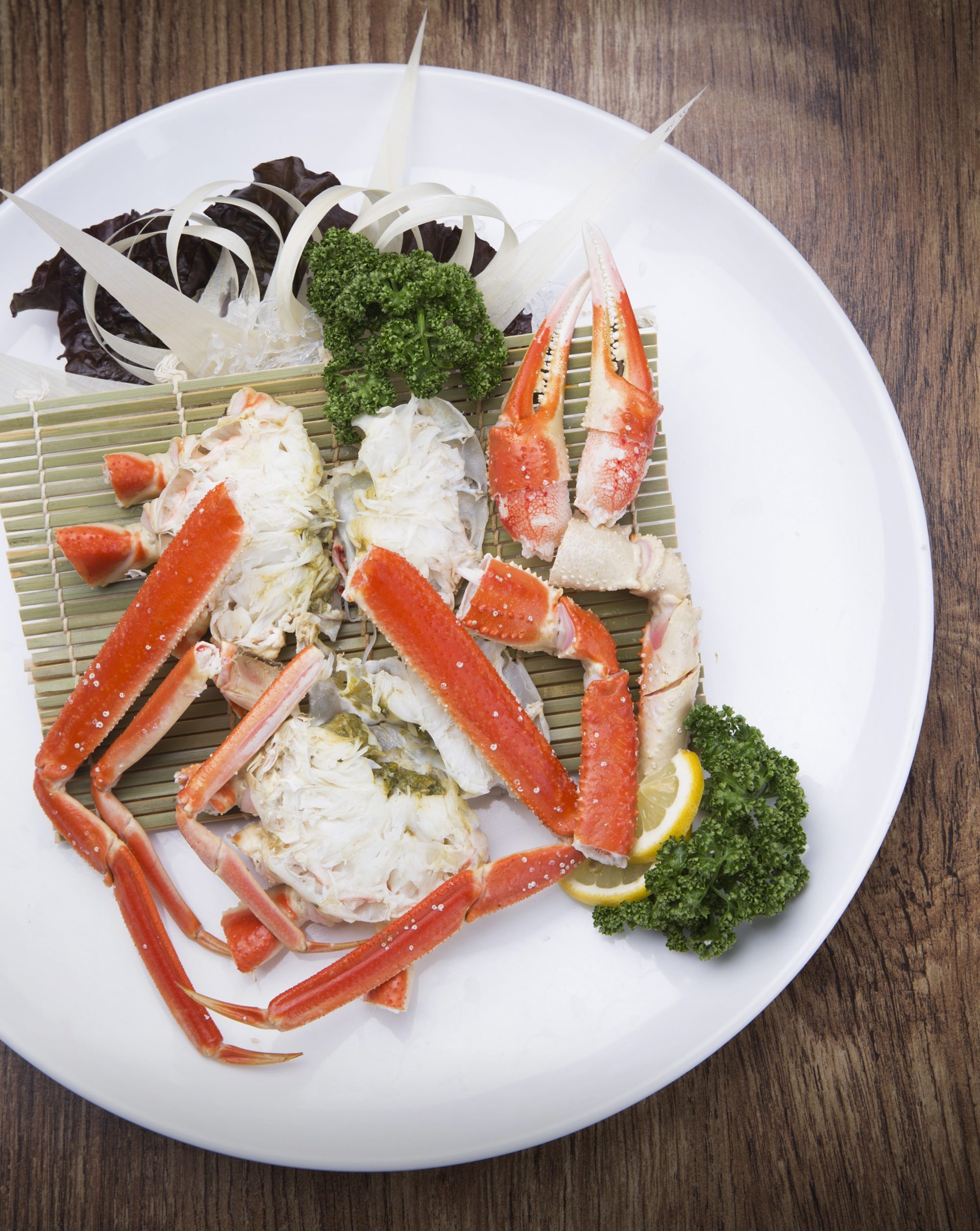
Steamed snow crab

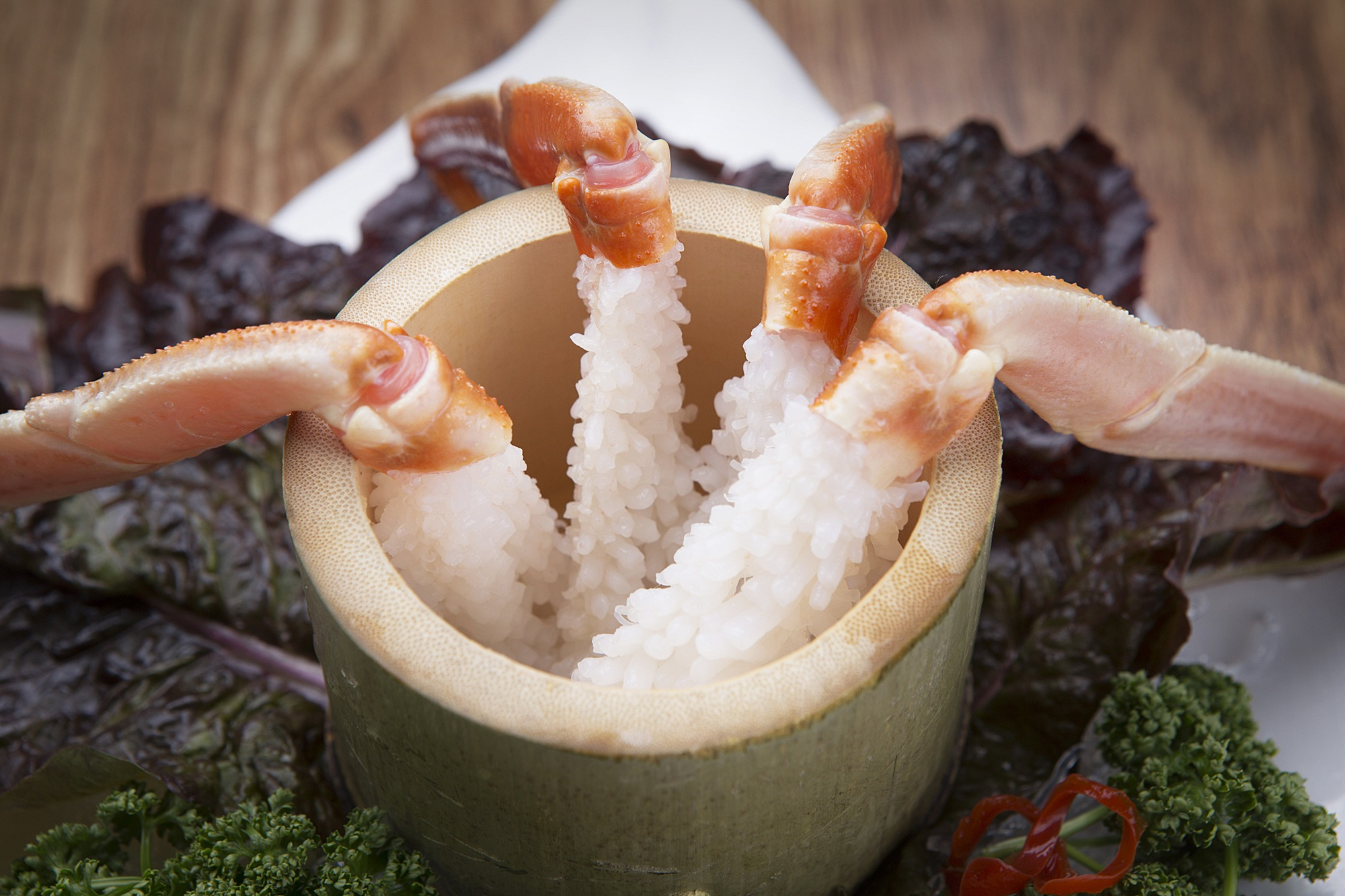
Steamed snow crab legs

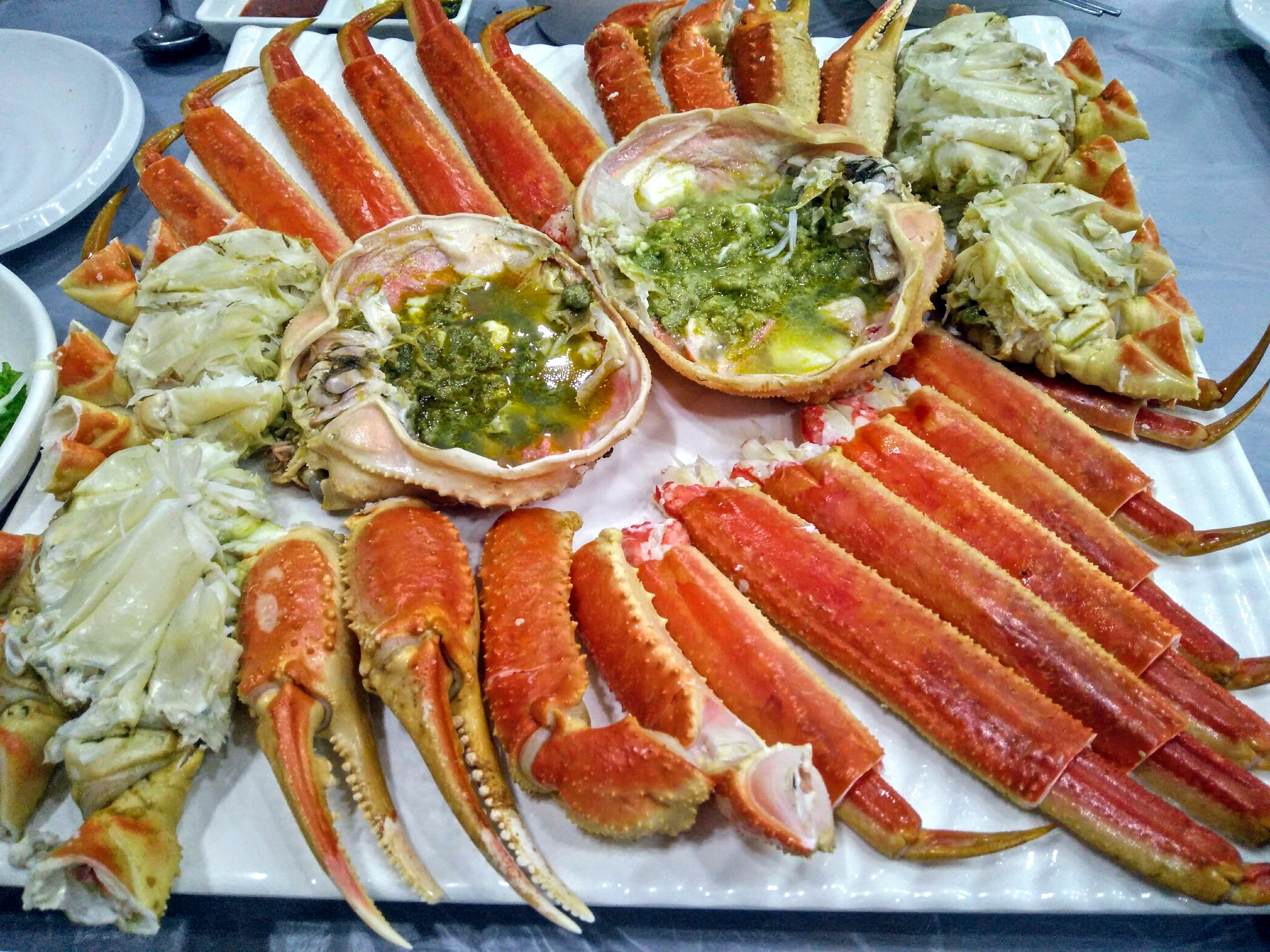
Steamed snow crab

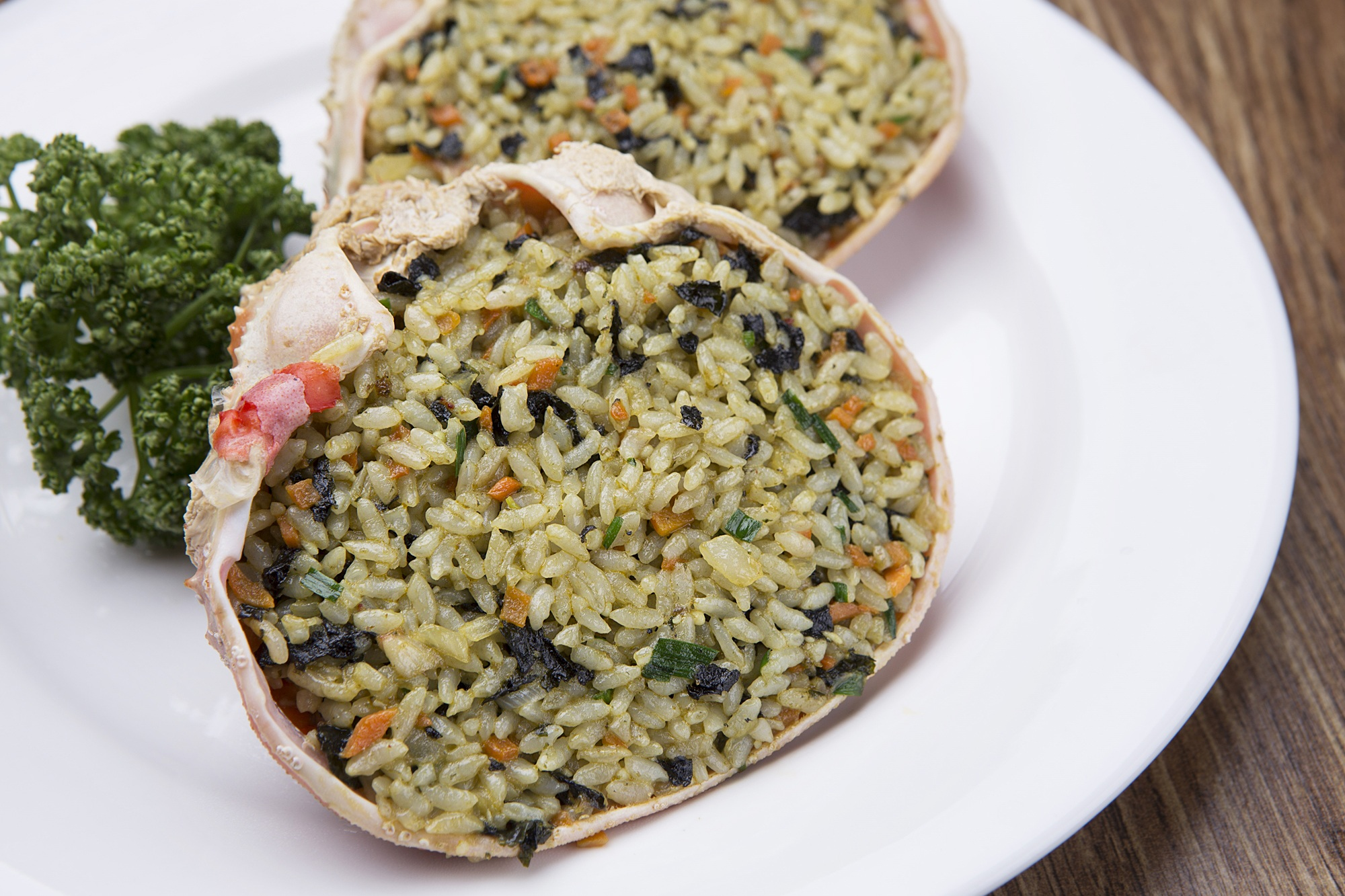
Snow crab fried rice on crab shell

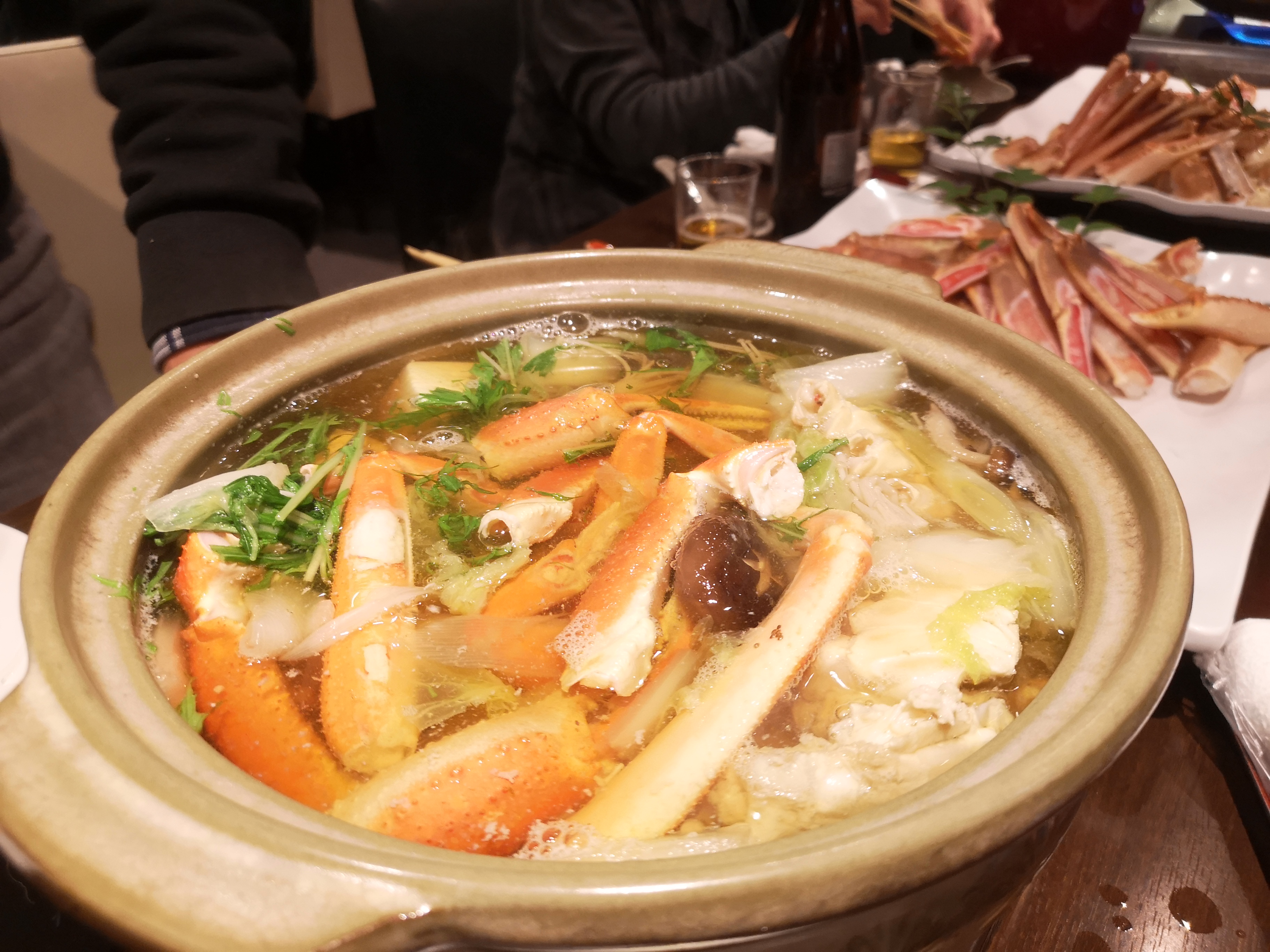
Snow crab nabe

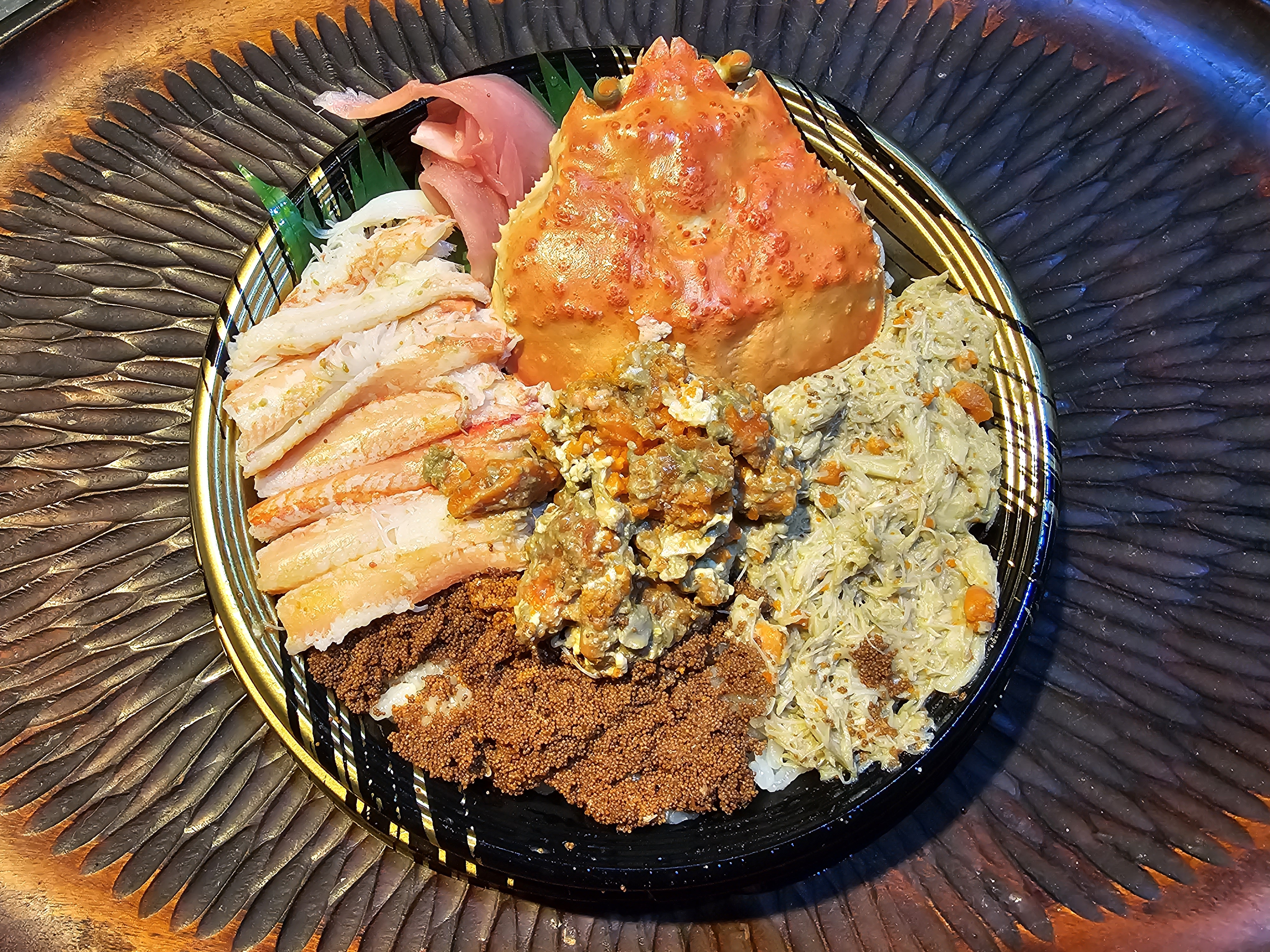
Snow crab roe and sushi

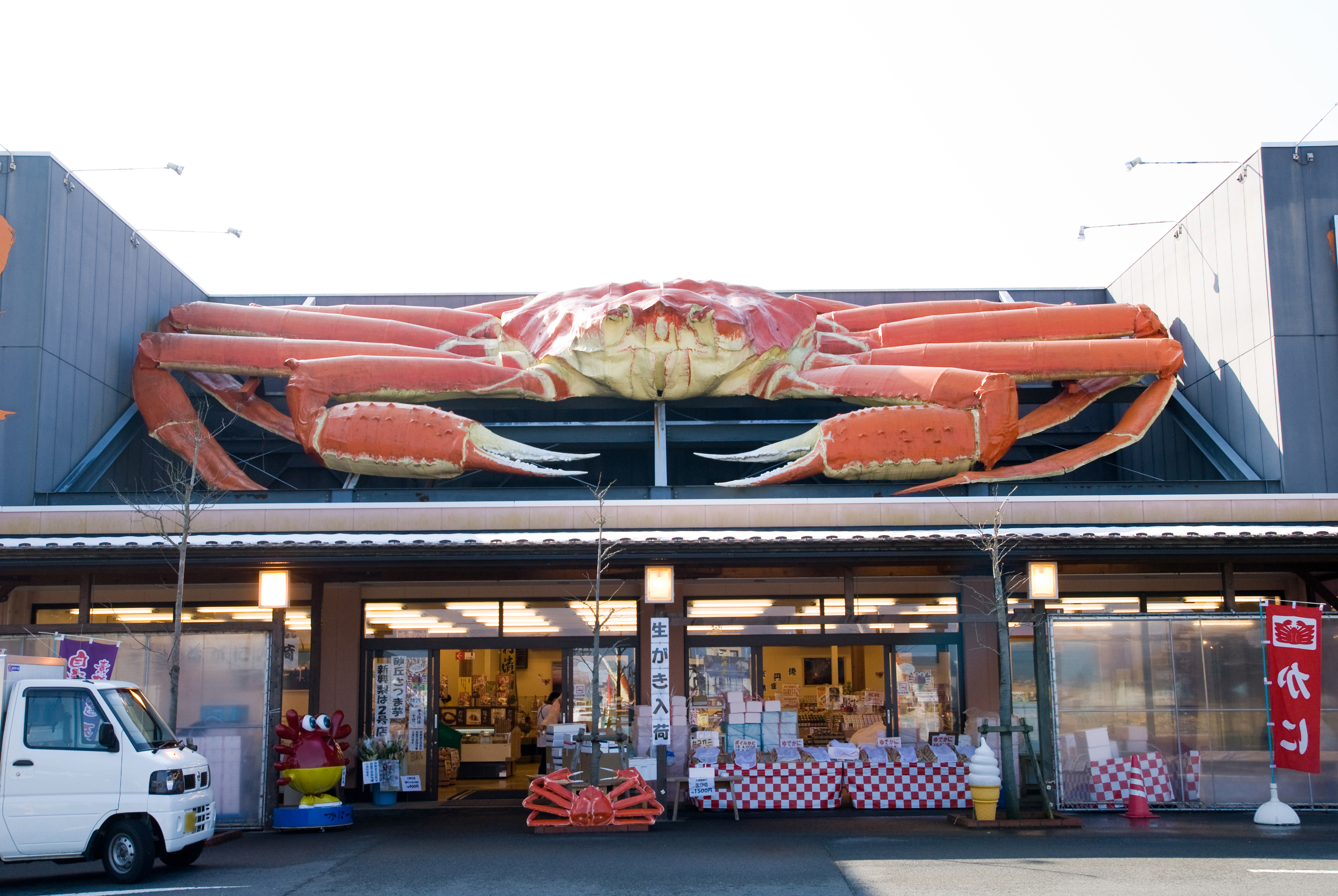
A snow crab direct seller in Kyōtango City
