= Hematodinium perezi =

Scientific classification
- Domain: Eukaryota
- Clade: Sar
- Superphylum: Alveolata
- Phylum: Dinoflagellata
- Class: Syndiniophyceae
- Order: Syndiniales
- Family: Syndiniaceae
- Genus: Hematodinium
- Species: H. perezi

Binomial name
- Hematodinium perezi Chatton & Poisson, 1931

Species of single-celled organism

Hematodinium perezi is a pathogenic dinoflagellate parasite that infects crustaceans, including the Blue Crab and Norway Lobster and has been observed to have a significant impact on crustacean fisheries. Infected crustaceans frequently show signs of weakness and lethargy, and often die due to stress-related handling from fishing as well as metabolic exhaustion due to reduced feeding. This parasite is known to be quite transmissible between various crustacean hosts.

H. perezi is the type species of the genus Hematodinium, and H. perezi has only recently been identified as the specific parasitic cause of bitter crab disease. In the east coast of the United States, the disease is most prevalent in the autumn months when the species blooms off the Mid-Atlantic coast. Infected crabs have been observed to have mortality rates as high as 86 percent after only a few weeks, and infection is found to be more prevalent in higher salinity waters towards the mouth of the bay where Callinectes go to spawn, generally 12 PSU and up.

H. perezi demonstrates tropism for the hemolymph of crabs and diagnosis of Hematodinium infection can be made with through microscopic visualization of the parasite in prepared slides.
