= College of Fisheries and Ocean Sciences =

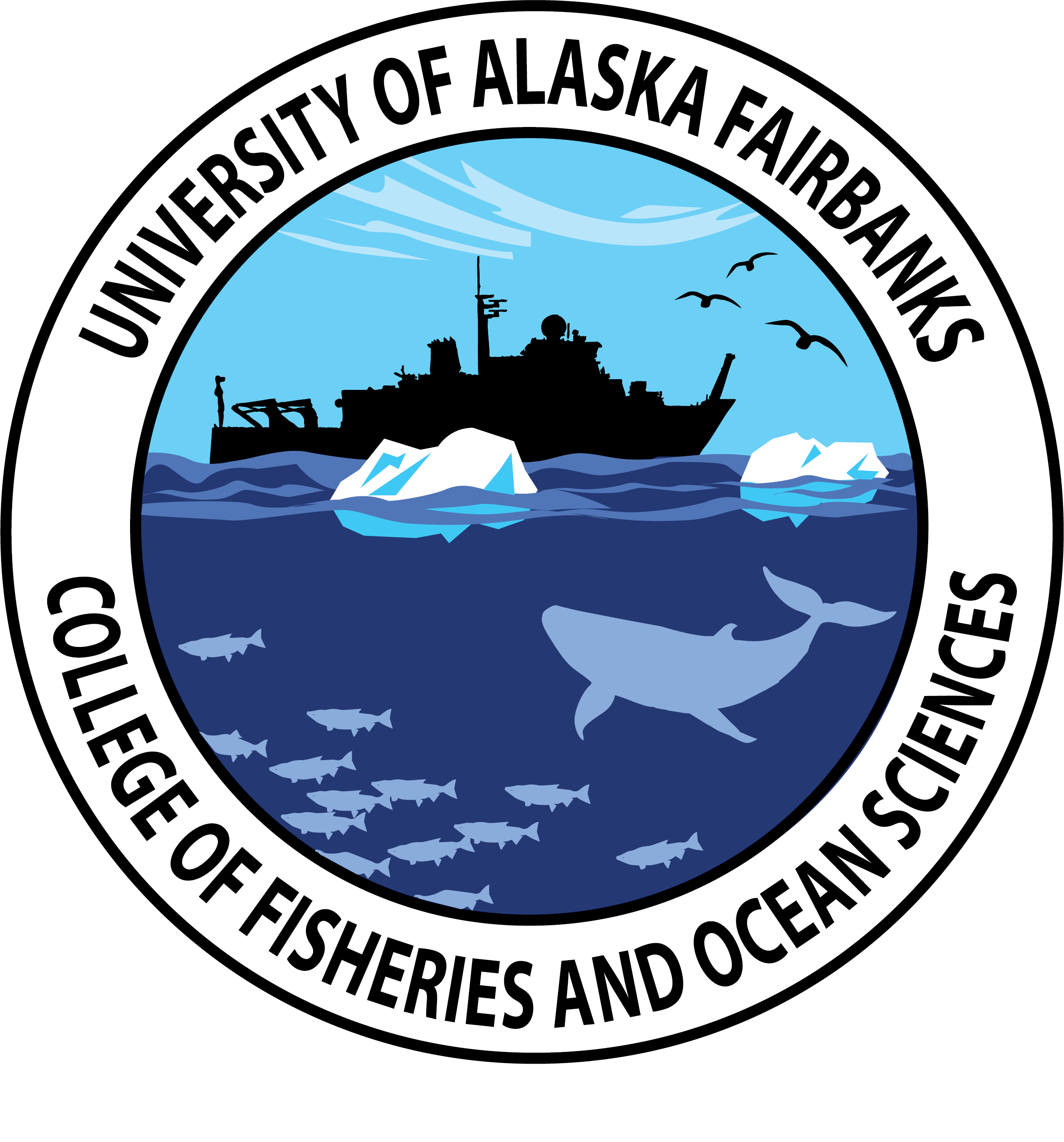
- Type: Public
- Established: 2016
- Parent institution: University of Alaska Fairbanks
- Academic affiliations: NOAA, Alaska Sea Grant
- Location: Fairbanks, Alaska, United States; 64.8590°N 147.8494°W
- Campus: Urban and remote
- Website: uaf.edu/cfos

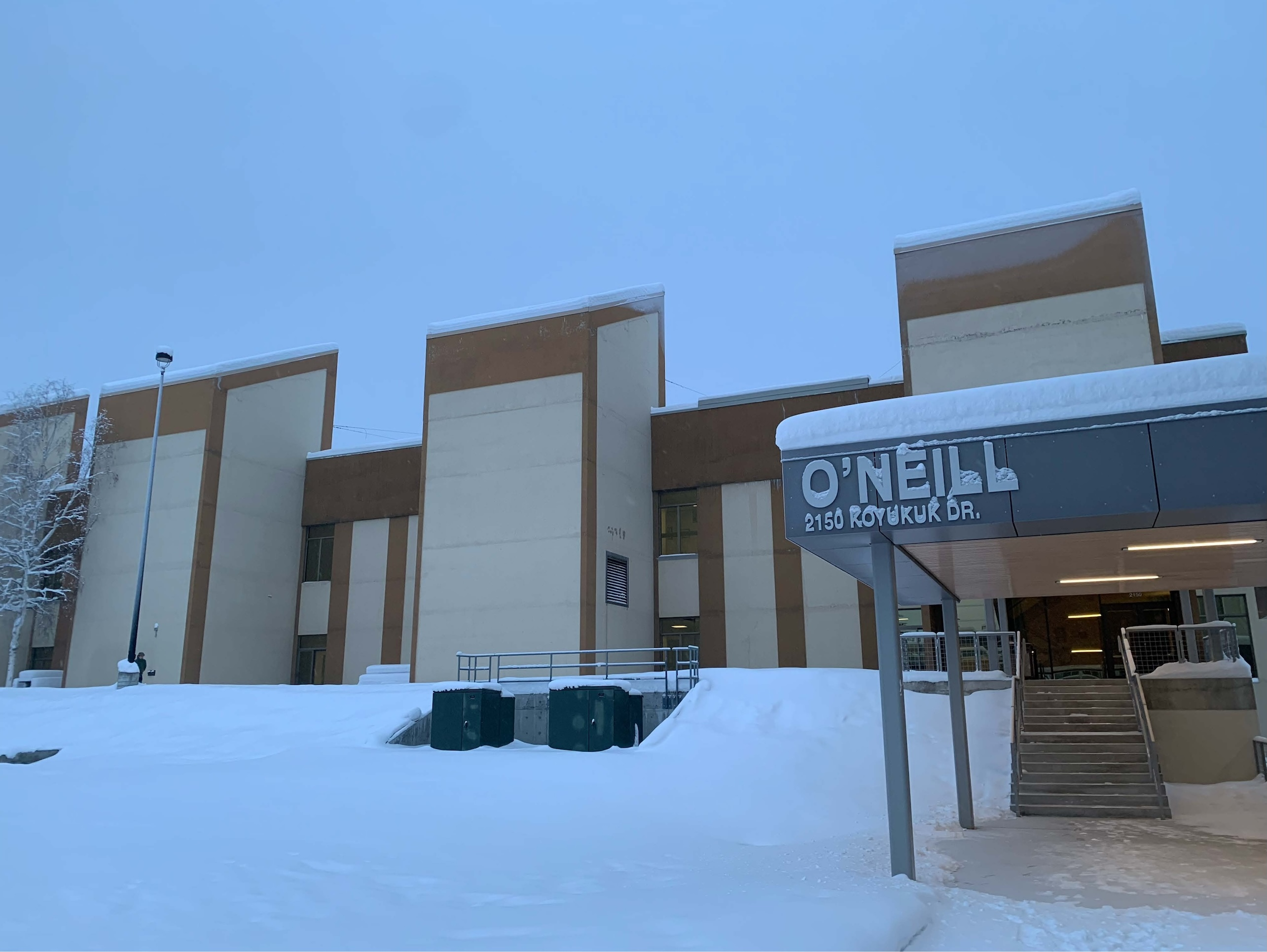
O'Neill Building sits atop a little hill, covered in snow in the mid-winter light.

The College of Fisheries and Ocean Sciences, or CFOS, is part of the University of Alaska Fairbanks. CFOS offers a bachelor of arts and a bachelor of science in fisheries, master’s and doctoral degrees in oceanography, fisheries and marine biology, and a minor in marine science.

The college was established by the University of Alaska Board of Regents in 2016 from units at several campuses and placed under a single umbrella administered within the University of Alaska Fairbanks.

CFOS is headquartered in Fairbanks, Alaska, with major divisions in Seward, Anchorage, Juneau and Kodiak:

The Institute of Marine Science in Fairbanks is active in research and graduate training at the master's and doctoral levels. IMS conducts marine science studies in the world’s oceans, with special emphasis on arctic and Pacific subarctic waters.

The Kodiak Seafood and Marine Science Center in Kodiak works to increase the value of the Alaska fishing industry through academic and research programs in sustainable harvesting and seafood technology.

The NOAA Alaska Sea Grant College Program in Fairbanks funds marine research, offers education and advisory services, distributes information about Alaska’s seas and coasts and provides outreach to coastal communities.

The Seward Marine Center in Seward provides access to saltwater laboratories and the coastal environment with laboratories, constant temperature chambers and a running seawater system. The University of Alaska's new icebreaker, the RV Sikuliaq will be based here.

The Fisheries Division in Juneau and Fairbanks collaborates with state, national and international organizations to study how to develop and maintain sustainable fisheries programs in Alaska and global waters. Faculty at the Fisheries Division train undergraduate and graduate students in fisheries.

== Research projects ==
The college is involved in the first ever study of ocean acidification in the North Pacific and its effects on fish. They are also part of an ongoing project to use radar to map surface currents in the Arctic Ocean, and UAF CFOS researchers designed and deployed a solar and wind powered "remote power module" to provide energy for the programs equipment, which is often located in remote, unpopulated areas.
