= Theodor Pištěk (artist) =

Czech painter and designer (1932–2025)

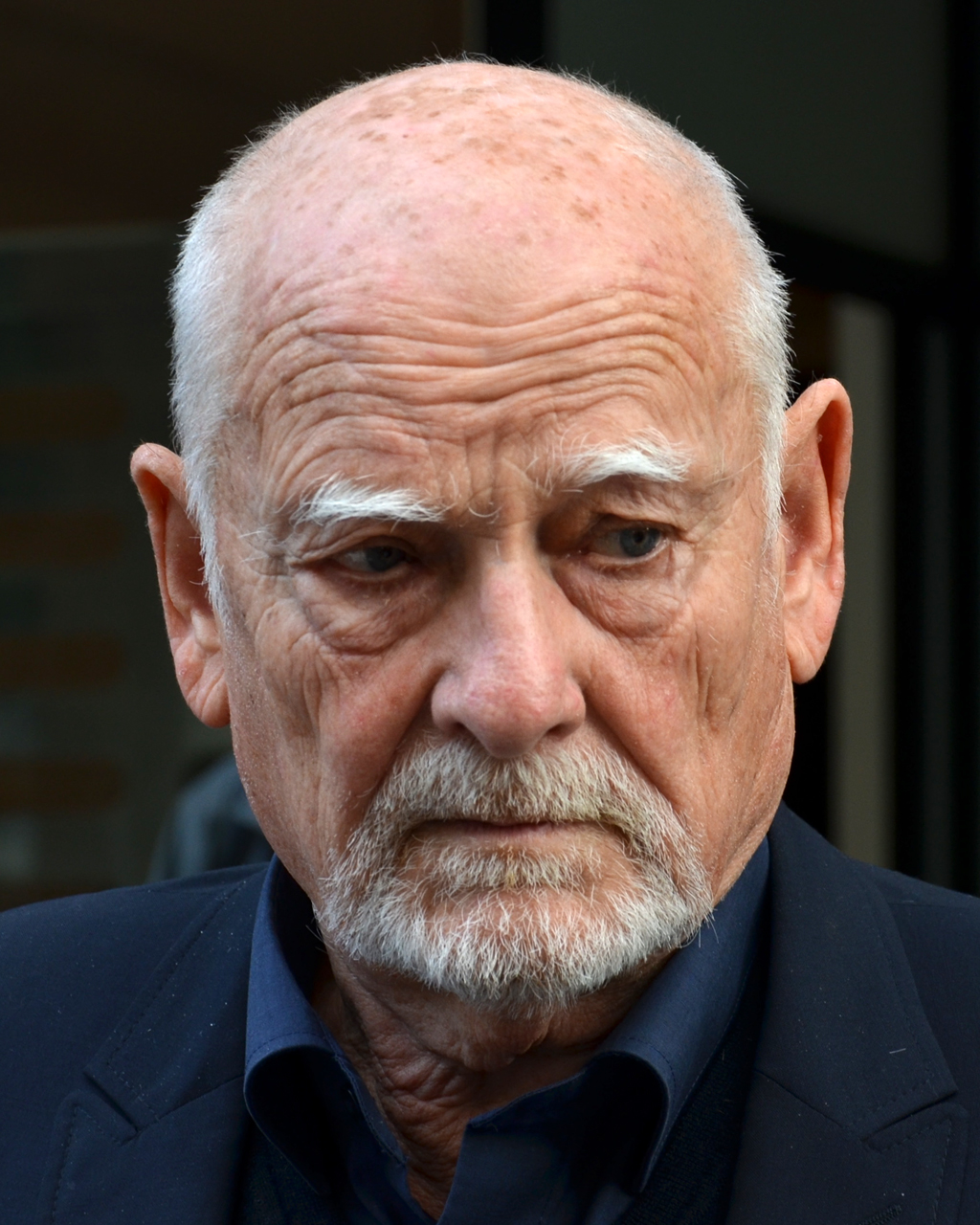
- Pištěk in 2017
- Born: 25 October 1932; Prague, Czechoslovakia
- Died: 3 December 2025 (aged 93)
- Education: Academy of Fine Arts in Prague
- Occupations: Painter; set designer; costume desingner
- Partner: Věra Filipová
- Children: 2
- Father: Theodor Pištěk
- Awards: Academy Award for Best Costume Design (1985); César Award for Best Costume Design (1990); First Grade Medal of Merit (2000); Czech Lion Award for Unique Contribution to Czech Film (2003); Crystal Globe for Outstanding Artistic Contribution to World Cinema (2013)

Theodor Pištěk (25 October 1932 – 3 December 2025) was a Czech painter, costume designer, set designer, and racing driver. His costume designs and film sets are internationally acclaimed. He won an Oscar for his costumes for Amadeus, directed by Miloš Forman. For Forman's next film, Valmont, Pištěk won a César Award and was nominated for a second Oscar. In 2003, he received the Czech Lion Award for Unique Contribution to Czech Film, in 2013, he was awarded the Crystal Globe for Outstanding Artistic Contribution to World Cinema, and in 2017, he received the Golden Slipper for Outstanding Contribution to Films for Children and Young People.

== Life and career ==
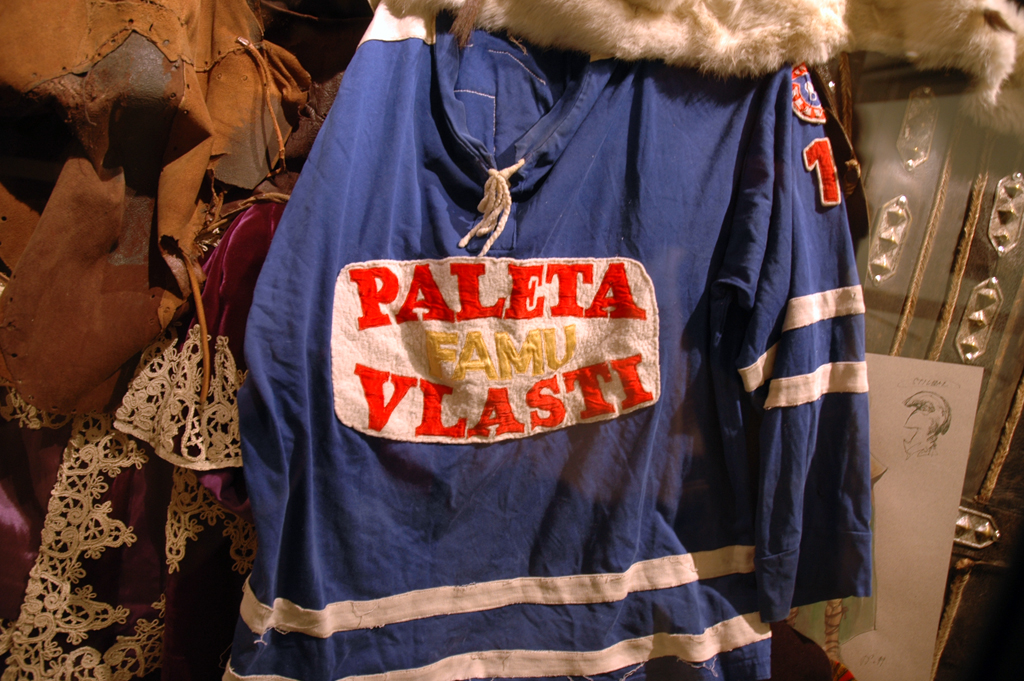
Theodor Pištěk, Palette of the Motherland ice hockey club dress, 1962

Theodor Pištěk is the son of two actors, Theodor Pištěk and Marie Ženíšková. He inherited his family's artistic talent and love of automobiles: his great-grandfather František Ženíšek was a painter, and his grandfather Julius Ženíšek worked for the Wright Company and was the founder and owner of the Ford Motor Company's branch in Austria-Hungary; in 1895 Julius Ženíšek became one of the first to own a racing car. The actions of his business partner bankrupted the company, and the family was forced to sell Ženíšek's valuable collection of paintings.

After four years at a grammar school, Theodor Pištěk switched to the School of Applied Arts in Prague (1948–1952), where his fellow students included Aleš Veselý and Milan Ressel. Pištěk learned to drive when he was just 16 years old, and at the age of 18, after passing his driving test, he joined the Automotoklub and started competing in car races. In 1952, he was accepted by the Academy of Fine Arts in Prague, where he was studying under Vratislav Nechleba, a prominent portrait painter. At the time of his studies, a number of respected pre-war artists and historians (Miloslav Holý, Vlastimil Rada, Vladimír Sychra, Otakar Španiel, Jan Lauda, Václav Vilém Štech) held professorships at the Academy, and among the students were Jan Koblasa, Karel Nepraš, Bedřich Dlouhý, František Mertl, Jiří Valenta, Milan Ressel, Hugo Demartini, Aleš Veselý and Jaroslav Vožniak. His graduation painting, Boxer, earned him an extension to his studies in the form of an honours year in Antonín Pelc's studio. A mastery of painting was important, but Pištěk and his fellow students and friends were more interested in modern art. They countered the oppressiveness of communist rule with all manner of absurdist extracurricular activities. In 1962, Pištěk and a group called The Šmidras founded an amateur ice hockey club called Palette of the Motherland, whose president he was in 1977–1979.

In 1958, Theodor Pištěk married Věra Filipová, an assistant film director, with whom he had two sons (Jan, born 1961 and Martin, born 1967). In the following year, he designed costumes and sets for František Vláčil's film The White Dove. He had a studio in Břevnov in Prague, next door to Zbyněk Sekal's studio, thanks to whom Pištěk met the art critic Jindřich Chalupecký and exhibited as a guest with the May 57 group in 1964–1968. The two artists remained close friends until Sekal's emigration in 1968; Pištěk subsequently visited him in Vienna, where he met the sculptor Karl Prantl.

Pištěk's first solo exhibition was in 1960 at the Film Club in Prague. In 1964–1968, he was included in exhibitions by the Concretist Club. In 1964, he acquired a new studio from Hugo Demartini in Vinohrady. In the 1960s, he was a racing driver, and he competed on circuits and in the European Cup (1967–1969). In 1967, he worked as a costume designer on František Vláčil's films Marketa Lazarová and The Valley of the Bees, and was one of the artists who designed the Czechoslovak pavilion at Expo 67 in Montreal. In 1972–1973, he was nominated for the Czechoslovak national circuit racing team. Pištěk stopped racing in 1974, but he drew on his experience as a racing driver to co-write with Vláčil the screenplay for a film called Rally. Since 1975, Pištěk has concentrated on painting. He was usually considered a photorealist, but in the Eastern Bloc such paintings almost always had a clandestine symbolism that could be read between the lines.

In 1977, a cycle of paintings by Pištěk received a special mention from the jury at the International Festival of Painting in Cagnes-sur-Mer in France, together with a grant that allowed him to visit artists’ studios. After his success in France, several Czech galleries bought his paintings. In the 1980s, he worked as a costume designer for Miloš Forman, winning an Oscar for Amadeus (1984), for which he was also nominated for a British Academy Film Award. For his work on Forman's next film, Valmont (1989), he was nominated for the same two awards, and he won a César Award from the Académie des Arts et Techniques du Cinéma. In the United States, he accepted an invitation to become a member of the Academy of Motion Picture Arts and Sciences.

In 1987, he exhibited artworks and costume designs at the Henry Art Gallery in Seattle and the Lincoln Center in New York, as well as Indianapolis and Sydney in Australia. Pištěk's exhibition in Seattle was curated by Meda Mládková and introduced by Zbigniew Brzezinski.

In 1990, Theodor Pištěk became the chairman of Václav Havel's Prague Castle's arts council and was commissioned to design new uniforms for the Prague Castle Guard. He initiated the Jindřich Chalupecký Award for young artists, becoming one of its founders (alongside Havel and Jiří Kolář).

In 1996, Pištěk had to vacate his studio, and he moved from Prague to Mukařov, where he had earlier designed and built a house. In 2000, President Václav Havel awarded him a First Grade Medal of Merit, for his achievements in art. In 2004, the Czech Film and Television Academy gave him the Czech Lion Award for Unique Contribution to Czech Film. At the 2013 Karlovy Vary International Film Festival, he received a Crystal Globe for Outstanding Artistic Contribution to World Cinema. In 2012–2013, he had a major retrospective at the National Gallery in Prague and in 2019/2020 another retrospective in the Brno House of Arts.

Pištěk died on 3 December 2025, at the age of 93.

== Work ==
=== Paintings, reliefs, installations ===
Theodor Pištěk mastered classic realistic oil painting while studying under then prominent portrait painter professor Vratislav Nechleba. For his graduation painting, Boxer, his studies were extended to include an honours year. At the end of the 1950s, he worked on portrait painting, but surprisingly his subsequent paintings did not draw on his training at the Academy, instead anticipating a Constructivist element in his art, to which he periodically returned in the late 1960s and early 1970s, and after 1990 in his three-dimensional installations. In 1960–1961, he created geometrical relief compositions in plaster as positive and negative diptychs (In and Out, 1960; Reverse, 1961).

In the early 1960s, he was in close contact with Zbyněk Sekal, whose studio was next door. They influenced one another when creating material paintings, and their work was based on similar feelings about life. It was at this time that Pištěk made a series of relief assemblages from automobile components (Synagogue, 1962; Crucifixion, 1963) and Art Informel reliefs from dismantled car radiators (Notes from a Missing Person, 1963; Execution, 1964). He also made his first three-dimensional installation, The Ten Commandments (1964).

As a counterpart to his material relief paintings, Theodor Pištěk painted airy black and white compositions in ink and nitrocellulose lacquer that combined simple geometrical forms with structures he had observed in the organic world. They are also his response to post-surrealist symbolism, something a fellow student from the Academy, Jaroslav Vožniak, was working on at this time. The subjects of these paintings were sometimes light-hearted (How to Play Ball, 1966) and sometimes fraught (How to Escape, 1965; Trap, 1965; Unsuccessful Attempt, 1966).

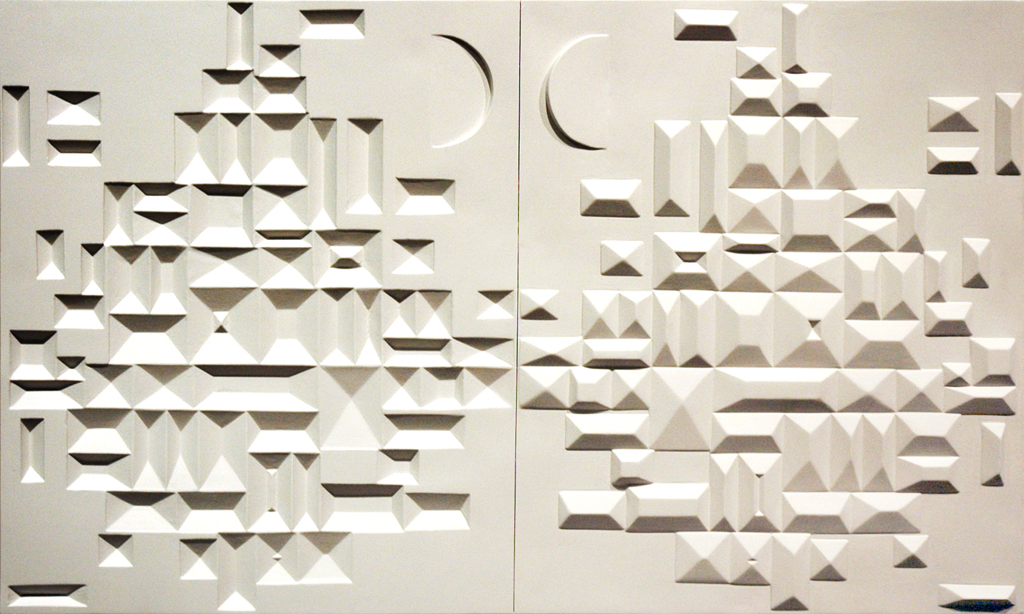
Reverse, 1961

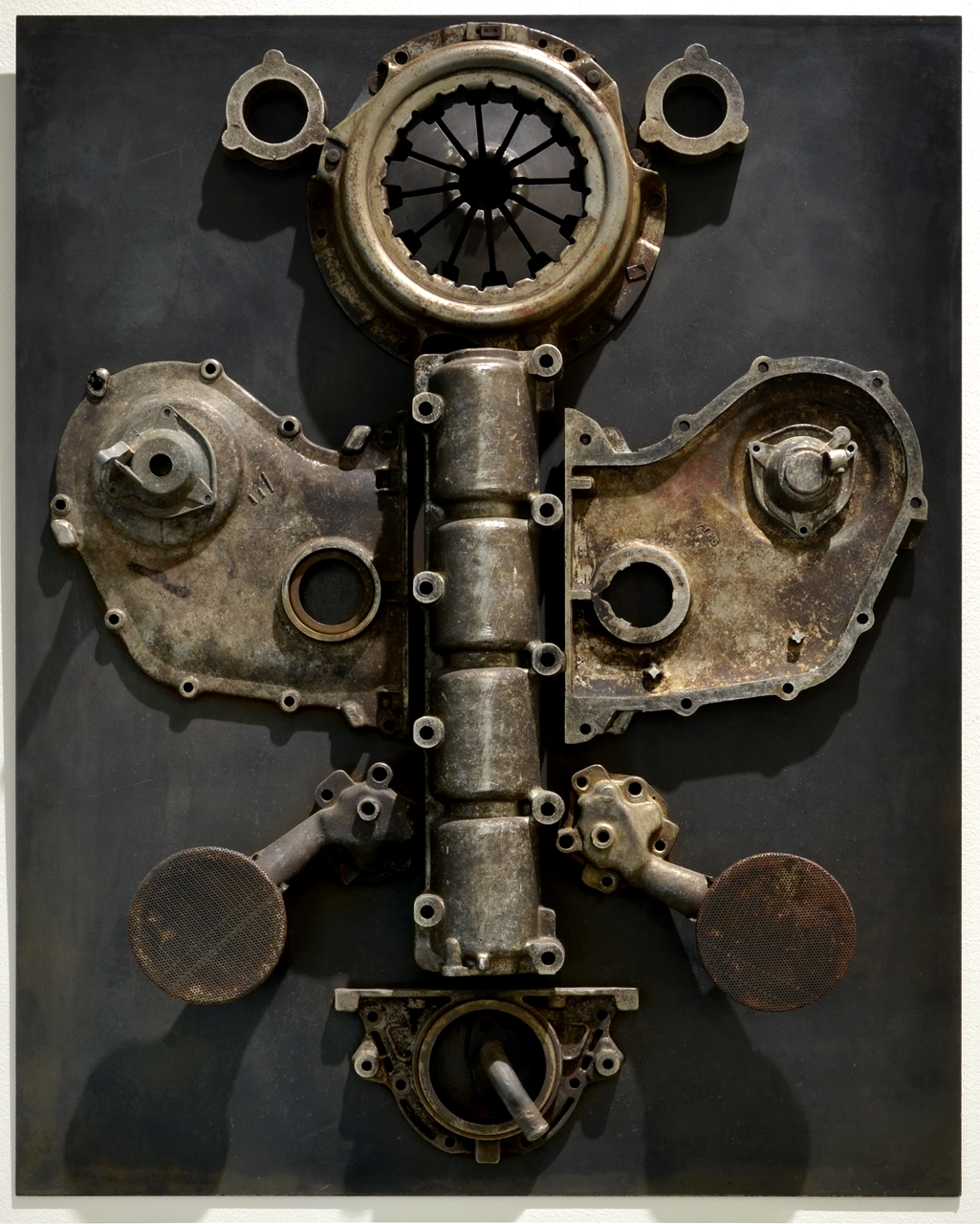
Fly, butterfly, fly!, 1962, Zlatá Husa Gallery

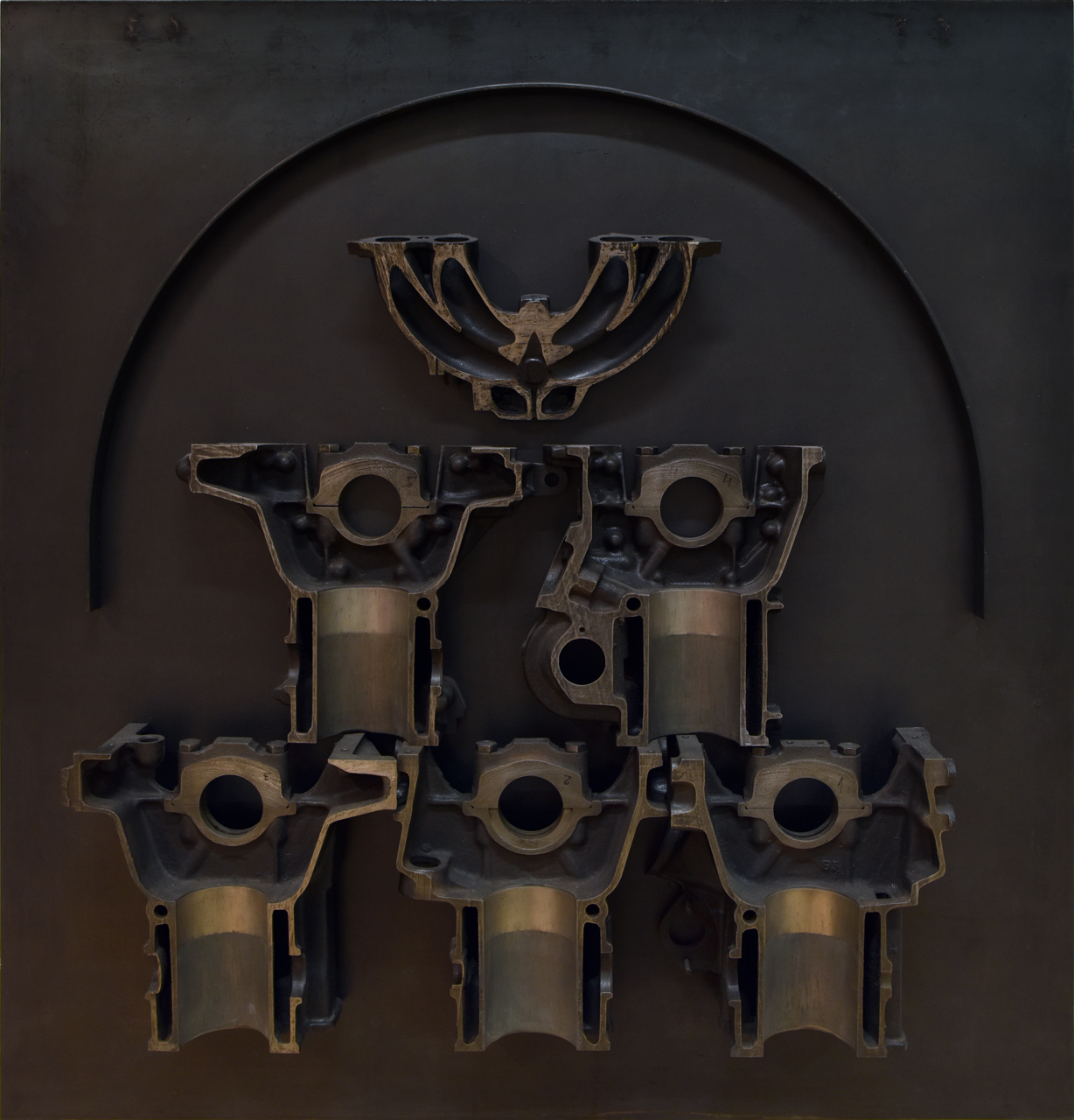
Synagogue, 1962, Zlatá Husa Gallery

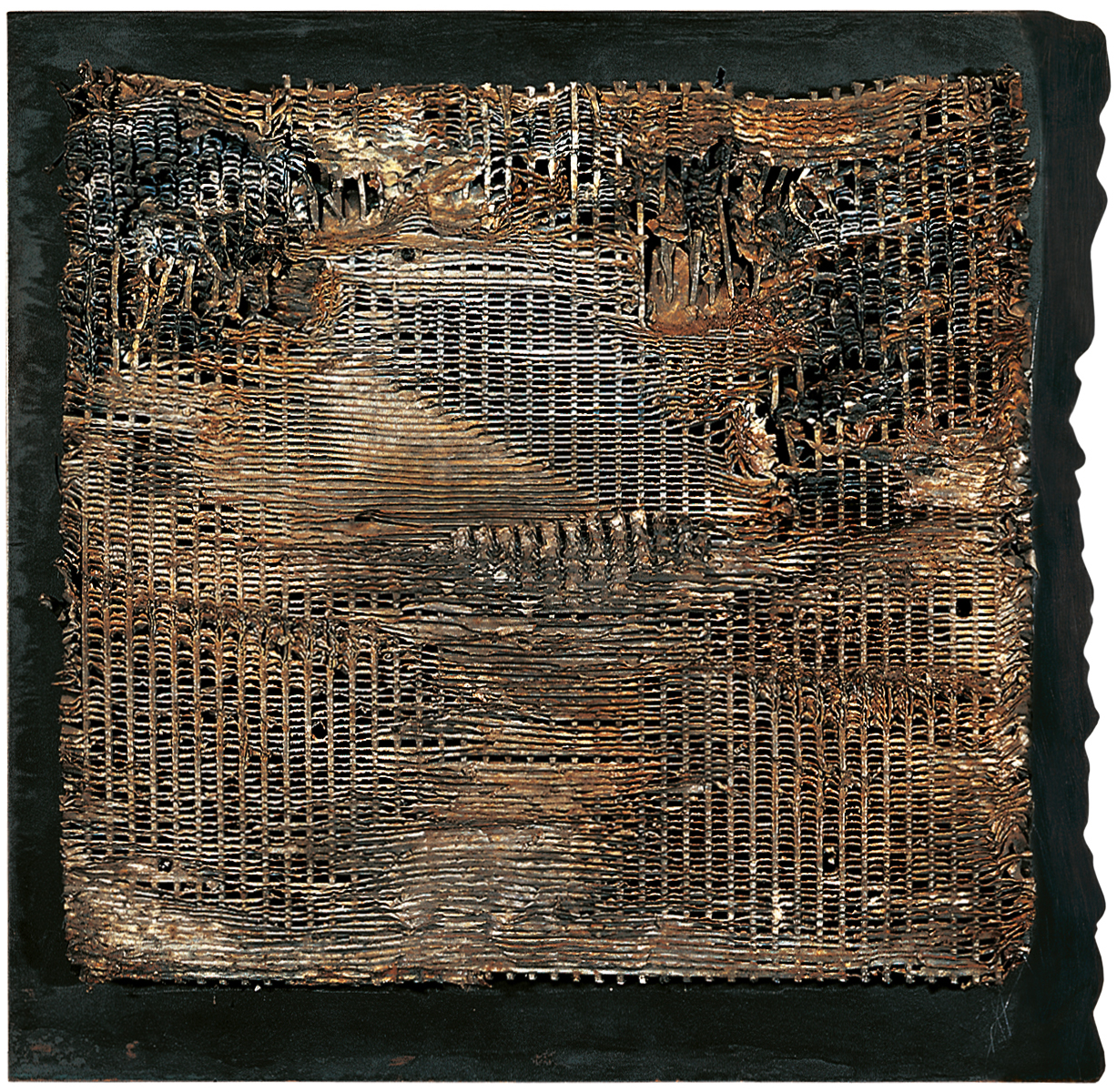
Notes from a Missing Person, 1963

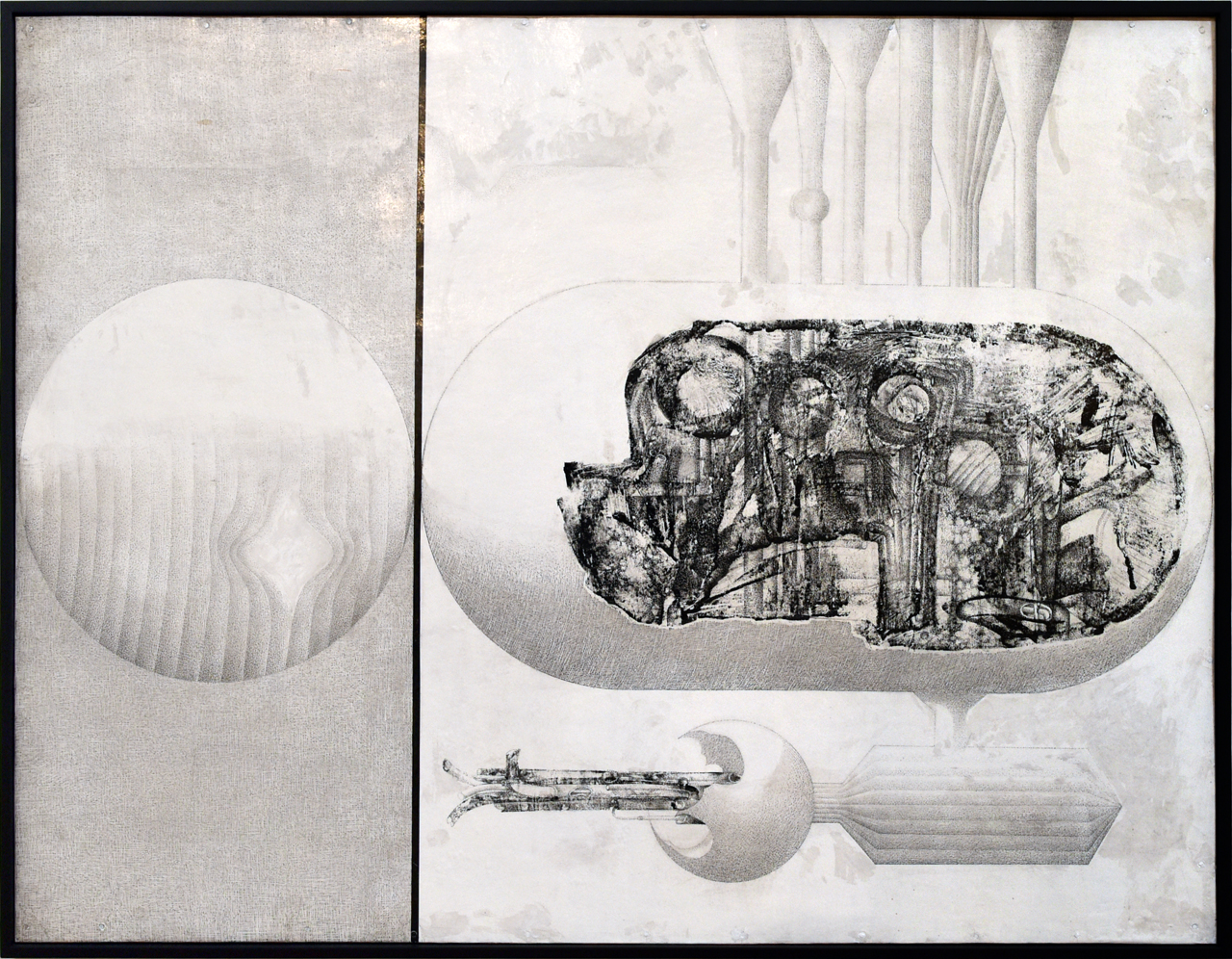
Unsuccessful Attempt 2, 1966

Following the Warsaw Pact invasion of Czechoslovakia in 1968, Pištěk's drawings resembled targets with bullet holes, and their composition was accented by the use of monochromatic blocks of colour (August Picture I–III, 1968–1969). His series of drawings in ink and nitrocellulose lacquer continued until the beginning of the 1970s (View Inside, 1970; Half-Life, 1970) and was followed by coloured compositions of geometrical forms (Reflection, 1971) and small-format oil paintings in which the geometrical order of blocks of colour was broken by small irregularities (Fall, 1973; House, 1973). He returned to monochrome paintings in ink and nitrocellulose lacquer in the early 1980s in compositions of artificial architecture (Where I Will Live Next, 1982), which later became three-dimensional labyrinths (City, 1997).

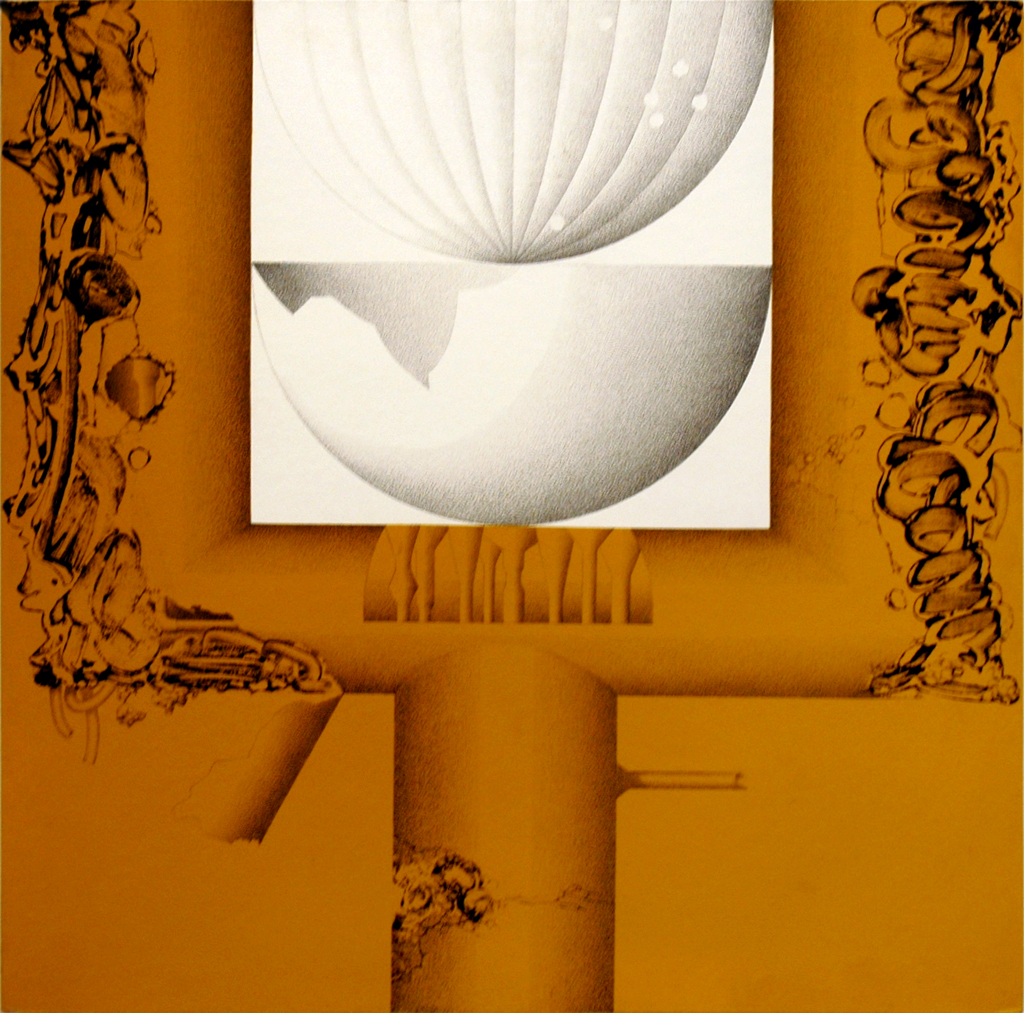
August Picture I, 1968

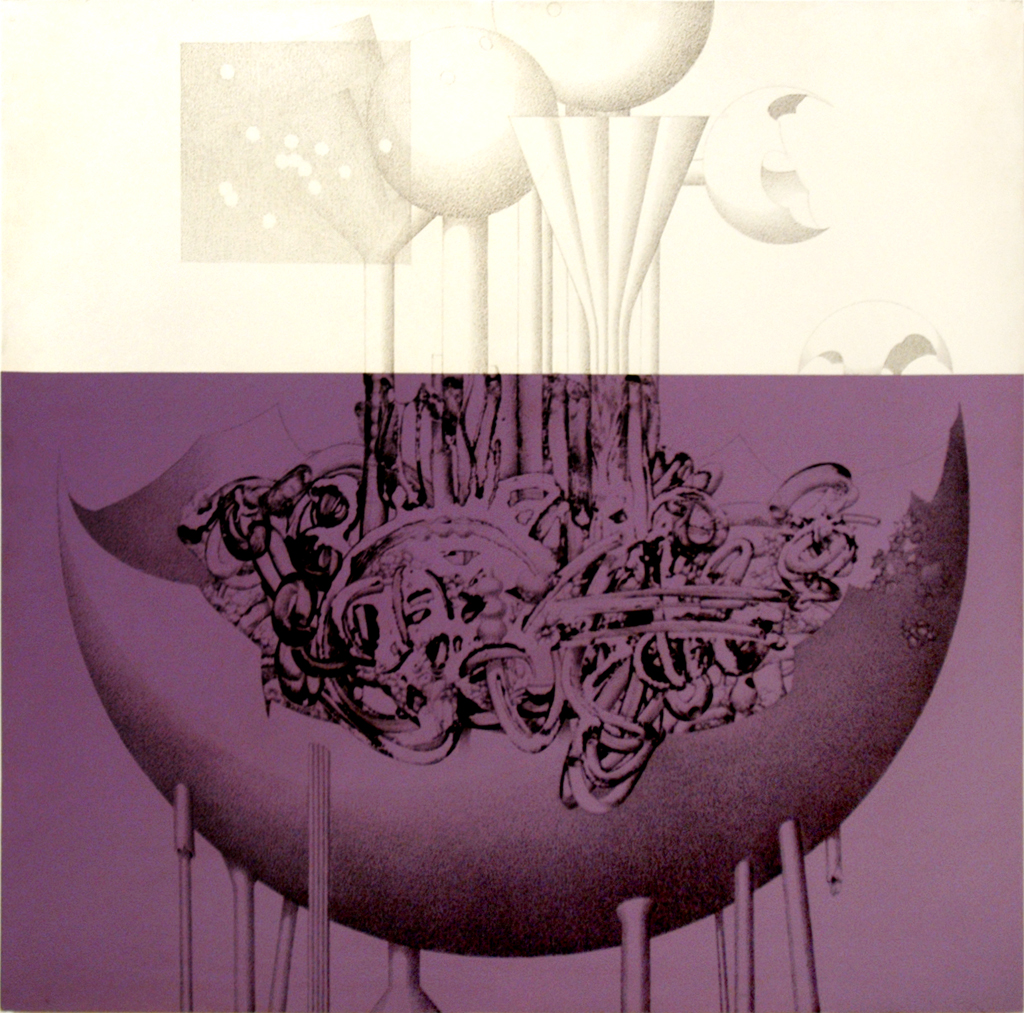
August Picture II, 1968

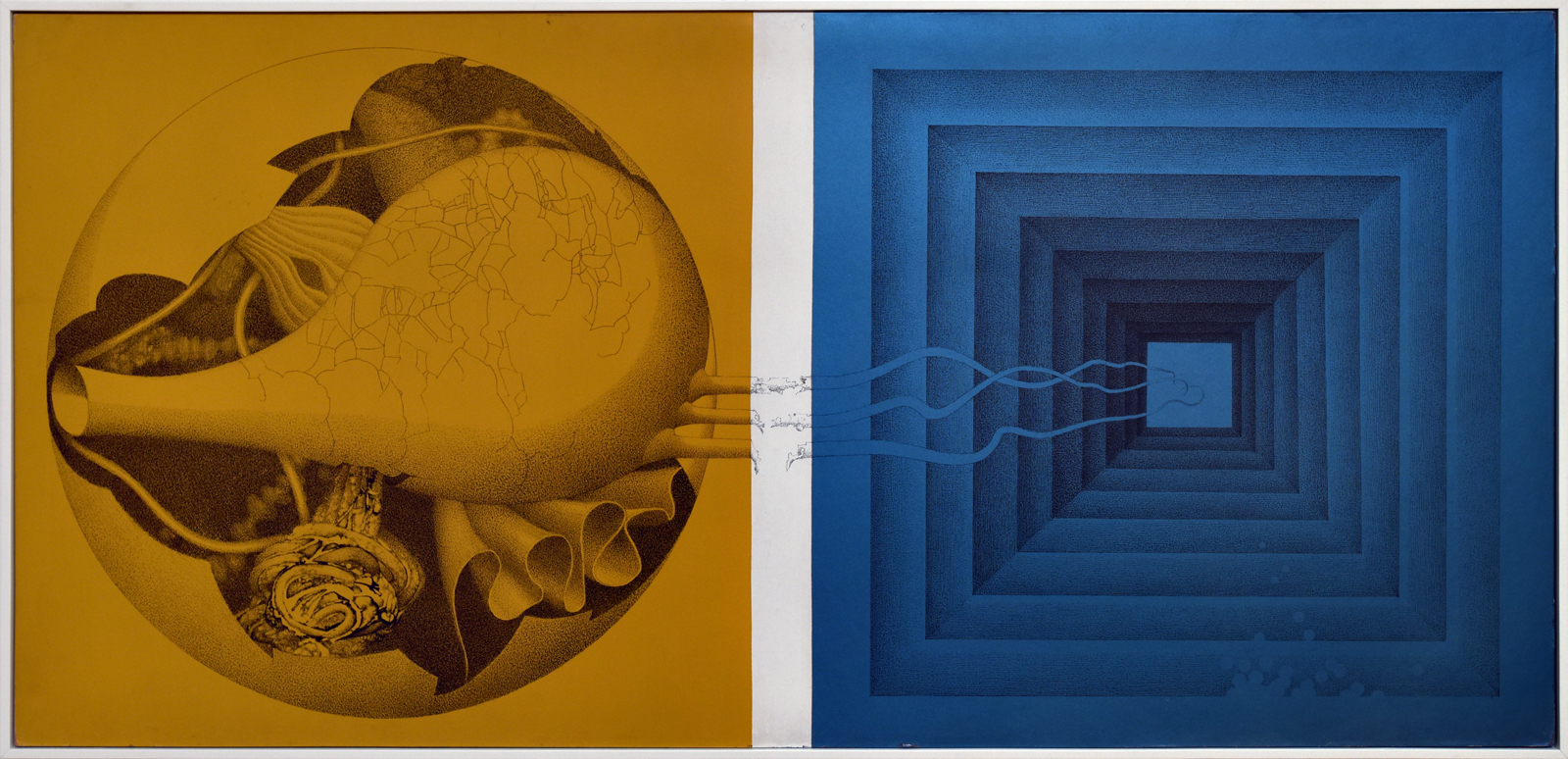
August Picture III (1969)

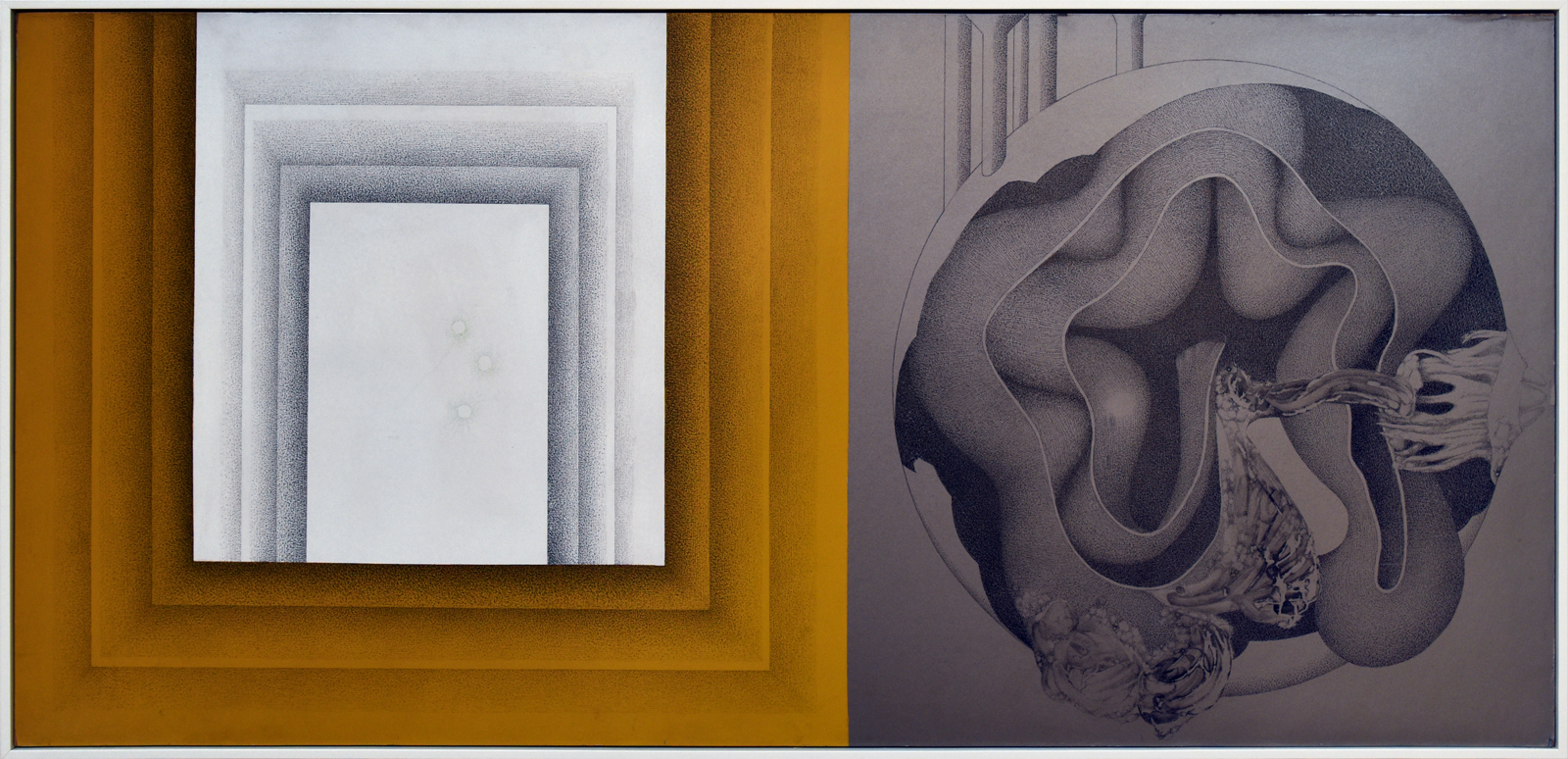
August Picture IV (1969)

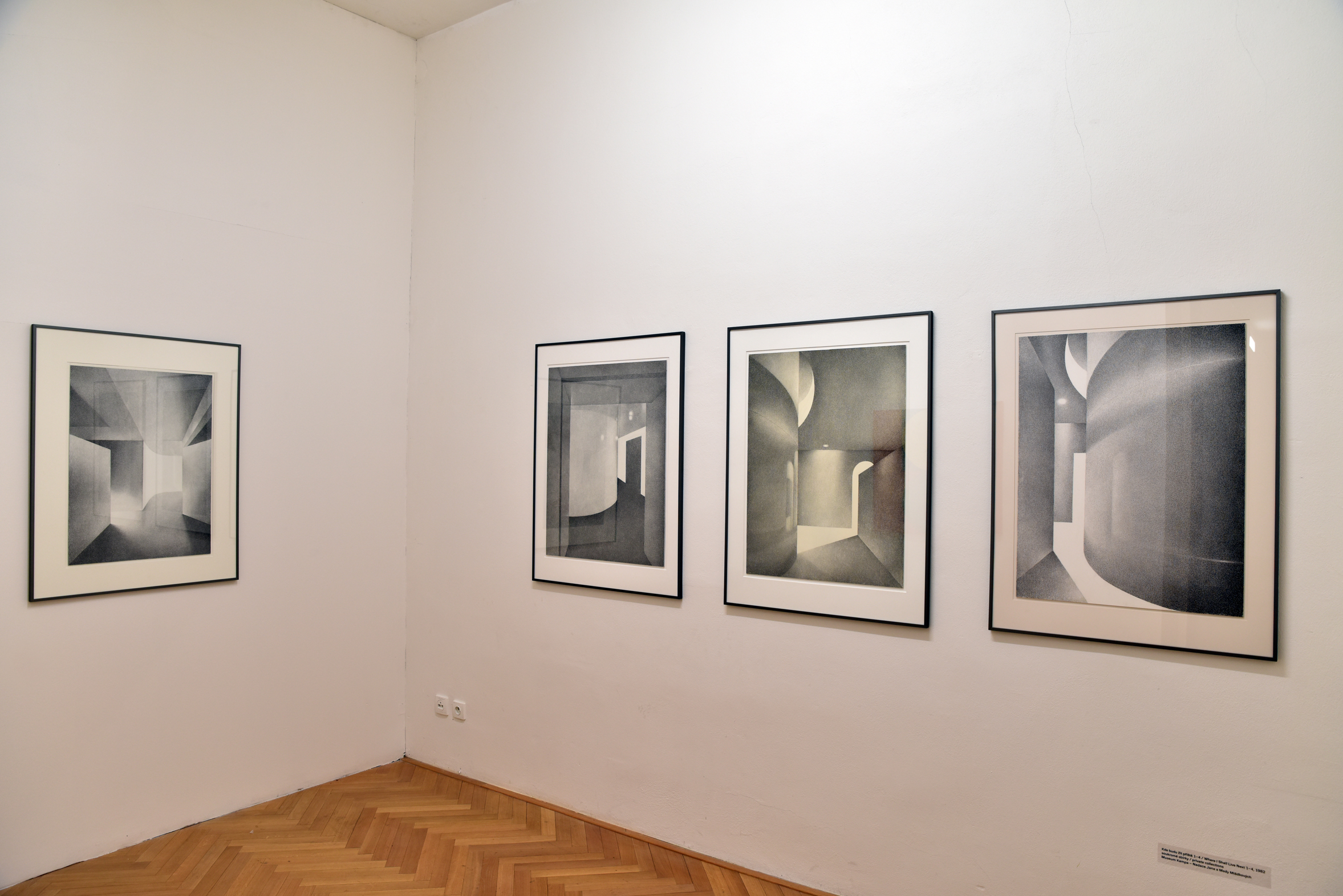
Where I Will Live Next, House of Art, Brno, 2019

At the height of communist repression during the normalization era, Pištěk's work featured wrapped figures and objects that served as abstract existential symbols. Fingers emerging from the wrappings indicate that these are not statues inside (Family Portrait, 1976; The Nude Maja, 1980). The motif of a wrapped head (Self-Portrait by the Window I-II, 1981) is in itself terrifying, and the emptiness or ornateness of the background makes this symbol of cruelty even more disturbing. Also from this, time is a cycle of illusionistic paintings in which crumpled fabric or paper bound with twine veils a hidden reality that can be glimpsed in places where the fabric or paper has been ripped. Usually, the opening reveals an endless blue sky with little clouds, but the painting Czech Horizon (1979) shows only black earth under a dark sky. In the triptych Farewell to Youth (1981), Theodor Pištěk symbolically bid his racing career goodbye.

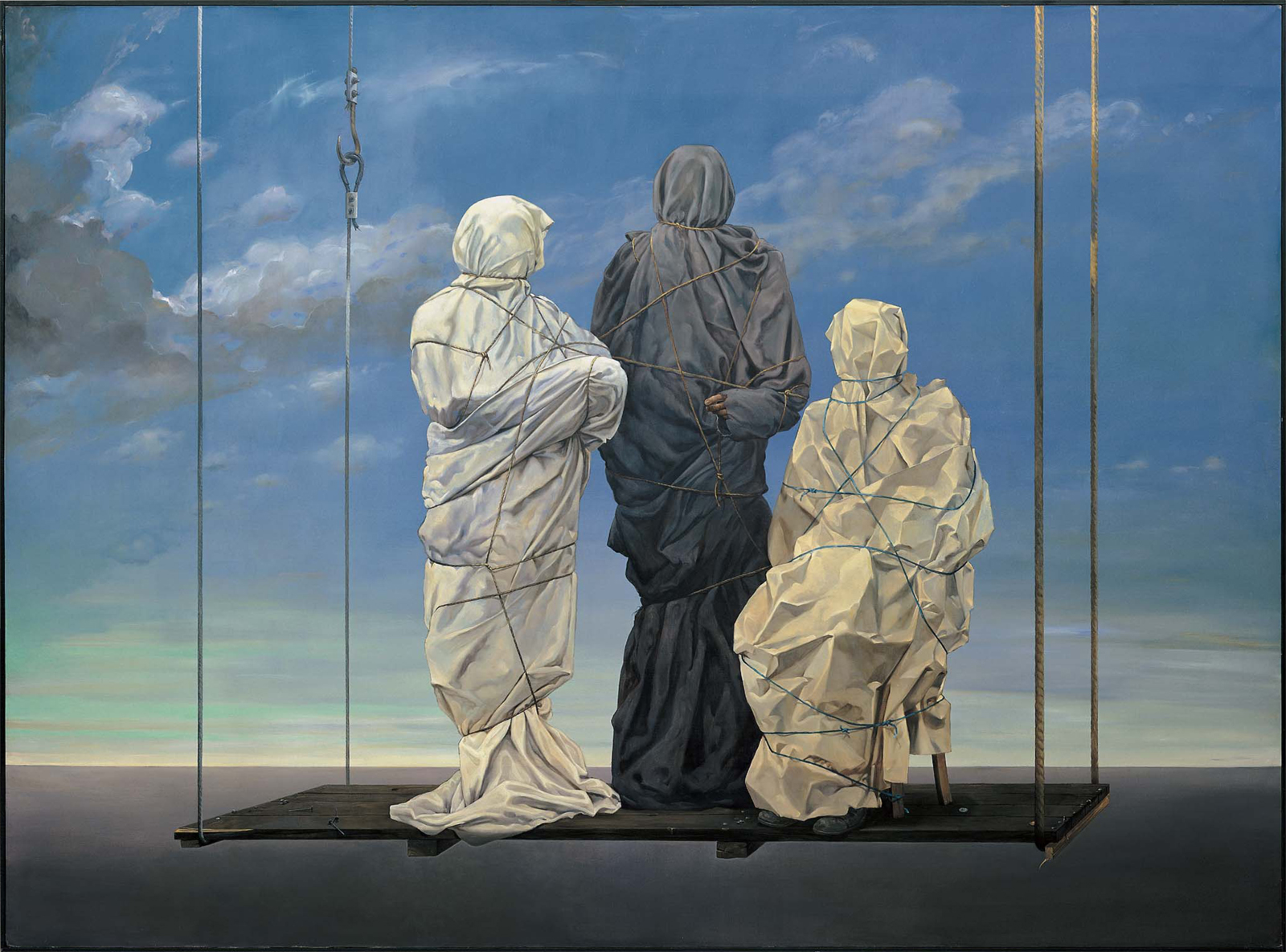
Family Portrait, 1976, Museum Kampa

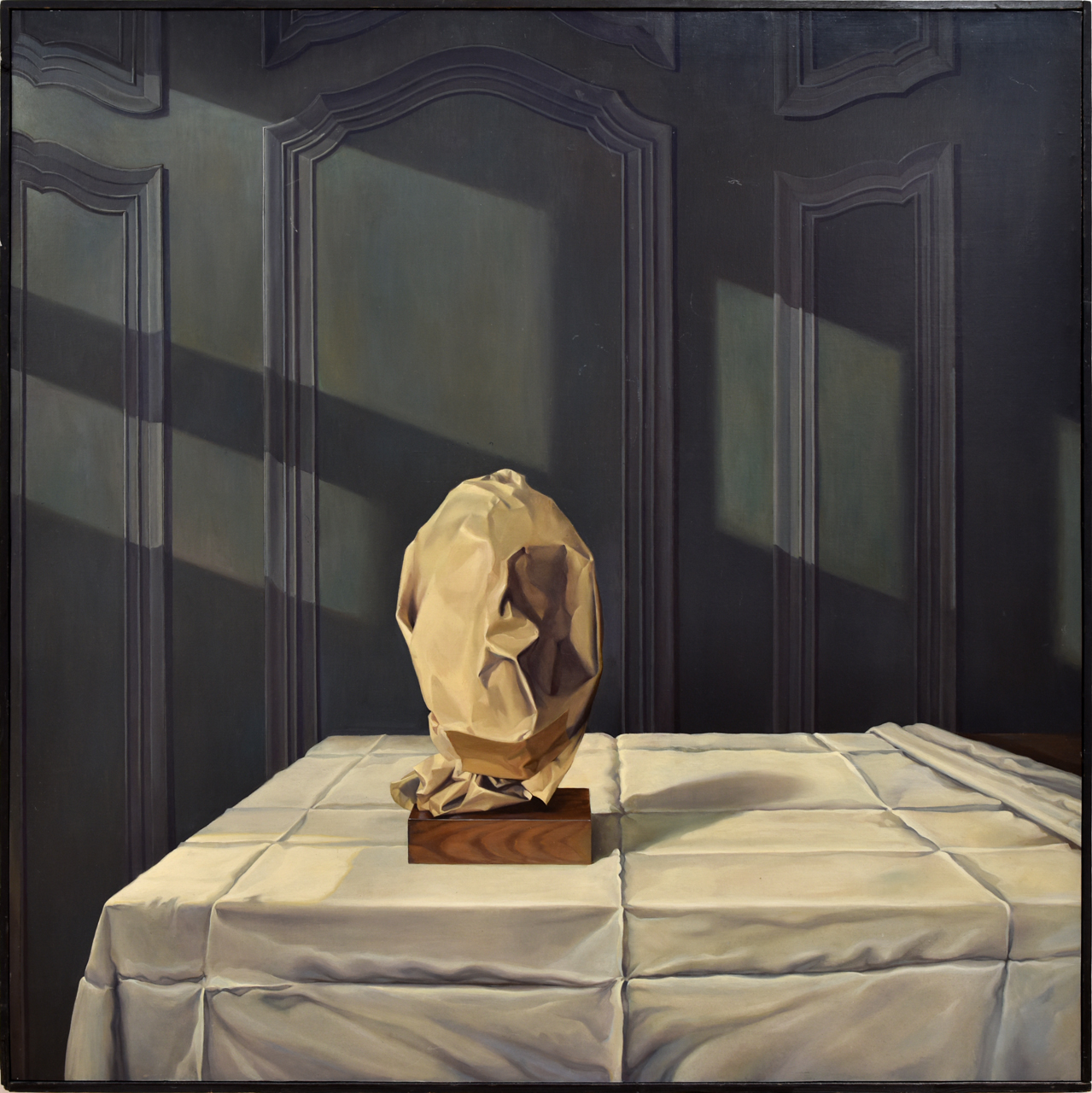
Self-Portrait by the Window I, 1981

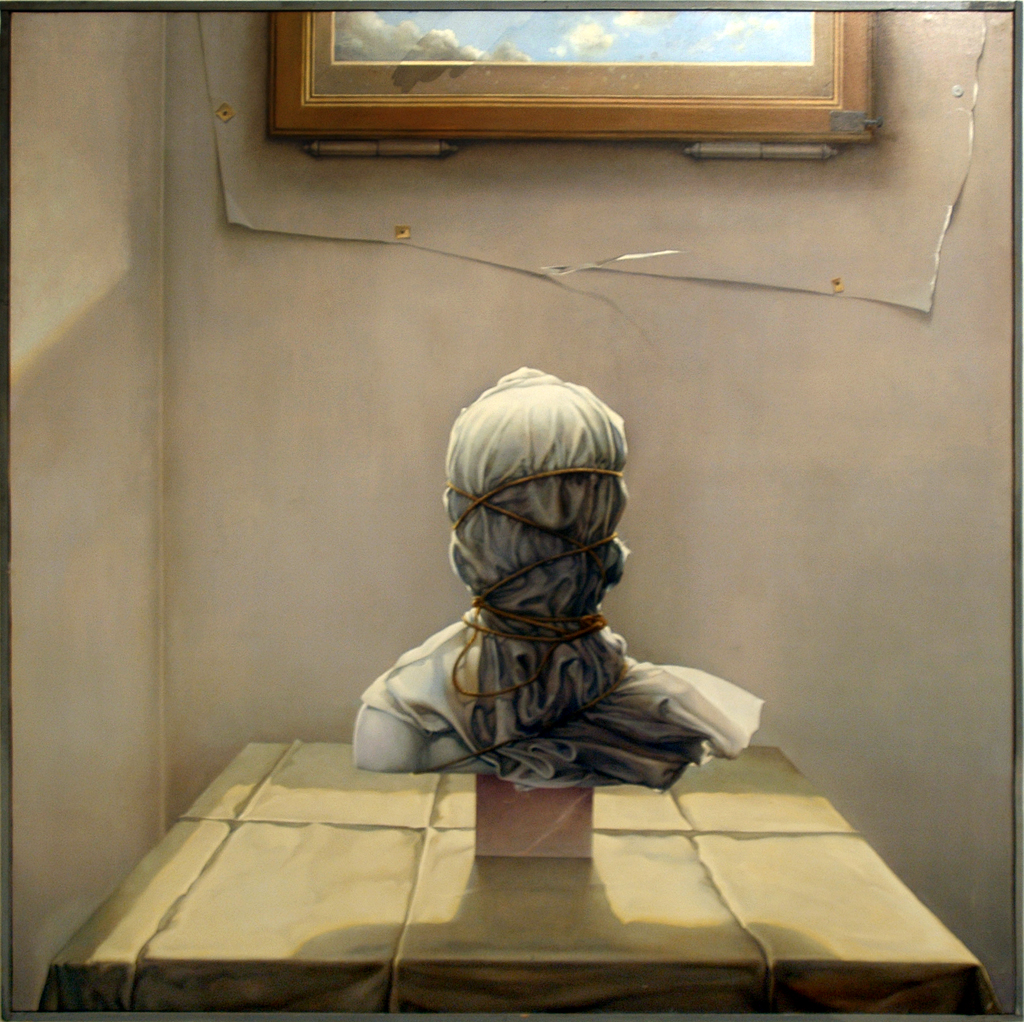
Self-Portrait by the Window II, 1981

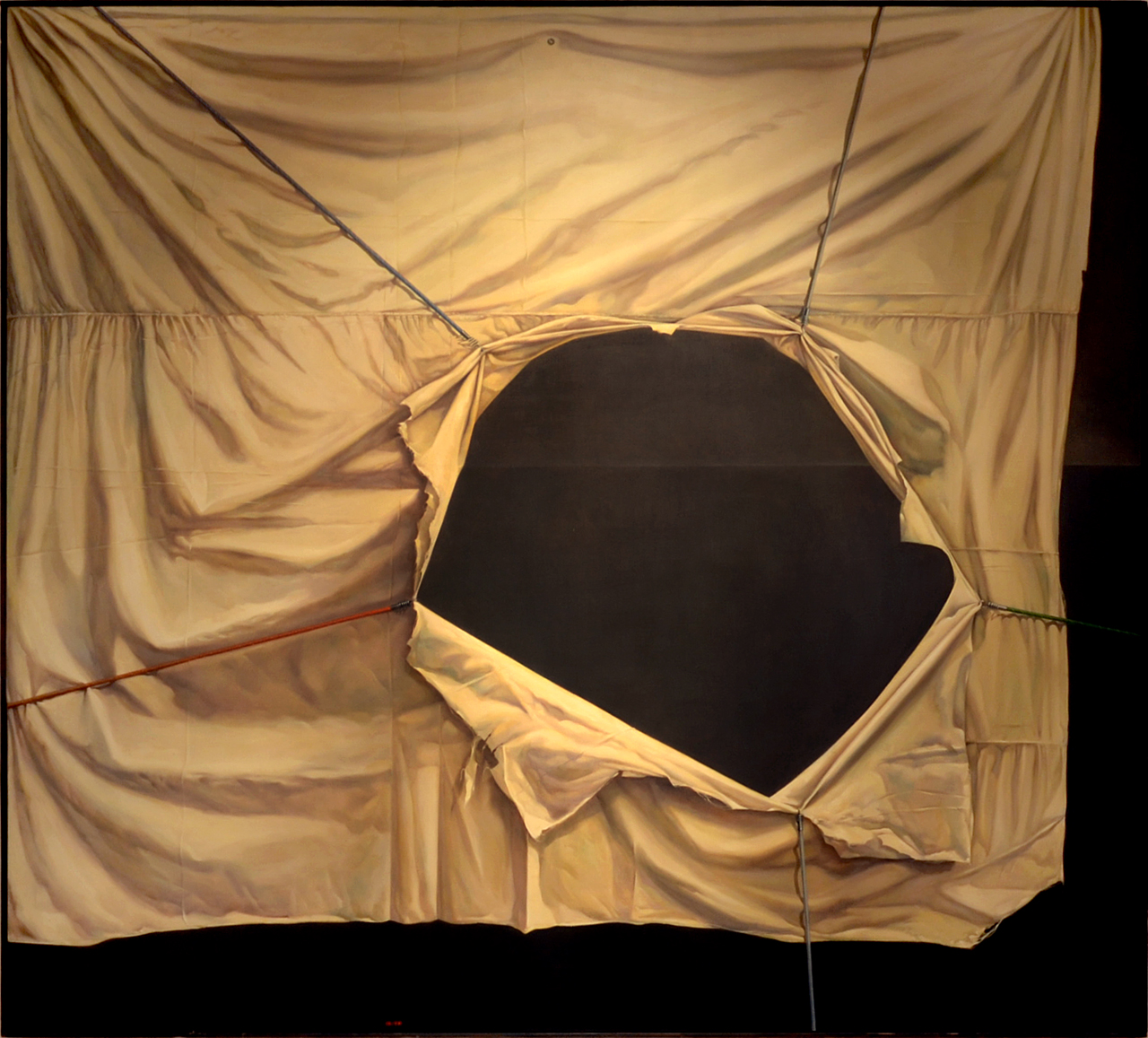
Czech Horizon, 1979

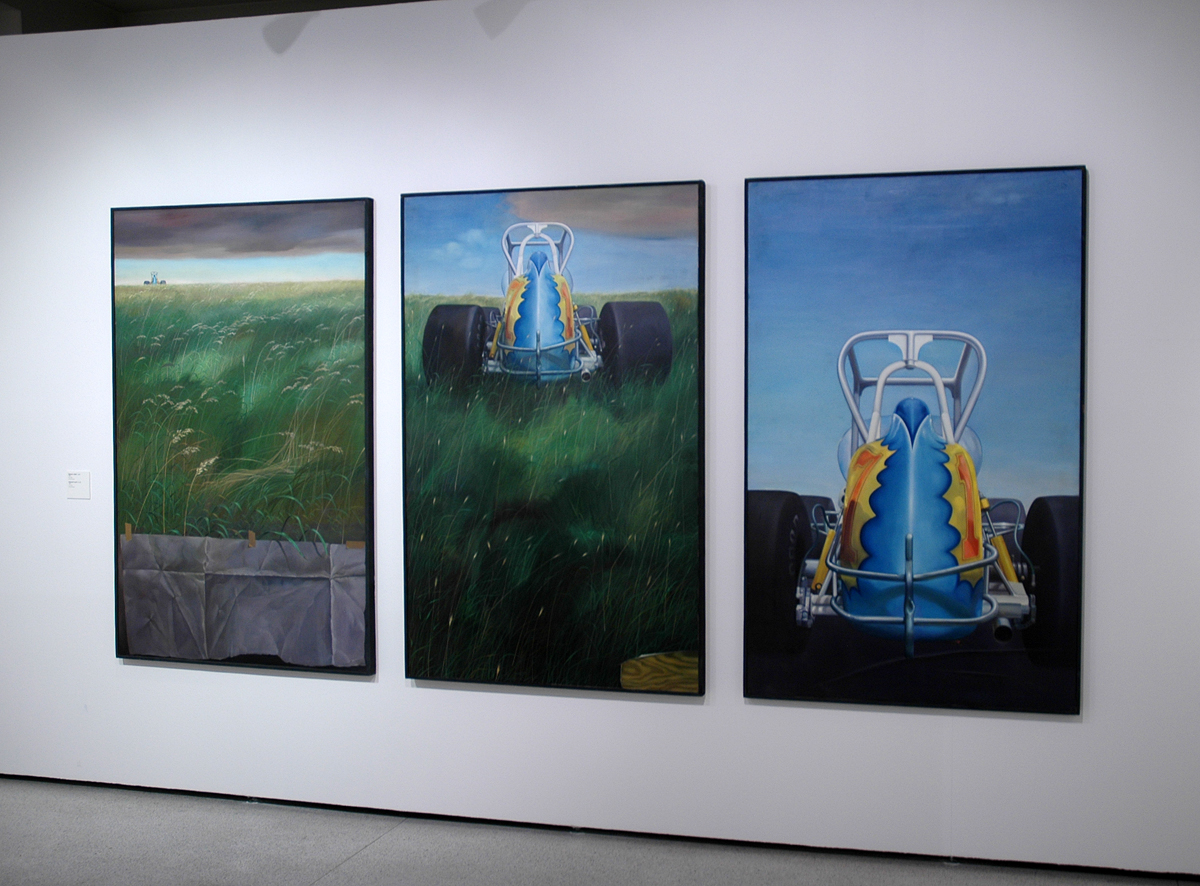
Farewell to Youth, 1981, installation, National Gallery Prague

Pištěk applied his mastery of trompe-l'œil to a series of paintings of gleaming automobile and motorcycle parts (Angelus, 1978; Gold Fever, 1978) or the impersonal objects that surround us (Tonca Still Life, 1981; Homage to Papin, 1981). Photography provided inspiration. This faithful hyperrealist depicting of the surface of things was not just an aesthetic phenomenon, but also a way for Pištěk to measure himself against other painters. Ultimately he came to resist his categorisation as a photorealist painter, instead describing his program as “Neo-Romanticism”. He did not want viewers to see only verism, illusion and perfection in his work, but to offset the modern cult of ugliness and hopelessness with a “new professionalism” that sought through flawless painting to evoke an atmosphere or recall a moment or story from the past that we had begun to doubt ever really happened.

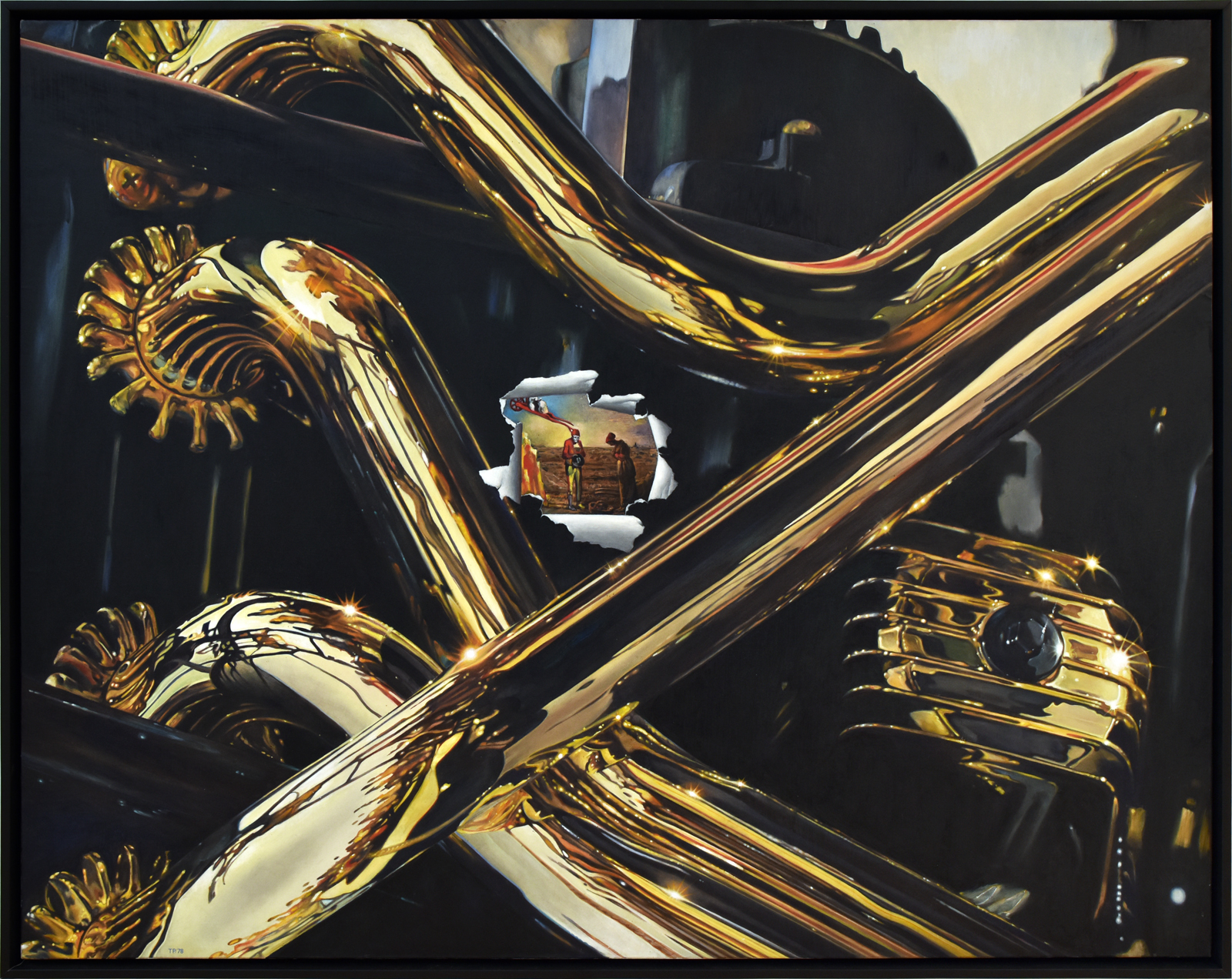
Angelus, 1978

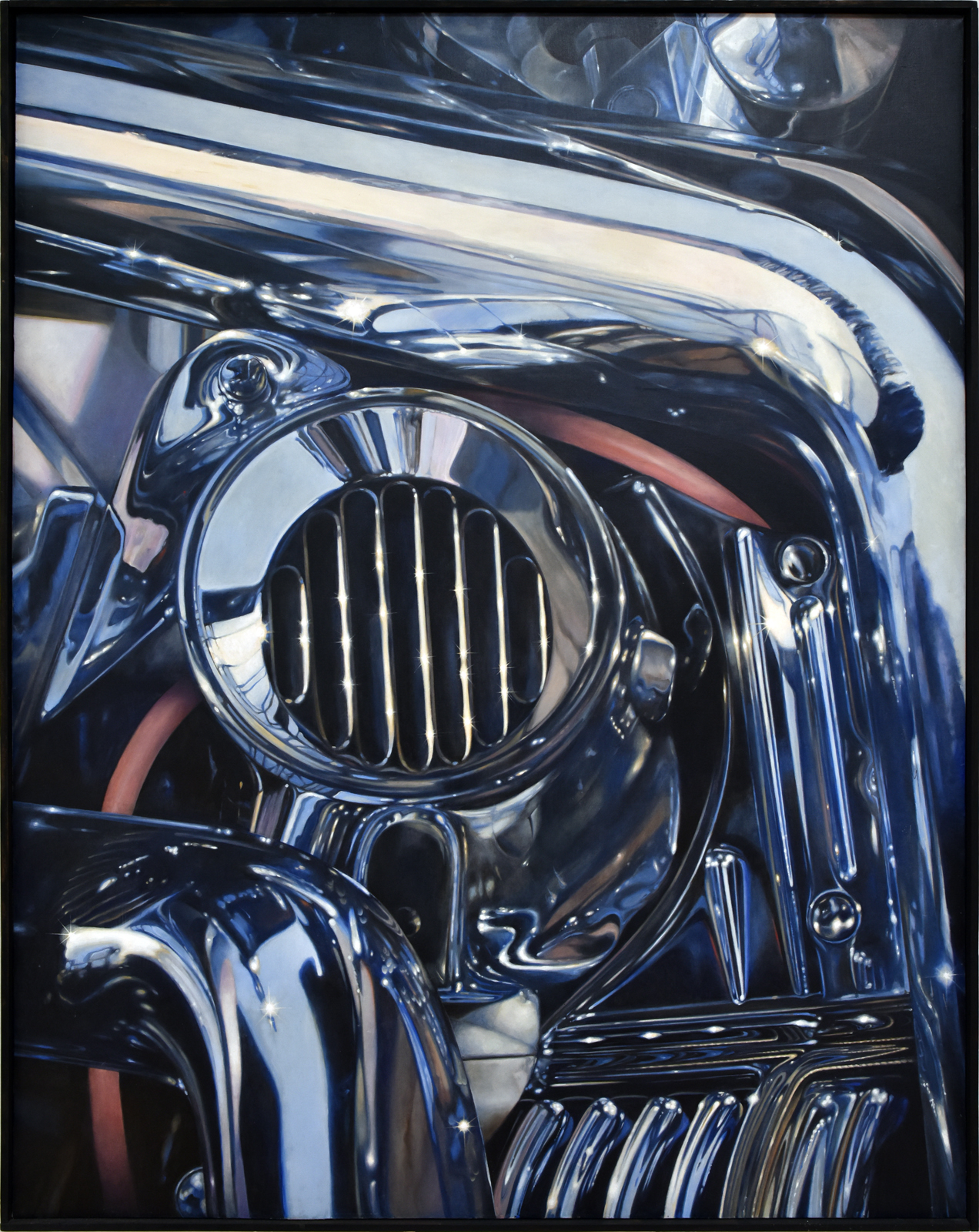
Passion 2, 1978

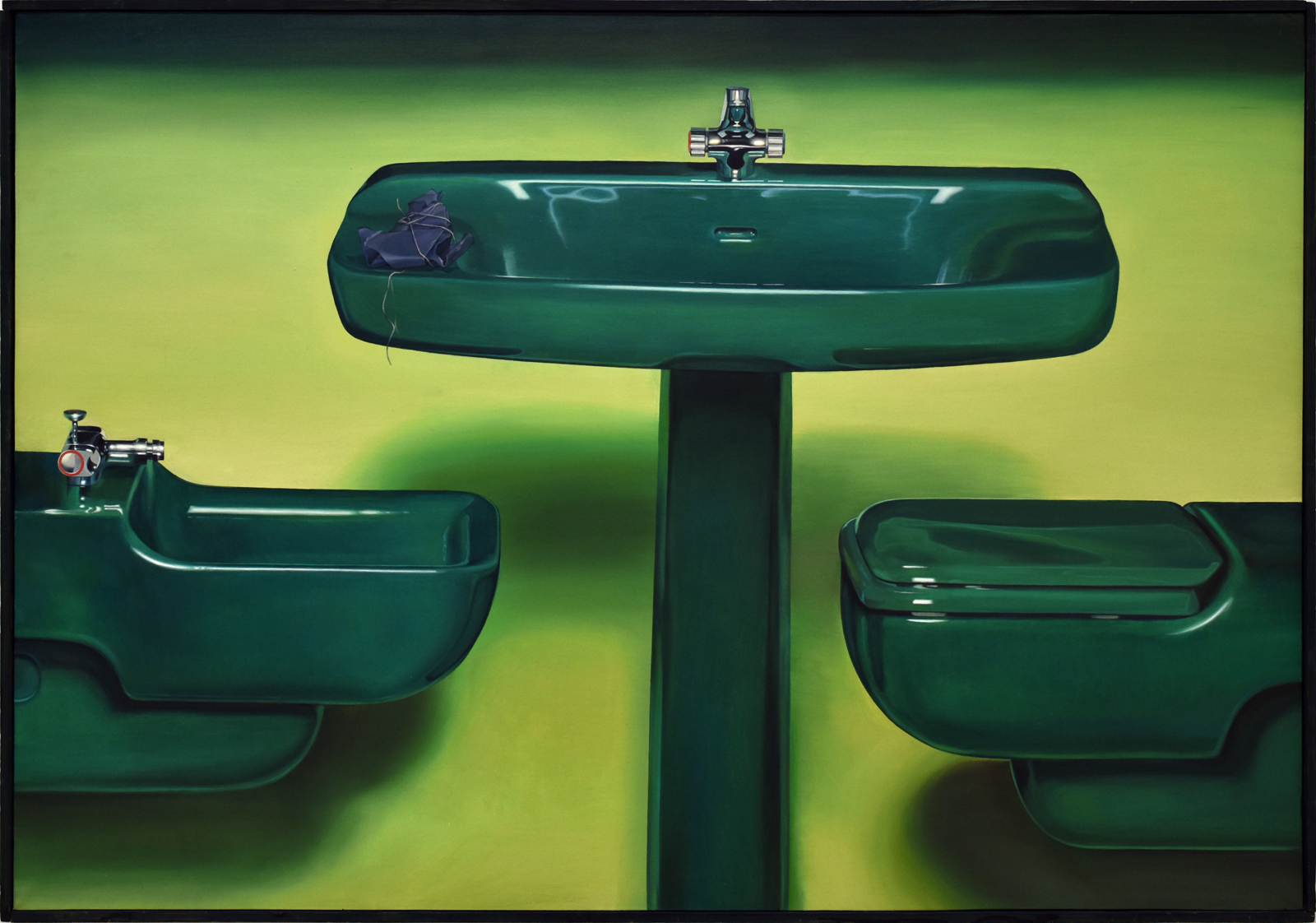
Tonca Still Life, 1981, GMA Hradec Králové

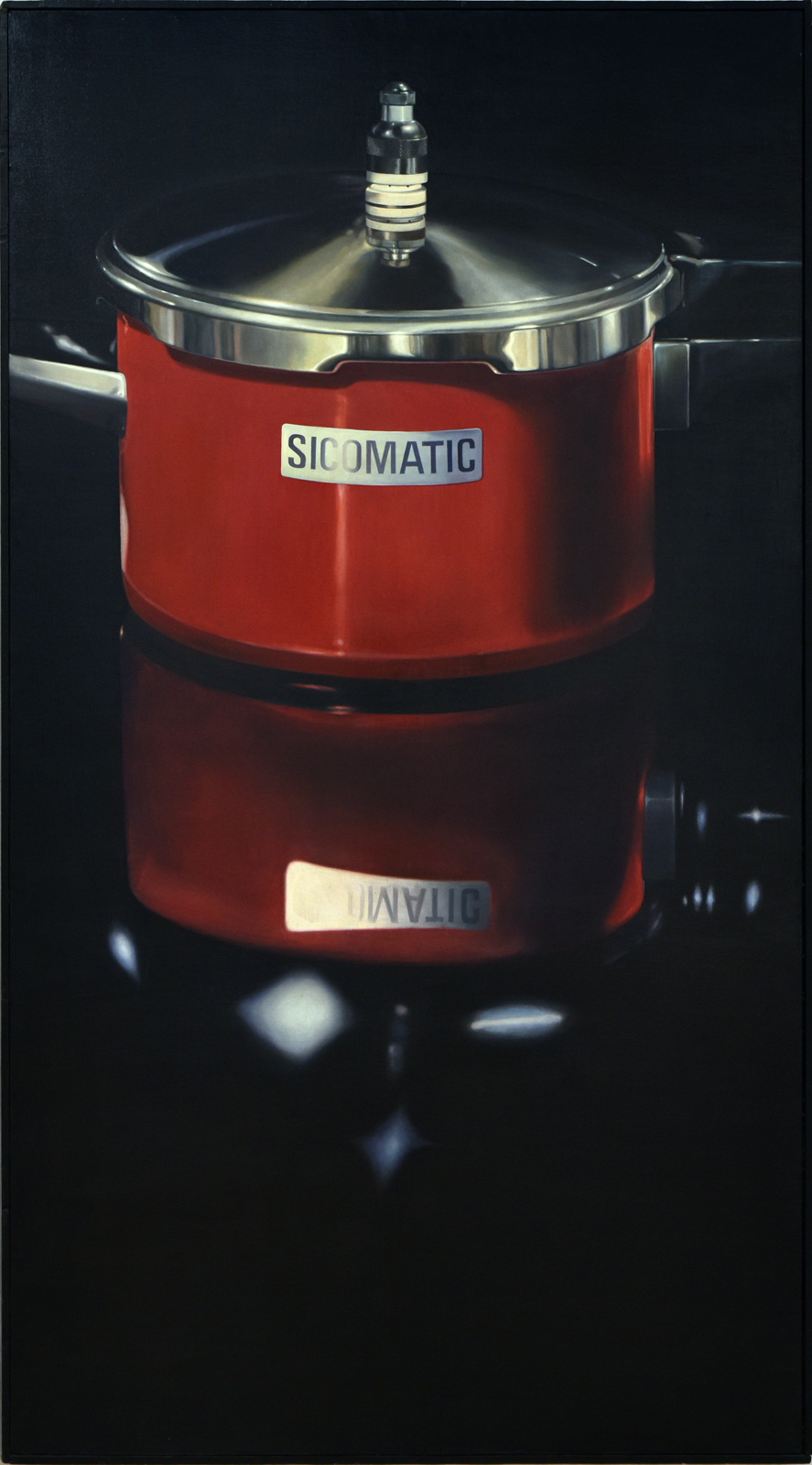
Homage to Papin, 1981, GA Karlovy Vary

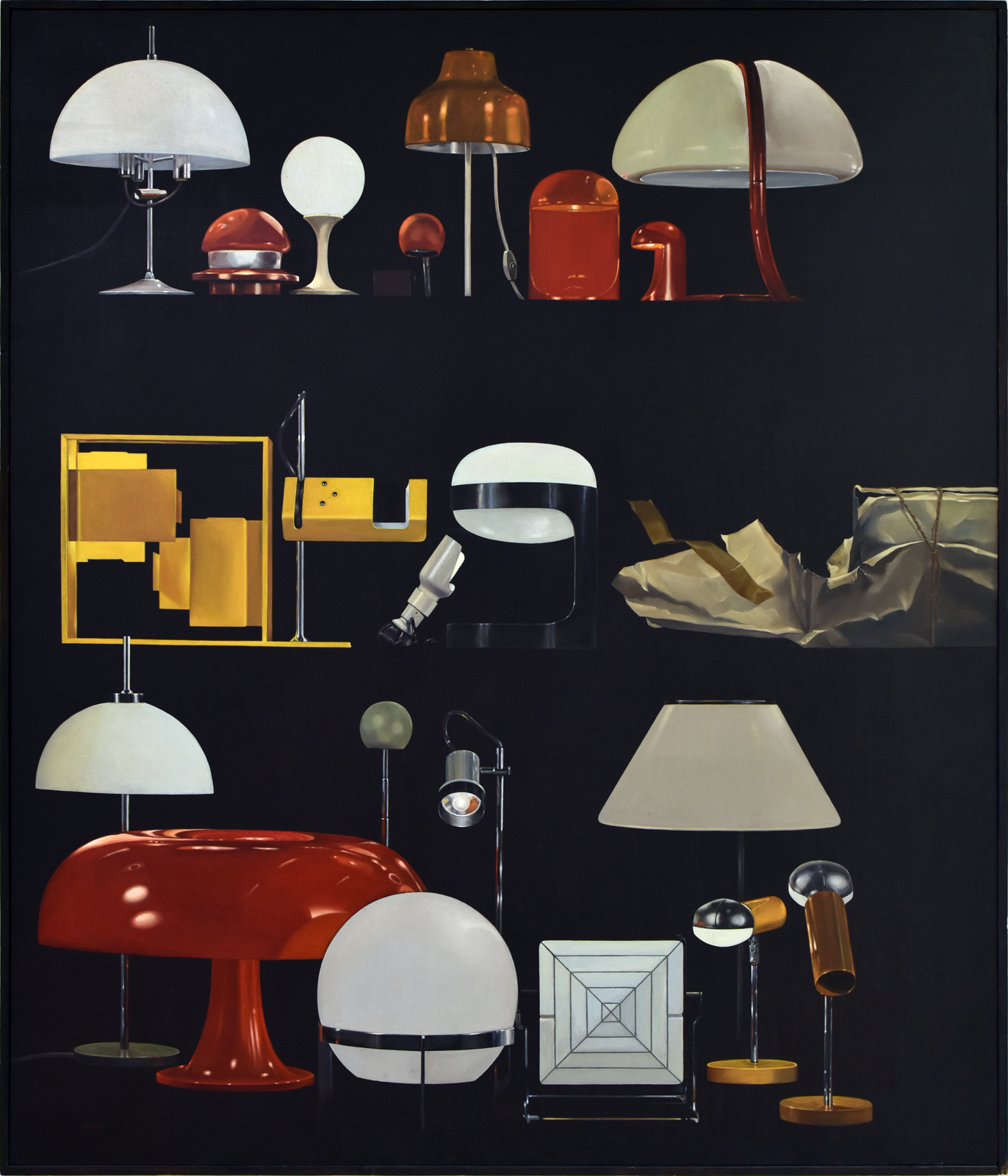
Still Life with Lamps, 1987

Pištěk's paintings from this period guide the viewer from sensory enchantment to seeking the mystery behind a painting. They were influenced by the film world in which he operated, and like film backdrops they created fictitious settings and brought new impulses into Czech modern art. Various disconnected narratives intersect (The Price of Elegance, 1973–1974; Landscape with a Honda, 1977), and the illusion of reality is constantly undermined by the painter's interventions. The minutely detailed and technically flawless illusionistic painting served to deceive the viewer's senses. A seemingly torn canvas is in fact intact (Ecce Homo, 1983); a collage with photographs glued on and scraps of paper held by drawing pins is only a fiction in a painting (Portrait of a Friend, 1976; Midget, 1977; D Day, H Hour, 1980). Paintings include references to other artists (Dalí in Self-Portrait; Millet in Angelus) and entirely personal messages such as digital numerals showing Pištěk's date of birth in an apparently torn canvas he created for his fiftieth birthday (From My Life, 1982).

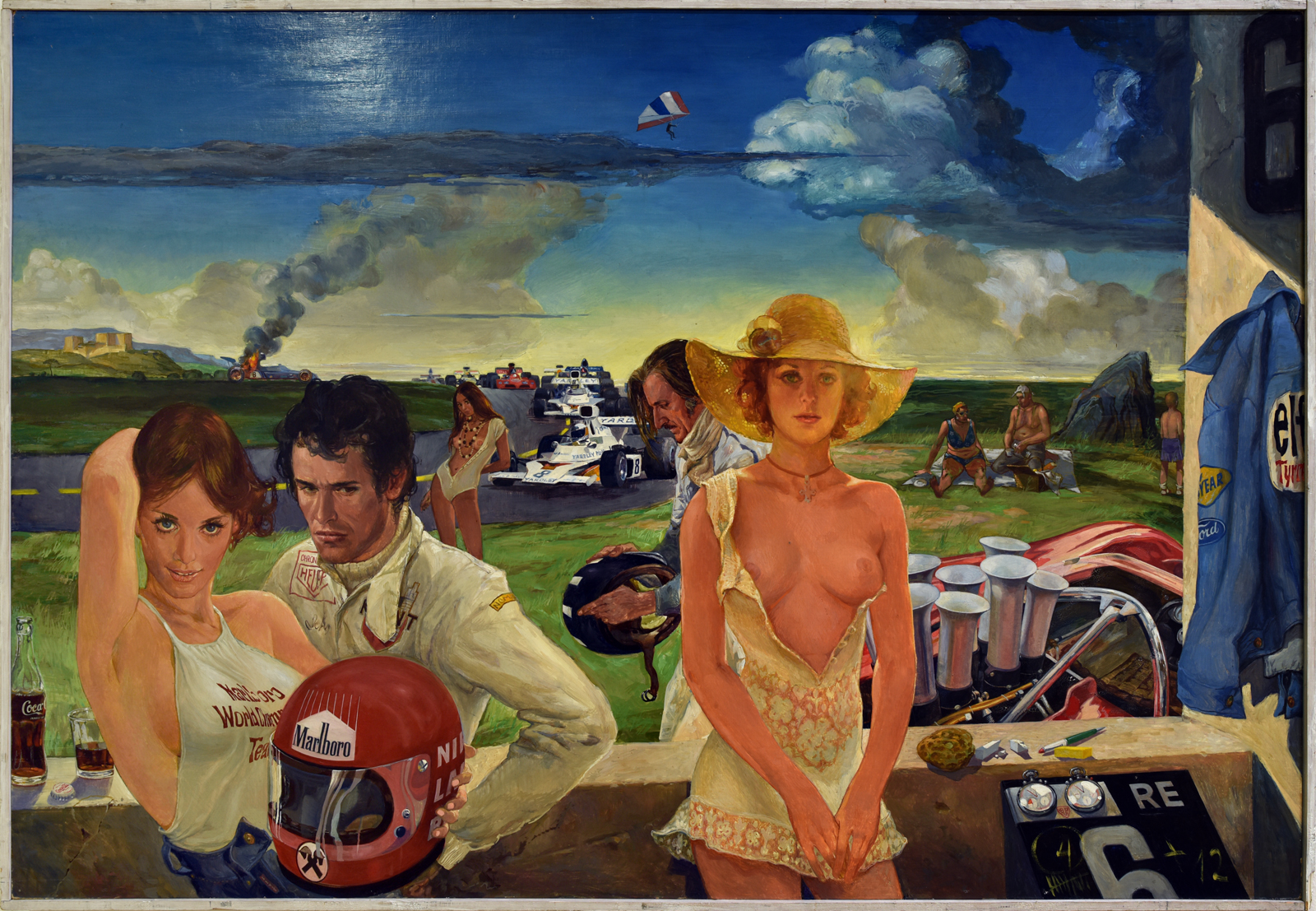
Big Landscape, 1976, AJG Hluboká

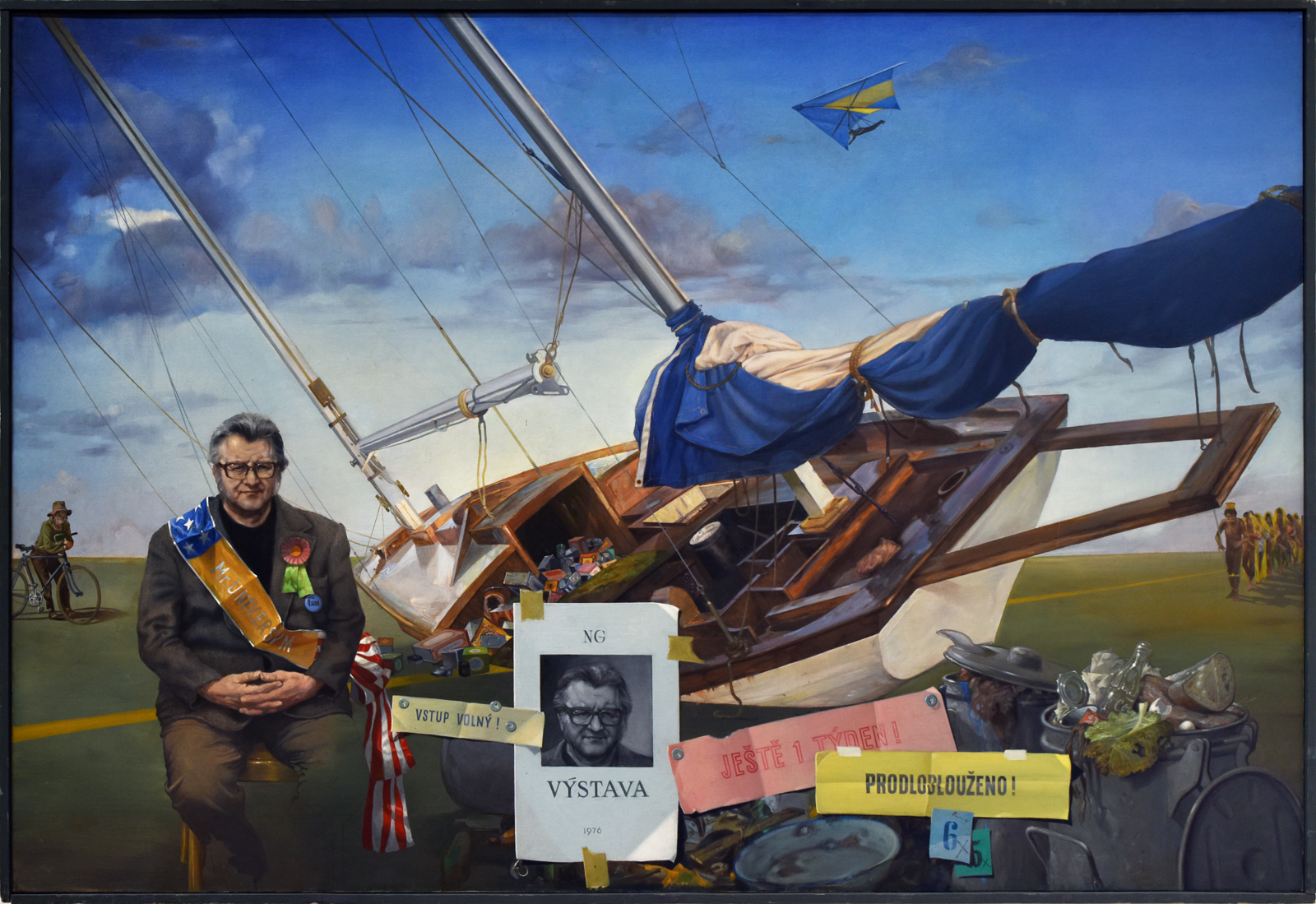
Portrait of a Friend, 1976, AJG Hluboká

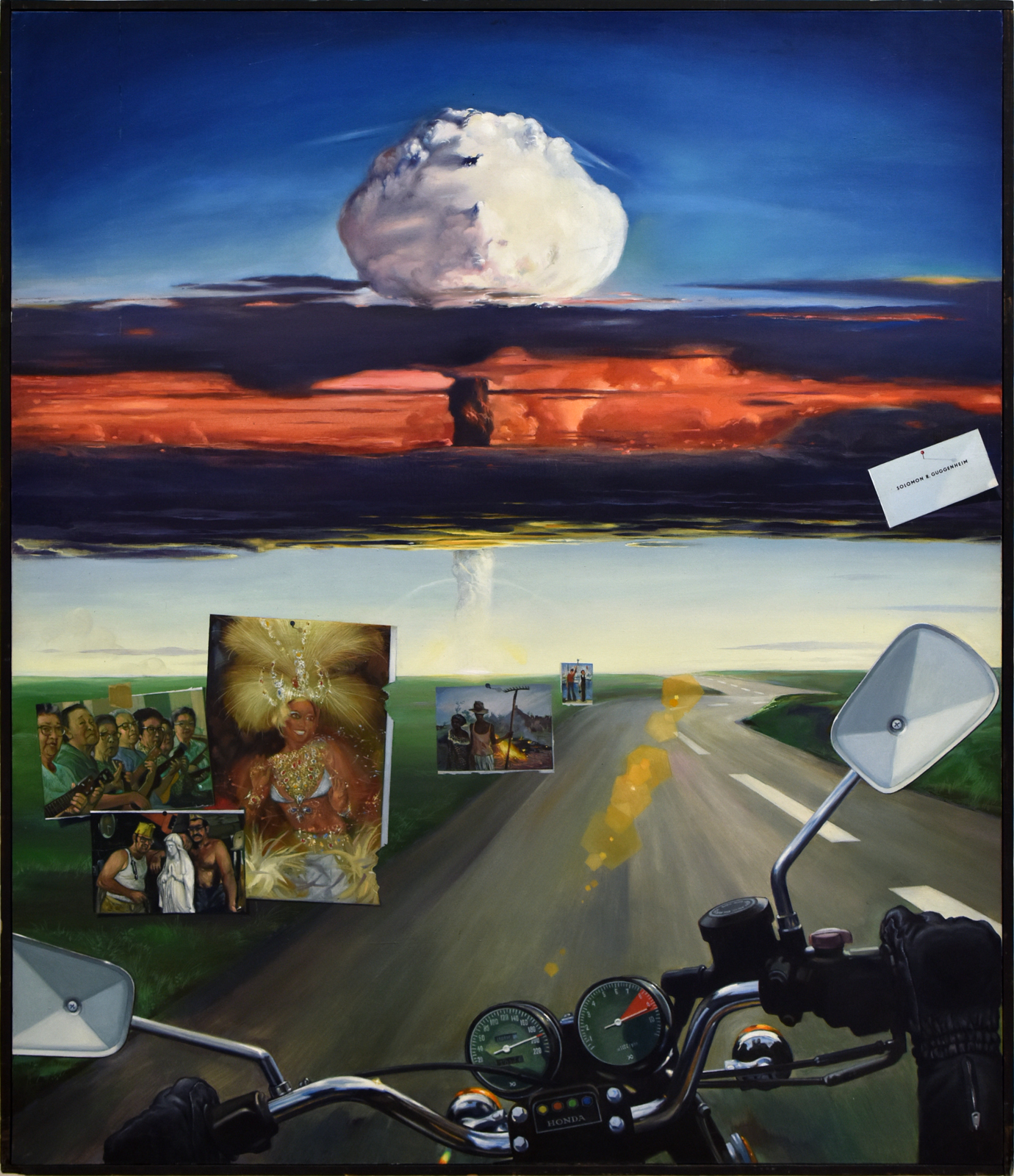
Landscape with a Honda, 1977, AJG Hluboká

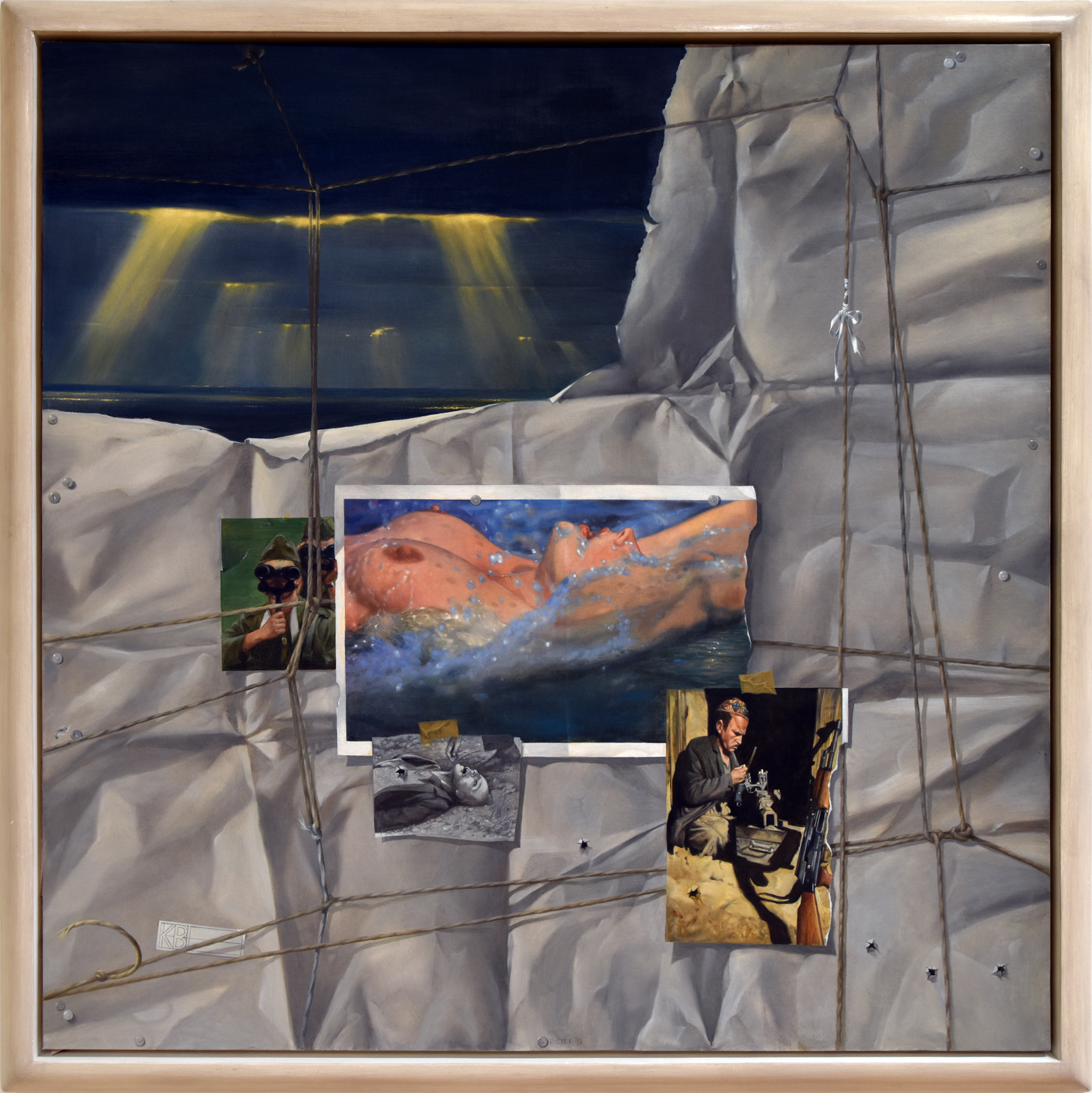
From Life, 1977

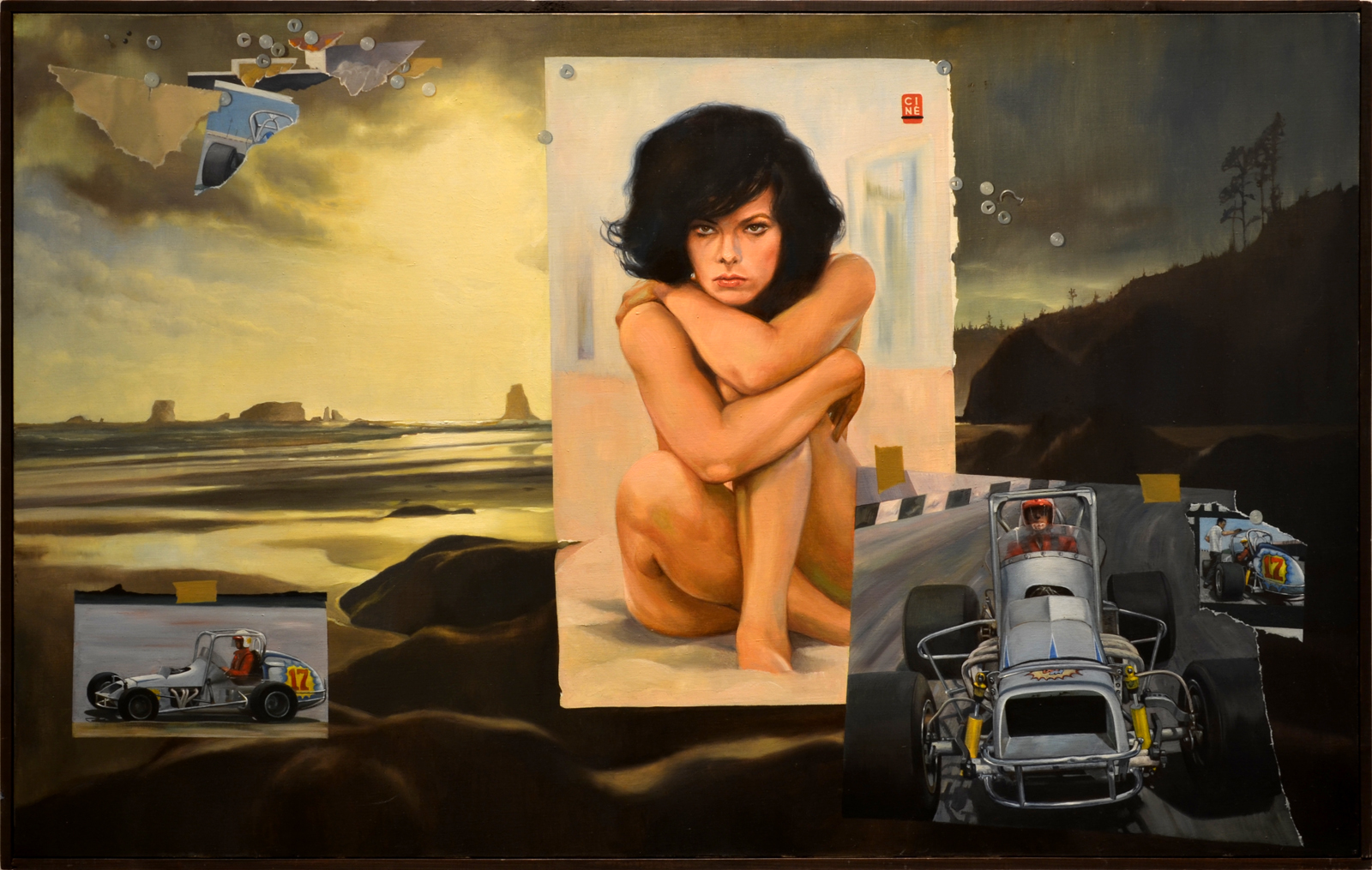
Midget, 1977

Pištěk has repeatedly returned to Biblical themes. His Joseph wears overalls and is depicted sitting on a wooden plank as he rolls a cigarette. This scene of Joseph in his carpentry workshop is rendered as a torn poster that seems to have been tacked to a second picture plane showing a sports car; several nails have fallen out of the poster. The corner of the picture of the car has also been ripped off to reveal the background: a blue sky with a little cloud (Joseph N, 1978). Ecce Homo (1983) shows a racing driver in a balaclava as a modern paraphrasing of the Man of Sorrows. The cross has been replaced with an exploded view of an engine in the background, Christ's wounds are symbolised by illusionistic cuts painted over the driver's hands, and the canvas looks as if it has been slashed in reference to the scourging of Christ. The Last Supper (1983) cycle of paintings, a number of variations on a vacant table in front of a window with a view of an empty landscape, presents another of Pištěk's themes: a dead, empty space devoid of people, which creates tension by referring to a familiar narrative to which nothing more can be added.

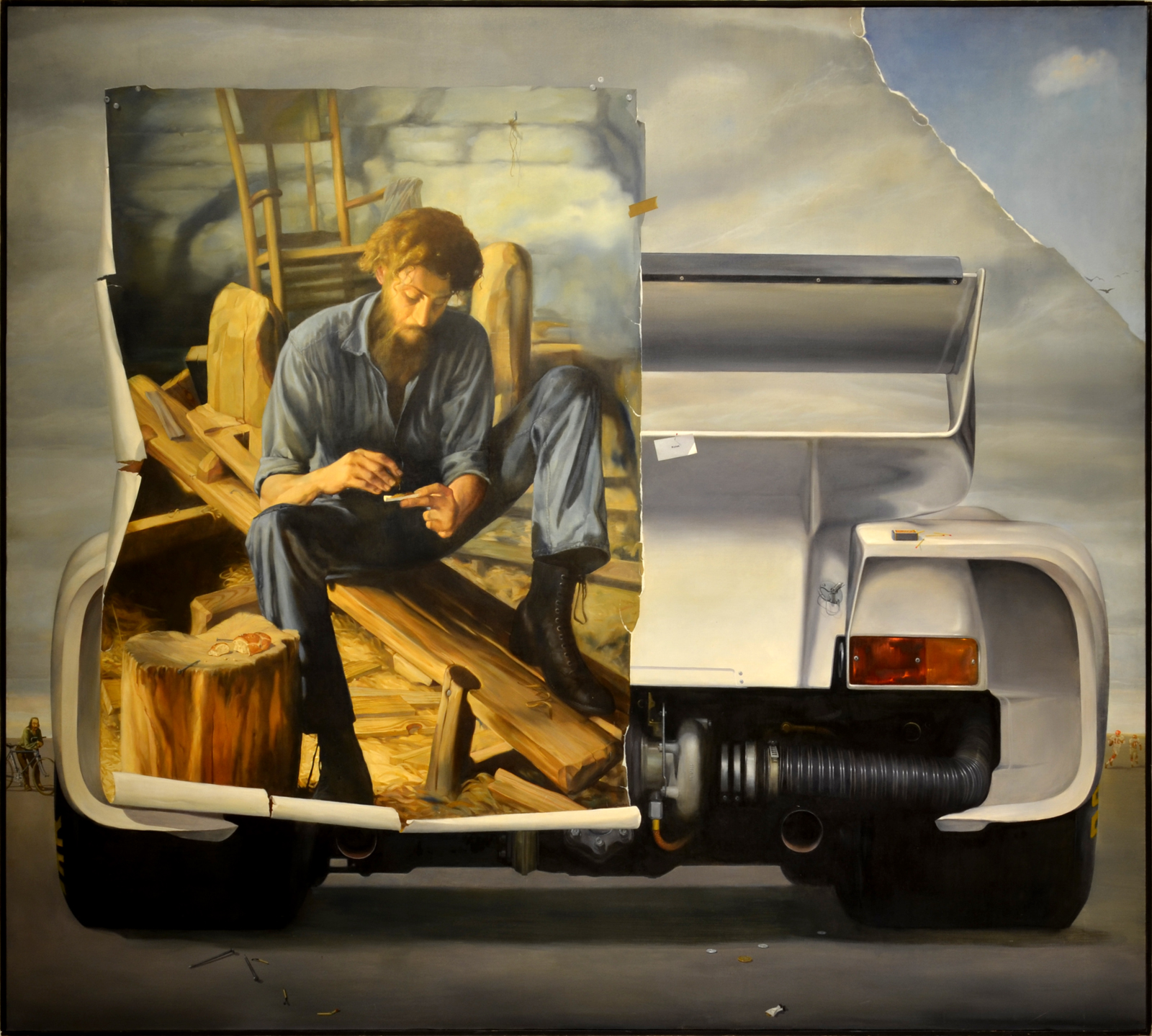
Josef N., 1978

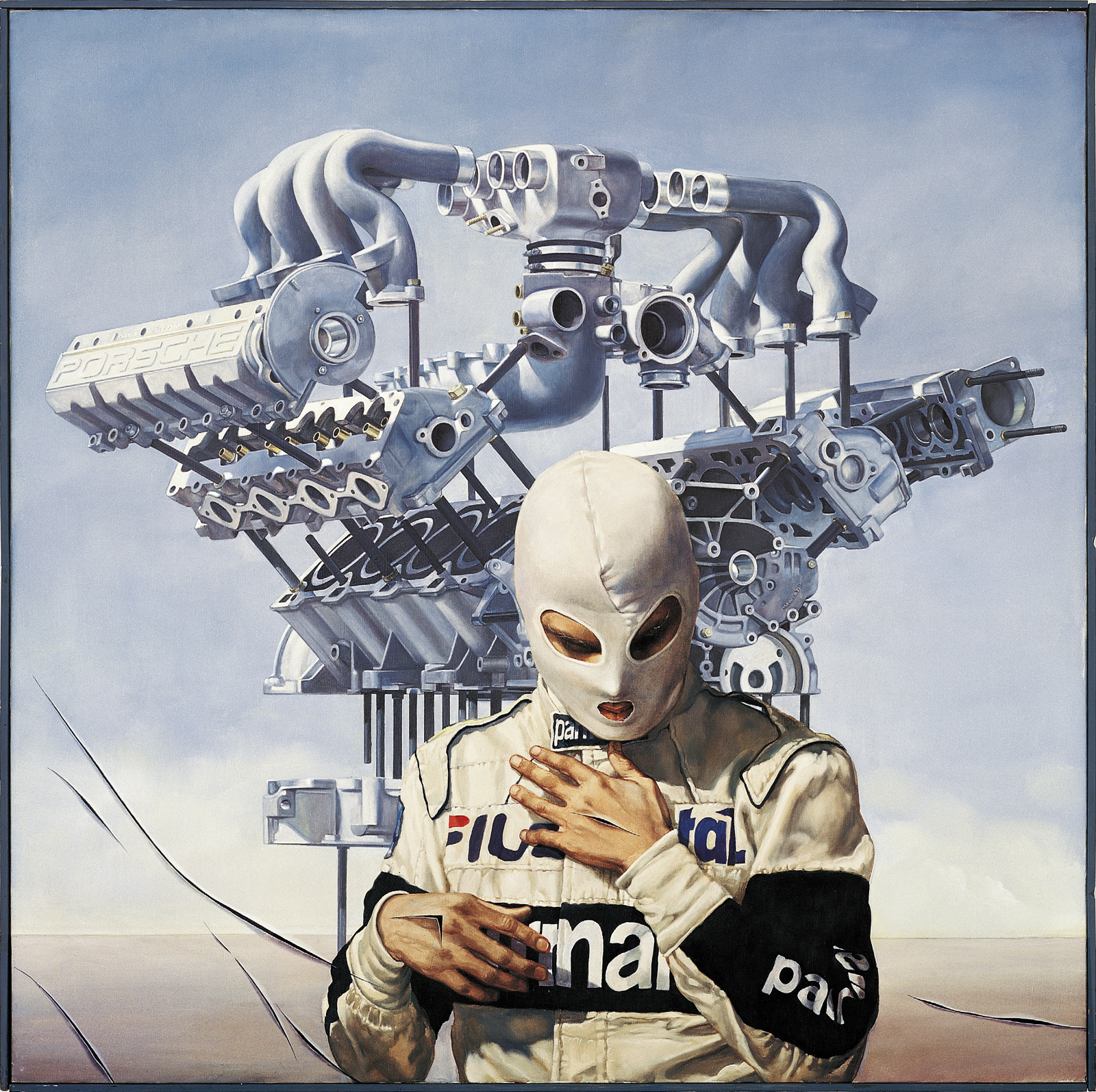
Ecce Homo, 1983

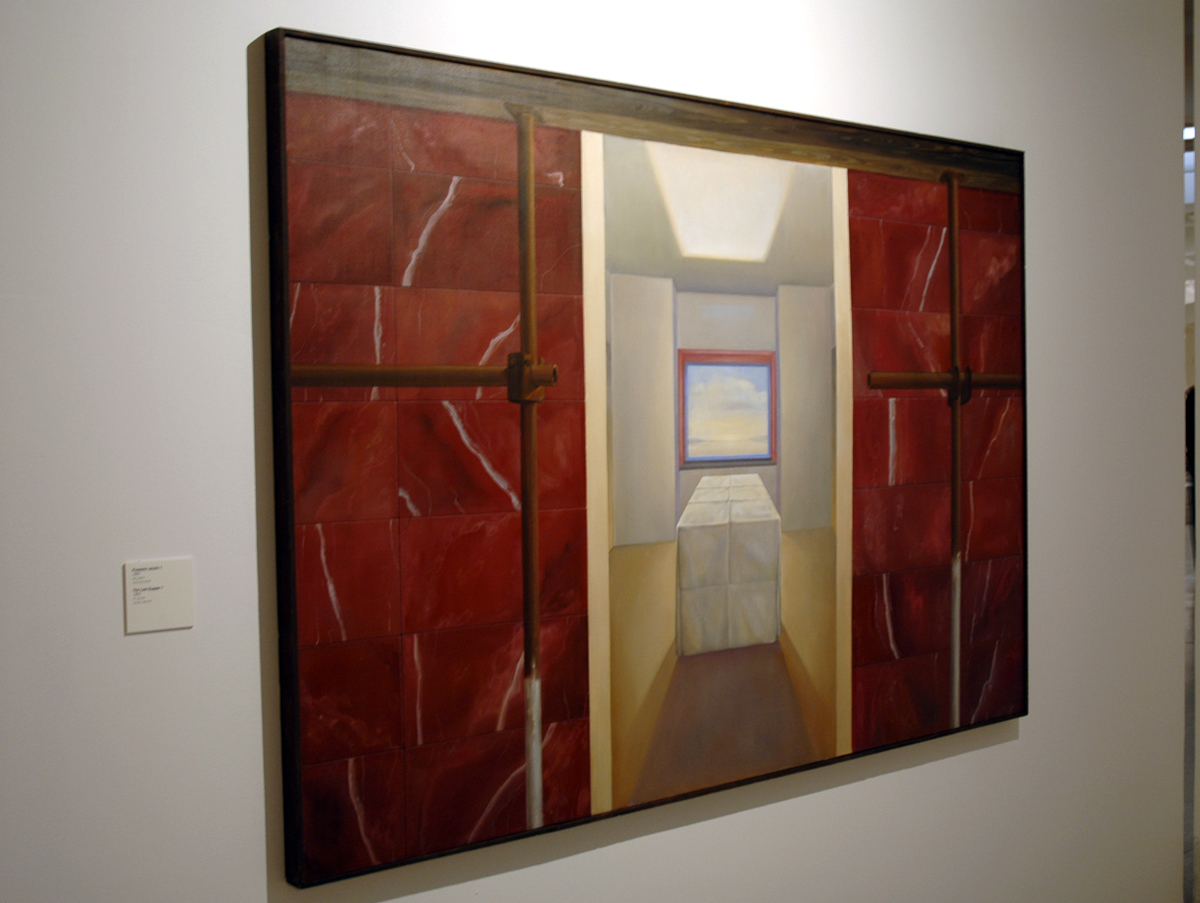
The Last Supper, installation at the National Gallery Prague, 2012

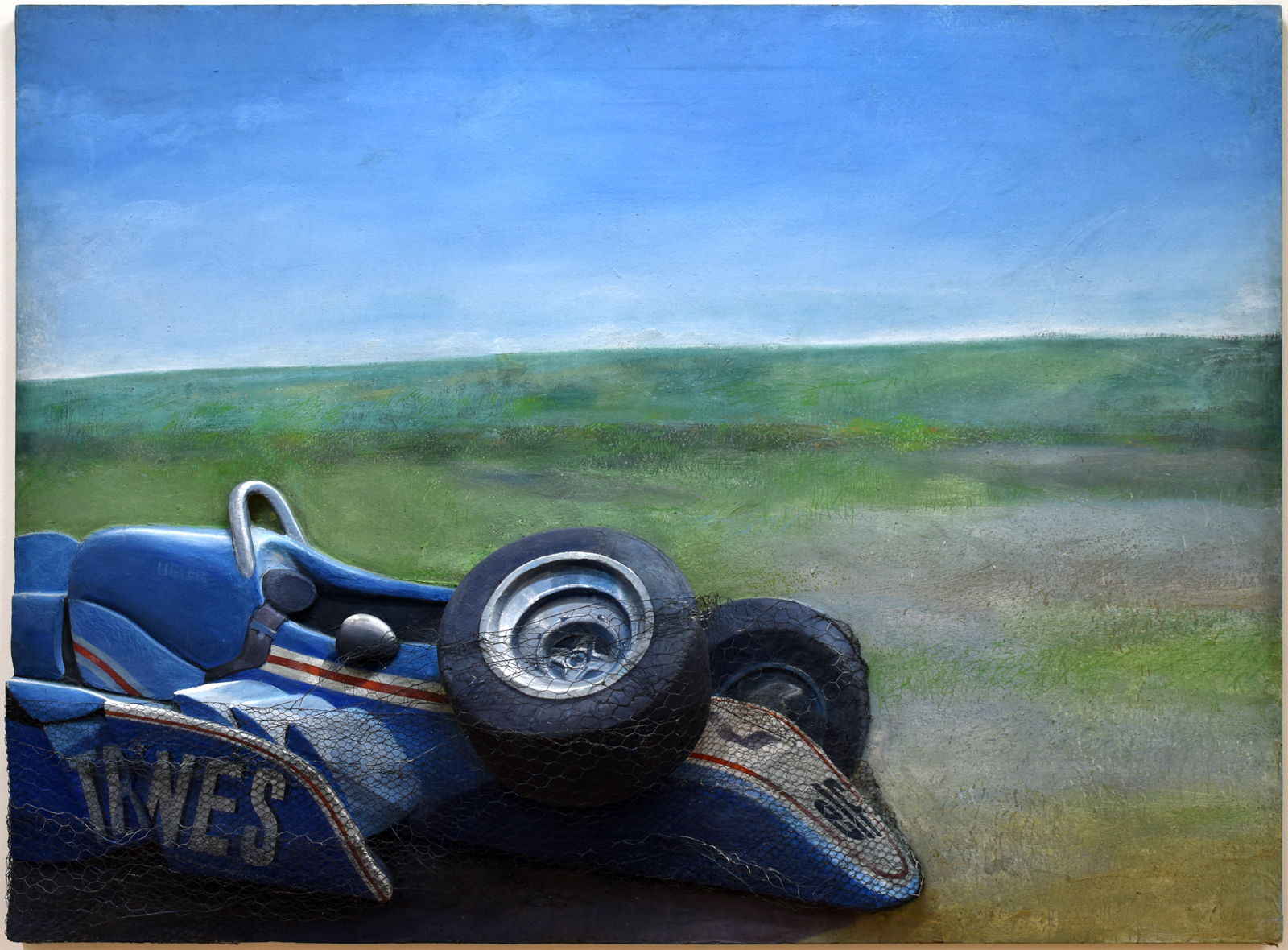
Silent Landscape, 1984, National Gallery Prague

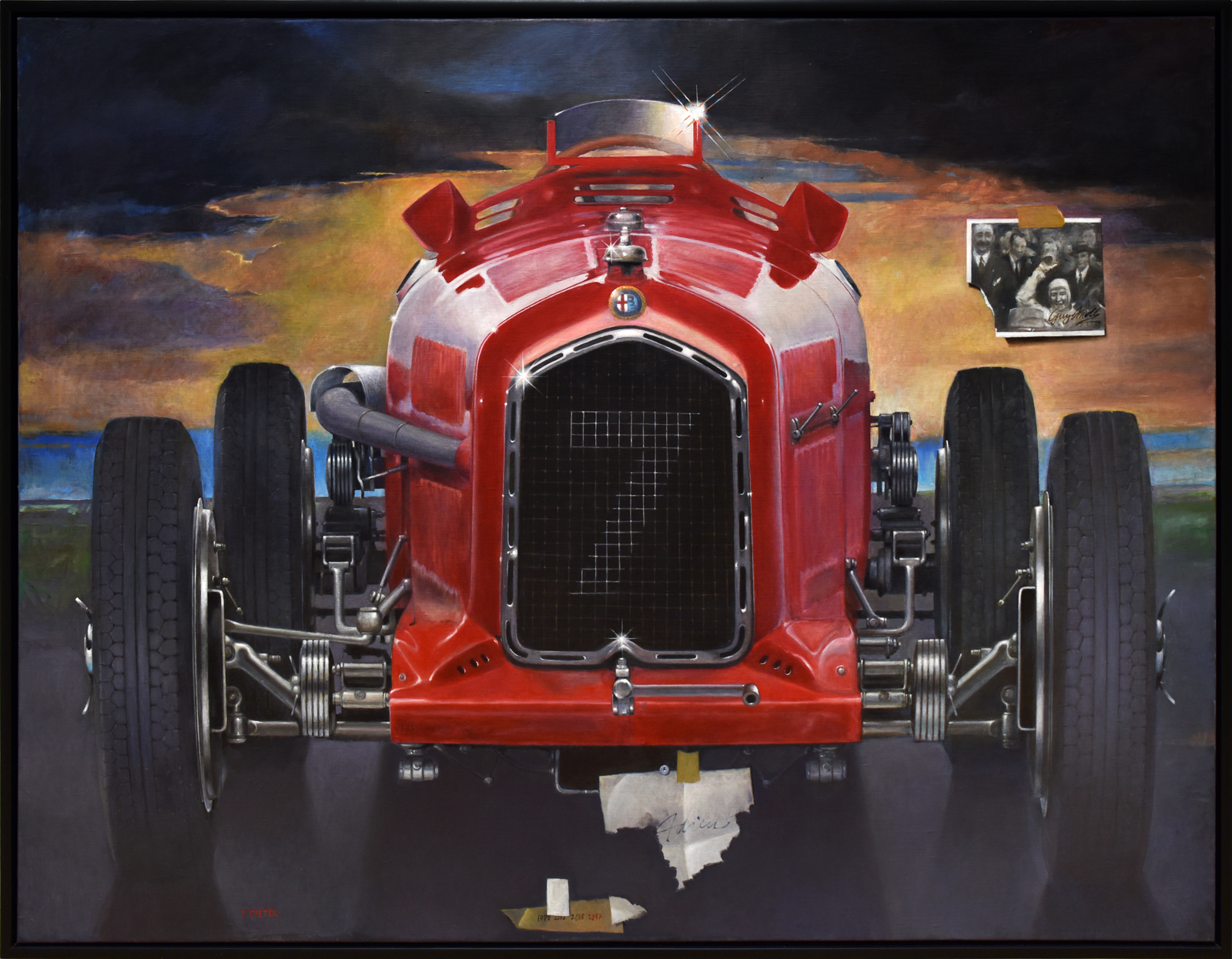
Adieu, Guy Moll (1992–2017)

Since the turn of the 1980s and 90s, Pištěk's paintings have included architecture that recalls film sets (Variations on a Given Theme 1–3, 1989). In the mid-90s Theodor Pištěk returned to geometrical abstraction in his paintings of empty and stylised architecture, where he worked with various kinds of false perspectives and lighting (Variations 1–6, 1995–1996; Building 1–2, 1995; Down 1–2, 1996; Column, 1997). The illusion produced in two dimensions is both magnified and contradicted by the impression of a tangible mass emerging from the picture plane and simultaneously guided along lines into the depth of the painting, where it surprisingly loses its shadow and the concrete becomes abstract. “My work moves in spirals, always beginning with the details and gradually freeing itself from them. The image becomes empty and is simplified to the minimum.”

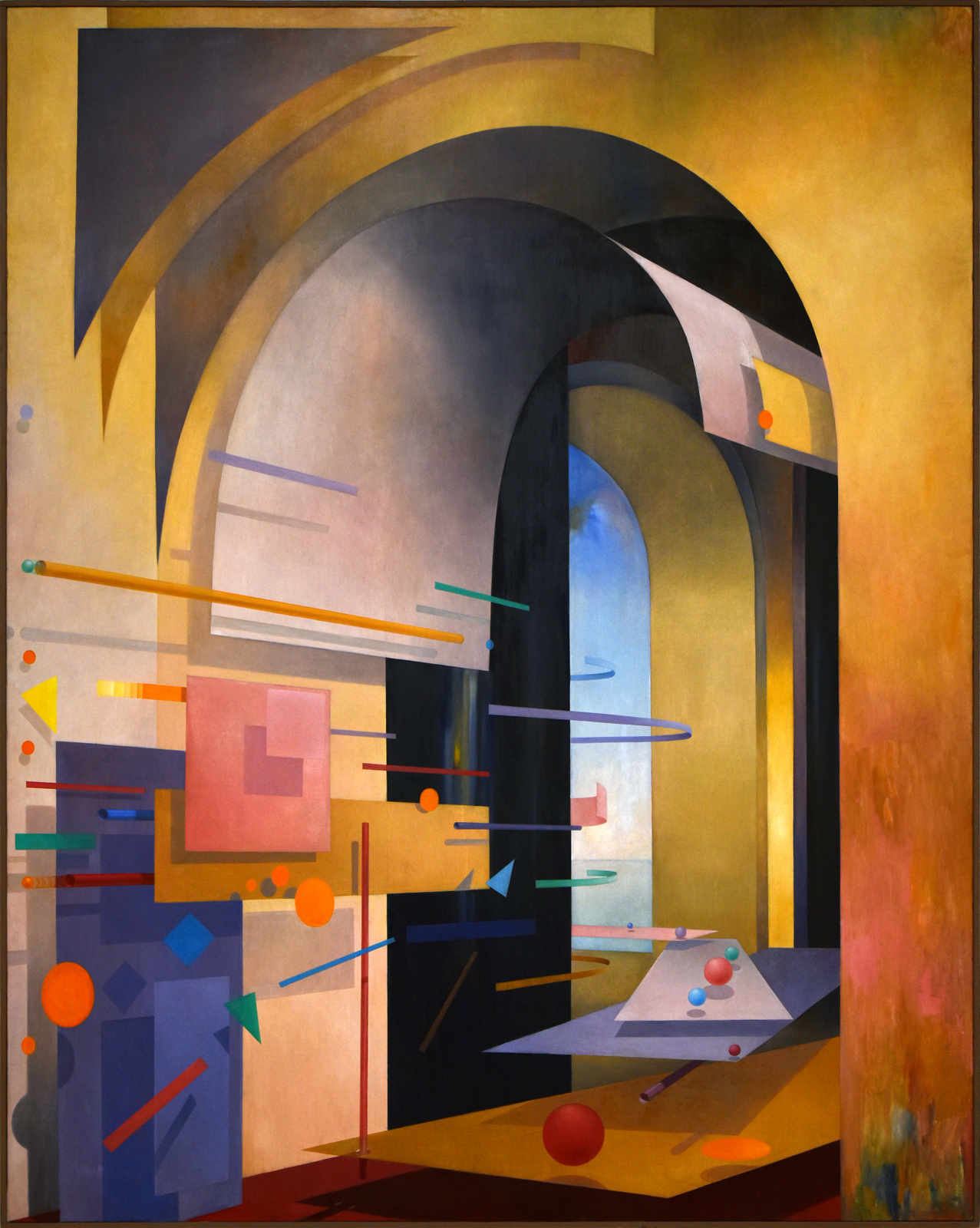
Party with Plečnik, 1992–1993

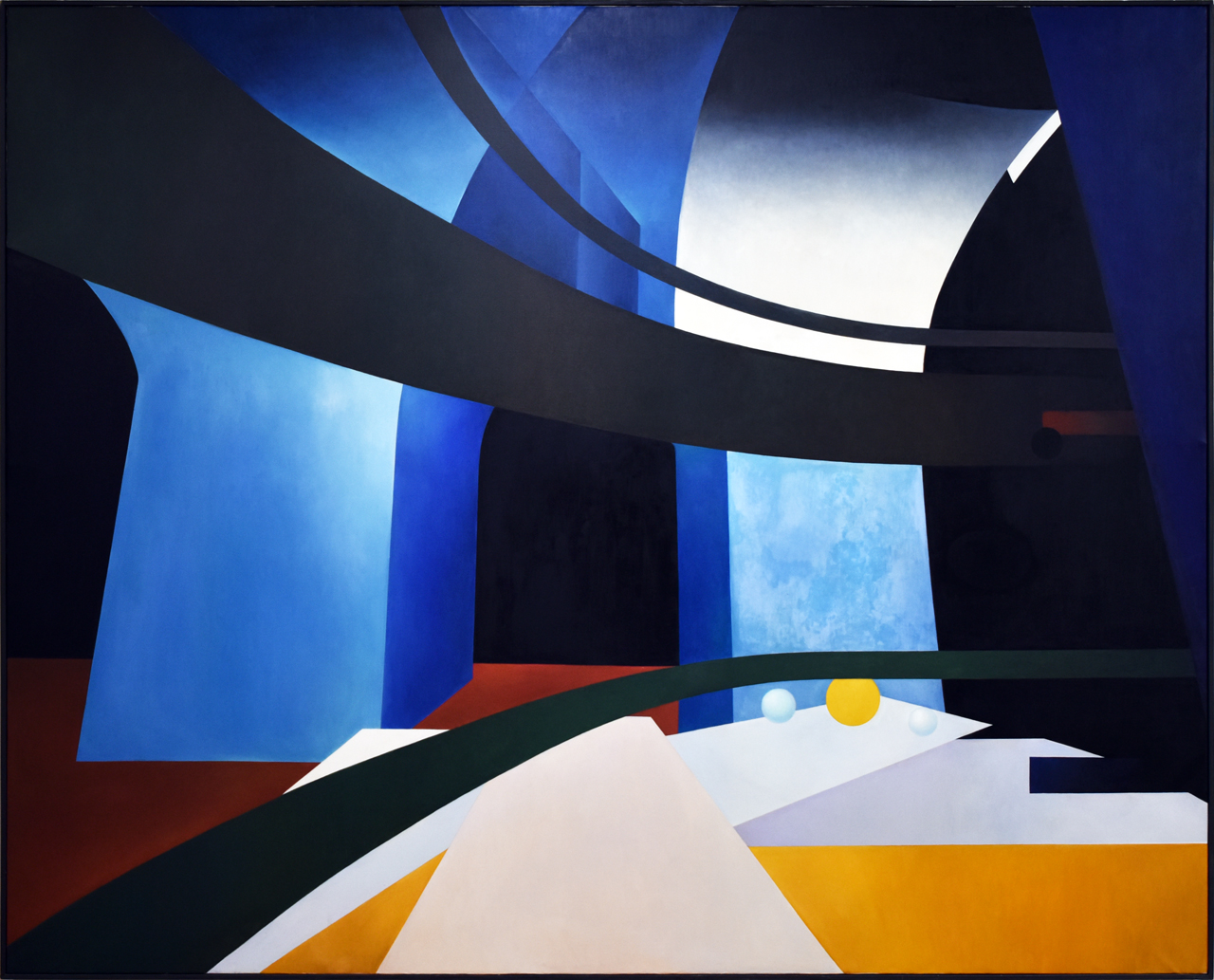
Variation No. 1, 1995

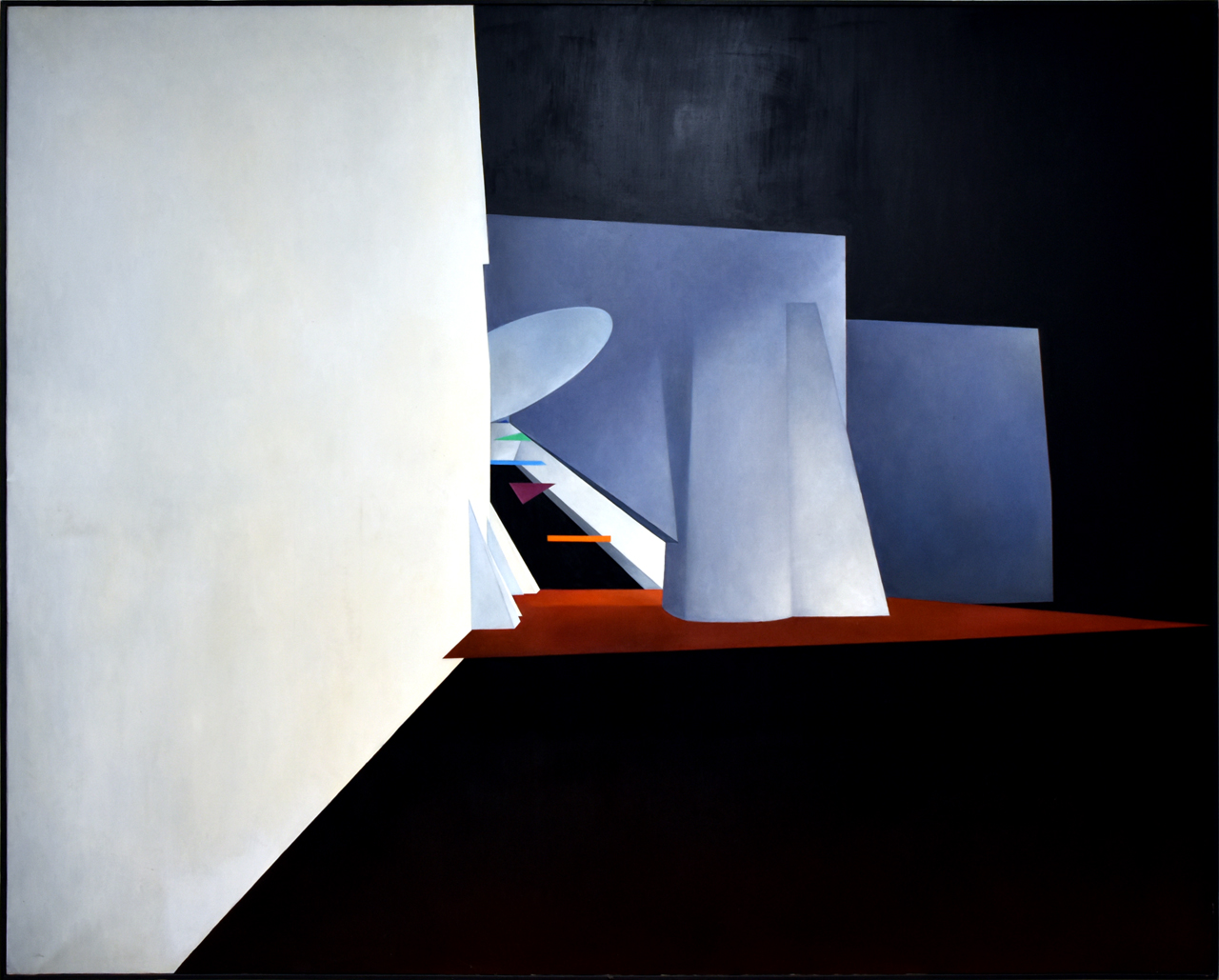
Construction No. 1, 1995

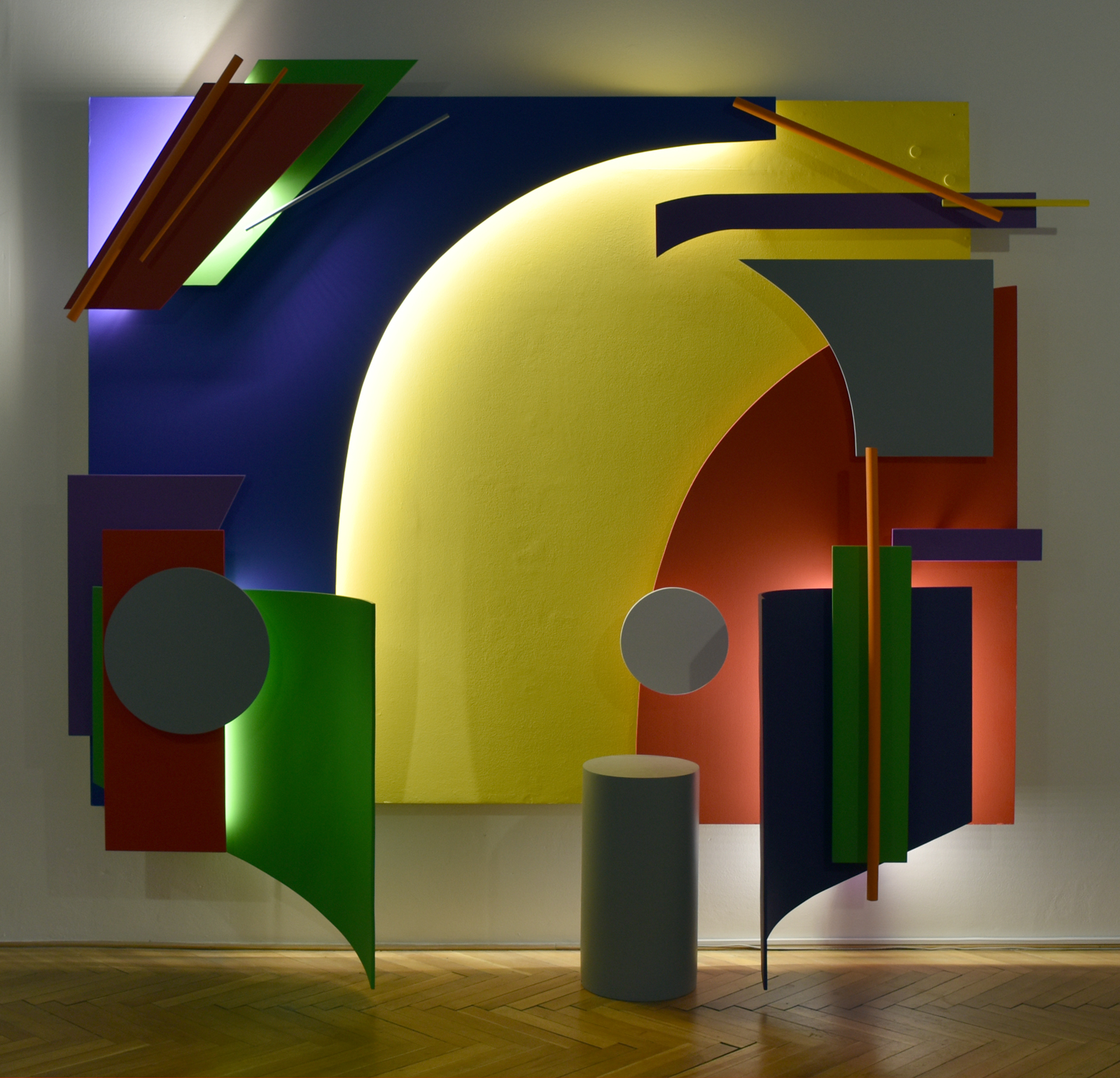
For Little Caroline, 1997–2019

Pištěk's contemplative Conversations with Hawking (2005–2019) are fragile geometrical constructions that delineate areas of black space interwoven with spot heights and marks indicating the motion of heavenly bodies.

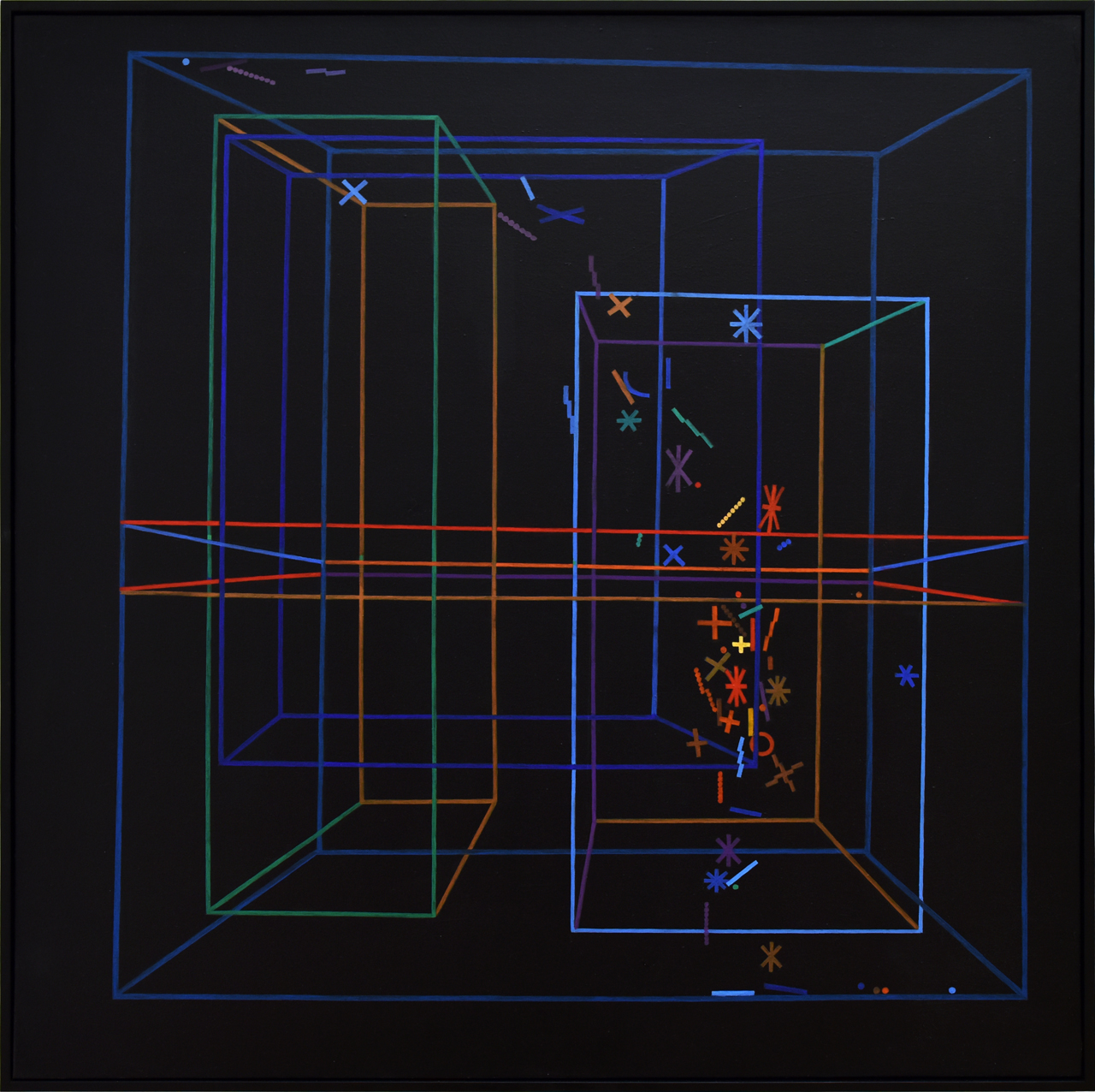
Conversations with Hawking 1b, 2005–2006

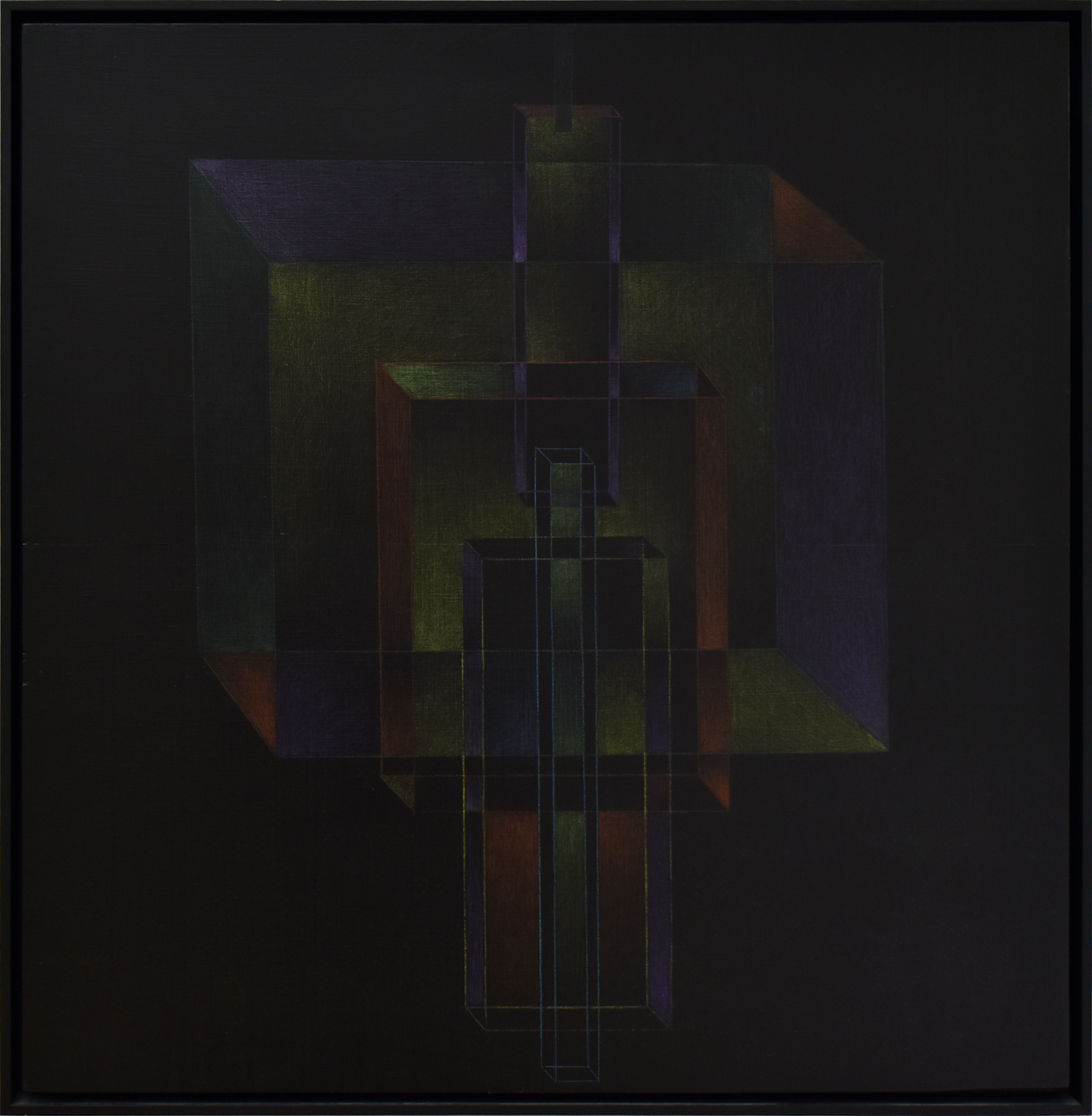
Conversations with Hawking, 2012

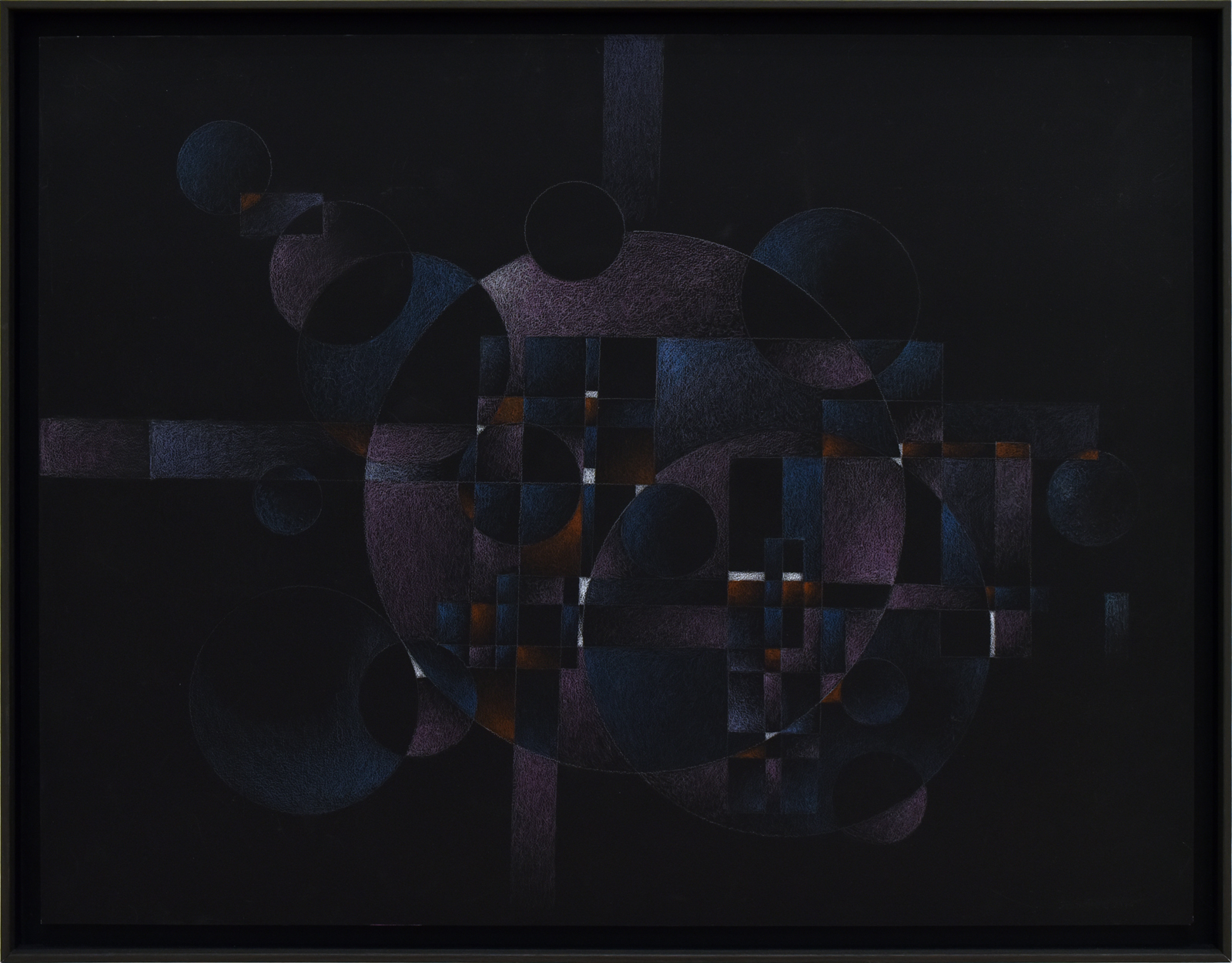
Conversations with Hawking II, 2017

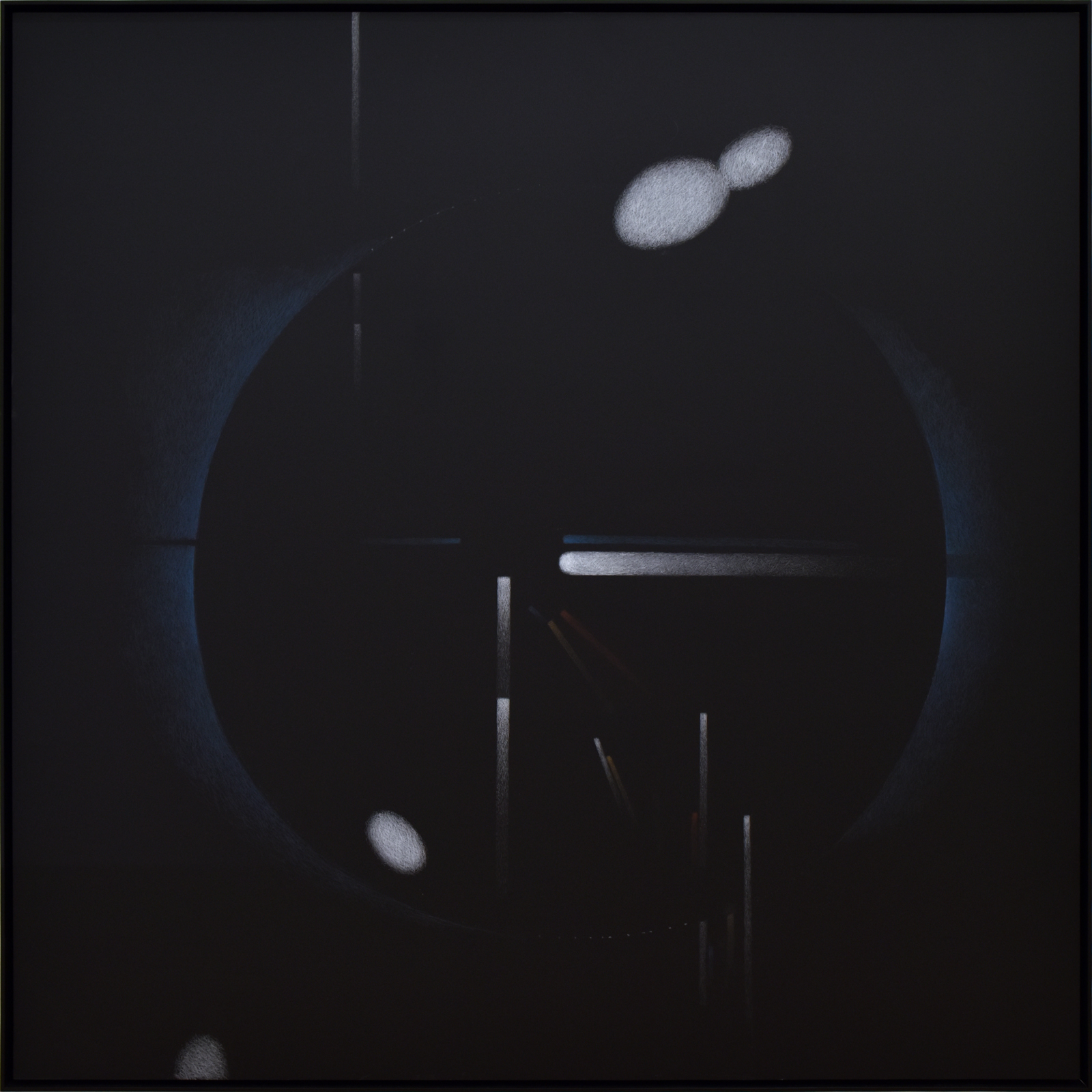
Conversations with Hawking, 2018

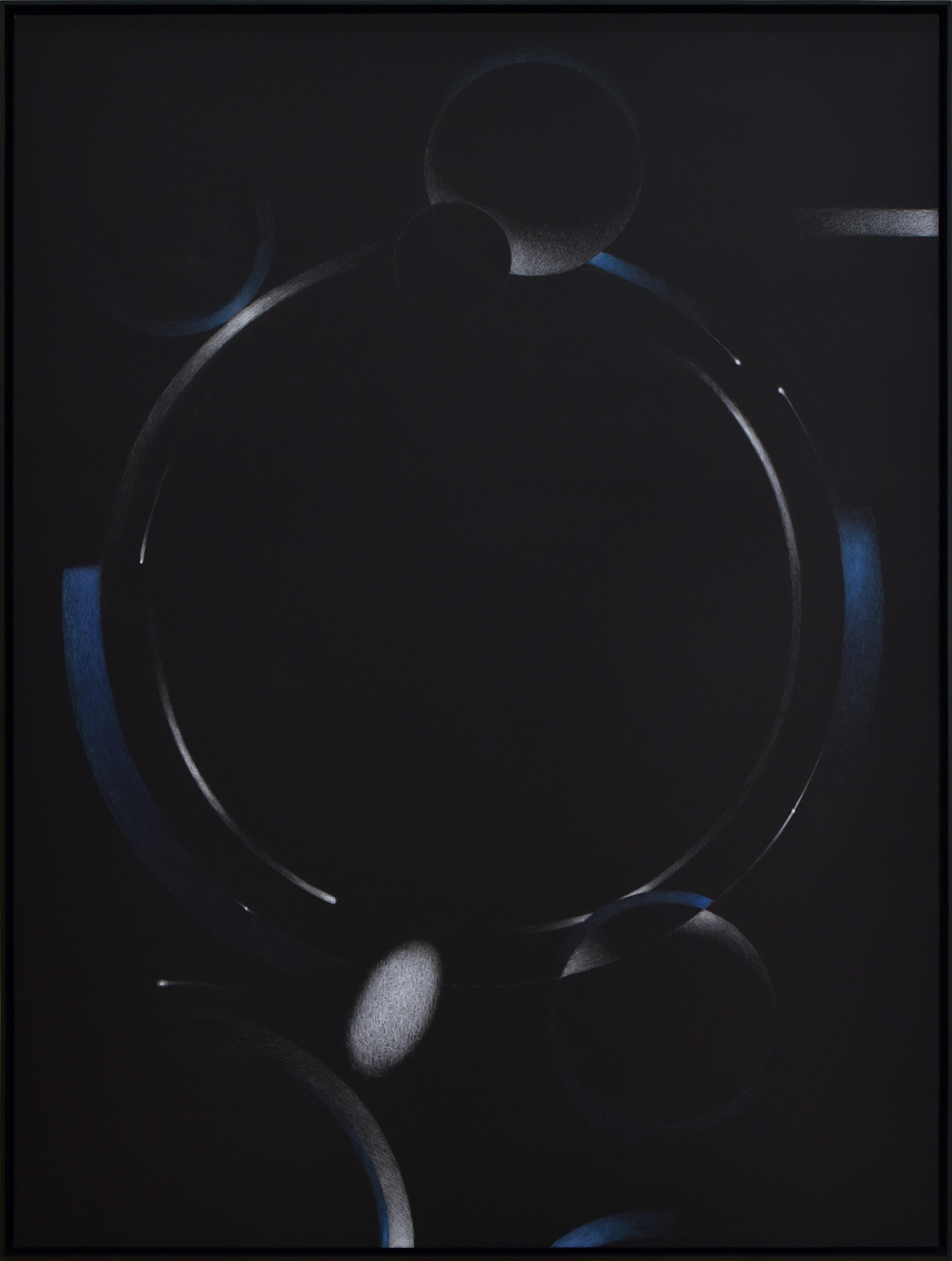
Conversations with Hawking III, 2019

Besides his film work, for which Theodor Pištěk has received the highest honours, his painting is also highly valued. In 2013, his painting A Visit to the Harrachs (1979) was auctioned for 3,240,000 Kč, while in 2016 Seagull Flying into a Dream (1984) was auctioned for 2,900,000 Kč. His painting Adieu, Guy Moll (1992–2017) became the most expensive artwork by a living Czech artist ever sold at auction (21,200,000 Kč).

=== Objects ===
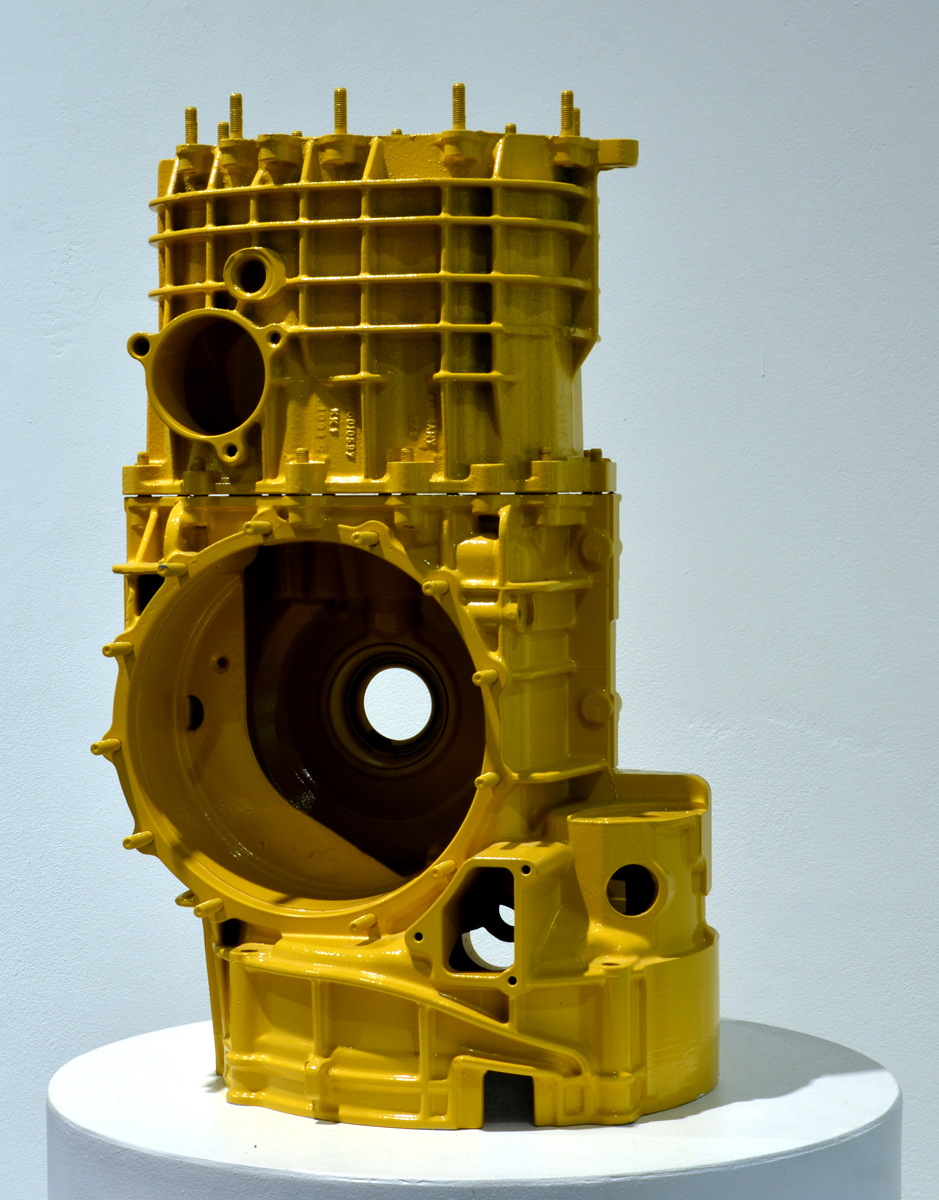
Bart Simpson, 2003

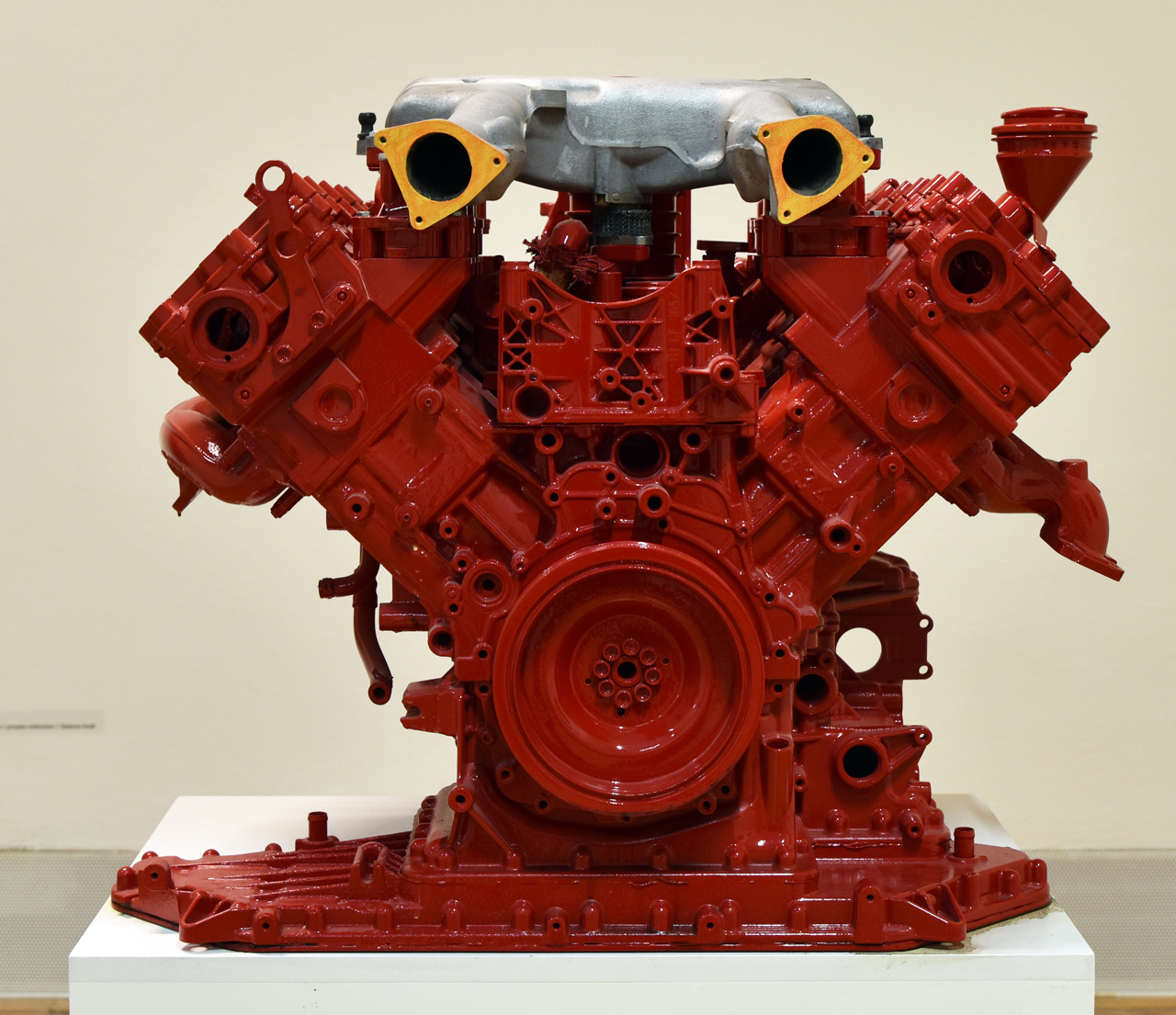
Red Head, 2019

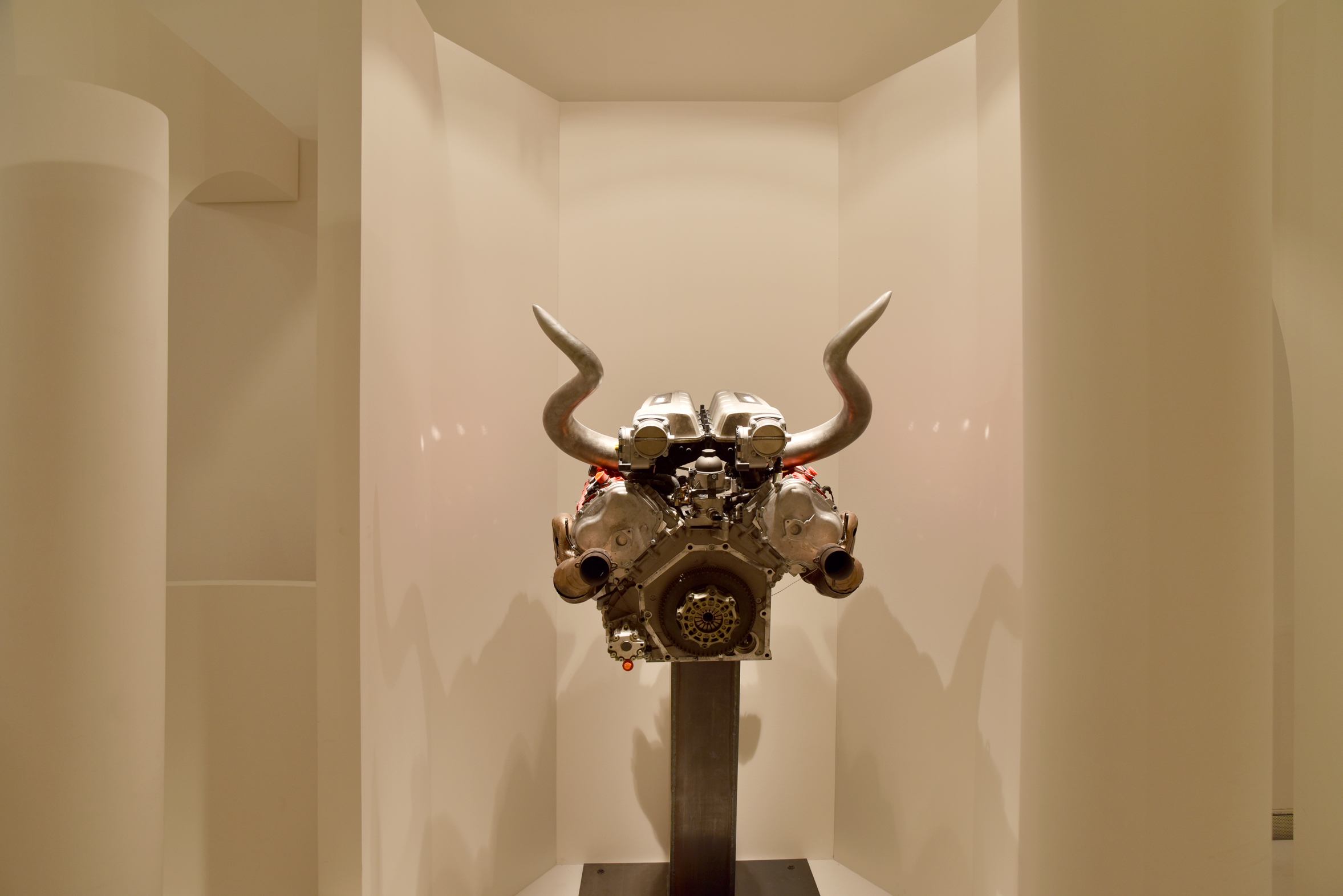
Mínotaurus, 2019

=== Conceptual installations ===
Pištěk's conceptual installation of sacred objects in the former riding school in Hluboká nad Vltavou had a dramatic gradation and scope, and within the context of postmodern scepticism it offered an updating of the psychological values of collectively valid myths. On an altar in the foreground, which he titled Homage to Böcklin's “Centaur Watching Fish”, he placed the scoop of an excavator arching over a fish in a glass sphere. At the head of the riding school he installed an altar painting with an illusionistic landscape in the Baroque style, to which he added brightly coloured geometrical forms that quoted the American postmodernist Frank Stella. In front of this painting was a pyramid with a pile of refuse that was titled Reliquary. The side altars, hidden in a labyrinth, depicted the Crucifixion as the hanging chassis of a racing car and the Visitation made of an old petrol pump, with car doors as the angel's wings. According to Jiří Šetlík, Pištěk's subjective interpretation of our sick world unmasks our faith in consumerist idols.

Pištěk's three-dimensional objects for his exhibition at the Prague City Gallery (1999) worked with the contrast between image and sound. Garden was a pavilion made of massive children's building blocks surrounded by a forest of hanging poles protecting the pavilion's privacy, with a soundtrack of whispered conversations too quiet to be heard. Next to Garden was Forest, a glass pyramid filled with fragments of wood and rubbish from fly tipping, together with romantic forest still lifes and a soundtrack of chainsaws and falling trees. Other objects relate to Pištěk's film work and his racing career. At the entrance to his retrospective exhibition at the National Gallery Prague, he installed his labyrinthine City and behind it a large glass box with a pile of film costumes, while in the middle of the exhibition space was a racing car. His conceptual diorama The End of the Forest was an artificial forest made of suspended poles through which visitors could look at a painted landscape covering the entire wall (Trade Fair Palace, National Gallery Prague, 2012). This stepping out of the picture plane into the third dimension is an agenda that Pištěk had earlier described in the introduction to a catalogue as “Neo-Romanticism”.

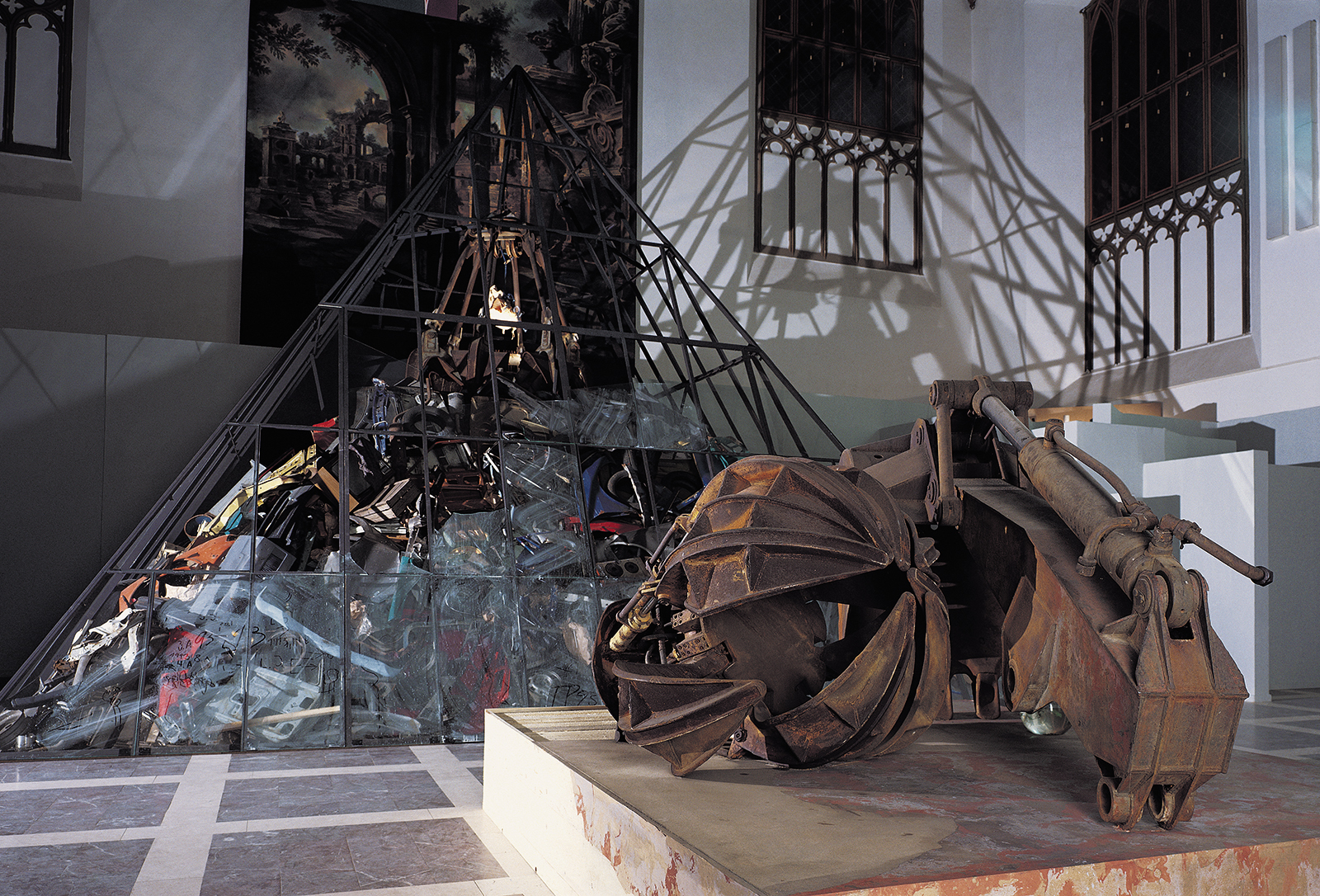
Centaurus Watching the Fish, AJG Hluboká, 1993

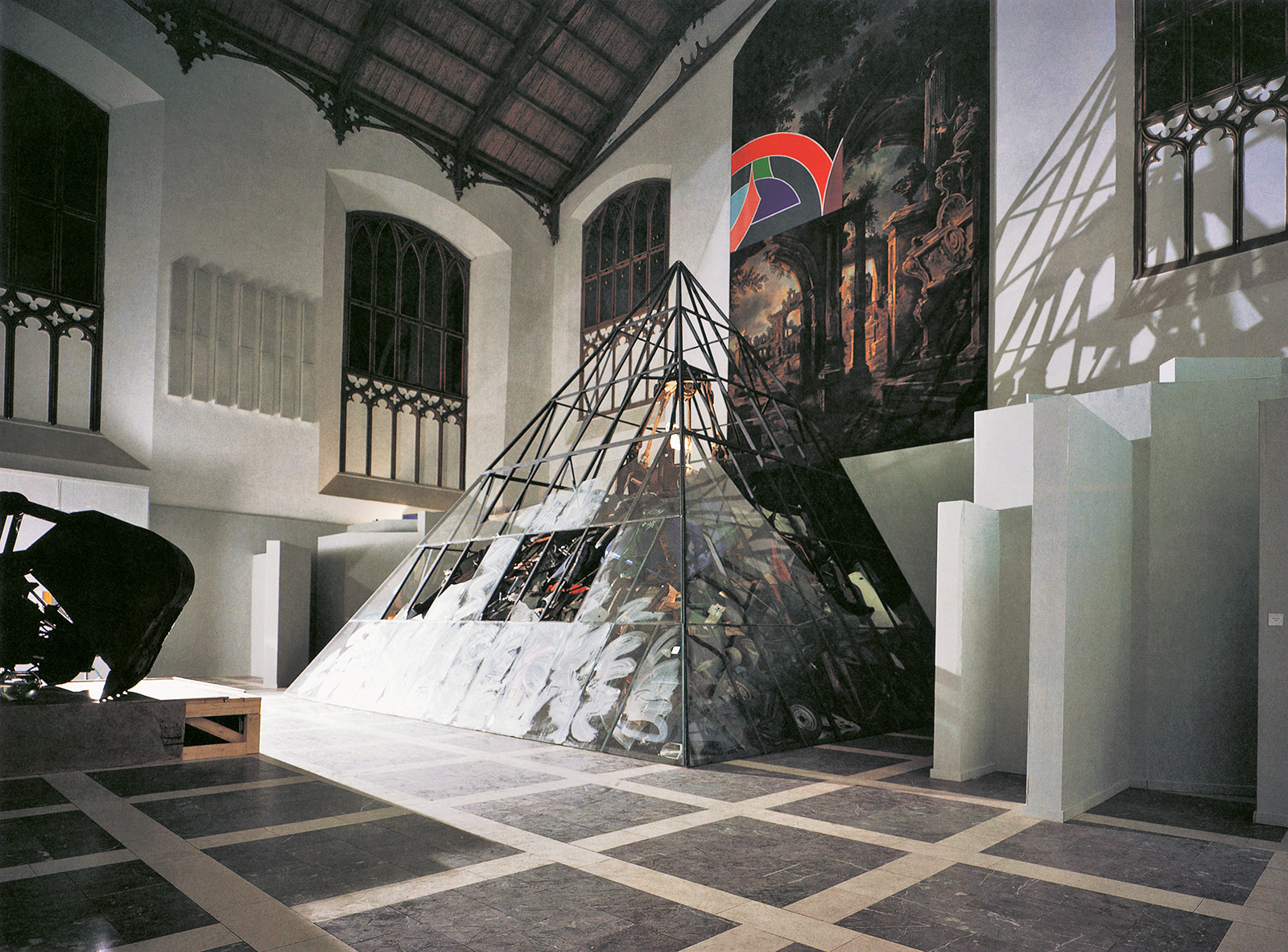
Reliquary, AJG Hluboká, 1993

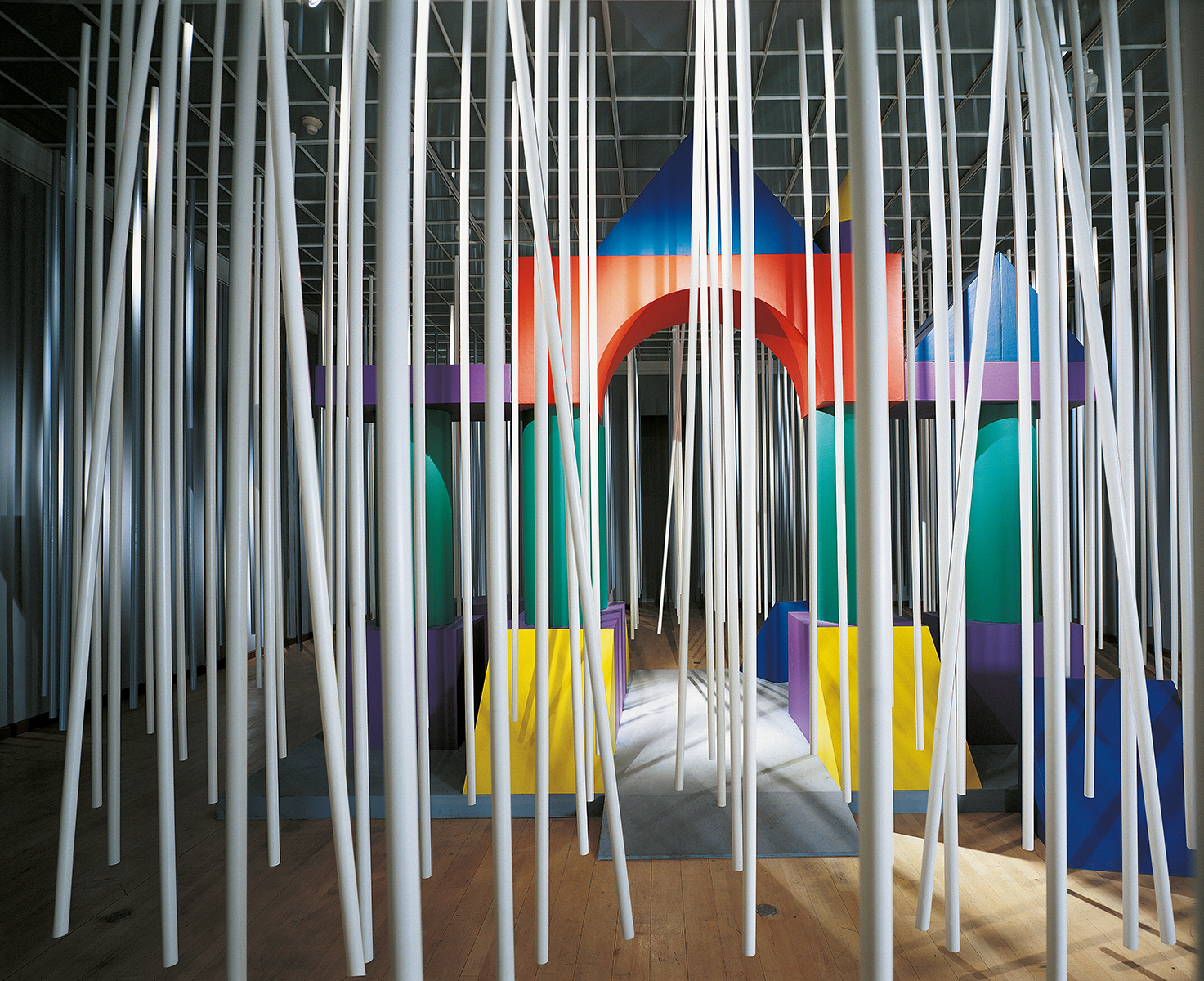
Garden, Prague City Gallery, 1999

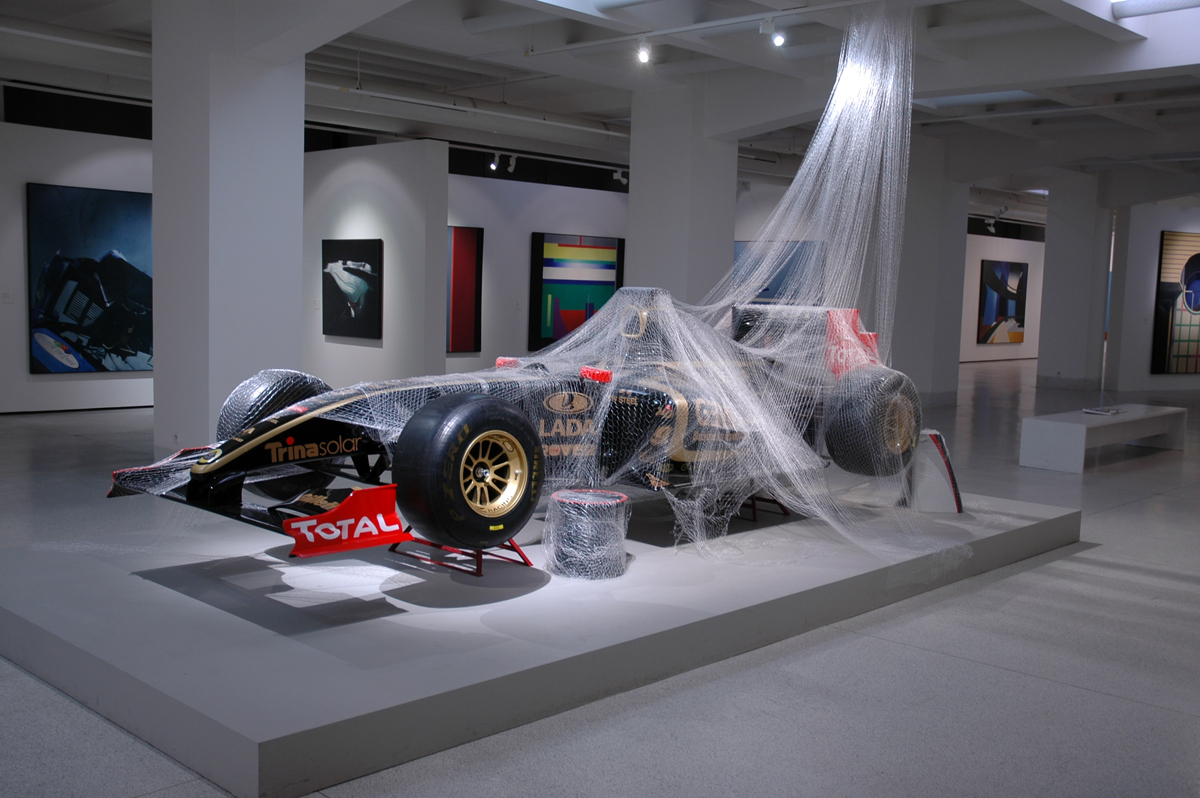
National Gallery Prague, 2012

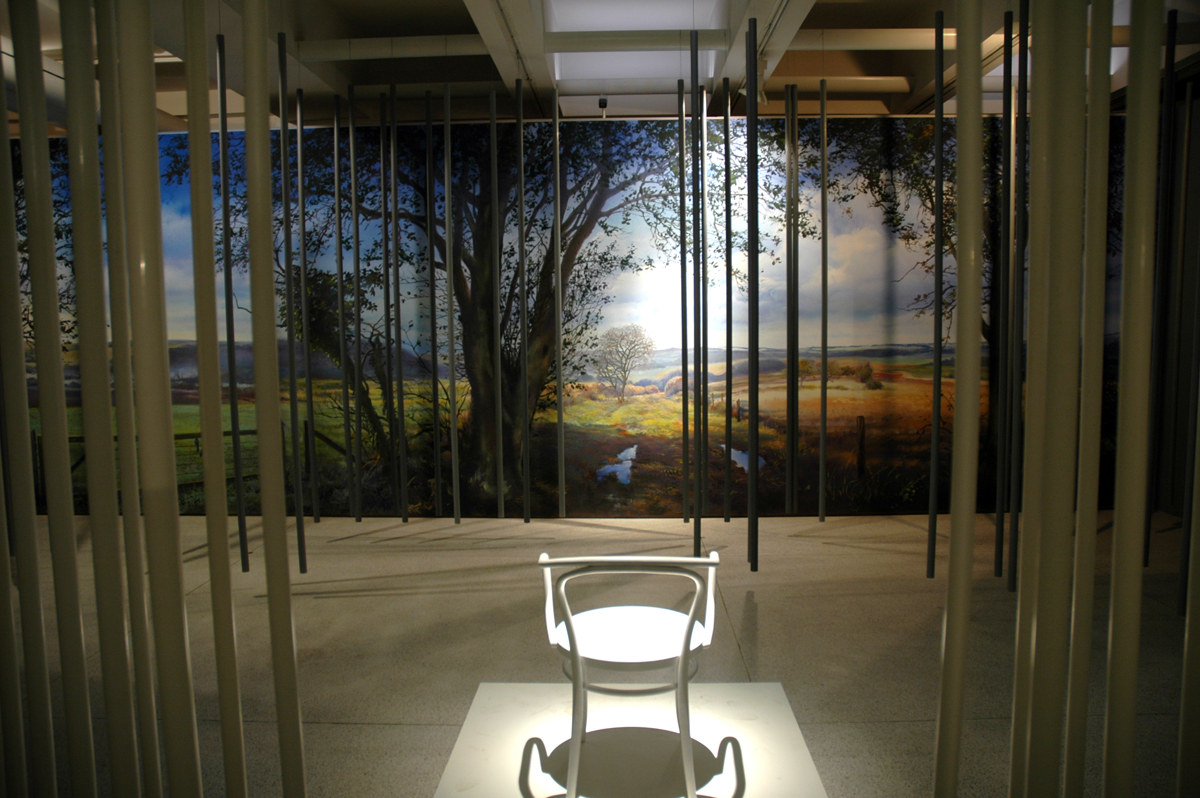
The End of Forest, National Gallery Prague, 2012

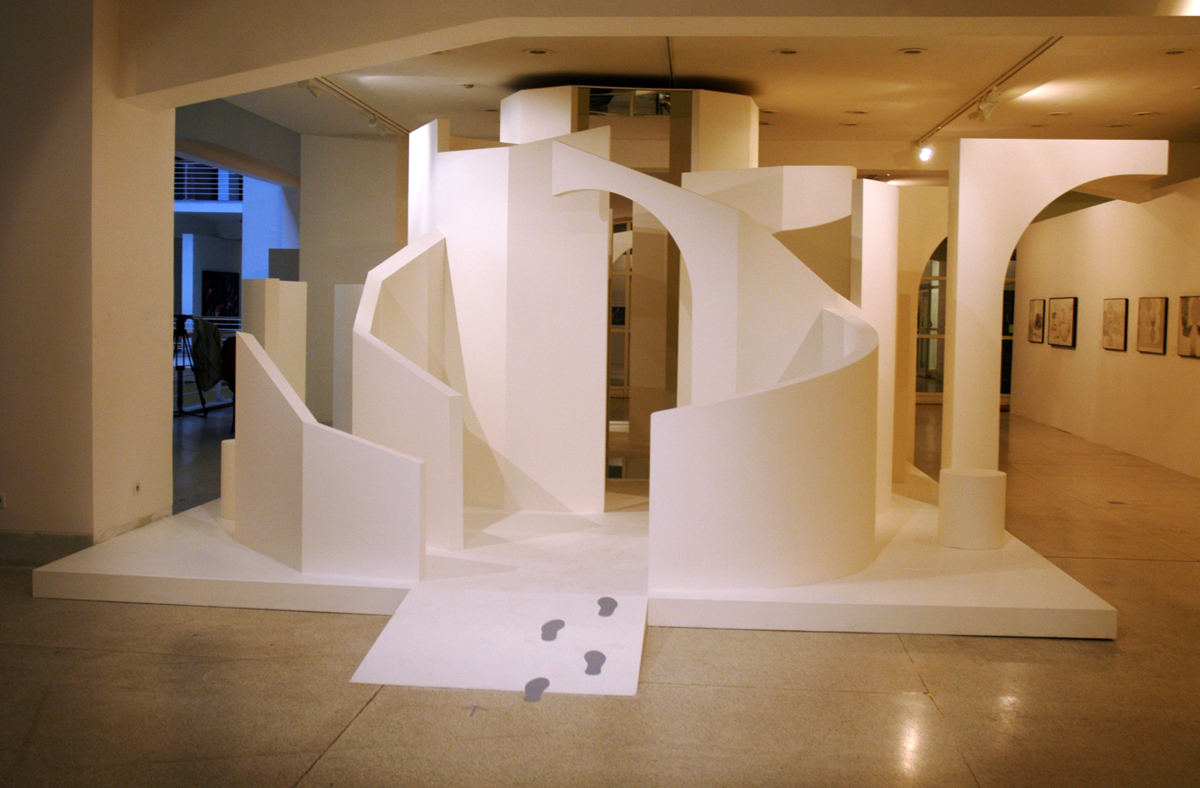
City Labyrinth, National Gallery Prague, 2012

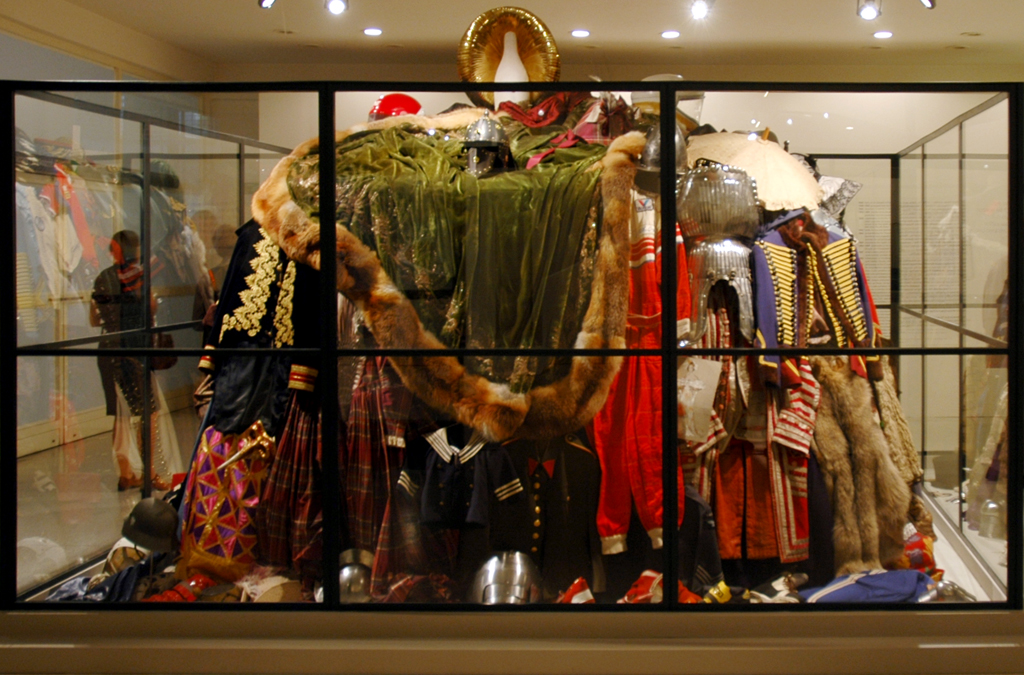
Film costumes, National Gallery Prague, 2012

=== Costumes and set design ===
==== Uniforms ====
- 1990 uniforms, banners and insignia for the Prague Castle Guard

==== Film ====
Pištěk has worked on 111 films with many Czech and Slovak directors, including Oldřich Lipský, Jiří Menzel, Jiří Krejčík, Juraj Herz; as well as with many others, including Janusz Majewski, Bob Hoskins and Jerzy Skolimowski. Some of his works:

- The White Dove (1959)
- Markéta Lazarová (1967)
- The Valley of the Bees (1968)
- Three Wishes for Cinderella (1973)
- Amadeus (1984)
- Valmont (1989)
- The People vs. Larry Flynt (1996)

==== Television ====
- Arabela (1979–1981)
- Pan Tau (1980)
- Návštěvníci (1983)
- Frank Herbert's Dune (2000)
- Frank Herbert's Children of Dune (2003)

==== Theater ====
- Miss Julie (1972), Divadlo na Zábradlí
- The Queen of Spades (1972), Smetanovo divadlo
- Don Giovanni (2006), National Theatre

==== Musical theater ====
- Dracula (1994)
- Rusalka (1998)
- The Count of Monte Christo (1999)

=== Collections ===
- National Gallery Prague
- Moravian Gallery in Brno
- Museum Kampa
- Regional galleries in the Czech Republic
- Galleria Arturo Schwarz, Milano
- Galerie Schüppenhauer, Cologne
- Galerie Volkmann, Münster
- Private collections home and abroad

=== Important exhibitions ===
- 2012/2013 Theodor Pištěk: Ecce Homo, National Gallery Prague
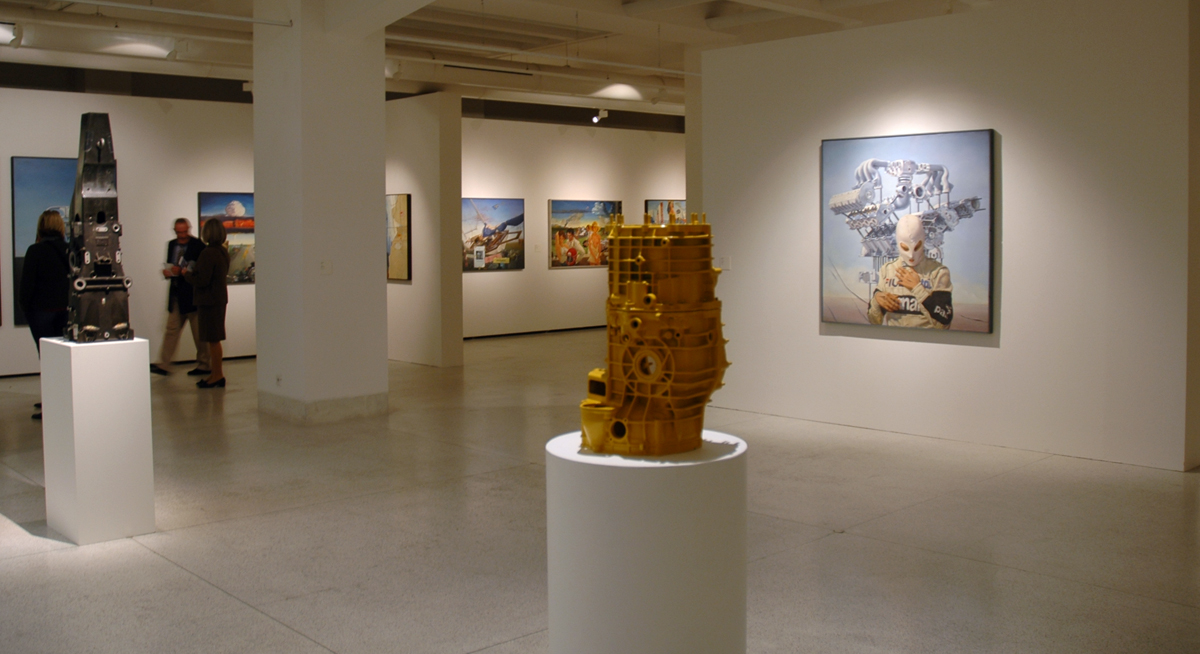

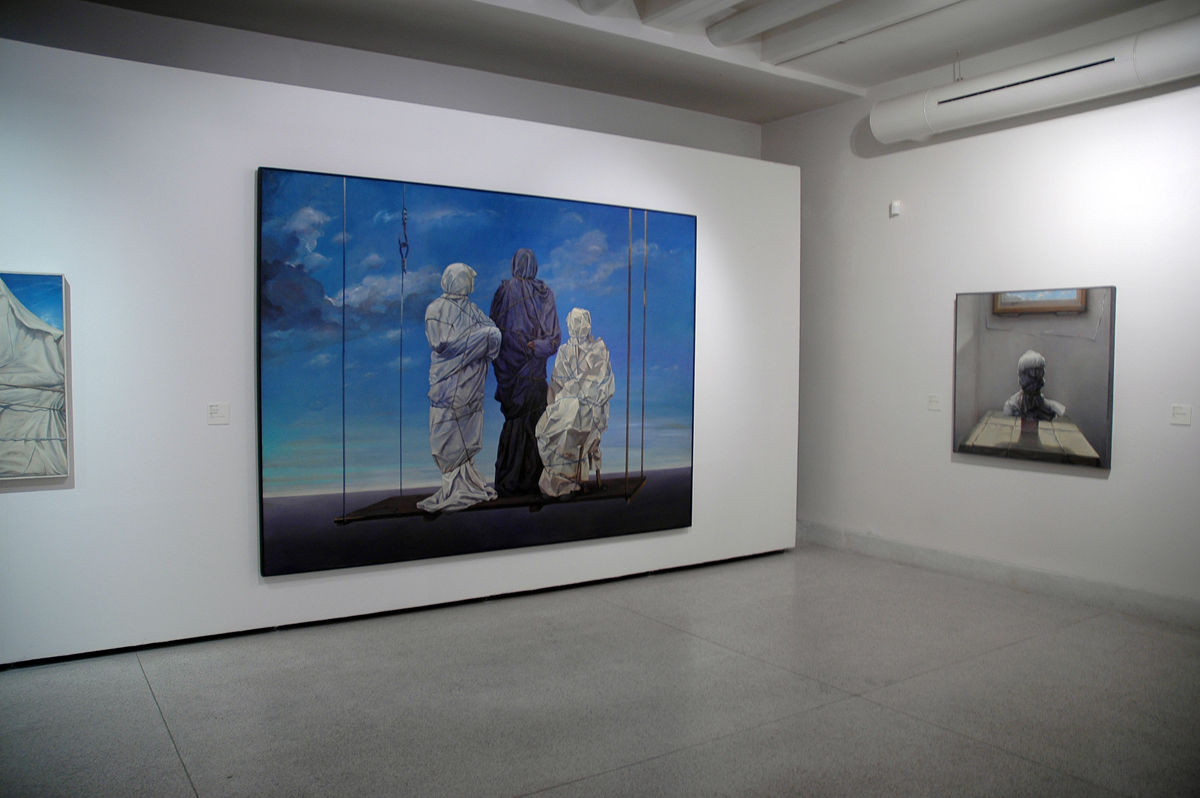

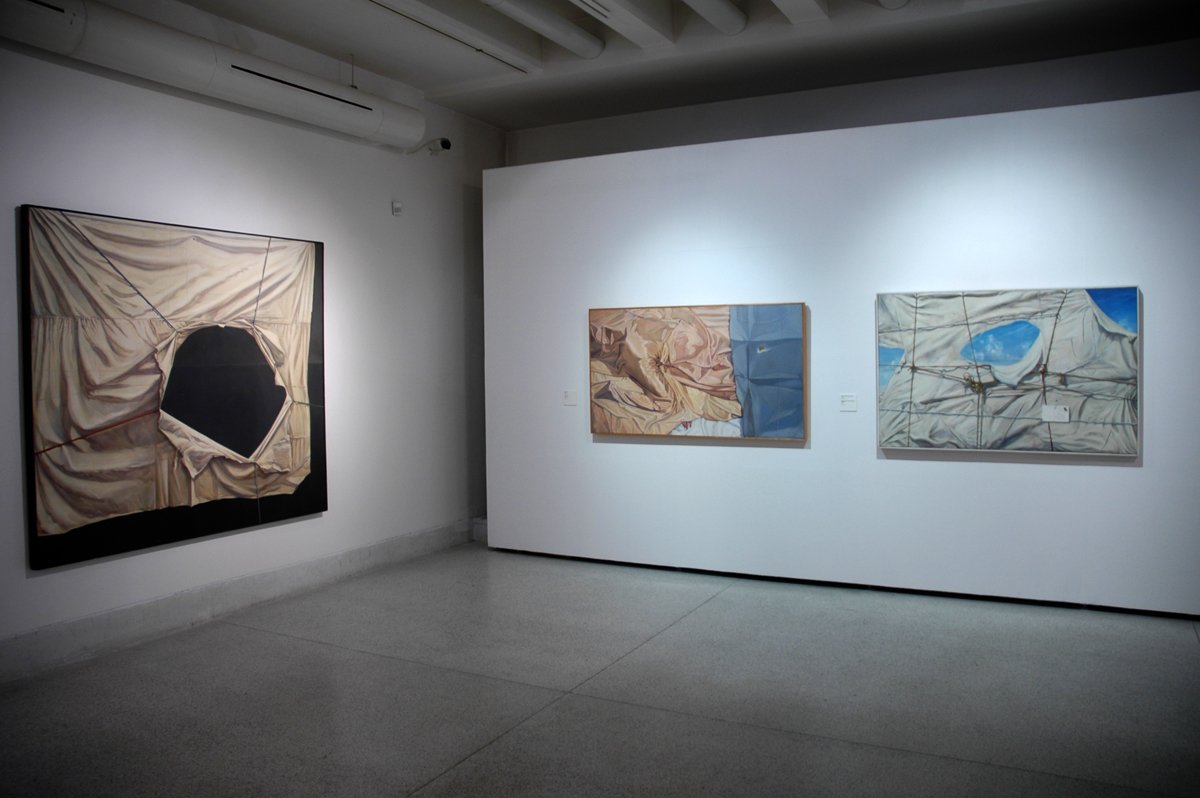

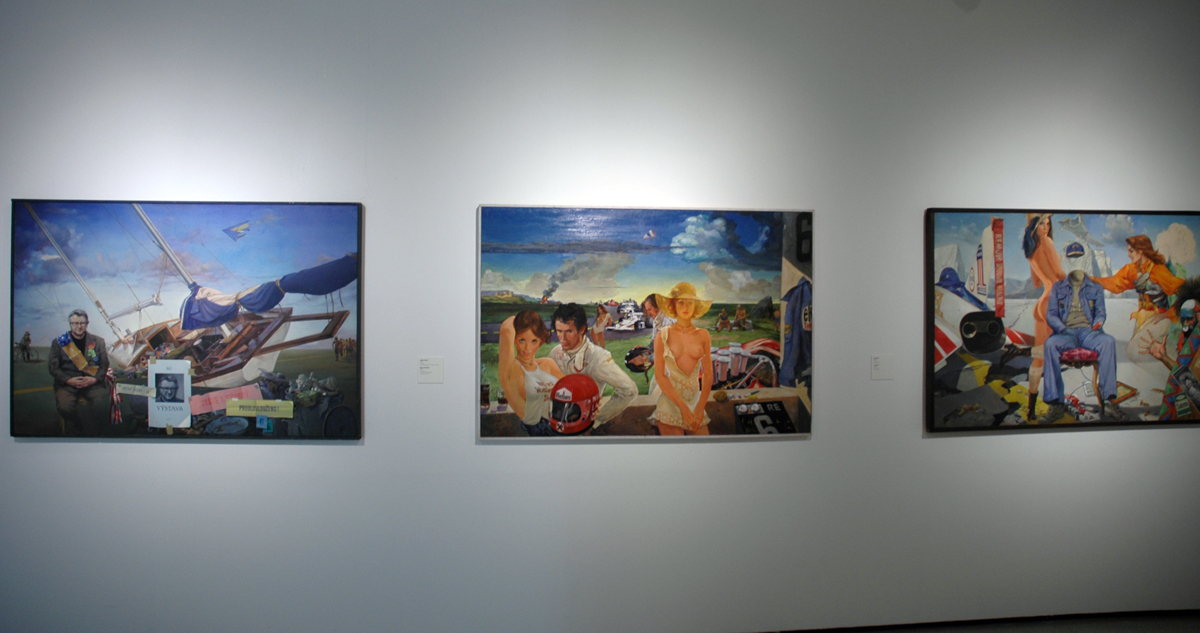

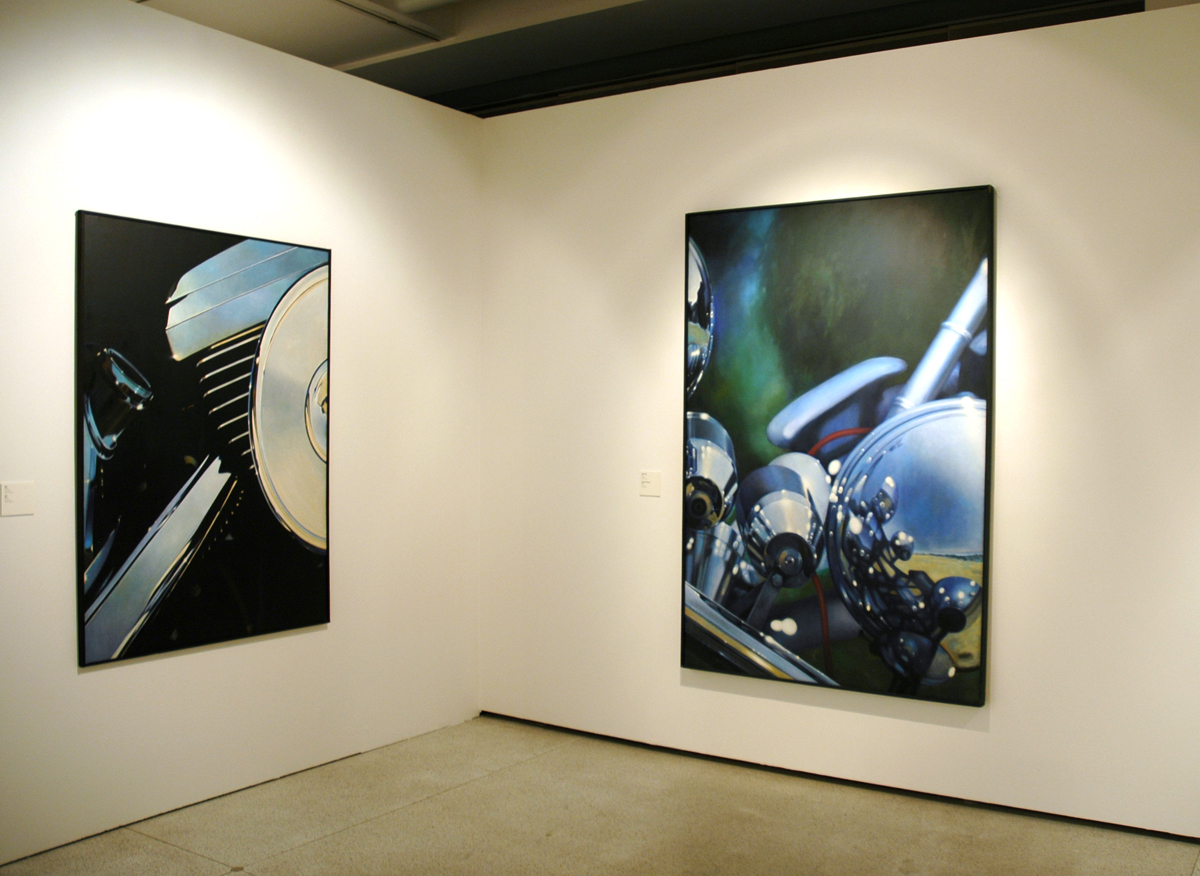

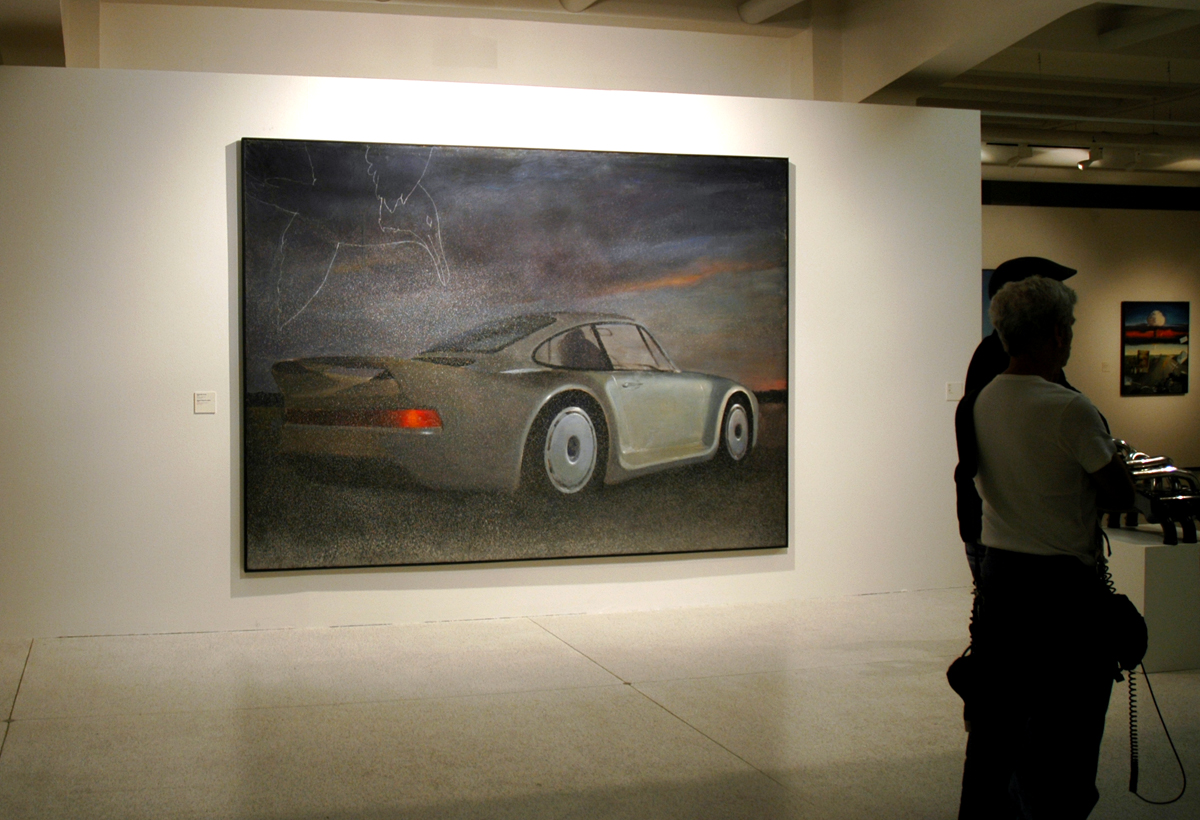

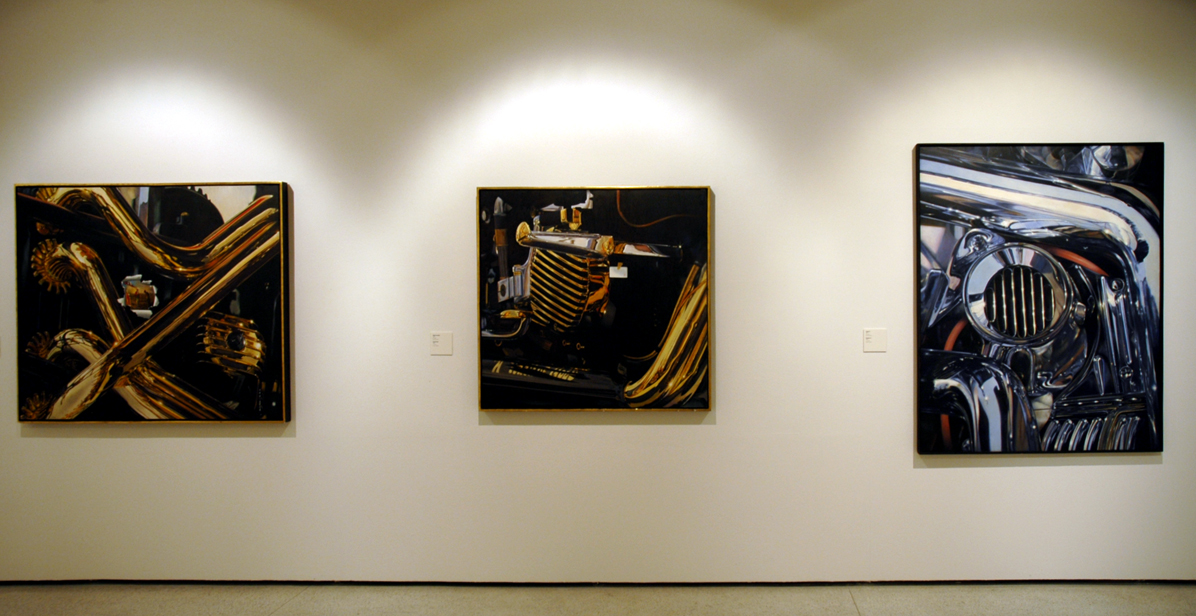

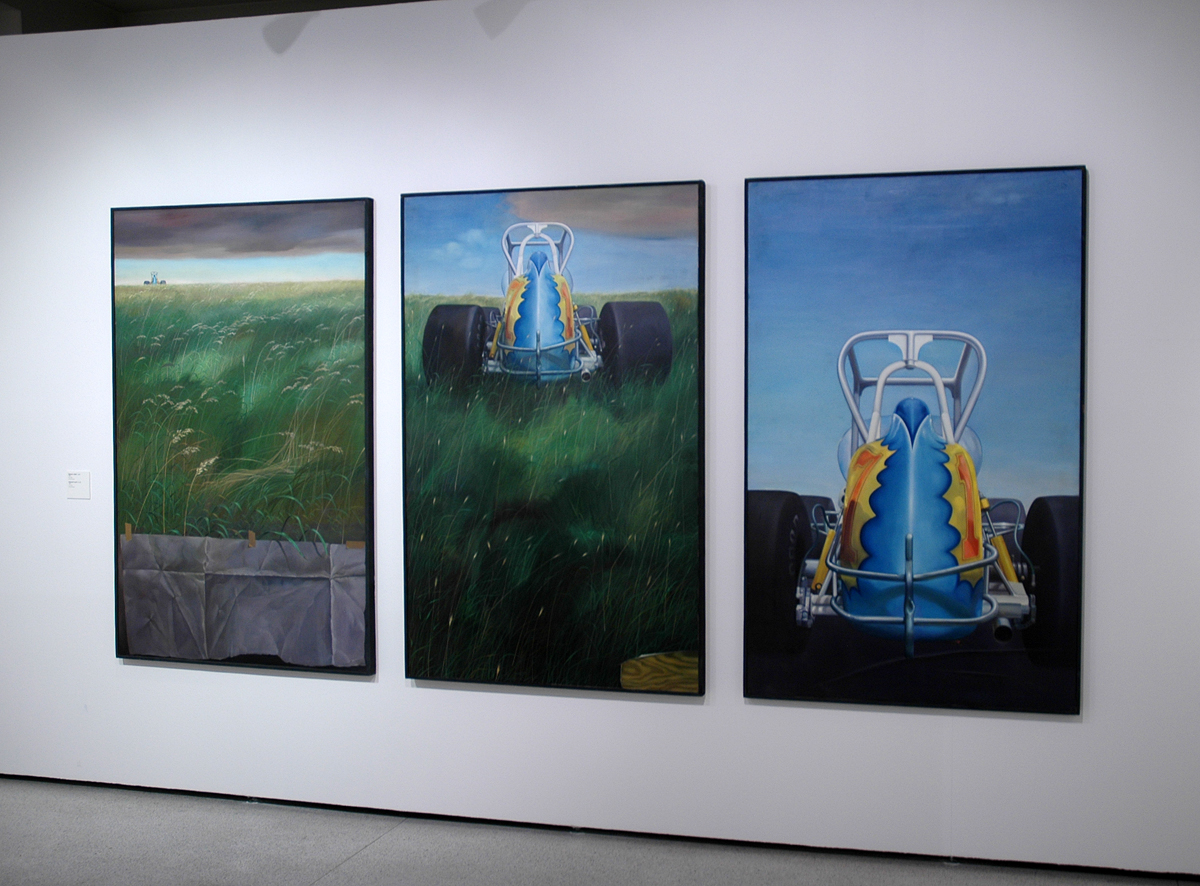

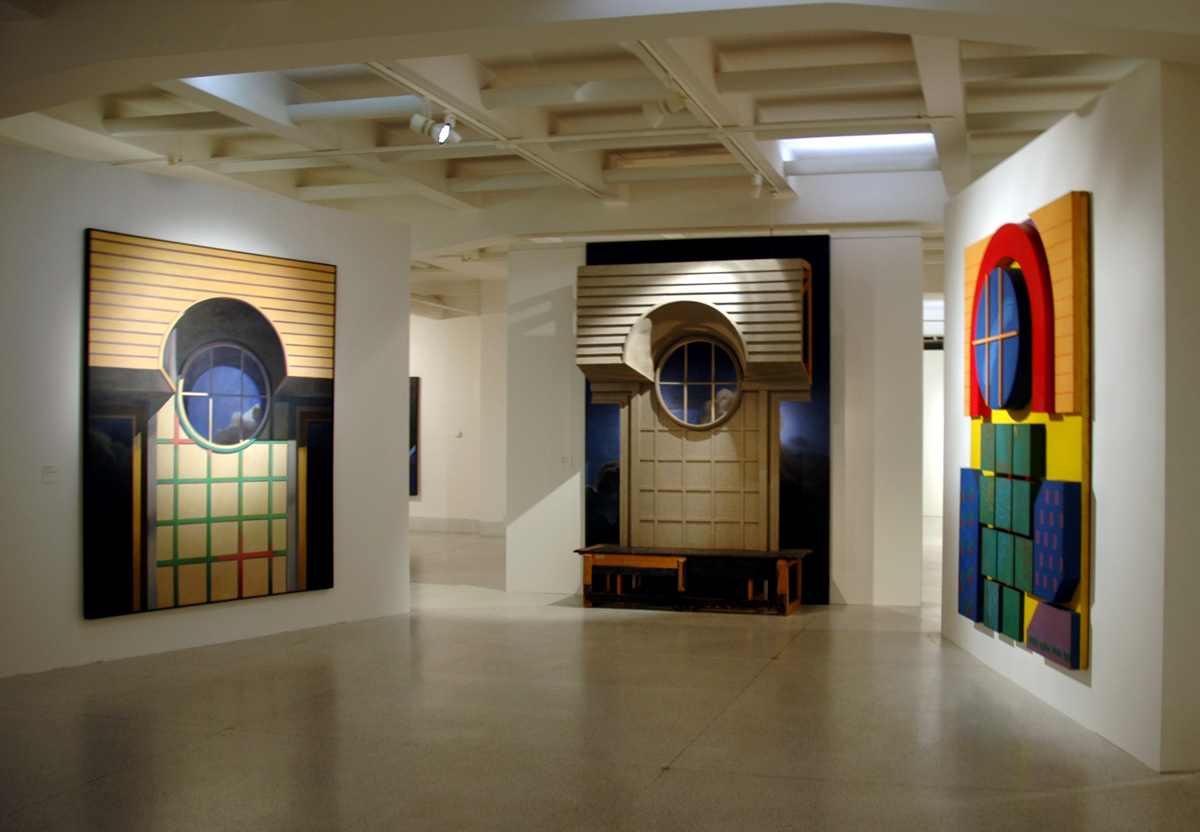

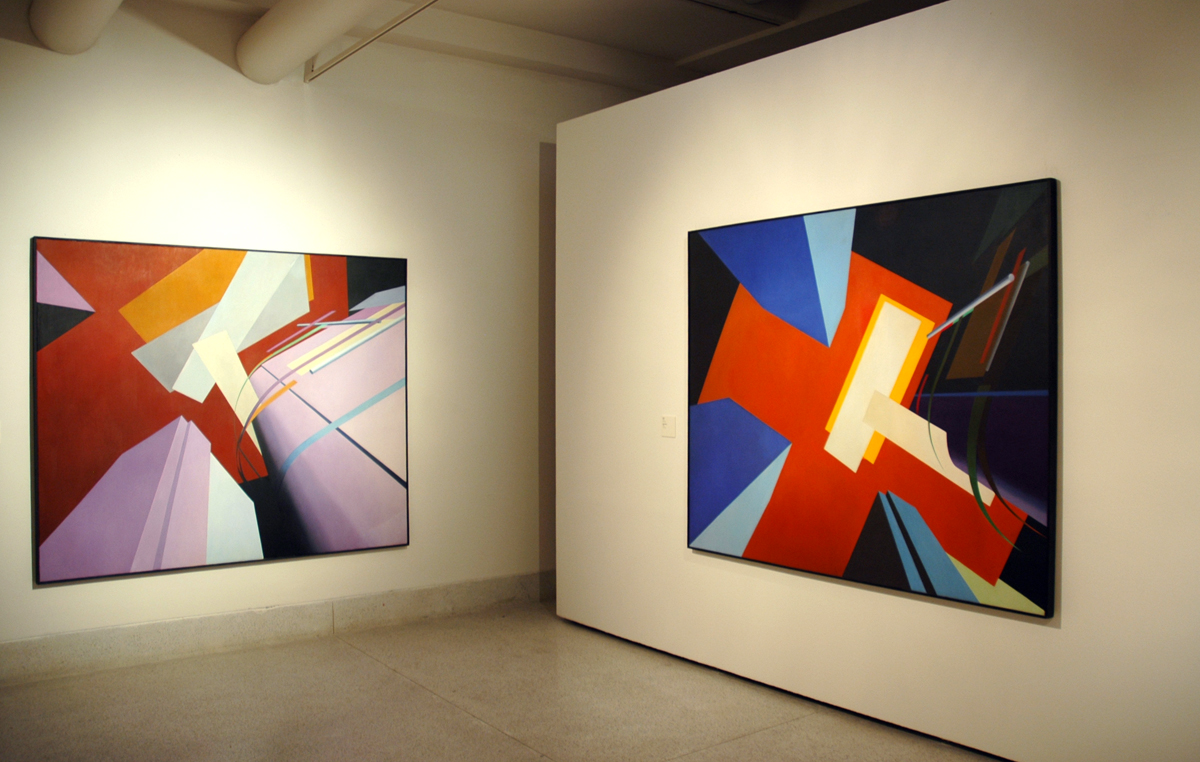

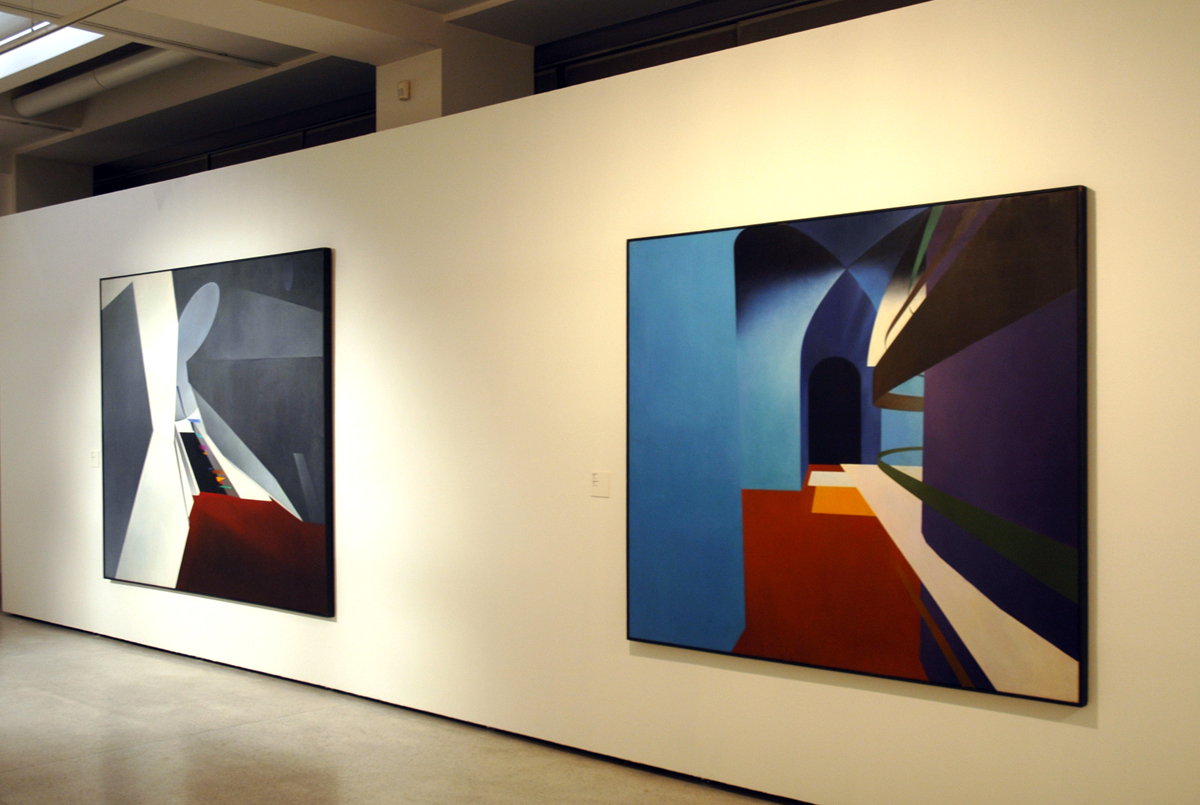
- 2019/2020 Theodor Pištěk: Angelus, House of Arts in Brno
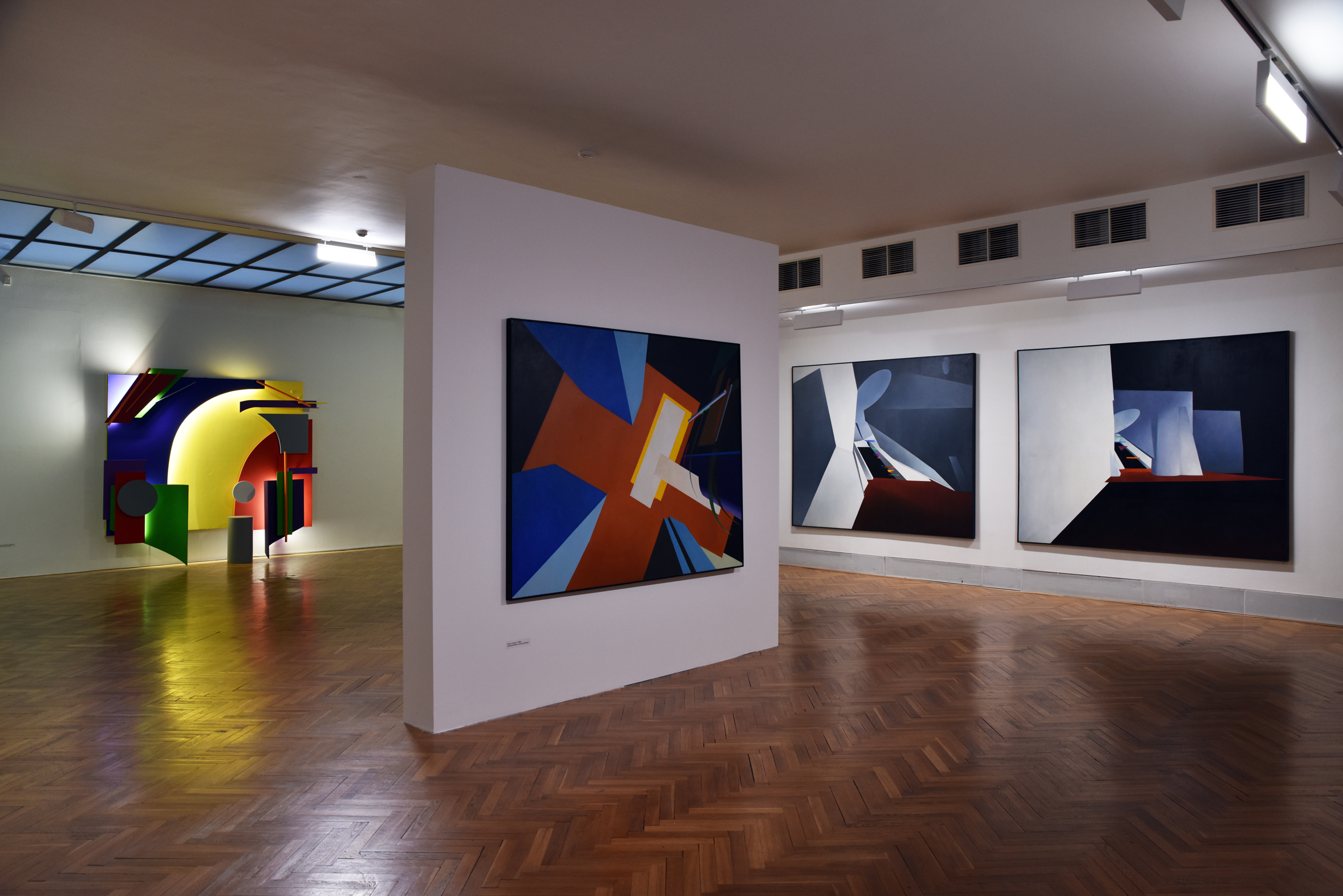

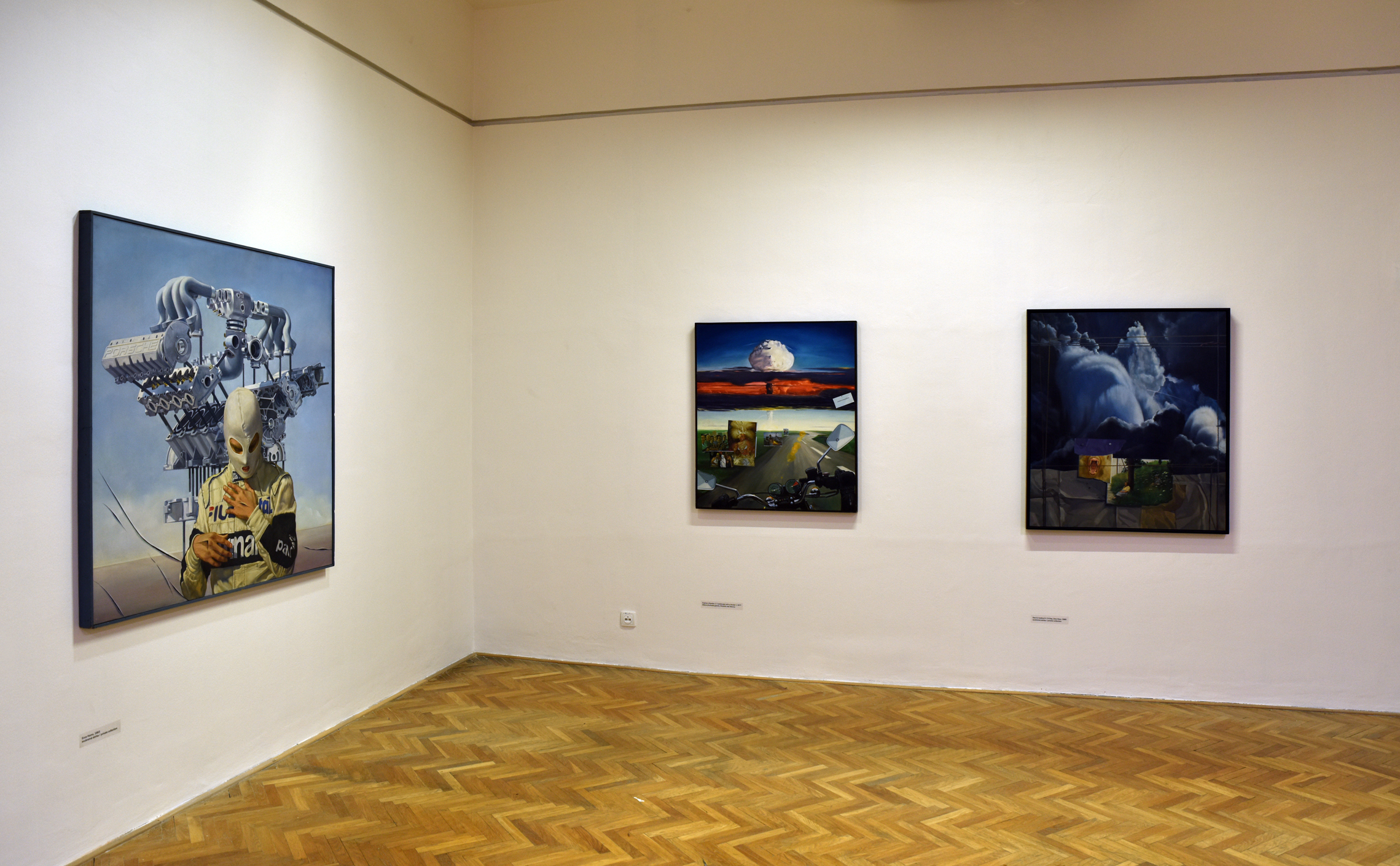

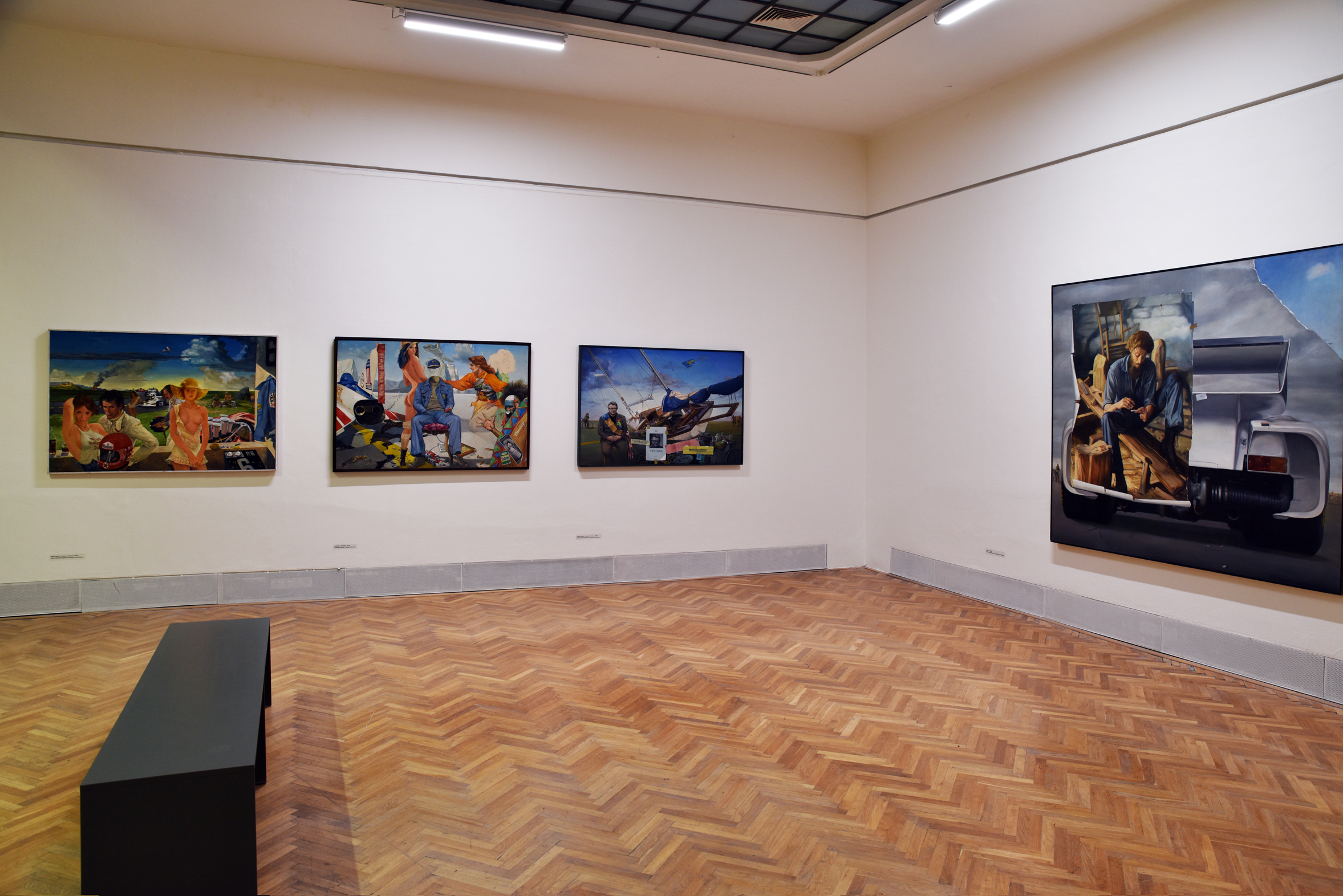

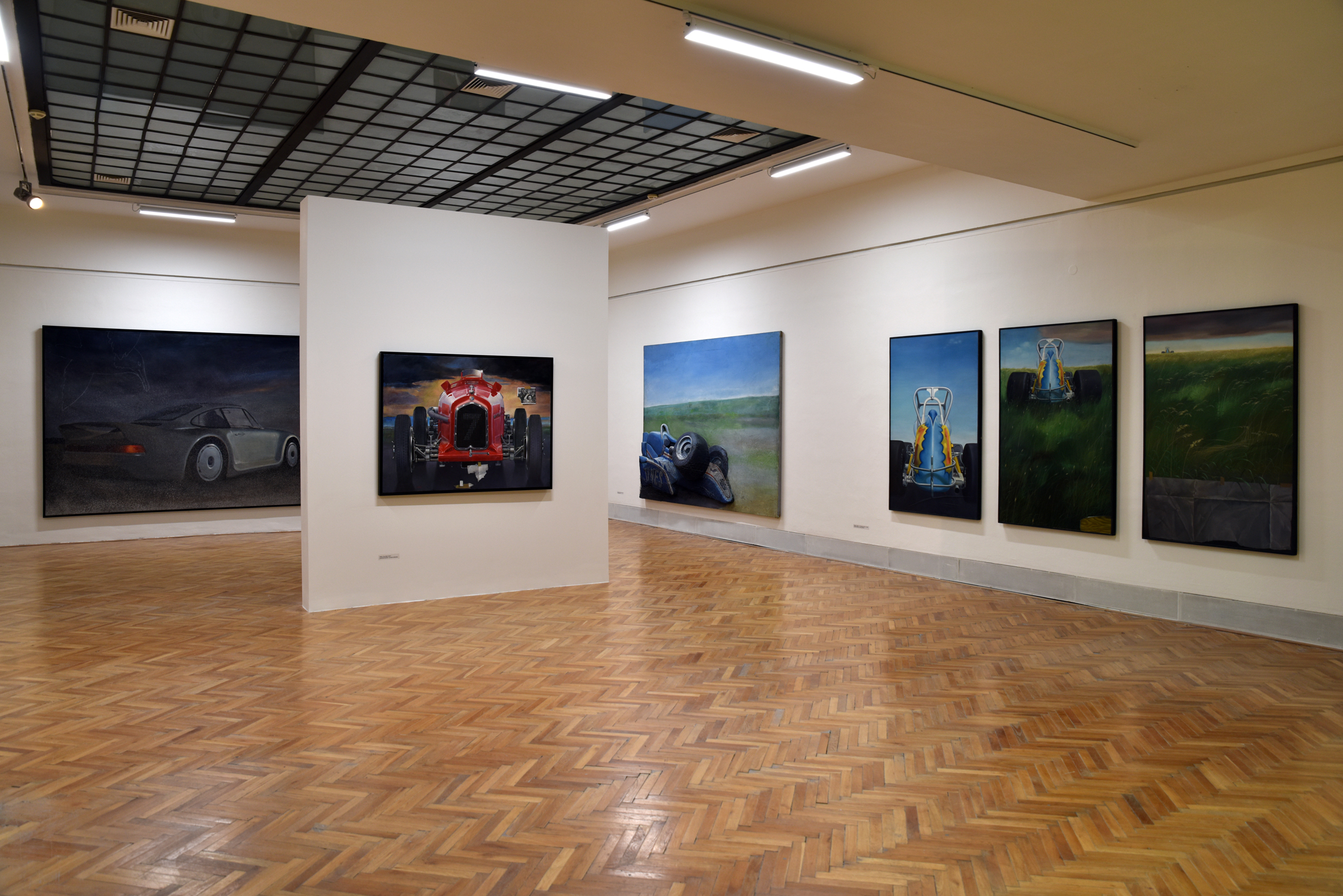

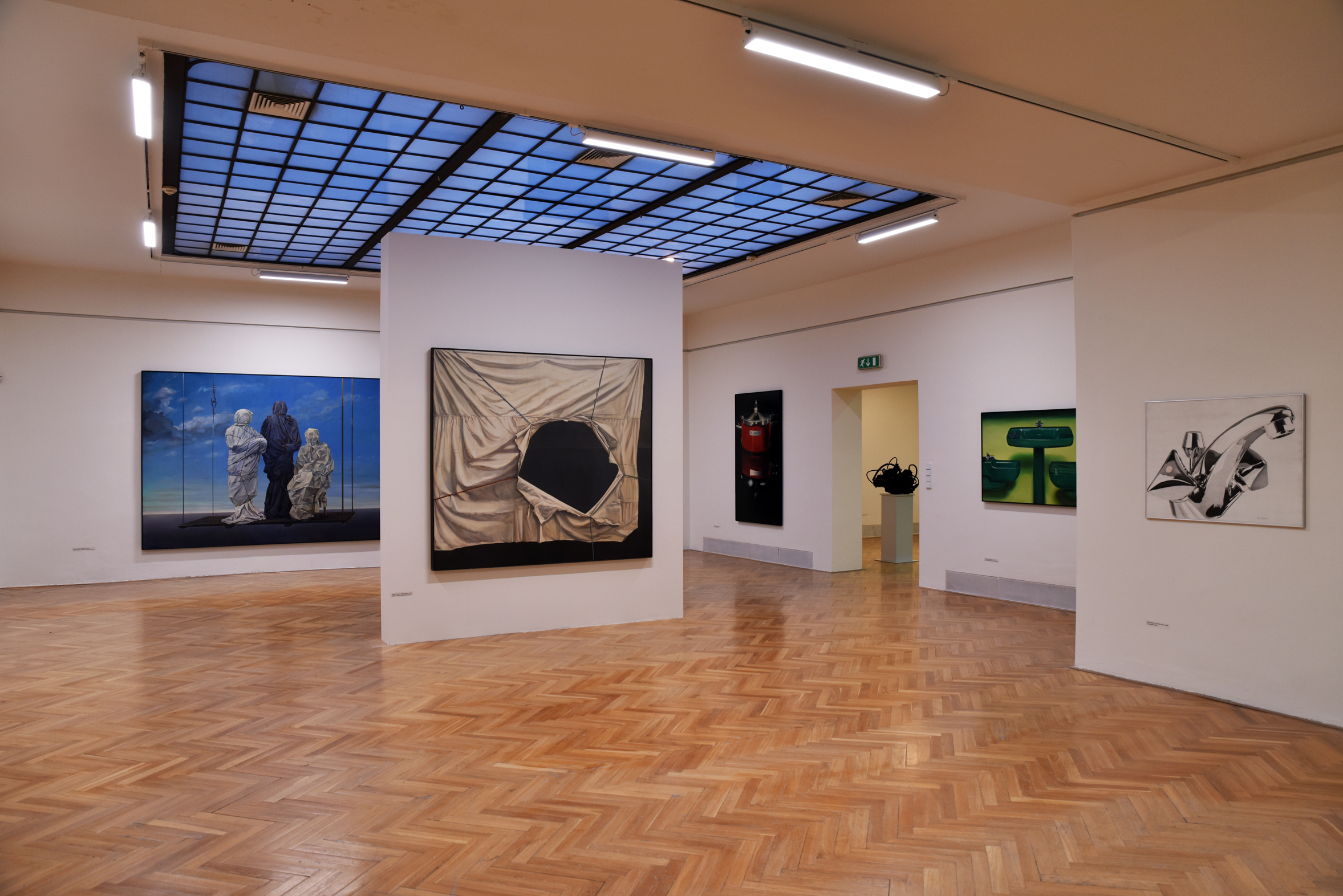

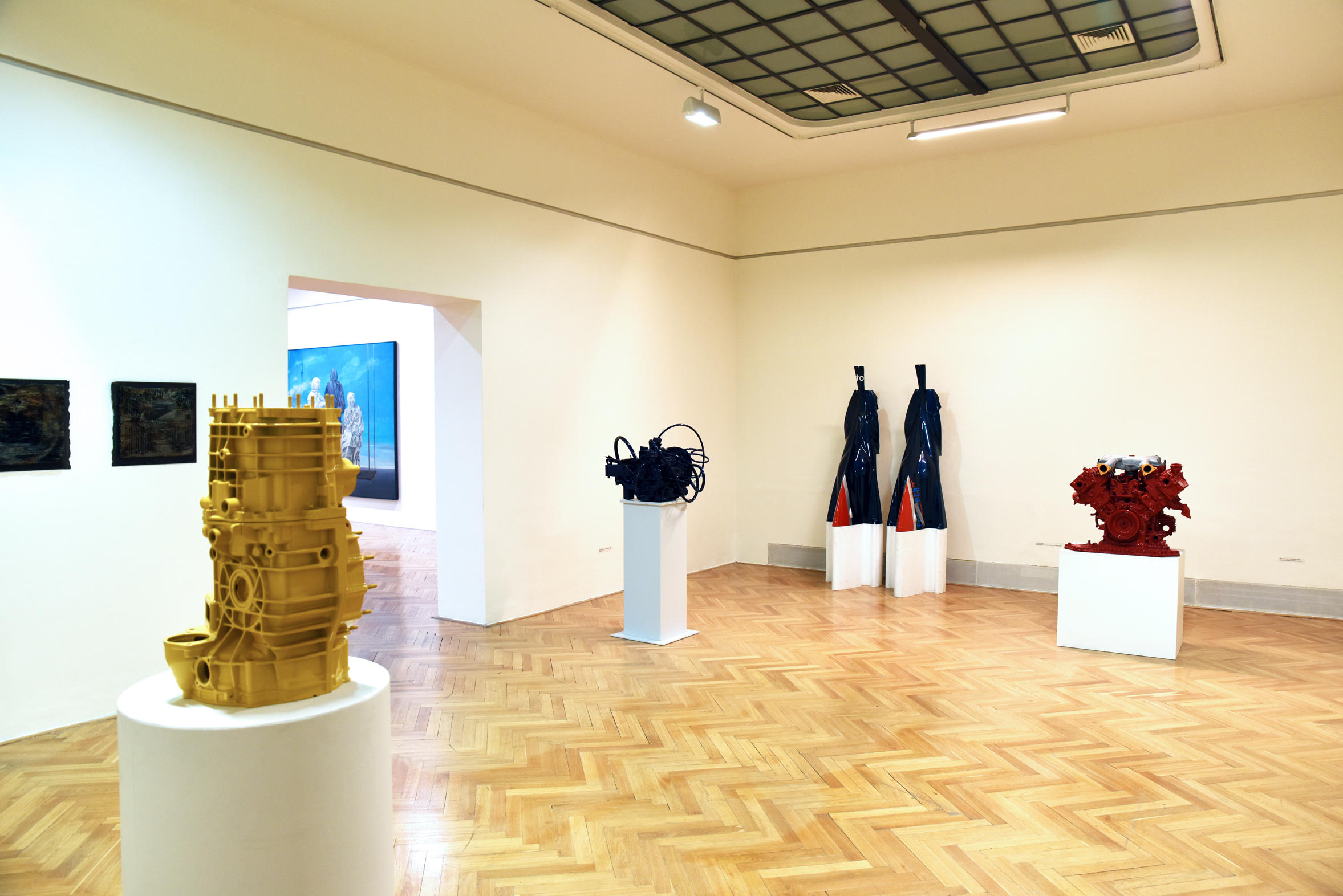

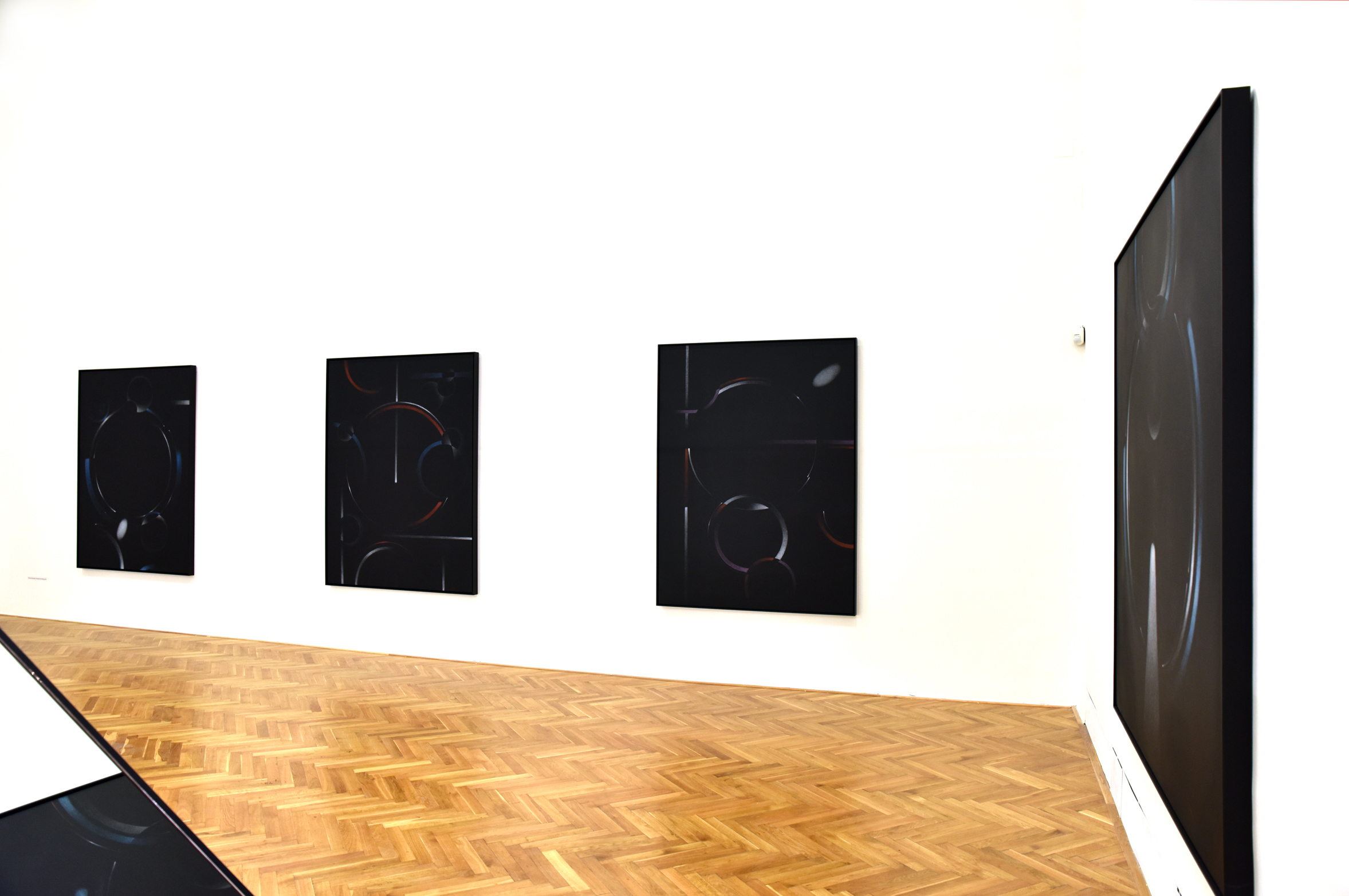

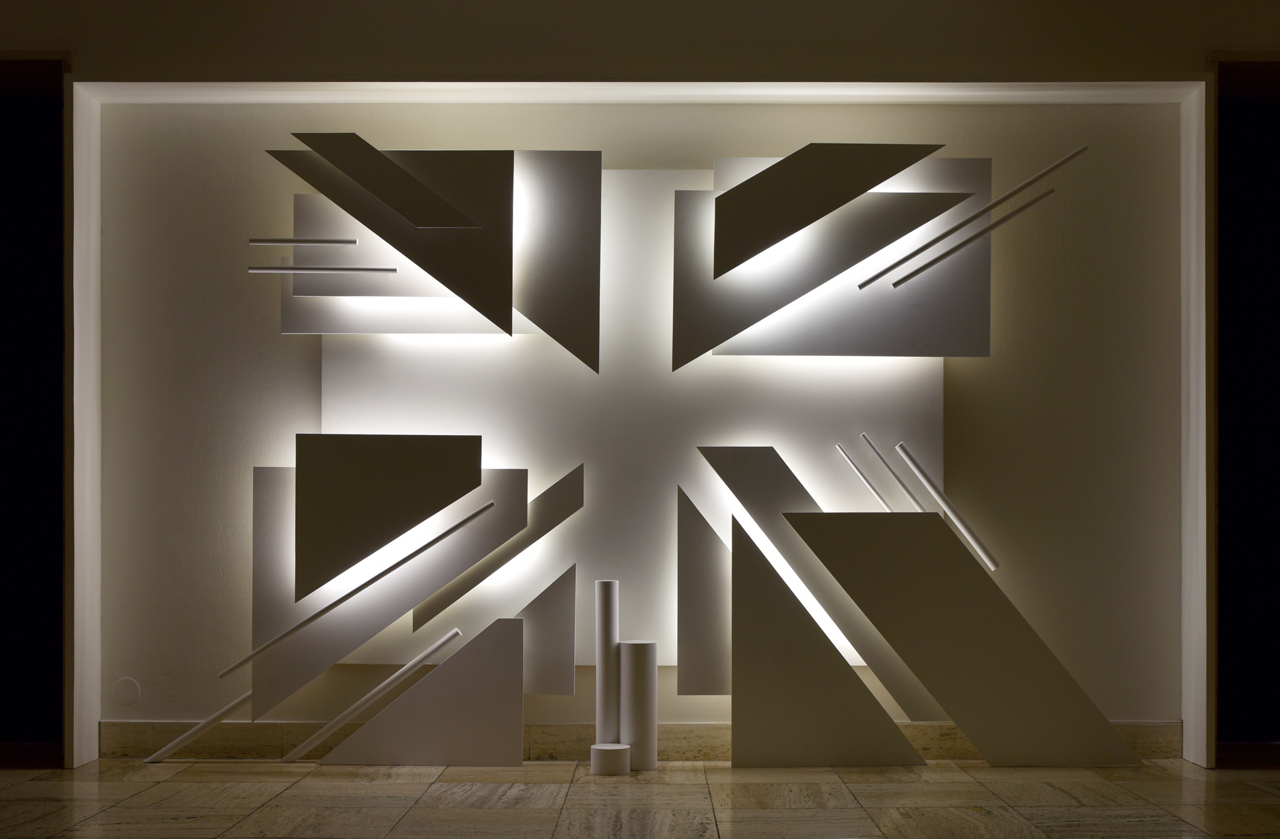
White 2

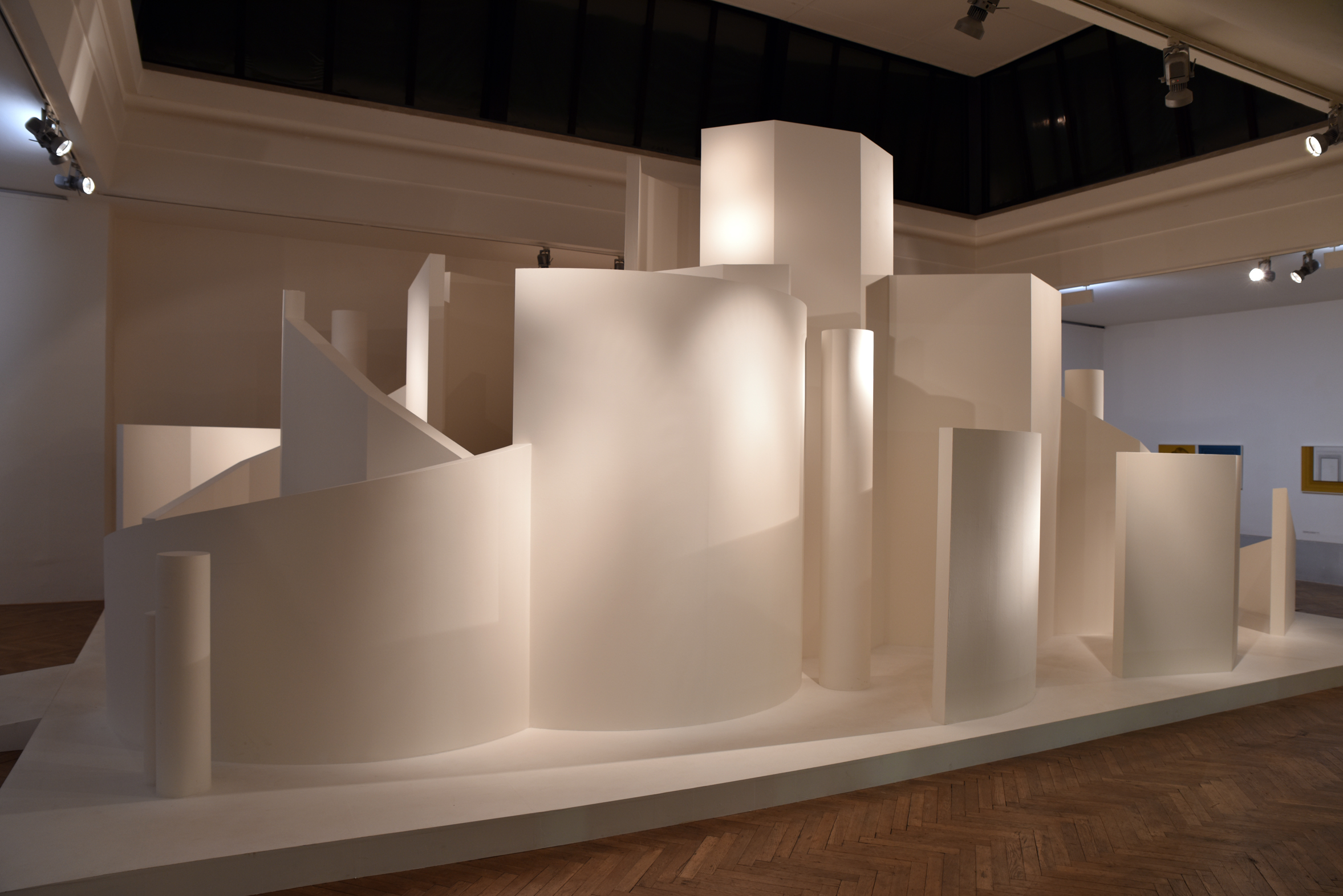
Labyrinth

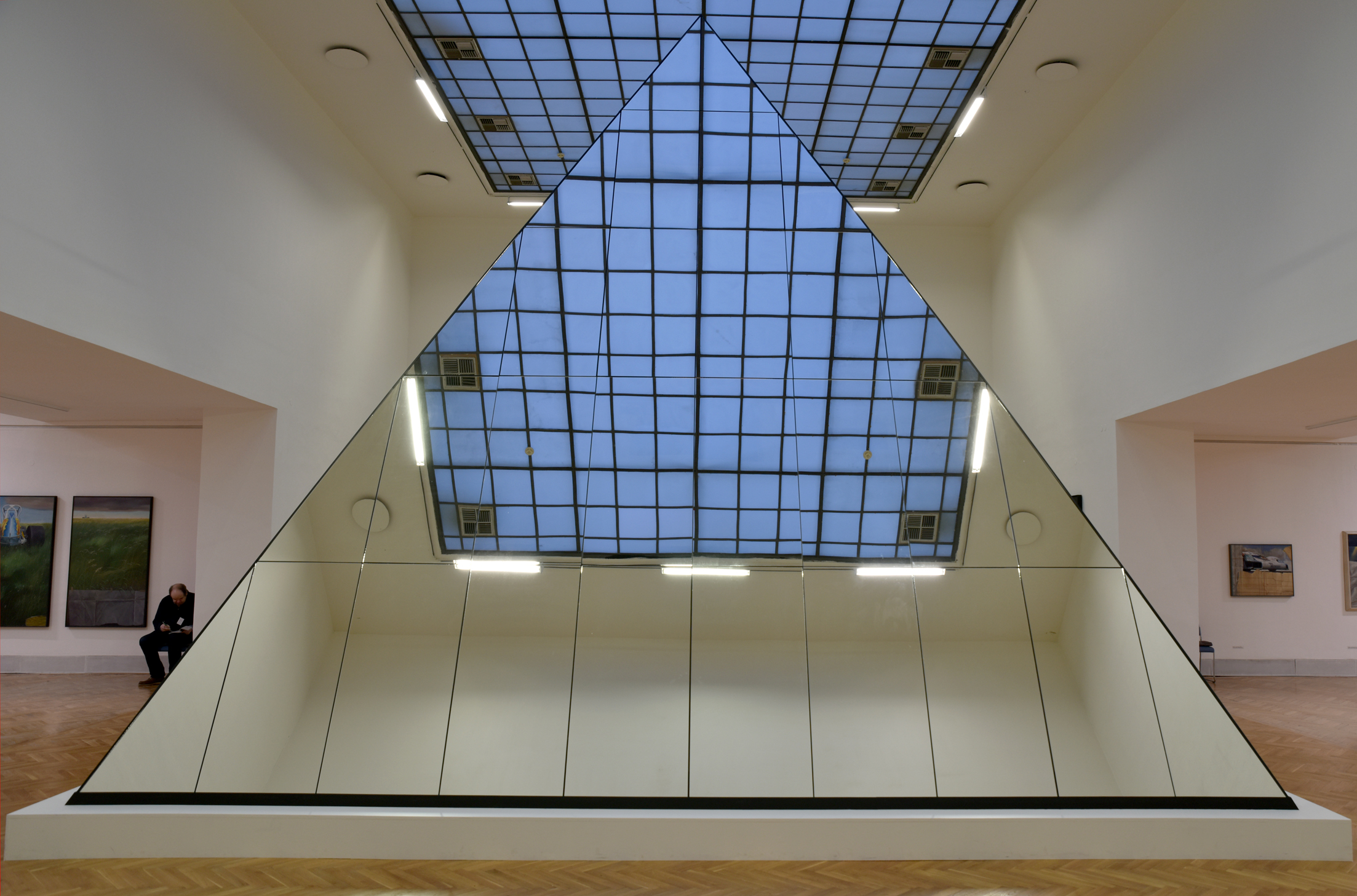
Pyramid

== Sources ==
=== Monographs ===
- Helena Musilová (ed.), Theodor Pištěk: Ecce homo, 168 s., Národní galerie v Praze 2012, ISBN 978-80-7035-508-4
- Jiří Šetlík, Jana Brabcová (ed.), Theodor Pištěk, 388 s., Galerie Pecka Praha 2007, ISBN 978-80-904008-0-1
- Jiří Šetlík, Theodor Pištěk, 24 s., Galerie hlavního města Prahy 1999, ISBN 80-7010-054-0
- Jindřich Chalupecký a kol., Theodor Pištěk, 140 s., Alšova jihočeská galerie v Hluboké nad Vltavou, Galerie hlavního města Prahy 1993
- Martin Dostál (ed.), Theodor Pištěk – Angelus, 168 s., Dům umění města Brna, KANT 2019, ISBN 978-80-7437-297-1

=== Bachelor's thesis ===
- Pavlína Doubravová, Hyperrealistické tendence v tvorbě Theodora Pištěka, bakalářská práce, FF a UDU JČU v Českých Budějovicích, 2012 On line

=== Catalogues ===
- Theodor Pištěk, 1978, Macourek Miloš, kat. 12 s., SČVU Praha
- Theodor Pištěk: Obrazy, kresby, film, 1982, Kotalík Jiří Tomáš, kat. 20 s., SČVU Praha
- Theodor Pištěk, 1984, Neumann Ivan, kat. 32 s., Galerie umění Karlovy Vary
- Theodor Pištěk: Obrazy, 1988, Janoušek Ivo, kat. 16 s., Ústřední kulturní dům železničářů, Praha
- Theodor Pištěk: Hluboká 93 – 94, 1995, Šetlík Jiří, kat. 48 s., AJG Hluboká nad Vltavou
- Theodor Pištěk, 2006, Machalický Jiří, kat. 10 s., Galerie Montanelli Praha
- 3x Theodor Pištěk, 2007, Machalický Jiří, Mládková Meda, kat. 20 s., Museum Kampa – Nadace Jana a Medy Mládkových, Praha
- Šedesátá, ed. Magdalena Juříková, Galerie Zlatá husa, Praha 2004, ISBN 80-239-3406-6, s. 308-313

=== Other (selection) ===
- Fascinace skutečností – hyperrealismus v české malbě / Fascination with reality – Hyperrealism in Czech painting, Muzeum umění Olomouc 2017, ISBN 9788088103219
- Příliš mnoho zubů / Too Many Teeth, Musilová Helena (ed.), kat. 147 s., Retro Gallery Praha, Praha 2017, ISBN 978-80-905877-8-6
- Postava k otvírání / The figure examined, Nováčková Zuzana, Štefančíková Alica, Svoboda Petr, kat. 132 s., Galerie Benedikta Rejta, Louny, Galerie výtvarného umění v Mostě, 2016
- Před obrazem, Dospěl Milan a kol., kat. 158 s., Galerie Kodl, Praha 2015, ISBN 978-80-200-2542-5
- Stavy mysli: Za obrazem / States of Mind: Beyond the Soubor: Stálá expozice GASK, David Bartoň a kol., kat. 208 s., Galerie Středočeského kraje (GASK), Kutná Hora 2014, ISBN 978-80-7056-185-0
- České moderní a současné umění 1890 – 2010: 2. díl, Dolanská Karolína a kol., kat. 189 s., Národní galerie v Praze 2010, ISBN 978-80-7035-447-6
- Šedesátá / The sixties ze sbírky Galerie Zlatá husa, Juříková Magdalena, Železný Vladimír, kat. 414 s., Galerie Zlatá husa, Praha 2004, ISBN 80-239-3406-6
- Hyperrealismus, Beran Zdeněk, Vítková Martina, kat. 31 s., Západočeská galerie v Plzni 2002, ISBN 80-85025-29-9
- Současná minulost: Česká postmoderní moderna 1960–2000, Tetiva Vlastimil, kat. 176 s., Alšova jihočeská galerie v Hluboké nad Vltavou 2000, ISBN 80-85857-37-5
- Umění zrychleného času: Česká výtvarná scéna 1958–1968, Alena Potůčková (ed.), kat. 147 s., České muzeum výtvarných umění, Praha 1999
- Umění zastaveného času / Art when time stood still: Česká výtvarná scéna 1969–1985, Alena Potůčková (ed.), kat. 268 s., České muzeum výtvarných umění, Praha 1996
- Skutečnost an iluze: Tendence českého radikálního realismu, Tetiva Vlastimil, 169 s., Alšova jihočeská galerie v Hluboké nad Vltavou 1993
- Forum '88, Hlaváček Josef, Kříž Jan, Nešlehová Mahulena, Petrová Eva, Šetlík Jiří, Wittlich Petr, kat. 96 s., neoficiální výstava v Pražské tržnici 1988
- Netvořice ´81, Hlaváček Josef, Kříž Jan, Šetlík Jiří, katalog neoficiální výstavní akce u Bedřich Dlouhého v Netvořicích 1981
- Czech stage costumes / Le costume tchèque de théâtre, Marešová Šimáčková Sylva, Bubeník Květoslav, Vejražka Vítězslav, Divadelní ústav, Praha 1972
