= Czechoslovak New Wave =

Filmmaking movement in 1960s Czechoslovakia

- Polish poster of Firemen's Ball by Miloš Forman
- Years active: 1960s
- Location: Czechoslovakia
- Major figures: Miloš Forman, Jiří Menzel, Věra Chytilová, Ivan Passer, Jan Němec, Jaromil Jireš
- Influences: Devětsil, political liberalization of Czechoslovakia leading up to the Prague Spring

The Czechoslovak New Wave (Note: Czech: Československá nová vlna; Slovak: Československá nová vlna) (also Czech New Wave (Note: Czech: České nová vlna; Slovak: Slovenská nová vlna)) is a term used for the Czechoslovak filmmakers who started making films in the 1960s. The directors commonly included are Miloš Forman, Věra Chytilová, Jan Švankmajer, Ivan Passer, Pavel Juráček, Jiří Menzel, Jan Němec, Jaromil Jireš, Evald Schorm, Hynek Bočan, Juraj Herz, Juraj Jakubisko, Štefan Uher, František Vláčil and others. The movement was sometimes called the "Czechoslovak film miracle".

== Overview ==
The films touched on themes which earlier filmmakers in communist countries had rarely managed to depict while avoiding the objections of censors, such as the misguided youths of Czechoslovak society portrayed in Miloš Forman's Black Peter (1963) and Loves of a Blonde (1965), or those caught in a surrealistic whirlwind in Věra Chytilová's Daisies (1966) and Jaromil Jireš' Valerie and Her Week of Wonders (1970). The films often expressed dark and absurd humour in opposition to the socialist realist films of the 1950s.

The Czechoslovak New Wave differed from the French New Wave in that it usually held stronger narratives, and as these directors were part of a nationalized film industry, they had greater access to studios and state funding. They also made more adaptations, including Jaromil Jireš's adaptation of Milan Kundera's novel The Joke (1969). At the Fourth Congress of the Czechoslovak Writers Union Svaz československých spisovatelů in 1967, Milan Kundera described this wave of national cinema as an important part of the history of Czechoslovak literature. Forman's The Firemen's Ball (1967), another major film of the era, remains a cult film more than four decades after its release.

== Czech film ==
The majority of films shot during the New Wave were Czech-language as opposed to Slovak. Many directors came from the prestigious FAMU, located in Prague, while the state-run Barrandov Studios were located just on the outskirts of Prague. Some prominent Czech directors included Miloš Forman, who directed The Firemen's Ball, Black Peter, and Loves of a Blonde during this time, Věra Chytilová who is best known for her film Daisies, and Jiří Menzel, whose film Closely Watched Trains (Ostře sledované vlaky 1966) won an Academy Award for Best Foreign Language Film in 1968.

== Slovak film ==
The Shop on Main Street (1965) won the Academy Award for Best Foreign Language Film in 1966, although it is not considered part of the New Wave, because it was directed by Ján Kadár and Elmar Klos, who were a generation older, and the film is fairly traditional. Juraj Herz, Juraj Jakubisko, Štefan Uher and Dušan Hanák were Slovak filmmakers who were part of the New Wave.

== Key works ==
- The Fabulous Baron Munchausen by Karel Zeman (1962)
- The Devil's Trap by František Vláčil (1962)
- The Sun in a Net by Štefan Uher (1963)
- Something Different by Věra Chytilová (1963)
- Black Peter by Miloš Forman (1963)
- The Cassandra Cat by Vojtěch Jasný (1963)
- The Cry by Jaromil Jireš (1964)
- Lemonade Joe, or The Horse Opera by Oldřich Lipský (1964)
- Diamonds of the Night by Jan Němec (1964)
- The Last Trick by Jan Švankmajer (1964)
- Loves of a Blonde by Miloš Forman (1965)
- Intimate Lighting by Ivan Passer (1965)
- The Shop On Main Street by Ján Kadár & Elmar Klos (1965)
- Pearls of the Deep by Jiří Menzel, Jan Němec, Evald Schorm, Věra Chytilová, Jaromil Jireš (1966)
- Closely Watched Trains by Jiří Menzel (1966)
- Daisies by Věra Chytilová (1966)
- A Report on the Party and the Guests by Jan Němec (1966)
- Marketa Lazarová by František Vláčil (1967)
- The Firemen's Ball by Miloš Forman (1967)
- The Return of the Prodigal Son by Evald Schorm (1967)
- The Valley Of The Bees by František Vláčil (1968)
- The Joke by Jaromil Jireš (1968)
- Capricious Summer by Jiří Menzel (1968)
- The Flat by Jan Švankmajer (1968)
- The Cremator by Juraj Herz (1969)
- Larks on a String by Jiří Menzel (1969)
- Birds, Orphans and Fools by Juraj Jakubisko (1969)
- Case for a Rookie Hangman by Pavel Juráček (1970)
- Valerie and Her Week of Wonders by Jaromil Jireš (1970)

== See also ==
- Barrandov Studios
- Cinema of the Czech Republic
- Cinema of Slovakia
- List of Czech films
- List of Slovak films
- Czechoslovakia 1968 - Oscar-winning 1968 American documentary short about Prague Spring
- The Unbearable Lightness of Being - 1988 Philip Kaufman film adaptation of the Milan Kundera novel about Prague Spring.

== Bibliography ==
- Hames, Peter (1985). The Czechoslovak New Wave. Wallflower Press. ISBN 978-1904764427.
- Škvorecký, Josef (1971). All The Bright Young Man and Women: A Personal History of the Czech Cinema. Peter Martin Assoc. ISBN 9780887781100.
- Owen, Jonathan (2011). Avant-garde to New Wave: Czechoslovak Cinema, Surrealism and the Sixties. Berghahn. ISBN 978-0857459015.
