= Adelheid (film) =

1970 Czechoslovak drama film

- Czech poster
- Directed by: František Vláčil
- Written by: Vladimír Körner; František Vláčil
- Based on: Adelheid by Vladimír Körner
- Starring: Petr Čepek; Emma Černá
- Cinematography: František Uldrich
- Edited by: Miroslav Hájek
- Music by: Zdeněk Liška
- Production companies: Filmové studio Barrandov; Kouzlo Films Společnost
- Distributed by: Ústřední půjčovna filmů
- Release date: 6 April 1970
- Running time: 99 minutes
- Country: Czechoslovakia
- Language: Czech

Adelheid is a 1970 Czechoslovak drama film directed by František Vláčil, based on a 1967 novel of the same name by Czech writer Vladimír Körner. The story is about the complicated relationship between Czech man Viktor and German woman Adelheid, and about relationships between Czechs and Germans in postwar Czechoslovakia in general.

== Plot ==
Discharged Czechoslovak lieutenant Viktor Chotovický (Petr Čepek) returns to his homeland after spending much of the war in Aberdeen, Scotland employed at a RAF desk job. He has been appointed the trustee of an empty manor formerly occupied by the German family of a notorious Nazi war-criminal imprisoned by the Czechoslovak authorities. Viktor meets the Nazi's beautiful daughter Adelheid Heidenmann (Emma Černá), who is forced to work as a cleaning lady at her own mansion. Her brother is an SS officer who allegedly disappeared in the Eastern Front. Viktor makes Adelheid his captive maid, and soon falls in love with her. His heart is torn between feelings of desire and his national identity and sympathies. Adelheid also slowly becomes sympathetic towards Viktor, but at the same time silently hopes for the return of her brother Hansgeorg. When he does Viktor narrowly escapes death. Viktor refuses to testify against Adelheid because he is alone and has nobody else. However, Adelheid commits suicide in her cell, Viktor walks off into the snow-covered countryside and is last seen wandering towards a mine field.

== Cast ==
- Petr Čepek as Viktor Chotovický
- Emma Černá as Adelheid Heidenmannová
- Jan Vostrčil as Officer Hejna
- Jana Krupičková as Czech Girl
- Pavel Landovský as Militiaman Jindra
- Lubomír Tlalka as Militiaman Karel
- Miloš Willig as Staff captain
- Karel Hábl as Lieutenant
- Zdeněk Mátl as Hansgeorg Heidenmann
- Alžběta Frejková as Old German woman
- Josef Němeček as Slovak
- Karel Bělohradský as Militiaman
- Vlasta Petříková as Woman

== Production ==
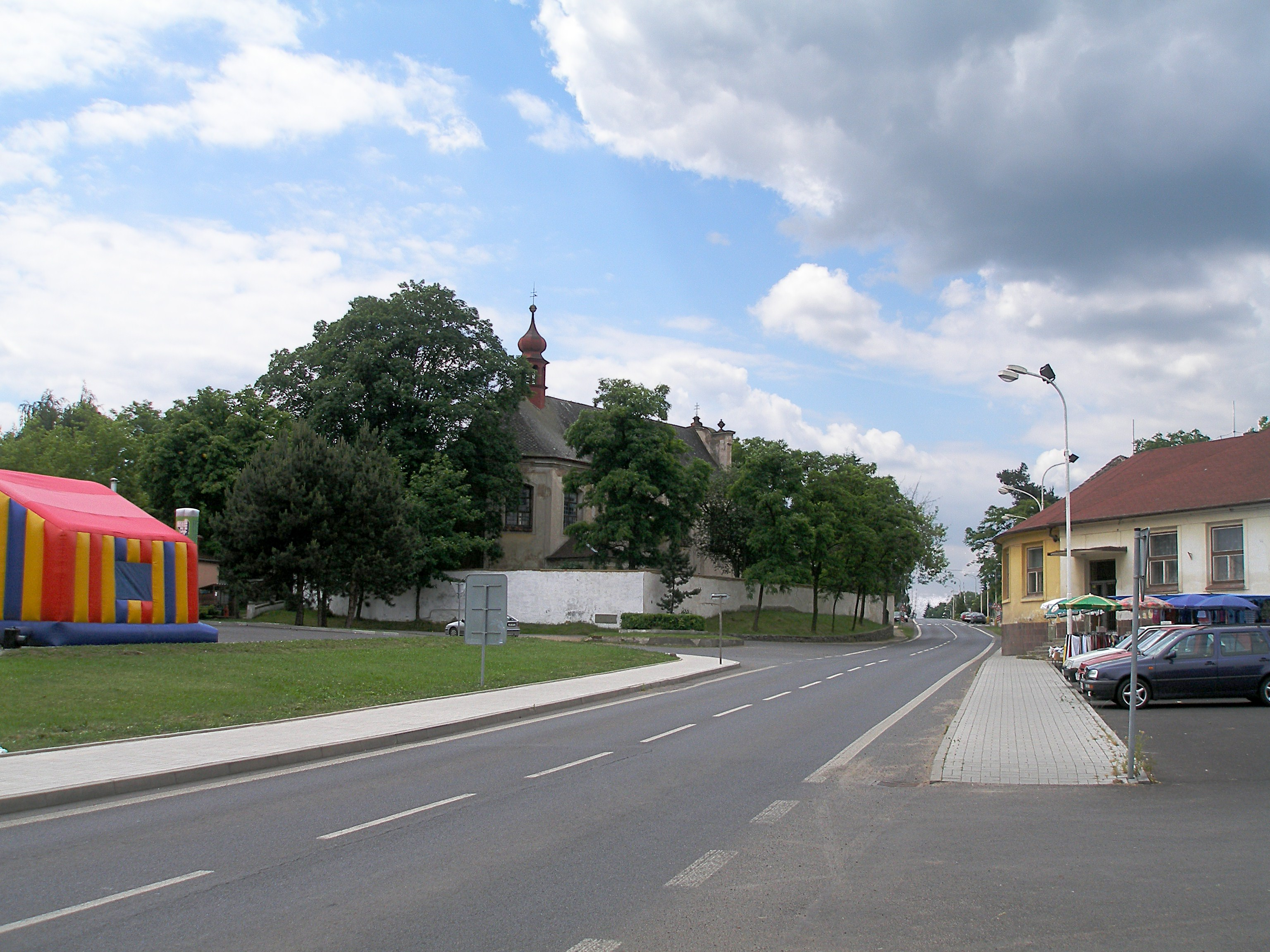
Town of Vroutek (German: Rudig), location of the Lužec castle from the film Adelheid

As in other novels by Körner, the story is set in Sudetenland in Northern Moravia. The movie was shot in Lužec castle located close the town of Vroutek (German: Rudig) in western Bohemia and in the villages close to Liberec in Northern Bohemia.

The soundtrack, adapted by Zdeněk Liška is based on existing music by Bach and Strauss, which complements the atmosphere of the film. The film was produced by Film Studio Barrandov Czechoslovakia in 1969.

== Reception ==
The film has received very positive reviews after its release in 1969. Many critics called it Vláčil's second best film (after Marketa Lazarová). The film wasn't taken pleasantly by authorities and it received limited release and propagation which resulted in a small attendance in cinemas.

=== Accolades ===
Date of ceremony	Event	Award	Result	Ref(s)
1969	20th Worker's Film Festival	The seal of Cheb	Won	
1970	Trutnov Film Festival for Youth	Golden Sun Award	Won	
1990	Finále Plzeň Film Festival	Kingfisher ex aequo	Won	
