= Dermacol =

Czech company

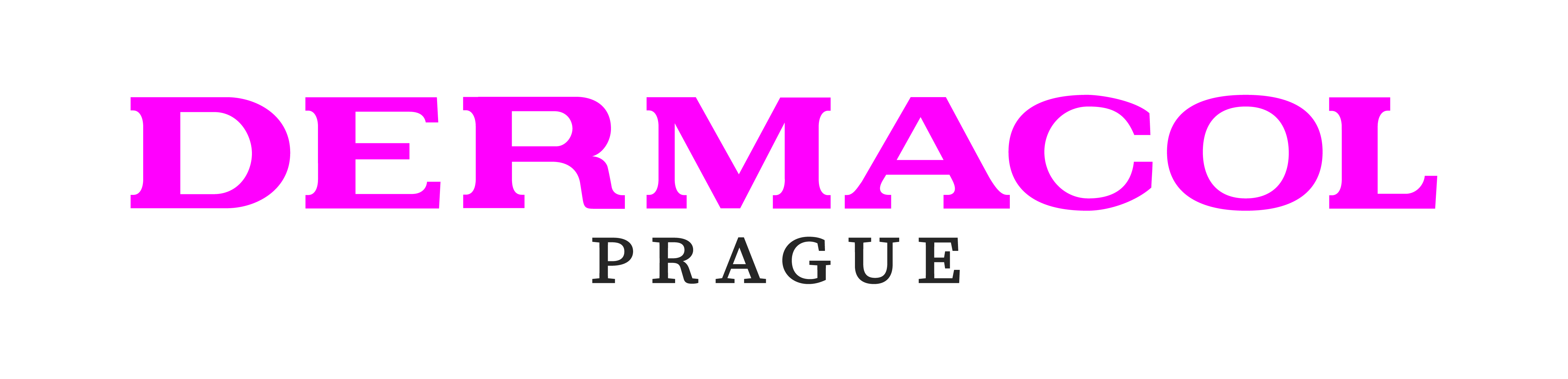
- Company type: joint-stock company
- Industry: Cosmetics
- Founded: 1966
- Founder: Olga Knoblochová
- Headquarters: Prague, Czech Republic
- Area served: Worldwide
- Key people: Věra Komárová, Vladimír Komár
- Revenue: 700 million CZK (2018)
- Website: eu.dermacol.cz

Dermacol is a Czech personal care company founded in 1966 in Prague. It is the leading Czech manufacturer and seller of make-up and decorative and skin cosmetics. In the 1960s, the company introduced one of the first make-up covers in Europe and in the world in general.

== History ==
Olga Knoblochová (1933–2023) from the Czechoslovak Institute of Medical Cosmetics was behind the expansion of the first make-up Dermacol, as well as Barrandov Film Studios, where they developed it and manufactured it until the 1990s. The word "Dermacol" became synonymous with make-up in general in then Czechoslovakia. The name originated from the Latin words derma (skin) and color = Dermacol.

In 1969, the film studios in Hollywood bought a license and produced licensed high cover makeup from Dermacol. The Dermacol line was then expanded by care cosmetics, make-up removers, body care products and cosmetics intended for all skin types. Dermacol Make-up Cover is still produced today, with around 3,000,000 pieces sold annually worldwide.

Dermacol is a family company today. It consists of a Czecho-Slovak couple – Věra Komárová, together with her husband Vladimír Komár, who have owned and managed the company since 1992. Today, the Dermacol brand is carried by about a thousand products, of which about 15 products have been manufactured according to the original recipe for more than 50 years. It is on sale in more than 70 countries.
