= Mág =

Mág may refer to:

- Mag (Hungarian: Mág), a village near the town of Săliște, Romania
- Magyar Általános Gépgyár Rt, Hungarian General Machine Factory
- Mág (film), a 1988 Czech film
