= František Vláčil =

Czech film director, painter, and graphic artist

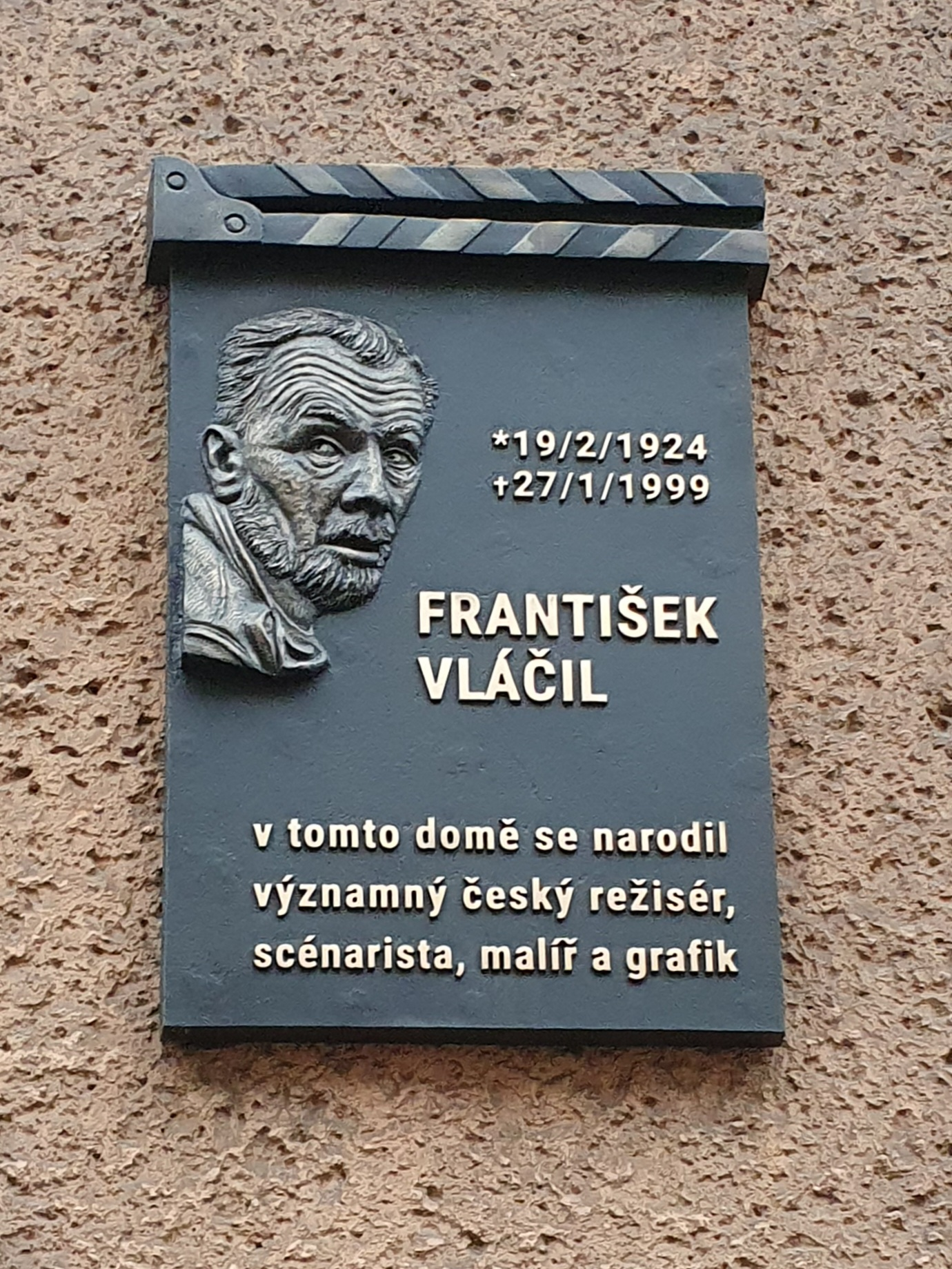
- Vláčil's memorial in Český Těšín
- Born: 19 February 1924; Český Těšín, Czechoslovakia (now Czech Republic)
- Died: 27 January 1999 (aged 74); Prague, Czech Republic
- Occupations: Actor, director, screenwriter
- Years active: 1951–1987
- Spouse: Věra Vláčilová

František Vláčil (19 February 1924 – 27 January 1999) was a Czech film director, painter, and graphic artist.

From 1945 to 1950, he studied aesthetics and art history at Masaryk University in Brno. Later, he worked in various groups and ateliers (e.g. on animated films), but his main focus became played film. His films are well known for high art quality. Vláčil was awarded many film prizes like the Prize of the International Film Festival 1998 in Karlovy Vary or the Czech Lion Prize for his longstanding contribution to world film culture. In 1998 Vláčil was voted the greatest Czech director of all time by a poll of Czech film critics. His film Marketa Lazarová is considered by some critics to be the best Czech film ever made.

== Biography ==
=== Early life ===
He spent childhood in north Moravia. He shortly studied Academy of Arts, Architecture and Design in Prague but switched to the faculty of Arts at Masaryk University. He finished his studies in 1951. He was interested in filmmaking during his studies and worked as a screenwriter in Brno Cartoon and puppet film studio. He later went to newly formed Studio of Popular Scientific and Educational Films. He made 4 short documentary films in the studio.

=== Military film ===
Vláčil worked in a studio of Czechoslovak military film during his compulsory military service. He was in the military from 1951 to 1958. He met with cinematographer Jan Čuřík with whom he frequently collaborated during his career. He also met another director Karel Kachyňa. Vláčil's short films made in the military studio were mostly instructory and propagandist. His first film was a 1953 short Vzpomínka that commemorated deceased communist president Klement Gottwald. Another of his film shorts is a documentary Posádka na štítě that is about meteorologists working on Lomnický štít. The film shows contrast between a man and mountains. Vláčil also participated in the filmmaking of other directors. In 1955, Vláčil participated as an adviser in the making of the war film, Tank Brigade, coordinating battle scenes. His last military short was an instructory and motivational film Sebeobrana. He also made a short film Clouds of Glass which is considered his finest creation while in the army. It is the only film that Vláčil made in the military and was not determined by politics or genre. Clouds of Glass won an award at the Documentary and Short Film Festival in Venice. Vláčil left the army in 1958.

=== Barrandov ===
Vláčil was employed at Barrandov Studios. He debuted with a short film "The Chase" (segment of No Entrance). The film is about two members of the border-guard who chase an enemy agent. The film not a regular story about the border-guard but features a strong focus on the beauties of nature. He made his first full-length film The White Dove in 1960, which was his only 'Big Three' film festivals' main competition nominee. The film received positive reviews and some awards. He made a historical film The Devil's Trap that was also a success. His next film was a historical drama Marketa Lazarová. He worked six years on the film. He collaborated with significant designers of costumes and decorations, Theodor Pištěk, Jan Koblasa and others. The film was highly acclaimed and was voted the all-time best Czech movie in a prestigious 1998 poll of Czech film critics and publicists. The film was also very expensive and Vláčil was forced to make The Valley of the Bees, another historical film. The Valley of the Bees used the same decorations so the expenditures of Markéta Lazarová could partially be repaid. The film starred Petr Čepek. Vláčil then worked with Čepek on his next film Adelheid.

During the Normalization era, Vláčil was not allowed to make feature films and had to leave Barrandov Studio. He made some shorts films such as Art Nouveau's Prague. He was allowed to make another full-length film in 1976, it was a drama Smoke on the Potato Fields. His next film, thriller Shadows of a Hot Summer, won a Crystal Globe.

Vláčil started to work with screenwriter Zdeněk Mahler and together they worked on some films. They made a biographical film Concert at the End of Summer. It was followed by other significant films Snake's Venom, Shades of Fern and Magician. These were his last films before he retired.

After Velvet Revolution, Vláčil received a number of awards. He won Czech Lion for Lifetime Work and Extraordinary Contribution to Czech Cinema and became the President of Czech Film and Television Academy. In 1997, Vláčil broke his left leg and was hospitalized. He was operated on but his operation was unsuccessful and had to be re-operated. The second operation was successful and he was allowed to leave hospital. He was only one day home when he fell into unconsciousness due to heart arrhythmia. He never recovered and died on 27 January 1999.

=== Problems with alcohol ===
When Vláčil started to make his own projects in the 1960s, he started heavily drinking. He believed that alcohol helped him in his work, helping him to reach his visions. His problems with alcohol worsened after he made Markéta Lazarová. After he finished the film, he looked "like a living skeleton". When he finished Adelheid, he collapsed. He underwent therapy and made Smoke on the Potato Field during a period of sobriety. Owing to the omission of his favourite scene from the film, because it was destroyed, Vláčil starts drinking again. His alcoholism was not helping his work anymore. He tried to fight his alcoholism by making Snake's Venom. Vláčil's alcoholism led him to lose his family and friends.

== Filmography ==
Year	Czech Title	English Title	Director	Writer	Length	Notes
1953	Létání bez vidu podle systému OSP	Flying Blind Using System OSP	Yes	Yes	49 minutes	Instructational colour film
1960	Vstup zakázán	No Entrance	Yes	Yes	77 minutes	Vláčil directed the segment "The Chase"
1960	Holubice	The White Dove	Yes	Yes	76 minutes	
1962	Ďáblova past	The Devil's Trap	Yes	No	85 minutes	Based on the novel Mlýn na ponorné řece by Alfréd Technik.
1967	Marketa Lazarová	Marketa Lazarova	Yes	Yes	165 minutes	Voted the all-time best Czech movie in a 1998 poll of Czech film critics and publicists.
1968	Údolí včel	The Valley of the Bees	Yes	Yes	97 minutes	
1970	Adelheid	Adelheid	Yes	Yes	99 minutes	
1973	Pověst o stříbrné jedli	The Legend of the Silver Fir	Yes	Yes	54 minutes	Inspired by a legend from the Beskydy Mountains.
1975	Sirius	Sirius	Yes	No	50 minutes	
1977	Dým bramborové natě	Smoke on the Potato Fields	Yes	Yes	95 minutes	
1978	Stíny horkého léta	Shadows of a Hot Summer	Yes	No	99 minutes	
1980	Koncert na konci léta	Concert at the End of Summer	Yes	No	102 minutes	Based on the life of Antonín Dvořák.
1981	Hadí jed	Snake's Venom	Yes	Yes	84 minutes	Inspired by Vláčil's struggle with alcohol.
1983	Pasáček z doliny	The Little Shepherd Boy from the Valley	Yes	No	90 minutes	Based on a novella by Antonín Fuks.
1985	Albert	Albert	Yes	No	70 minutes	Based on a short story by Leo Tolstoy.
1986	Stín kapradiny	Shades of Fern	Yes	Yes	90 minutes	Based on a novel by Josef Čapek
1988	Mág	Magician	Yes	No	87 minutes	Vláčil's last film. Based on the life of Karel Hynek Mácha

=== Short films ===
Year	Czech Title	English Title	Director	Writer	Length	Notes
1950	Hospodaření s elektřinou	Electricity Management	Yes	Yes	12 minutes	Propagation film
1950	Lék č. 2357	Cure N. 2357	Yes	Yes	14 minutes	
1951	Tepelná revoluce	Thermal Revolution	Yes	No		Educational film
1951	Úrazy elektřinou v průmyslu	Accidents by electricity in industry	Yes	No		
1953	Vzpomínka	Remembrance	Yes	Yes	19 minutes	
1956	Dopis z fronty	Letter from front	Yes	Yes	23 minutes	
1956	Posádka na štítě	Garrison in the Peak	Yes	Yes	13 minutes	
1957	Vojenská maturita	Military Graduation	Yes	Yes	16 minutes	
1958	Lesy našich vojenských prostorů	Forests of our Training Areas	Yes	Yes	9 minutes	Documentary
1958	Sebeobrana	Self-Defense	Yes	Yes	10 Minutes	
1958	Skleněná oblaka	Clouds of Glass	Yes	Yes	20 minutes	Vláčil's directorial debut.
1972	Město v bílém	The Town in White	Yes	Yes	15 minutes	
1973	Karlovarské promenády	The Promenades in Karlovy Vary	Yes	Yes	15 minutes	
1973	Vyprávěj mi o Praze	Tell Me About Prague	Yes	Yes	30 minutes	Documentary for Finnish television.
1974	Praha secesní	Art Nouveau's Prague	Yes	Yes	19 minutes	
1989	Pražský Odysseus	Prague's Odysseus	Yes	Yes	20 minutes	

=== Acting ===
Year	Czech Title	English Title	Notes
1959	Pět z milionu	Five of Million	Cameo as Franta.
1963	Spanilá jízda	Beautiful ride	Hejsek
1984	Slavnosti sněženek	The Snowdrop Festival	Cameo as an old man.
1985	Vesničko má středisková	My Sweet Little Village	Cameo as an old sick man named František who bears some traits similar to Vláčil.
1987	Potichu	Quietly	Student film, Vláčil's only main role.
1989	Rakovina vůle	Cancer of Will	

== Accolades ==
Date	Award	Category	Film	Result	Ref(s)
1960	Venice International Film Festival	Medal of the Biennial - Out of Competition	The White Dove	Won	
1960	Venice International Film Festival	Golden Lion	The White Dove	Nominated	
1962	Locarno Festival	Special recognition by film press	The Devil's Trap	Won	
1965	Artistic competition at 20th anniversary of Liberation of Czechoslovakia	The main award for feature-length film	The Devil's Trap	Won	
1965	Artistic competition at 20th anniversary of Liberation of Czechoslovakia	The main award for writing	Marketa Lazarová	Won	
1967	Trilobit Award	Best Director	Marketa Lazarová	Won	
1968	Mar del Plata International Film Festival	Best Film	Marketa Lazarová	Nominated	
1968	Mar del Plata International Film Festival	Little Condor for artistic and historical values	Marketa Lazarová	Won	
1968	Minister of Culture Award	Lyrical and artistically inventive work	Marketa Lazarová	Won	
1968	Klement Gottwald State Award	Writing and realisation	Marketa Lazarová	Won	
1968	Financial award for evaluation of Barandov Studio	The most successful film	Marketa Lazarová	Won	
1975	Gotwaldov Festival of films for Children	Special jury award for Direction	Sirius	Won	
1976	Festival of Czech and Slovak films in Brno	Artistic and emotionally impressve capture of atmosphere of resistance against Fascist terror	Sirius	Won	
1977	15th Festival of Czech and Slovak films	Special award for director	Smoke on the Potato Fields	Won	
1978	Karlovy Vary International Film Festival	Crystal Globe for the Best Film	Shadows of a Hot Summer	Won	
1979	Klement Gotwald State Awards		Shadows of a Hot Summer	Won	
1992	Karlovy Vary International Film Festival	Crystal Globe for the Best Film	Marketa Lazarová	Nominated	
1993	Czech Lion Awards	Lifetime Work and Extraordinary Contribution to Czech Cinema		Won	
