= Smoke on the Potato Fields =

1977 Czechoslovak film

- Movie poster
- Directed by: František Vláčil
- Written by: František Vláčil, Václav Nývlt
- Starring: Rudolf Hrušínský
- Cinematography: František Uldrich
- Edited by: Miroslav Hájek
- Music by: Zdeněk Liška
- Production company: Barrandov Studios
- Distributed by: Ústřední půjčovna filmů
- Release date: 1 April 1977
- Running time: 95 minutes
- Country: Czechoslovakia
- Language: Czech

Smoke on the Potato Fields (Czech: Dým bramborové natě, literally, "the smoke of potato haulm") is a 1977 Czechoslovak film directed by František Vláčil. It stars Rudolf Hrušínský. The film is an adaptation of Bohumil Říha's novel Doktor Meluzin.

== Plot ==
The movie opens in an airport abroad, as the middle-aged Dr. Meluzin and his wife are parting. He has decided to return to his native Czechoslovakia, in search of himself, or of a self that he used to be; his wife is remaining behind. Meluzin takes a job as a primary care physician at a health center in the small village of Větrov. He is given a modest room in an apartment that belongs to the health center, which he is to share with a young couple named Kodet. The villagers are at first a little suspicious of Meluzin, and he unsure of his place with them. His first patient, an old man, flees when asked to undress for his exam, and the nurse assigned to work with Meluzin seems dismayed when he insists on maintaining medical records for the patients. He is standoffish, and apparently disapproving when the ambulance driver takes him along on a detour to visit the ambulance driver's girlfriend, an impulsive young redhead named Markéta Zitová. When Meluzin lights a fire in a field, one autumn afternoon, in order to roast potatoes that he's been given for dinner, a villager yells at him to extinguish it. His return to his childhood homeland doesn't seem to be going well.

On strolls to the cemetery, however, he befriends the village sexton, who jestingly calls him a "colleague," and he also befriends his neighbor Pavla Kodetová, a schoolteacher, after she lights a fire for him one day in the Franklin stove in his room and invites him into her kitchen for lívance (pancakes), which reminds him of his mother, who made them with bilberries when he was a child. Her husband, Petr Kodet, somewhat younger than she is, remains suspicious of Meluzin, however, especially after Meluzin detects tension between the couple. Despite his suspicion, Petr confesses to the doctor that he and his wife haven't been able to have a child and asks for medical help. Meluzin declines to examine Pavla, claiming that she ought to see a specialist, but perhaps also protecting a somewhat melancholy but romantic attachment that is forming between him and her. He pointedly recommends that she bring Petr to be examined by a fertility specialist, too, when she goes for her appointment. It turns out that the infertility is Petr's, news that confirms Petr in his distrust of Meluzin. Petr leaves his wife.

Meluzin, meanwhile, has gradually become more accepted by the villagers. He diagnoses a congenital defect in a co-worker's young son, and an operation cures the boy. He becomes involved, too, in the life of Markéta, the ambulance driver's girlfriend, whose eccentric mother has become reclusive and antisocial on account of a government plan to build a highway through her duck farm and home. Markéta confides to Meluzin that she is pregnant. She refuses to name the father and asks for an abortion, which Meluzin declines to perform. After Markéta's mother finds out about the pregnancy, Meluzin stops the woman from chasing her daughter with a hatchet, and he arranges for the girl to stay with his neighbor Pavla. Concerned that the villagers will talk about the irregular family that they have formed, Meluzin quietly finds another apartment for himself. In the sixth month of Markéta's pregnancy, Meluzin discovers that Markéta's pregnancy will be risky to her, and sends her to a maternity hospital in a nearby city.

Missing the company of her new friend Pavla, Markéta runs away from the maternity hospital on foot one night, walking all the way back to Větrov. Pavla is surprised to find Markéta in her apartment, in pain, and realizing that she is going into labor, fetches the nurse. By the time Meluzin arrives, Markéta has already given birth to a healthy girl, with the nurse's assistance, but Markéta's own state is critical. In the rickety village ambulance, whose windshield wipers don't quite work, Meluzin and the nurse drive her and the baby through a storm, but they don't manage to reach the city hospital in time to save Markéta. In a coda, Meluzin finds Petr Kodet driving a bulldozer—he has taken a construction job on the highway that threatens the home of Markéta's mother—and persuades him to return to his wife; Petr and Pavla will adopt Markéta's daughter.

== Cast ==
- Rudolf Hrušínský as Doctor Meluzin
- Věra Galatíková as Pavla Kodetová
- Jana Dítětová as Simonová
- Marie Logojdová as Markéta
- Vítězslav Jandák as Ota
- Josef Somr as Vlach
- Alois Švehlík as Kodet

== Reception ==
=== Accolades ===
Date of ceremony	Award	Category	Recipients	Result	Ref(s)
1977	15th Festival of Czech and Slovak films	Special award for director	František Vláčil	Won	
