= No Entrance =

- Directed by: Frantisek Vlácil; Milan Vošmik
- Written by: Rudolf Kalčík, František Vláčil, Jaroslav Klíma
- Starring: Zdeněk Kutil, Jan Němec, Vladimír Hrubý, Jiřina Švorcová
- Cinematography: Jan Čuříkm Ján Cifra, Josef Novotný
- Production company: Barrandov Studios
- Release date: 20 May 1960
- Running time: 77 minutes
- Country: Czechoslovakia
- Languages: Czech; Slovak

No Entrance (Czech: Vstup zakázán) is a 1960 Czechoslovak film directed by František Vláčil and Milan Vošmik. The film consists of two segments - The Chase (directed by Vláčil) and The Wandering (directed by Vošmik). Both segments are stories from the life of Czechoslovk border guard.

== Plot ==
=== The Chase ===
Young Border Guard accompanies Sergeant Major Border Guard on a patrol. They find tracks in the snow and follow them. They are met with a snowstorm and become separated. Sergeant Major falls asleep, but wakes up when he hears gunshots. He finds Young Border Guard shot. He gets him to a rural house where a young woman lives. She tells him about a suspicious man who was there. Sergeant Major goes after the saboteur and catches him as the Young Border Guard dies.

=== The Wandering ===
Lieutenant Štěpánek lives with his family in a village in Šumava, near the border. Štěpánek's wife Jiřina doesn't like it there and wants to return inland. Štěpánek doesn't want to leave his job and is unhappy with his wife's lamentations. Their son Péťa adores his father. One day, Jiřina starts to pack up when Štěpánek is on duty. Péťa runs away when he finds out his father wouldn't go with them. Everybody in the village then helps to find Péťa, and Jiřina decides to stay.

== Cast ==
=== The Chase ===
- Zdeněk Kutil as Sergeant Major Border Guard
- Jan Němec as Young Border Guard
- Václav Irmanov as Saboteur
- Valentina Thielová as Rural Woman

=== The Wandering ===
- Vladimír Hrubý as Lieutenant Štěpánek - border guard
- Jiřina Švorcová as Jirina - Štěpánek's wife
- Míša Staninec as Péťa - Štěpánek's son
- Ota Sklenčka as Captain
- Otto Lackovič as Varga
- Světla Amortová as Součková
- Hermína Vojtová as Endlová
- František Miška as Officer
- Adolf Filip as Forester
