= Petr Čepek =

Czech actor (1940–1994)

- Born: 16 September 1940; Prague, Protectorate of Bohemia and Moravia
- Died: 20 September 1994 (aged 54); Vrchlabí, Czech Republic
- Resting place: Dolní Kalná
- Occupation: Actor
- Years active: 1961–1994

Petr Čepek (16 September 1940 – 20 September 1994) was a Czech actor. He was among the founders of The Drama Club theatre in Prague, where he played from 1965 until his death. He also had dozens of film roles, and he won the Czech Lion Award for Best Actor in Leading Role for his dual role in Faust (1994). His appearance often led him to play negative roles.

== Life ==
Petr Čepek was born on 16 September 1940 in Prague. His mother had a musical education and his father loved theatre. In 1942, his brother Karel was born, who later also became a theatre actor. Petr Čepek spent his childhood and adolescence in Ostrava, where his family moved after his father's death. At the age of thirteen, he made his first appearance in the theatre, in an amateur performance.

Čepek studied acting at Theatre Faculty of the Academy of Performing Arts in Prague (DAMU) at the same class as Ladislav Mrkvička, Josef Abrhám and Jiří Krampol. He left school shortly before graduating, as a protest against the expulsion of his friend Mrkvička. He then returned to Ostrava and became a member of the Bezruč Theatre. There he became a member of a group of artists around the director Jan Kačer, which went to Prague in 1965 and founded The Drama Club. Čepek played there until the end of his life.

Čepek was a heavy smoker. In 1988, he bought a house in Horní Kalná, where he went on weekends, but gradually moved there permanently. Here he met the Czechoslovak president Václav Havel and participated in the establishment of the Civic Forum. However, he soon left this political movement and returned not only to acting, but also to teaching at DAMU, from which he additionally received a university diploma. In mid-1993, he began to suffer from pain and underwent surgery for a tumor. He died of pancreatic cancer in the Vrchlabí hospital on 20 September 1994, aged 54. He is buried in Dolní Kalná.

Čepek was married three times. His second wife was the actress Helena Lišková and they had a daughter Petra, who was born in 1972 shortly after their marriage. In his third marriage, he had the second daughter, Kristýna, born in 1987.

Čepek was known for his deep sense of honour, his natural authority, his courage to resist the Czechoslovak authoritarian regime, his sense of humor, and his willingness to help others. This contradicted his appearance, which often led him to play negative roles. He was also praised for his loyalty to The Drama Club, preferring a homely environment over the more lucrative acting in more prestigious theatres. He refused an engagement at the National Theatre and the title of Merited Artist, awarded by the state during the times of communist Czechoslovakia.

== Filmography ==
- Dva z onoho světa (1961)
- Hotel for Strangers (1966)
- The End of Agent W4C (1967)
- The Valley of the Bees (1967)
- Ohlédnutí (1968)
- Adelheid (1969)
- Ezop (1969)
- I Killed Einstein, Gentlemen (1969)
- Nahota (1970)
- Oil Lamps (1971)
- The Death of Black King (1971)
- Morgiana (1972)
- Návraty (1972)
- Motiv pro vraždu (1974)
- Škaredá dědina (1975)
- Koncert pre pozostalých (1976)
- Súkromná vojna (1977)
- Past na kachnu (1978)
- Poplach v oblacích (1978)
- Tajemství Ocelového města (1978)
- Diagnóza smrti (1979)
- Cutting It Short (1980)
- The Hit (1980)
- Noční jazdci (1981)
- Upír z Feratu (1982)
- Jára Cimrman ležící, spící (1983)
- O statečném kováři (1983)
- Putování Jana Amose (1983)
- The Snowdrop Festival (1983)
- Tři veteráni (1983)
- Prodloužený čas (1984)
- Dissolved and Effused (1984)
- Všichni musí být v pyžamu (1984)
- My Sweet Little Village (1985)
- Hry pro mírně pokročilé (1986)
- Kdo se bojí, utíká (1986)
- Krajina s nábytkem (1986)
- Smích se lepí na paty (1986)
- Mág (1987)
- Dobří holubi se vracejí (1988)
- Prokletí domu Hajnů (1988)
- Devět kruhů pekla (1989)
- Cesta na jihozápad (1989)
- Kainovo znamení (1989)
- Muka obraznosti (1989)
- Skřivánčí ticho (1989)
- Byli jsme to my? (1990)
- Křížová vazba (1990)
- Svědek umírajícího času (1990)
- The Elementary School (1991)
- Thanks for Every New Morning (1994)
- Faust (1994)

== Honours ==
In 1994, Čepek won the Czech Lion Award for Best Actor in Leading Role for his dual role in Faust. It was awarded to him in memoriam.
