= Jan Čuřík =

Czech cinematographer

- Born: 1 November 1924; Prague, Czechoslovakia
- Died: 4 December 1996 (aged 72); Prague, Czech Republic
- Occupation: Cinematographer
- Years active: 1951-1989

Jan Čuřík (1 November 1924 – 4 December 1996) was a Czech cinematographer whose work was featured in many Czechoslovak films.

== Biography ==
Jan Čuřík was born in Prague, Czechoslovakia. He began working as a camera assistant in Krátký film Praha. Later he filmed short films and documentaries for the Army. In 1958, he served as cameraman for Zbyněk Brynych's Suburban Romance, which was Czechoslovakia's entry in the 1958 Cannes Film Festival.

He often worked with director Jaromil Jireš, and was the cinematographer for many of his most popular films, including The Joke, and Valerie and her Week of Wonders. He also frequently worked with Zbyněk Brynych and Karel Kachyňa. In 1961, he worked on The Gleiwitz Case in East Germany. In 1966, he co-directed Searching with Antonín Máša.

== Selected filmography ==
- 1955: The Tank Brigade
- 1958: Suburban Romance
- 1960: The White Dove
- 1961: The Gleiwitz Case
- 1962: Transport from Paradise
- 1963: Joseph Kilian
- 1963: Something Different
- 1964: Courage for Every Day
- 1966: Searching
- 1969: The Joke
- 1970: Valerie and her Week of Wonders
- 1972: And Give My Love to the Swallows
- 1973: Lovers in the Year One
- 1975: The Day That Shook the World
- 1979: Love Between the Raindrops
- 1984: The Nurses

== Awards ==
- Valerie and her Week of Wonders – Silver Hugo for Best Color Cinematography at 1971 Chicago International Film Festival
- The White Dove – Medal of the Biennale - Out of Competition at 21st Venice International Film Festival
