= Shades of Fern =

- Movie poster
- Directed by: František Vláčil
- Written by: Vladimír Körner, František Vláčil
- Produced by: Vladimír Vojta
- Starring: Marek Probosz, Zbigniew Suszyński, Miroslav Macháček
- Cinematography: František Uldrich
- Edited by: Miroslav Hájek
- Music by: Jiří F. Svoboda
- Production company: Barrandov Studios
- Distributed by: Ústřední půjčovna filmů
- Release date: 1 January 1986
- Running time: 90 minutes
- Country: Czechoslovakia
- Language: Czech

Shades of Fern (Czech: Stín kapradiny) is a 1985 Czechoslovak crime film directed by František Vláčil. It is based on a novella by Josef Čapek of the same name.

== Plot ==
Rudolf works in a quarry and likes to illegally hunt in a local forest. He is often accompanied by his friend Václav. One day, they are caught by a Gamekeeper and they murder him. They hide the body and run away. They are seen by an older couple and realize they have to leave the village. They are hiding in forest and are trying to avoid police. Vašek becomes sick and Rudolf wants to leave him behind but Václav goes on. They meet Rousová and try to rape her but she escapes. They are later found by Policeman Marjánka and Rudolf shoots him. Sensitive Václav is scared of Rudolf's brutality. they are surrounded by police and Rudolf is killed. Václav is hiding at his body whole night. He kills himself in the morning before policemen can arrest him.

== Cast ==
- Marek Probosz as Rudolf Aksamit
- Zbigniew Suszyński as Václav Kala
- Miroslav Macháček as Gamekeeper/Vagabund/Beggar
- František Peterka as Father Aksamit
- Vladimír Hlavatý as Čepelka
- Milada Ježková as Čepelka's wife

== Reception ==
=== Accolades ===
Date of ceremony	Event	Award	Recipient(s)	Result	Ref(s)
1986	Festival of Czech and Slovak films in Mariánské Lázně	Music Award	Jiří F. Svoboda	Won	
