= The Legend of the Silver Fir =

- Movie poster
- Directed by: František Vláčil
- Written by: Vladimír Körner, František Vláčil
- Produced by: Dušan Schaffer
- Starring: Maroš Kramár, Július Vašek
- Narrated by: Zdeněk Kryzánek
- Cinematography: František Uldrich
- Edited by: Antonín Štrojsa
- Music by: Zdeněk Liška
- Production company: Krátký Film Gottwaldov
- Distributed by: Ústřední půjčovna filmů
- Release date: 28 December 1973
- Running time: 54 minutes
- Country: Czechoslovakia
- Language: Czech

The Legend of the Silver Fir (Czech: Pověst o stříbrné jedli) is a 1973 Czechoslovak film directed by František Vláčil.

== Plot ==
There is a legend that someone who will do something good, will see Silver trees. Young boy Ondra sees such trees on a painting. The painting shows Silver trees, a man falling down and a Watch hanging from a tree One day a Seed Coater Lojzek comes to Ondra's parents. Ondra's father Slávek is an old friend of Lojzek and used to be Seed Coater too. Lojzek moves in a Cabin in the Mountains and invites Slávek to help him coating. Slávek takes Ondra with him. They show the job to Ondra and he wants to do it too. Slávek has to return home and leaves Ondra with Lojzek. Ondra becomes Lojzek's helper. One day Lojzek met an old Gamekeeper who remembers Lojzek's father Cyril who died while coating Seed from a frozen tree. The painting was made to Cyril's memory. Ondra sees frozen Trees and they seem to him as Silver. He climbs up one of them even though Lojzek wants him to come down. Suddenly branches break and Ondra falls. Lojzek manages to catch him but is injured. His father's watch is broken. He gives it to Ondra and tells him to show it to Slávek. Ondra hurries home and shows the watch to Slávek. Slávek realizes that some accident happened. They hurry to Lojzek. Lojzek doesn't say that his injury is Ondra's fault and Slávek assumes that Lojzek fell off tree. Lojzek then leaves but might return next year. The film ends when Ondra finally sees Silver trees.

== Cast ==
- Maroš Kramár as Ondra
- Július Vašek as Lojzek Hojgr
- Lubomír Kostelka as Slávek
- Jana Hliňáková as Jarka
- Jiří Hálek as the Teacher
- Ladislav Gzela as the Gamekeeper

== Reception ==
=== Accolades ===
Date of ceremony	Event	Award	Result	Ref(s)
1974	Gotwaldov Festival of films for Children	Special Jury Award	Won	
1974	Gijón International Festival of films for Children	Jury Award of International Catholic Film Central	Won	
