= Snake's Venom =

- Poster of the film
- Directed by: František Vláčil
- Written by: Irena Charvátová, František Vláčil
- Starring: Josef Vinklář, Ilona Svobodová
- Cinematography: František Uldrich
- Edited by: Miroslav Hájek
- Music by: Luboš Fišer
- Production company: Barrandov Studios
- Distributed by: Ústřední půjčovna filmů
- Release date: 1 February 1982
- Running time: 84 minutes
- Country: Czechoslovakia
- Language: Czech

Snake's Venom (Czech: Hadí jed) is a 1982 Czechoslovak drama film directed by František Vláčil. It stars Josef Vinklář. The film focuses on theme of alcoholism. The film follows 18-years student Vlaďka who tries to help her father Jan Veselý with alcoholism.

== Plot ==
The film follows young student Vlaďka. Her mother recently died and she never met her father. She decides to meet him. She finds him on Geologic research where he lives in a caravan. She reveals to him that she is his daughter. Father isn't enthusiastic, but they grow closer to each other. Vlaďka stays and meets her father's friends and environment he lives in. She finds out that her father has problems with alcohol and often changes partners. His reputation is not good. He is a broken man who lost all illusions and ideals. She tries to help him to change his lifestyle, but he is unable to overcome his problems with alcohol. It leads to arguments between them and Vlaďka leaves. She leaves a note saying that they can meet again when he stops drinking. Everything returns to old tracks.

== Cast ==
- Josef Vinklář as Jan Veselý
- Ilona Svobodová as Vlaďka Novotná
- Ferdinand Krůta as Dědek
- Karel Heřmánek as Péťa
- Miriam Kantorková as Mácová
- Josef Žluťák Hrubý as Tonek
- Jan Hrušínský as Martin
