= Shadows of a Hot Summer =

- Movie Poster
- Directed by: Frantisek Vlácil
- Written by: Jiří Křižan
- Starring: Juraj Kukura
- Cinematography: Ivan Šlapeta
- Edited by: Miroslav Hájek
- Music by: Zdeněk Liška
- Production company: Barrandov Studios
- Distributed by: Bontonfilm (2008)
- Release date: September 15, 1978
- Running time: 99 min
- Country: Czechoslovakia
- Language: Czech

Shadows of a Hot Summer (Czech: Stíny horkého léta) is a 1978 Czechoslovak thriller film by František Vláčil. The film won a Crystal Globe award at the Karlovy Vary International Film Festival in 1978.

== Cast ==
- Juraj Kukura as Ondřej Baran
- Marta Vančurová as Tereza Baranová
- Gustáv Valach as Pavel Valchar
- Robert Lischke as Lukáš Baran
- Karel Chromík as Ukrainian Lieutenant
- Zdeněk Kutil as "Old"
- Jiří Bartoška as "White-haired"
- Augustín Kubán as "Bald"
- Gustav Opočenský as injured Ukrainian
- Ilja Prachař as Lieutenant Grygar
- Michal Ladižinský as Drunk

== Plot ==
The film is set in the 1940s after the end of World War II. Ondřej Baran lives with his family in Beskydy, at a homestead in the mountains. One day five members of the Ukrainian Insurgent Army come to their house. One of them is injured and the Ukrainians want to hide in the house until he recovers. They take the family as hostages and force Ondřej to bring a doctor to the house. They threaten Ondřej that if he appeals for help they will kill his family. Ondřej eventually realises that he has to deal with them by himself. He kills all the Ukrainians, but one of them shoots him and he dies. The film ends with Ondřej's funeral.

== Reception ==
=== Accolades ===
Date of ceremony	Event	Award	Recipient(s)	Result	Ref(s)
1978	Karlovy Vary International Film Festival	Crystal Globe for the Best Film	František Vláčil	Won	
1978	29th Worker's Film Festival	The Main Award		Won	
1978	29th Worker's Film Festival	Czechoslovak Film Critic's Award		Won	
1978	29th Worker's Film Festival	The Best Actress	Marta Vančurová	Won	
1978	Bánská Bystrica Film Festival for Youth	Great Golden Sun for the Best Film		Won	
1978	Bánská Bystrica Film Festival for Youth	Golden Sun for the Best Actor	Juraj Kukura	Won	
1978	Festival of Czech and Slovak Films in České Budějovice	Award of Czechoslovak Film		Won	
1979	Klement Gotwald State Awards		František Vláčil	Won	
1979	Survey of Květy Journal for the most popular actor and actress of Socialist countries	Golden Bloom for the Best Actress	Marta Vančurová	Won	
