= Sirius (1975 film) =

- Movie poster
- Directed by: Frantisek Vlácil
- Written by: Jan Stibral, Kamil Pixa
- Starring: Michal Vavruša
- Cinematography: František Uldrich
- Edited by: Antonín Štrojsa
- Music by: Zdeněk Liška
- Production company: Krátký Film Gottwaldov
- Distributed by: Ústřední půjčovna filmů
- Release date: 1 November 1975
- Running time: 50 minutes
- Country: Czechoslovakia
- Language: Czech

Sirius is a 1975 Czechoslovak war drama film directed by František Vláčil. The film has won many awards. It was Vláčil's last film before returning to feature-length films.

== Plot ==
The film is the story of 12-year-old Fanek and his dog Sirius. They play together every day. One day German train is destroyed by local resistance and Germans decide to confiscate the dogs of local folks. Fanek doesn't want to give up Sirius and hides him in the woods. One day, Sirius escapes from his fence. Fanek asks the gamekeeper for help. He can do only one thing: shoot Sirius.

== Cast ==
- Michal Vavruša as Fanek
- Jana Hlaváčková as Fanek's Mother
- Vladimír Jedenáctík as Gamekeeper
- Karel Chromík as Fanek's Father
- Karel Hábl as SS Officer
- Bořivoj Navrátil as Gestapo Officer

== Reception ==
=== Accolades ===
Date of ceremony	Event	Award	Result	Ref(s)
1975	Teheran International Film Festival for Children	Golden Statuette for the best film	Won	
1975	Gotwaldov Festival of films for Children	Special jury award for Direction	Won	
1975	Gotwaldov Festival of films for Children	Socialist Youth Union Committee Award	Won	
1975	Gotwaldov Festival of films for Children	Special recognition	Won	
1975	Festival of Children's films in České Budějovice	Children's Audience Award	Won	
1976	Festival of Czech and Slovak films in Brno	Artistic and emotionally impressve capture of atmosphere of resistance against Fascist terror	Won	
1976	International Competition of Children's Films Gijón	Diploma for participation	Won	
