= The Devil's Trap =

- Movie poster
- Directed by: František Vláčil
- Based on: Mlýn na ponorné řece by Alfréd Technik
- Produced by: Věra Kadlecová
- Starring: Vítězslav Vejražka; Miroslav Macháček; Vít Olmer
- Cinematography: Rudolf Milič
- Music by: Zdeněk Liška
- Production company: Barrandov Studios
- Distributed by: Ústřední půjčovna filmů
- Release date: 20 April 1962
- Running time: 89 minutes
- Country: Czechoslovakia
- Language: Czech

The Devil's Trap (Czech: Ďáblova past) is a 1962 Czechoslovak historical film directed by František Vláčil. It was inspired by Alfréd Technik's novel Mlýn na ponorné řece. It is considered the first part of a loose trilogy of historical films by Vláčil, the others being Marketa Lazarová and The Valley of the Bees.

The film's main theme is the conflict between religion and science. Religion is represented by a fanatical Jesuit priest, while science is represented by an old miller and his son. Vláčil wanted the film to depict the 17th century as authentically as possible.

== Plot ==
The film is set in the early 17th century. The Regent of Valeč dislikes Spálený, the local miller, whom local people greatly respect. Spálený knows the local lands well, but his family is suspected of witchcraft due to an incident that occurred generations before. When Swedish soldiers arrive and plunder the land, they also burn the mill, but Spálený and his family miraculously survive. Probus, a fanatical priest, is invited to investigate Spálený. Probus unsuccessfully tries to turn the local people against Spálený. Probus and the Regent then attempt to capture Spálený, but he disappears into a cave complex under the mill. Probus and the Regent try to find him, but they cause a landslide. Only Spálený's son Jan and his girlfriend Martina survive.

== Cast ==
- Vítězslav Vejražka as Spálený
- Miroslav Macháček as Probus
- Vít Olmer as Jan
- Čestmír Řanda as a Regent
- Karla Chadimová as Martina
- Vlastimil Hašek as Gamekeeper Filip

== Reception ==
=== Accolades ===
Date of ceremony	Event	Award	Result	Ref(s)
1962	Locarno Festival	Special recognition by film press	Won	
1965	Artistic competition at 20th anniversary of Liberation of Czechoslovakia	Main award for feature-length film	Won	
