= Suburban Romance =

1958 film

- Directed by: Zbyněk Brynych
- Written by: Zbyněk Brynych; Vladimír Kalina
- Starring: Jana Brejchová
- Cinematography: Jan Čuřík
- Edited by: Miroslav Hájek
- Release date: 1958
- Country: Czechoslovakia
- Language: Czech

Suburban Romance (Czech: Žižkovská romance) is a 1958 Czechoslovak romance film directed by Zbyněk Brynych. It was entered into the 1958 Cannes Film Festival.

== Cast ==
- Jana Brejchová
- Eduard Cupák
- František Kreuzmann
- Václav Lohniský as Poláček
- Antonín Novotný as Karel Freit
- Václav Poláček
- Svatopluk Skládal
- Eva Svobodová as Jarošová
- Jiří Vála
