= Věra Galatíková =

Czech actress (1938–2017)

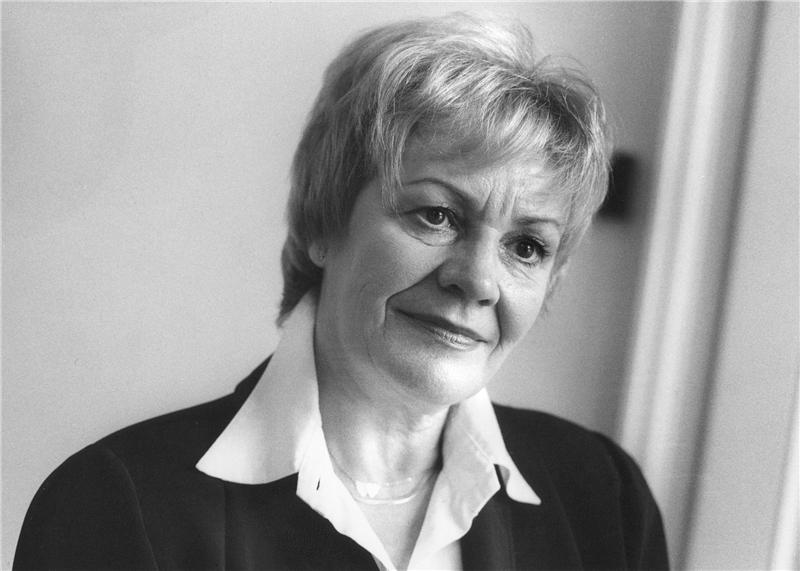
- Věra Galatíková
- Born: 19 August 1938; Zlín, Czechoslovakia
- Died: 21 December 2007 (aged 69); Kladno, Czech Republic
- Occupation: Actress
- Years active: 1962–2005

Věra Galatíková (19 August 1938 – 21 December 2007) was a Czech actress.

== Life and career ==
Galatíková was born on 19 August 1938 in Zlín. She acted in Pardubice following her studies at the Janáček Academy of Music and Performing Arts. Galatíková then joined The Drama Club in Prague, where she performed between 1967 and 1972, later performing in other Prague venues including the National Theatre. At the 1994 Thalia Awards she won the category of Best Actress in a Play. Galatíková was recognised at the 2000 František Filipovský Awards for her work in film voice dubbing.

Galatíková died of cancer in 2007.

== Selected filmography ==
- The Valley of the Bees (1967)
- All My Compatriots (1968)
- Smoke on the Potato Fields (1977)
- Jako kníže Rohan (1983)
- Andel Exit (2000)
