= The Joke (film) =

- Directed by: Jaromil Jireš
- Screenplay by: Jaromil Jireš; Milan Kundera
- Based on: The Joke; 1967 novel by Milan Kundera
- Produced by: Miloš Stejskal
- Starring: Josef Somr; Jana Dítětová; Luděk Munzar
- Cinematography: Jan Čuřík
- Edited by: Josef Valušiak
- Music by: Zdeněk Pololáník
- Release date: 1969
- Running time: 81 minutes
- Country: Czechoslovakia
- Language: Czech

The Joke (Czech: Žert) is a 1969 Czechoslovak film by director Jaromil Jireš. It is considered one of the last films of the Czech New Wave movement.

Based on Milan Kundera's 1967 novel of the same name, The Joke tells the story of Ludvík Jahn, a man expelled from the Czechoslovak Communist Party for an idle joke to his girlfriend, and the revenge he later seeks through adultery. The film was produced during the political liberalization of the 1968 Prague Spring and contains many scenes which satirize and criticize the country's communist leadership. Amos Vogel wrote that the film was "possibly the most shattering indictment of totalitarianism to come out of a Communist country".

== Plot ==
The scientist Ludvík Jahn returns to his hometown after two decades away. He is interviewed by Helena, an attractive older woman whom he begins to seduce. Jahn then discovers Helena is married to Pavel, an old rival.

Jahn flashes back to his college days and his love for Markéta, a devout believer in communism. In an attempt to make the humorless Markéta lighten up, Jahn sends her a postcard reading "Optimism is the opium of mankind. A 'healthy spirit' stinks of stupidity. Long live Trotsky! Yours, Ludvík". Markéta turns the postcard over to the Party, however, and Jahn is brought before a Party hearing to answer for his words. Pavel, a friend who had pledged to help him, calls in the meeting for Jahn's expulsion from the college and the Communist Party, and Markéta joins the vote against him.

Jahn then undergoes six years of "reeducation", which are split between prison and army service in a technical auxiliary battalion under a sadistic drill sergeant. While in the army, Alexej, a true believer in communism, appeals to higher authorities against their treatment; when the man is consequently expelled from the Party, he commits suicide.

In the present, Jahn successfully seduces Helena, motivated more by a desire for revenge on Pavel than attraction to her. Though Helena falls in love with him, he discovers that she and Pavel have long been estranged, and Pavel has a new lover of his own. The only person hurt by Jahn's attempt at revenge is Helena.

== Cast ==
- Josef Somr as Ludvík Jahn
- Jana Dítětová as Reporter Helena Zemánková
- Luděk Munzar as Pavel Zemánek
- Jaroslava Obermaierová as Markéta Pospíšilová
- Evald Schorm as Laboratory assistant Kostka
- Věra Křesadlová as Věra Brožová, Zemánek's girlfriend
- Jaromír Hanzlík as Commander
- Michal Pavlata as Technician Jindra Tkadlečka

== Production ==
The character Pavel Zemánek was inspired by Pavel Kohout. Jireš wanted to cast him in the movie, but eventually decided to cast a professional actor Luděk Munzar. In the role of prisoner Alexej, Jireš cast a pastor and later Charter 77 spokesman Miloš Rejchrt. The film was shot in Prague, Uherské Hradiště, Olomouc, Most and Vlčnov.

== Reception ==
The Joke was released in 1969, some months after the August 1968 Warsaw Pact invasion of Czechoslovakia had put an end to the freedoms of the Prague Spring. Though it was a success in theaters, authorities banned it for the next twenty years, making it "one of the New Wave's most renowned casualties".

The film was released on VHS in 2002 by Facets Video and on DVD in 2012 by the Criterion Collection's Eclipse line.

Criterion essayist Michael Koresky described the film as "the definitive take on the Stalinist era in Czechoslovakia". Cineaste stated that The Joke was "a modest, quiet film" that was "permeated with irony", though its ironic juxtapositions were occasionally heavy-handed, such as cutting between a group singing the revolutionary song "No More Masters" and Jahn and other prisoners breaking rocks in a quarry.
