= 21st Venice International Film Festival =

Italian film festival in 1960

- Location: Venice, Italy
- Founded: 1932
- Awards: Golden Lion: Tomorrow Is My Turn
- Festival date: 24 August – 7 September 1960
- Website: Website

Venice Film Festival chronology
- 22nd 20th

The 21st annual Venice International Film Festival was held from 24 August to 7 September 1960.

French writer Marcel Achard was the Jury President for the main competition. The Golden Lion was awarded to Tomorrow Is My Turn directed André Cayatte.

== Jury ==
- Marcel Achard, French writer - Jury President
- Peter Baker, British film critic
- Luis García Berlanga, Spanish filmmaker
- Sergei Bondarchuk, Soviet filmmaker and actor
- Louis Chauvet, French writer and journalist
- Antonio Pagliaro, Italian philosopher of language
- Jaime Potenze, Argentinian film critic
- Mario Praz, Italian film critic
- Samuel Steinman, American film critic
- Jerzy Toeplitz, Polish film scholar
- Arturo Tofanelli, Italian writer

== Official Sections ==
The following films were selected to be screened:

=== Main Competition ===
English title	Original title	Director(s)	Production country
Adua and Her Friends	Adua e le compagne	Antonio Pietrangeli	Italy
The Apartment		Billy Wilder	United States
Atomic War Bride	Rat	Veljko Bulajic	Yugoslavia
Baltic Skies	Балтийское небо	Vladimir Vengerov	Soviet Union
Brainwashed	Schachnovelle	Gerd Oswald	West Germany
The White Dove	Holubice	František Vláčil	Czechoslovakia
The Human Condition I: No Greater Love	第一部 純愛篇／第二部 激怒篇	Masaki Kobayashi	Japan
Knights of the Teutonic Order	Krzyzacy	Aleksander Ford	Poland
Long Night in 1943	La lunga notte del '43	Florestano Vancini	Italy
Rocco and His Brothers	Rocco e i suoi fratelli	Luchino Visconti	Italy, France
Silver Spoon Set	I delfini	Francesco Maselli	Italy
Stowaway in the Sky	Le Voyage en ballon	Albert Lamorisse	France
Tomorrow Is My Turn	Le Passage du Rhin	André Cayatte	France
Tunes of Glory		Ronald Neame	United Kingdom

=== Out of Competition ===
English title	Original title	Director(s)	Production country
Black Tights	1-2-3-4 ou Les Collants noirs	Terence Young	France, Portugal
Pollyanna		David Swift	United States

=== Informativa ===
English title	Original title	Director(s)	Production country
Ben-Hur		William Wyler	United States
Bernadette of Lourdes	Il suffit d'aimer	Robert Darène	France
Be True Until Death	Légy jó mindhalálig	László Ranódy	Hungary
A Certain Major	Alázatosan jelentem	Mihály Szemes	Hungary
Ceneri della memoria		Alberto Caldana	Italy
El Cochecito		Marco Ferreri	Spain
Culpable		Hugo del Carril	Argentina
Higher Principle	Vyssí princip	Jiří Krejčík	Czechoslovakia
Irohanihoheto	いろはにほへと	Noboru Nakamura	Japan
Kapo		Gillo Pontecorvo	Italy
Key Witness		Phil Karlson	United States
El Lazarillo de Tormes		César Fernández Ardavín	Spain
Leili i Medzhnun	Лейли и Меджнун	Tatyana Berezantseva, Gafor Valamatzade	Soviet Union
Mad Years	Les années folles	Mirea Alexandresco, Henri Torrent	France
Maria Stuart		Alfred Stöger	West Germany
Maribel and the Strange Family	Maribel y la extraña familia	José María Forqué	Spain
Never on Sunday	Pote tin Kyriaki	Jules Dassin	Greece
Pay or Die		Richard Wilson	United States
A Secret Rendezvous	密会	Kô Nakahira	Japan
Shadows		John Cassavetes	United States
Toro negro		Benito Alazraki	Mexico
Towards Ecstasy	Vers l'extase	René Wheeler	France
Trapped by Fear	Les distractions	Jacques Dupont	France
Vento del sud		Enzo Provenzale	Italy
The Wedding Day	Baishey Shravana	Mrinal Sen	India
When a Woman Ascends the Stairs	女が階段を上る時	Mikio Naruse	Japan

== Official Awards ==
- Golden Lion: Tomorrow Is My Turn by André Cayatte
- Special Jury Prize: Rocco and His Brothers by Luchino Visconti
- Volpi Cup for Best Actor: John Mills for Tunes of Glory
- Volpi Cup for Best Actress: Shirley MacLaine for The Apartment
- Best First Work: Long Night in 1943 by Florestano Vancini

== Independent Awards ==
=== San Giorgio Prize ===
- The Human Condition: No Greater Love by Masaki Kobayashi

=== FIPRESCI Prize ===
- El Cochecito by Marco Ferreri
- Rocco and His Brothers by Luchino Visconti

=== OCIC Award ===
- Stowaway in the Sky by Albert Lamorisse

=== Pasinetti Award ===
- The Human Condition: No Greater Love by Masaki Kobayashi
  - Parallel Sections: Shadows by John Cassavetes

=== Lion of San Marco ===
- The Musicians by Kazimierz Karabasz
