= Zánik samoty Berhof =

1973 book by Vladimír Körner

First edition

Zánik samoty Berhof is a Czech novel, written by Vladimír Körner. It was first published in 1973.
