= The Flat (1968 film) =

- Directed by: Jan Švankmajer
- Written by: Jan Švankmajer
- Produced by: Erna Kmínková; Jirí Vanek
- Cinematography: Svatopluk Malý
- Edited by: Hana Walachová
- Music by: Zdeněk Liška
- Production company: Krátký film Praha
- Release date: 1968
- Running time: 13 minutes
- Country: Czechoslovakia

The Flat (Czech: Byt) is a 1968 Czech surrealist short film directed by Jan Švankmajer. The film features no dialogue, only music by Zdeněk Liška.

== Plot ==
A man gets trapped in an old apartment. Objects in the apartment revolt against him and he can't use them. A man with a rooster enters the apartment and hands him an axe. He destroys the door with the axe, only to find a white wall with names written on it. He adds his name to the wall.

== Cast ==
- Ivan Kraus as Josef
- Juraj Herz as man with a rooster
