= Rocco Scotellaro =

Italian poet and writer

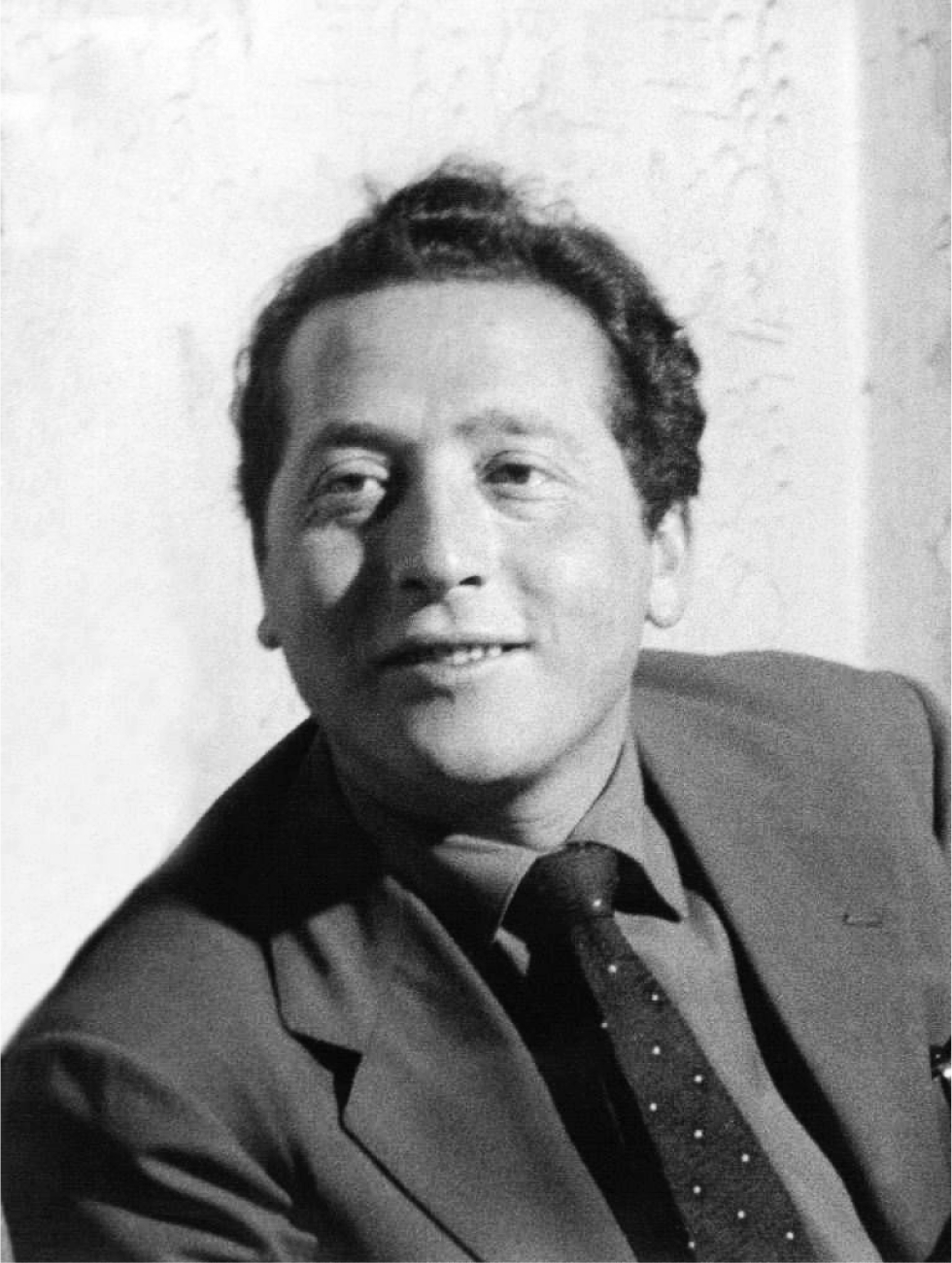
- Born: 19 April 1923; Tricarico, Province of Matera, Italy
- Died: 15 December 1953 (aged 30); Portici, Province of Naples, Italy
- Occupation: Writer

Rocco Scotellaro (19 April 1923 – 15 December 1953) was an Italian poet, writer and politician.

== Life and career ==
Born in Tricarico, in the Province of Matera, the son of a shoemaker and a homemade seamstress, Scotellaro studied law at the Universities of Rome, Naples and Bari without graduating, as the early death of his father forced him to return to his hometown. In December 1943 he joined the Italian Socialist Party, and after having been part of the local department of National Liberation Committee in 1946 he became mayor of Tricarico. His tenure as mayor was inspired by the theories of vita activa by Hannah Arendt, and spent a great deal of effort in improving the living conditions of his fellow citizens.

On 8 February 1950 Scotellaro was arrested for an alleged extortion; the subsequent trial acquitted him "for not having committed the fact and because the fact does not constitute an offence", and in their sentence the judges explicitly referred to the case as motivated by "a political vengeance", but as a consequence a then disillusioned Scotellaro left his office and his hometown. He then collaborated with the Agrarian Economics Observatory and with the Association for the Industrial Development of Southern Italy (SVIMEZ), studying various projects and reforms.

Scotellaro suddenly died of a heart attack on 15 December 1953, at the age of 30. Almost all his literary works were published posthumously, and earned him critical acclaim as well as various prizes and awards, including the Viareggio Prize in 1954. His style belongs to New Realism, and Eugenio Montale described him as a "poeta contadino" ("peasant poet") and paired him to Sergei Yesenin and Attila József.

== In popular culture ==
- Upon his death, poet Amelia Rosselli composed the heartfelt collection Cantilena (poesie per Rocco Scotellaro) (1953) in his memory.
- Luchino Visconti's 1960 film Rocco and His Brothers pays homage to Scotellaro in its title.
- In 1979, he was portrayed by Bruno Cirino in the Rai Due television film Rocco Scotellaro, which depicted his life.
