= Rocco and His Brothers =

1960 Italian epic melodrama

- Italian theatrical release poster
- Italian: Rocco e i suoi fratelli
- Directed by: Luchino Visconti
- Screenplay by: Suso Cecchi D'Amico; Pasquale Festa Campanile; Massimo Franciosa; Enrico Medioli; Luchino Visconti
- Story by: Luchino Visconti; Suso Cecchi d'Amico; Vasco Pratolini
- Based on: Il ponte della Ghisolfa by Giovanni Testori
- Produced by: Goffredo Lombardo
- Starring: Alain Delon Renato Salvatori Annie Girardot Katina Paxinou Roger Hanin Paolo Stoppa Suzy Delair Claudia Cardinale
- Cinematography: Giuseppe Rotunno
- Edited by: Mario Serandrei
- Music by: Nino Rota
- Production company: Titanus Les Films Marceau
- Distributed by: Titanus (Italy) Marceau-Cocinor (France)
- Release dates: 6 September 1960 (Venice); 7 October 1960 (Italy); 10 March 1961 (France)
- Running time: 177 minutes
- Countries: Italy; France
- Language: Italian
- Box office: 2,173,480 admissions (France); $11,328 (2007 Italian re-release)

Rocco and His Brothers (Italian: Rocco e i suoi fratelli) is a 1960 epic melodrama film directed by Luchino Visconti and starring Alain Delon, Annie Girardot, Renato Salvatori, Katina Paxinou, Roger Hanin, Paolo Stoppa, and Claudia Cardinale in one of her early roles. Set in 1960 Milan, it tells the story of a migrant family from southern Italy and its disintegration in the society of the industrial north.

The film's title is a combination of the title of Thomas Mann's novel Joseph and His Brothers and Rocco Scotellaro, an Italian poet who described the feelings of the peasants of southern Italy. The screenplay, co-written by Visconti, is inspired by an episode from the novel Il ponte della Ghisolfa by Giovanni Testori.

A co-production between Italian studio Titanus and French production company Les Films Marceau, Rocco and His Brothers suffered from multiple controversies and setbacks in its pre-release period. It received a lukewarm response from Italian critics, but was more positively-received internationally, winning several accolades including the Special Jury Prize at the 21st Venice International Film Festival. Retrospective reviews were more positive, and the film is now highly regarded in the canon of Italian cinema.

In 2008, the film was included on the Italian Ministry of Cultural Heritage’s 100 Italian films to be saved, a list of 100 films that "have changed the collective memory of the country between 1942 and 1978."

== Plot ==
After the death of his father, Rocco Parondi, one of the five sons of a poor rural Italian family, travels north from Lucania with his widowed mother Rosaria and three of his brothers—Simone, Ciro, and Luca—to the industrial city of Milan. They expect to stay with Vincenzo, the eldest brother, in the Milan suburb of Lambrate, but the family of Vincenzo's fiancee, Ginetta, object to the presence of the unschooled and unemployed southerners, and the Parondis end up in an unheated basement. After Ginetta becomes pregnant by Vincenzo and they marry, Vincenzo sees little of his mother and four brothers, who have to make their own way.

Simone, the second brother, struggles to adapt to urban life. He becomes attracted to a prostitute named Nadia, who urges him to pursue a career in boxing, which his mother also encourages, as a fast way to achieve fame and wealth. Though he falls in love with Nadia and demands more than a casual relationship, she rejects him after returning jewelry he stole from Rocco's boss for her.

Rocco, the third brother, is called up for military service. Near the end of his enlistment, he runs into Nadia, who has just finished a prison sentence for prostitution. His innocence and purity of heart inspires her to give up her way of life and enter an exclusive relationship with him. When Simone learns of this, he attacks Rocco and Nadia with a gang of friends and rapes Nadia to "teach Rocco a lesson". Not having realized how much their relationship would hurt his brother, Rocco breaks up with Nadia and encourages her to return to Simone, which she eventually does, though only to try to hasten his downfall.

Ciro, the second-youngest brother, attends night school and finds steady work at the Alfa Romeo factory. He tries his best to help make his family a success in their new hometown, and becomes engaged to a local woman from a good family.

Rocco often acts to preserve the well-being of his family members at some cost to his own happiness. He frequently covers for Simone, in particular, such as when he returns the jewelry that Simone stole from his employer, or when, after Simone's obsession with Nadia has ended his boxing career by causing him to spiral into alcoholism and a generally dissolute lifestyle, Rocco agrees to sign a ten-year boxing contract in order to pay back Simone's debts, including to a homosexual man he robbed under compromising circumstances.

While Rocco is fighting in a championship bout, Simone visits Nadia, who has returned to working as a prostitute, near the Ponte della Ghisolfa (it) and kills her after she tells him how much she hates him. Rocco wins the fight, and, during the celebration with his family, he expresses a desire to return to their home in Lucania someday, and his mother indicates that she misses having all of her sons together. A bloody Simone interrupts the party and confesses to Nadia's murder. Rocco, despite his anguish, still wants to protect Simone, but Ciro refuses to go along and leaves to alert the police.

The youngest brother, Luca, does little most of the time other than watch as events unfold around him. Ηe visits Ciro at work to say that Simone has been caught and invite Ciro home for dinner. Luca says he would like to return south with Rocco. Ciro responds that he does not think Rocco will ever make it back home, and that, although Luca could, he would not find it the same as it was due to the progress that will inevitably, eventually affect every place. While many people fear the changing world, Ciro says he does not. He says Luca will live a better life because of the changes. He turns to go back to work and Luca walks away. In a long shot, we see Luca passing a newspaper stand, where he sees Rocco's picture in an article about the many far-flung cities in which he has upcoming fights, and then moving away towards the city.

== Cast ==
- Alain Delon as Rocco Parondi
- Renato Salvatori as Simone Parondi
- Annie Girardot as Nadia
- Katina Paxinou as Rosaria Parondi
- Alessandra Panaro as Franca, Ciro's fiancée
- Spiros Focás as Vincenzo Parondi
- Max Cartier as Ciro Parondi
- Corrado Pani as Ivo, one of Simone's friends
- Rocco Vidolazzi as Luca Parondi
- Claudia Mori as Raffaella, a laundry worker
- Adriana Asti as Giannina, a laundry worker
- Enzo Fiermonte as the boxing coach
- Nino Castelnuovo as Nino Rossi, one of Simone's friends
- Rosario Borelli as the manager of the gambling den
- Renato Terra as Alfredo, Ginetta's brother
- Roger Hanin as Duilio Morini
- Paolo Stoppa as Tonino Cerri, the boxing impresario
- Suzy Delair as Luisa, the owner of the laundry
- Claudia Cardinale as Ginetta, Vincenzo's fiancée

== Production ==
Rocco and His Brothers was filmed in Milan during the spring of 1960. Locations included Piazza del Duomo, the Milan Cathedral, and the Milano Centrale railway station. Other scenes were shot in Rome, Bellagio, and Civitavecchia. Renato Salvatori (Simone) and Annie Girardot (Nadia) romantically eloped during filming; they got married two years later.

The film's controversial subject matter caused several setbacks. Filming permits were denied for multiple locations that had previously been approved, such as when provincial premier Adrio Casati learned that the climactic murder scene was to be filmed in a large recreational area in Idroscalo. Casati claimed the scene bore an "inopportune resemblance to reality", as a young prostitute had recently been murdered in the area. Visconti moved shooting to Lazio, and the scene was filmed at Lago di Fondi.

During post-production, Visconti re-dubbed and re-edited the film to change the name of the main family from "Pafundi" to "Parondi" after a local judge named Pafundi, who had heard rumors about the film's content and did not want anyone to think it was about him, threatened to sue the producers.

== Release and reception ==
=== Censorship ===
On October 27, 1960, twenty days after the film opened in Italy, its release was blocked and the negative was seized after Domenico Tardini, the Cardinal Secretary of State, requested that Italian officials take action against "certain destructive films". It was decided that, unless four scenes, including the murder of Nadia, were cut, the film would be confiscated and the producer prosecuted. After negotiations, producer Goffredo Lombardo agreed to darken the criticized scenes with filters, and two of these darkened scenes were later omitted entirely; Visconti was not informed of these changes. The deleted scenes were restored for later home video releases.

=== Box office ===
The film was the 27th most popular film of the year in France. It sold 10,220,365 tickets in Italy.

=== Critical response ===
For The New York Times, Bosley Crowther, gave the film a positive review in which he praised the direction and acting:

"A fine Italian film to stand alongside the American classic, The Grapes of Wrath, opened last night... It is Luchino Visconti's Rocco and His Brothers (Rocco e i suoi fratelli), and it comes here garlanded with laurels that are quite as appropriate in this context as they are richly deserved... Signor Visconti has clearly conceived his film and that is what his brilliant handling of events and characters makes one feel. There's a blending of strong emotionalism and realism to such an extent that the margins of each become fuzzy and indistinguishable... Alain Delon as the sweet and loyal Rocco...is touchingly pliant and expressive, but it is Renato Salvatori...who fills the screen with the anguish of a tortured and stricken character. His raw and restless performance is overpowering and unforgettable...[and the] French actress Annie Girardot is likewise striking as the piteous prostitute."

Variety lauded the drama, and wrote: "With all its faults, this is one of the top achievements of the year in Italy... Scripting shows numerous hands at work, yet all is pulled together by Visconti's dynamic and generally tasteful direction. Occasionally, as in the near-final revelation to the family of Simone's crime, the action gets out of hand and comes close to melodrama. Yet the impact of the main story line, aided by the sensitive, expertly guided playing of Alain Delon as Rocco, Annie Girardot as Nadia, and Renato Salvatori as Simone, is great. Katina Paxinou at times is perfect, at others she is allowed to act too theatrically and off-key."

Stanley Kauffmann of The New Republic wrote that he found the film "distended, sententious, ostentatiously frank, fundamentally trite, and thematically unsuccessful".

=== Retrospective reviews ===
When the film was released in DVD format, critic Glenn Erickson wrote: "A major pleasure of Rocco and His Brothers is simply seeing its portrait of life in working-class Milan in 1960. Beautifully directed in the housing projects and streets of the city, this is a prime example of a film which will accrue historical interest simply because it shows so much of how people lived and what places looked like (now) 40 years ago."

Art historian Timothy James Clark expressed in 2023 his admiration for the film, pointing out the fertile final shot:

[O]ne of the things I admire about the end of Rocco and His Brothers (1960) by Visconti, ... [is] in the end, [where] after the brothers’ agony in Milan, [it] is the Party member, the good brother, the upstanding family man who adjusts to industrial society - and in the final minutes you see him going off to his home in the suburb. In a sense, Visconti is saying that that is the ending. Aren’t the other brothers, the maladjusted brothers, all portrayed as crazed – as killers? But where does the movie leave you – dramatically, aesthetically? On the good brother’s side?

Gian Luca Farinelli, president of the Cinema Ritrovato film festival, shared that view:

The final, extreme long-shot of Luca walking away from the gates of the Alfa Romeo factory and from the progressive speeches of his employed brother Ciro, seems to leave no doubt as to what Visconti really thinks: encapsulated in progress devoid of history, like the great Renaissance paintings we see entrapped inside the television screen, Italy, and what remains of the Parondi family, are moving towards a future without roots or beauty.

Martin Scorsese included the film on his list of "39 foreign films to see before you die", and Francis Ford Coppola cited Rocco and His Brothers as an inspiration for The Godfather (1972). In 2008, Roger Ebert added Rocco to his "Great Movies" list.

Madonna said she named her son Rocco because this is one of her favourite films.

== Awards and nominations ==
Award	Year	Category	Nominee(s)	Result
BAFTA Awards	1962	Best Film From Any Source		Nominated
BAFTA Awards	1962	Best Foreign Actress	Annie Girardot	Nominated
Bodil Award	1962	Best European Film	Luchino Visconti	Won
Cahiers du Cinéma	1961	Top 10 List	Luchino Visconti	4th place
David di Donatello	1961	Best Production	Goffredo Lombardo	Won (tied with Dino De Laurentiis for Everybody Go Home)
Nastro d'Argento	1961	Best Director	Luchino Visconti	Won
Nastro d'Argento	1961	Best Producer	Goffredo Lombardo	Nominated
Nastro d'Argento	1961	Best Screenplay	Luchino Visconti, Pasquale Festa Campanile, Suso Cecchi d'Amico, Enrico Medioli	Won
Nastro d'Argento	1961	Best Story	Luchino Visconti, Vasco Pratolini, Suso Cecchi d'Amico	Nominated
Nastro d'Argento	1961	Best Supporting Actor	Paolo Stoppa	Nominated
Nastro d'Argento	1961	Best Cinematography (B&W)	Giuseppe Rotunno	Won
Nastro d'Argento	1961	Best Production Design	Mario Garbuglia	Nominated
Nastro d'Argento	1961	Best Costume Design	Piero Tosi	Nominated
Sant Jordi Award	1962	Best Film of the Year	Luchino Visconti	Nominated
Sant Jordi Award	1962	Best Foreign Actress	Annie Girardot	Won
Venice Film Festival	1960	Golden Lion	Luchino Visconti	Nominated
Venice Film Festival	1960	Special Jury Prize	Luchino Visconti	Won
Venice Film Festival	1960	FIPRESCI Prize	Luchino Visconti	Won

== In popular culture ==
The German artist collective Rocco und seine Brüder take their name from the film.
