= Clouds of Glass =

1958 film

- Directed by: Frantisek Vlácil
- Written by: František Vláčil
- Produced by: Jaroslav Matějka
- Starring: Antonín Zíb
- Cinematography: Josef Vaniš
- Edited by: Jiří Sobotka
- Music by: Miloš Vacek
- Production company: Czechoslovak Military Film
- Release date: 1958
- Running time: 20 minutes
- Country: Czechoslovakia
- Language: Czech

Clouds of Glass (Czech: Skleněná oblaka) is a 1958 Czechoslovak short film directed by František Vláčil. It is Vláčil's last film in Military studio. star Antonín Zíb.

== Cast ==
- Antonín Zíb

== Reception ==
=== Accolades ===
Date of ceremony	Event	Award	Recipient(s)	Result	Ref(s)
1958	Venice International Documentary and Short Film Festival	Special Diploma in category of Experimental and Avantgarde Films	Frantisek Vlácil	Won	
