= Jako kníže Rohan =

Jako kníže Rohan is a Czech drama film. It was released in 1983.

== Cast ==
- Vladimír Menšík as Špáta
- Ludmila Roubíková as Špátová
- Jana Gýrová as Baruška
- Věra Galatíková as Pacačka
- Ladislav Pešek as Žežulík
- Libuše Havelková as Žežulíková
- Josef Bláha as Krančil
- Simona Stašová as Pepi Krančilová
- Roman Hemala as úřední poslíček
- Václav Kotva as Klabík
- Jan Pohan as Poklasný
- Viktor Maurer as Jiřička
- Mirko Musil as Kubišta
- Jan Faltýnek as Břízek
- Robert Vrchota as Hostinský
- Karel Houska as Doktor
