= Zbigniew Suszyński =

Polish actor

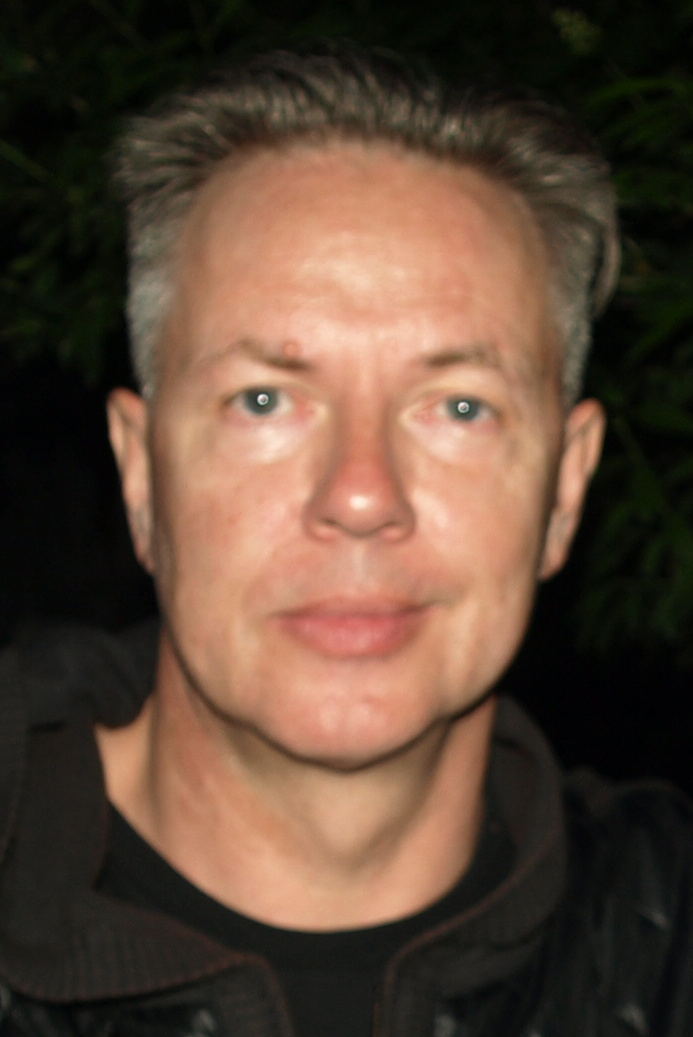
- Born: July 26, 1961 (age 63); Rypin, Poland
- Occupation: Actor
- Years active: 1981–present
- Children: 1

Zbigniew Suszyński (born 26 July 1961, in Rypin) is a Polish film, television and theater actor. He has also provided voice-overs for commercials and television programs. He has been in dubbing roles in many animated films and TV shows, such as in The Brave Little Toaster as Radio, in SpongeBob SquarePants as Squidward Tentacles and in T.U.F.F. Puppy as Verminous Snaptrap. He has played in many films like Shades of Fern (1984), The Young Magician (1986), Korczak (1990) and Szamanka (1996).

== Biography ==
He made his first TV appearance in the television series Jan Serce (1981). Whilst he was still studying acting, on 15 November 1986 he made his theatrical debut, playing the role of Orlando in a performance of Shakespeare's As You Like It at the Julian Tuwim Studyjnego'83 Theatre in Łódź. In 1987 he graduated from the Acting Department of the National Film School in Łódź. Between 1987-1990 he worked at the Stefan Jaracz Theatre in Łódź. Subsequently he performed in theaters in Warsaw: New Theatre - Nowy (1990-1992), Scena Prezentacje (1991-1992, 2001, 2005), the Tadeusz Łomnicki Theatre - Na Woli (1997-1998) and the Warsaw Contemporary Theatre - Teatr Współczesny (since 1992).

His most well known role as the lead actor was playing Krzysztof Buk in the film The Last Bell - Ostatni dzwonek. He has also played on screen as a supporting actor and made appearances as an extra. In the Polsat TV series Samo Życie (2002-2006) he played the role of a journalist and the Head of Sport at the fictional newspaper Samo Życie. In the series, Criminal Bureau - Biuro kryminalne (2005) he was the Head of Homicide. He was also seen in other popular TV series: Extradition - Ekstradycja (1995), 13 posterunek (2000), M jak miłość (2000), Fala zbrodni (2003), Kasia i Tomek (2003), Wild - Dziki (2004) Far from the stretcher - Daleko od noszy (2004) Pensjonat pod Różą (2004), Glina (2004), Pierwsza miłość (2005), Magda M. (2005-2006) and on Na dobre i na złe (2006).

He has played several roles on the big screen including in Samowolka (1993), Młode wilki (1995), Młode wilki 1/2 (1997) and E=mc2 (2002). Suszyński has also portrayed several dark characters, such as the ruthless and vile husband of Ewa, lawyer Bogdan Werner in Adam and Eve - Adam i Ewa (2000).

He also voiced the main character in the game The Feeble Files.

He is married to a teacher. They have a daughter, who is a graduate of the Aleksander Zelwerowicz National Academy of Dramatic Art in Warsaw.

== Bibliography ==
- Zbigniew Suszyński on filmweb.pl (pol.)
- Zbigniew Suszyński on filmpolski.pl (pol.)
- Zbigniew Suszyński on e-teatr.pl (pol.)
- Zbigniew Suszyński at IMDb
