= Don Juan (1969 film) =

- Czech title card
- Directed by: Jan Švankmajer
- Written by: Jan Švankmajer
- Produced by: Josef Soukup
- Starring: František Filipovský
- Cinematography: Svatopluk Malý
- Edited by: Milada Sádková
- Music by: Zdeněk Liška
- Production company: Krátký Film Praha
- Release date: 1969
- Running time: 30 minutes
- Country: Czechoslovakia
- Language: Czech

Don Juan (Czech: Don Šajn) is a 1969 Czechoslovak short film by Jan Švankmajer, based on traditional Czech puppet plays of the Don Juan legend.

== Plot ==
Within an old dilapidated and seemingly automated theater, human-sized marionettes perform a production of the Don Juan legend without the aid of puppeteers or an audience.

In the play, Don Juan's fiancée Maria is secretly seeing his brother Don Phillipe. Unbeknownst to the two lovers, Don Juan is watching them from one of the balconies. Horrified by the thought of Maria leaving him for Philippe, he calls upon his Jester servant for help. So that he can pay for a wedding, Juan sends the Fool into town to ask for money from the Mayor (Juan and Phillipe's father), under the false pretense that Juan needs the money to pay off medical bills. When Juan's father learns about his son's true intentions, he gives the Jester two coins so he and Juan can buy some rope to hang themselves with. Outraged by this, Don Juan murders his own father backstage and heads over to the garden where Maria and Philippe were planning to meet.

Maria arrives shortly after, but is shocked to discover Don Juan there instead of her true love — Philippe. Demanding that she return his feelings or face the consequences, he chases after Maria but is stopped by her father, Don Vespis, who now realizes Juan is unfit to marry his daughter and threatens to have him arrested. Don Juan dispatches of Maria's father by cutting his face off, and as he lay dying, he swears his ghost will haunt Don Juan to exact his revenge.

Philippe soon discovers Maria mourning her dead father, and swears to avenge them both. He eventually finds Don Juan and the two engage in a duel which ends with Philippe's gory demise. The Jester then arrives to tell Juan that there is a spectral man who wants to speak with him in the cemetery. The man turns out to be the spirit of Maria's dead father, who warns Don Juan that his soul will be dragged to Hell at midnight.

As in the traditional Czech puppet plays, Juan urges children not to commit evil deeds like him.

Juan's physical body keels over dead into an open grave, while his spirit is lowered into a trapdoor. Instead of being dragged into Hell as the legend suggests, the lifeless puppet merely falls into a compartment beneath the stage. Upon discovering an inanimate Don Juan, The Jester asks how he is going to get paid with his master dead.
