= The White Dove (1960 film) =

- Poster of the film
- Directed by: Frantisek Vlácil
- Written by: František Vláčil
- Starring: Karel Smyczek, Kateřina Imanovová
- Cinematography: Jan Čuřík
- Edited by: Miroslav Hájek
- Music by: Zdeněk Liška
- Production company: Barrandov Studios
- Distributed by: Ústřední půjčovna filmů
- Release date: 4 November 1960
- Running time: 76 minutes
- Country: Czechoslovakia
- Languages: Czech; French; German

The White Dove (Czech: Holubice) is a 1960 Czechoslovak film directed by František Vláčil. It is Vláčil's first full-length film.

== Plot ==
The film is based on the short story "Susanne" by Otakar Kirchner: a dove belongs to a German girl, Susanne. The dove gets lost on its way from France to the Baltic Sea and ends up in Prague. The dove is shot by a crippled boy, Michal. It is found by a sculptor, Martin, who brings it to Michal. Michal helps the dove to recover and he befriends Martin. Martin finds from where the dove comes and sends there a picture of the bird. Susanne, is sad from the dove's absence but realises that the dove will return. Michal recovers together with the dove but does not want to give her up. Martin eventually convinces Michal to release the dove.

== Cast ==
- Kateřina Irmanovová as Susanne Kleist
- Karel Smyczek as Michal
- Anna Pitašová as Michal's mother
- Václav Irmanov as Martin
- Gustav Püttjer as an old man

== Reception ==
=== Accolades ===
Date of ceremony	Event	Award	Recipient(s)	Result	Ref(s)
1960	Venice International Film Festival	Medal of the Biennial - Out of Competition	František Vláčil, Jan Čuřík	Won	
1961	Versailles Film Festival	Silver Sun		Won	
1961	International Meeting of Films for Youth Cannes	Grand Prix in category of extraordinary valuable films		Won	
1961	International Film Meeting Prades	Grand Prix in category of Feature Films		Won	
1962	Cartagena Film Festival	India Catalina Award		Won	
1962	International Documentary and Experimental Film Festival Montevideo	Special Appreciation Award		Won	
