= Something Different (1963 film) =

1963 film by Vera Chytilová

- O něčem jiném
- Directed by: Věra Chytilová
- Written by: Věra Chytilová
- Produced by: Ladislav Fikar; Bohumil Šmída
- Starring: Eva Bosáková; Věra Uzelacová; Josef Langmiler; Jiří Kodet; Milivoj Uzelac; Jaroslava Matlochová; Luboš Ogoun; Vladimír Bosák; Dagmar Cejnková
- Cinematography: Jan Čuřík
- Edited by: Miroslav Hájek
- Music by: Jiří Šlitr
- Release date: 1963
- Running time: 81 minutes
- Country: Czechoslovak Socialist Republic
- Language: Czech

Something Different (Czech: O něčem jiném, lit. 'About something different') is a 1963 Czechoslovak film directed by Věra Chytilová. The film intersperses two separate narratives: one following Věra, a fictional housewife living in Czechoslovakia, and another following Eva, an Olympic gymnast played by real-life Olympic gold medalist Eva Bosáková.

Chytilová's first feature-length film, it is regarded as one of the breakout films of the Czech New Wave, as well as an early example of women's cinema in the Eastern Bloc. While not as well known as some of Chytilová's other films such as Daisies and Fruit of Paradise, it won the main prize at the 1963 Mannheim Film Festival, and has been praised by both contemporary critics and 21st century retrospectives, in addition to receiving a fair amount of attention in academic film literature.

== Background ==
Released in 1963, Something Different was one of the first films of the Czech New Wave, and Chytilová's first feature-length film. Chytilová was one of the only women filmmakers who participated in the Czech New Wave, and Something Different, like many other of the entries in her filmography, focuses on women's lives and challenges in Czechoslovakia.

== Style and synopsis ==
Something Different merges documentary-style footage of Eva, a Czechoslovak gymnast played by real-life Olympic gold-medalist Eva Bosáková, as she endures incessant training in preparation for a competition. These scenes are juxtaposed against a narrative following the fictional housewife Věra, who is discontented and overwhelmed by housework as she struggles to take care of her misbehaving son Mydla and her inattentive husband Josef, eventually resorting to a similarly unsatisfying affair with Jirka. There is no narrative link between the two women's stories apart from the opening scene in which the documentary images of Eva appear on Vera's television set.

After many scenes of Eva enduring grueling and humiliating training sessions, the film includes scenes of her actually performing her routine at a competition, and a final shot of her working as a gymnastics instructor for a younger woman. Meanwhile, Věra's marriage almost collapses as her husband reveals that he is also having an affair, and tells her that they should divorce, although a final scene shows her together with family.

== Analysis ==
Something Different has been described as a cinematic breakthrough alongside Black Peter and The Cry, discarding the morality tales of earlier socialist cinema and replacing them with frank depictions of everyday life, in addition to breaking with other traditional conventions of film form.

In an overview of Chytilová's early career, Jiří Ceslar, professor of film at the Faculty of Arts, Charles University in Prague, describes the film as a meditation on the meaning of life, expressed through Eva and Věra's lines which are on one hand trivial everyday phrases and on the other hand appear to have metaphorical importance as commentary on life's struggles; these statements also carry a theme set in the film's title, as they are always "about something different". While the film invites the viewer to draw connections between Vera and Eva's lives through their narrative juxtaposition, scholars have also noted the stark difference in the nature of Eva and Věra's problems: where Eva is constrained by an extremely rigid regime of exercise, Vera is vexed by a lack of direction.

Something Different is also contrasted against Chytilová's following two films, 1965's Pearls of the Deep and 1966's Daisies. In particular, the three films display a progression in Chytilová's use of structure, with Pearls of the Deep as a stepping stone between the tightly structured Something Different and the anarchic Daisies. Similarly, Something Different is an example of Chytilová's use of the style of cinema verite in her early career, contrasted against more allegorical works such as Daisies and Fruit of Paradise.

== Cast ==
- Eva Bosáková as gymnast Eva
- Věra Uzelacová as Věra
- Josef Langmiler as Josef, Věra's husband
- Jiří Kodet as Jirka, Věra's lover
- Milivoj Uzelac Jr. as Mylda, Věra's and Josef's son (as Milivoj Uzelac)
- Jaroslava Matlochová as Eva's ballet coach
- Luboš Ogoun as Eva's ballet coach
- Vladimír Bosák as dr. Bosák, Eva's husband (as Dr. Vladimir Bosák)
- Dagmar Cejnková as Dada, Věra's friend (as Dada Cejnková)
- Jirí Cejnek as Dada's husband
- Oldřich Červinka as journalist

== Reception ==
A contemporary review in Le Monde praised Chytilová's humor and virtuoso technique. The film won the main prize at the Mannheim Film Festival in 1963.

The film has also received renewed attention from Anglophone critics in the 21st century. A review by The Arts Desk of a DVD release of the film in 2016 praised the film's ability to avoid pretentiousness, thanks to the work of the Chytilová, Čurík, Šlitr, and Hájek. A review in The New Yorker called it "radically and thrillingly different from more or less any film that was being made at the time", praising its camerawork and subject matter. A review in Hyperallergic described the film as "subtle and poignant".
