= Zbyněk Brynych =

Czech film director

- Born: 13 June 1927; Karlovy Vary, Czechoslovakia
- Died: 24 August 1995 (aged 68); Prague, Czech Republic
- Occupations: Film director Screenwriter
- Years active: 1951-1985

Zbyněk Brynych (13 June 1927 – 24 August 1995) was a Czech film director and screenwriter. He directed 30 films between 1951 and 1985.

== Selected filmography ==
Czechoslovakia

- Suburban Romance (1958)
- Five in a Million (1959)
- Skid (1960)
- Every Penny Counts (1961)
- Don't Take Shelter When It Rains! (1962)
- Transport from Paradise (1962)
- Constellation of the Virgo (1965)
- The Fifth Horseman Is Fear (1965)
- Transit Carlsbad (1966)
- I, Justice (1968)

Germany

- Der Kommissar (1969–1970, TV series, 4 episodes)
- Amerika, or The Man Who Disappeared (1969, TV film) — (based on Amerika by Franz Kafka)
- Seventeen and Anxious (1970)
- Angels with Burnt Wings (1970)
- The Females (1970)
- The Night in Lisbon (1971, TV film) — (based on The Night in Lisbon by Erich Maria Remarque)
- Derrick (1975–1994, TV series, 37 episodes)
- The Old Fox (1978–1994, TV series, 45 episodes)
