= Zdeněk Liška =

Czech composer (1922–1983)

Zdeněk Liška (16 March 1922 – 13 August 1983) was a Czech composer who produced a large number of film scores across a prolific career that started in the 1950s. He was revelatory in his contribution to the development of electronic music. His music in this field is noticeable and dramatic, based on a unique musical feeling achieved through using quite unusual instrumental combinations and various electronic and electroacoustic techniques.

== Biography ==
Zdeněk Liška was born on 16 March 1922 in Smečno near Kladno in central Bohemia. His father and grandfather were amateur municipal musicians. As a child he learned to play the accordion and the violin; while in high school, he composed his first song.

He studied composition and conducting at Prague Conservatory under Rudolf Karel, Otakar Šín, Metod Doležil, and Karel Janeček. He graduated from the Conservatory in 1944. After a brief stint as a conductor of an amateur orchestra in Slaný and as a teacher at a Humpolec music school, he joined the Zlín Film Studios in 1945.

== Works ==
Liška worked notably with animator Jan Švankmajer, scoring several of his earlier short films: Punch and Judy (1966), Et Cetera (1966), Historia Naturae (Suita) (1967), The Flat (1968), Don Juan (1969), The Ossuary (1970), Jabberwocky (1971), and Leonardo's Diary (1972), and later The Castle of Otranto (1979). Liška's music for Švankmajer's Historia Naturae (Suita), The Flat, and The Ossuary was also featured in the 1984 short film by American animators the Brothers Quay entitled The Cabinet of Jan Švankmajer.

He also created a great number of iconic scores for important live-action films of the Czech New Wave including The Shop on Main Street, Marketa Lazarová, The Valley of the Bees, Fruit of Paradise, The Cremator and Ikarie XB-1.

Liska was the most sought after film composer in Czechoslovakia in the 1950s and 1960s. He scored eight films a year plus numerous shorts, during the 1960s.

In addition to his feature-film work, Liška wrote music for the travel documentary films of Hanzelka and Zikmund, for Laterna Magika, for twelve of Karel Zeman's Mr. Prokouk films, and for various popular science short films. The main theme he wrote for the heavily propagandist television series Thirty Cases of Major Zeman is still widely remembered in the Czech Republic, where it is often played by rock bands.

In the mid-twentieth century, he was among the most well-known Czech film composers and the foremost Czech composer of fantasy film scores. He was noted for his skill with musical characterizations and humor in music, as well as his creative use of electronic music techniques. He lived in the era of film symphonies but he loved experimenting too with popular rock music and electronic instruments. His score for Death Is Called Engelchen won a prize in a competition for the best Czechoslovak feature-length film score of 1963.

== Selected filmography ==
Year	Film
1950	Pára nad hrncem
1952	Poklad Ptačího ostrova
1953	Z Argentiny do Mexika
1953	Afrika I, II
1956	Míček Flíček
1957	Tam na konečné
1957	Nové světy - selection of archive music
1958	Vynález zkázy
1958	Muž mnoha tváří
1959	Probuzení
1960	Higher Principle
1960	The White Dove
1960	Laterna magika II.
1961	The Fabulous Baron Munchausen
1961	The Devil's Trap
1961	Labyrint srdce
1961	Spadla s měsíce
1962	Půlnoční mše
1963	Cesta hlubokým lesem
1963	Tři zlaté vlasy děda Vševěda
1963	Ikarie XB-1
1963	Death Is Called Engelchen
1964	Čintamani a podvodník
1964	Obžalovaný
1964	Jak dělat podobiznu ptáka
1965	The Shop on Main Street
1965	Sběrné surovosti
1966	Poklad byzantského kupce
1966	Lidé z maringotek
1966	Anděl blažené smrti
1967	Údolí včel
1967	Zmluva s diablom
1967	Útěk
1967	Marketa Lazarová
1968	The Cremator
1968	Maratón
1968	Spravedlnost pro Selvina (TV)
1968	The Sinful People of Prague (TV series)
1969	Adelheid
1969	Birds, Orphans and Fools
1969	Touha zvaná Anada
1969	Ovoce stromů rajských jíme
1970	Partie krásného dragouna
1970	Medená veža
1971	Smrt černého krále
1971	Pěnička a Paraplíčko
1971	Orlie pierko
1972	Vlak do stanice Nebe
1972	The Stolen Battle
1973	The Legend of the Silver Fir
1973	Hriech Kataríny Padychovej
1974	Kto odchádza v daždi
1974	Poslední ples na rožnovské plovárně
1974	Jáchyme, hoď ho do stroje!
1975	Tak láska začíná
1975	Nevěsta s nejkrásnějšíma očima
1976	Smoke on the Potato Fields
1976	Smrt mouchy
1976	Odysseus a hvězdy
1977	Volání rodu
1977	Na Veliké řece
1977	Osada Havranů
1977	Shadows of a Hot Summer
1977	Příběh lásky a cti
1977	Hodina pravdy
1978	Silnější než strach
1978	Čekání na déšť
1978	Setkání v červenci
1979	A poběžím až na kraj světa
1979	Smrť šitá na mieru
1980	Signum laudis
1981	Kam zmizel kurýr
