= Dolní Kalná =

- Municipality
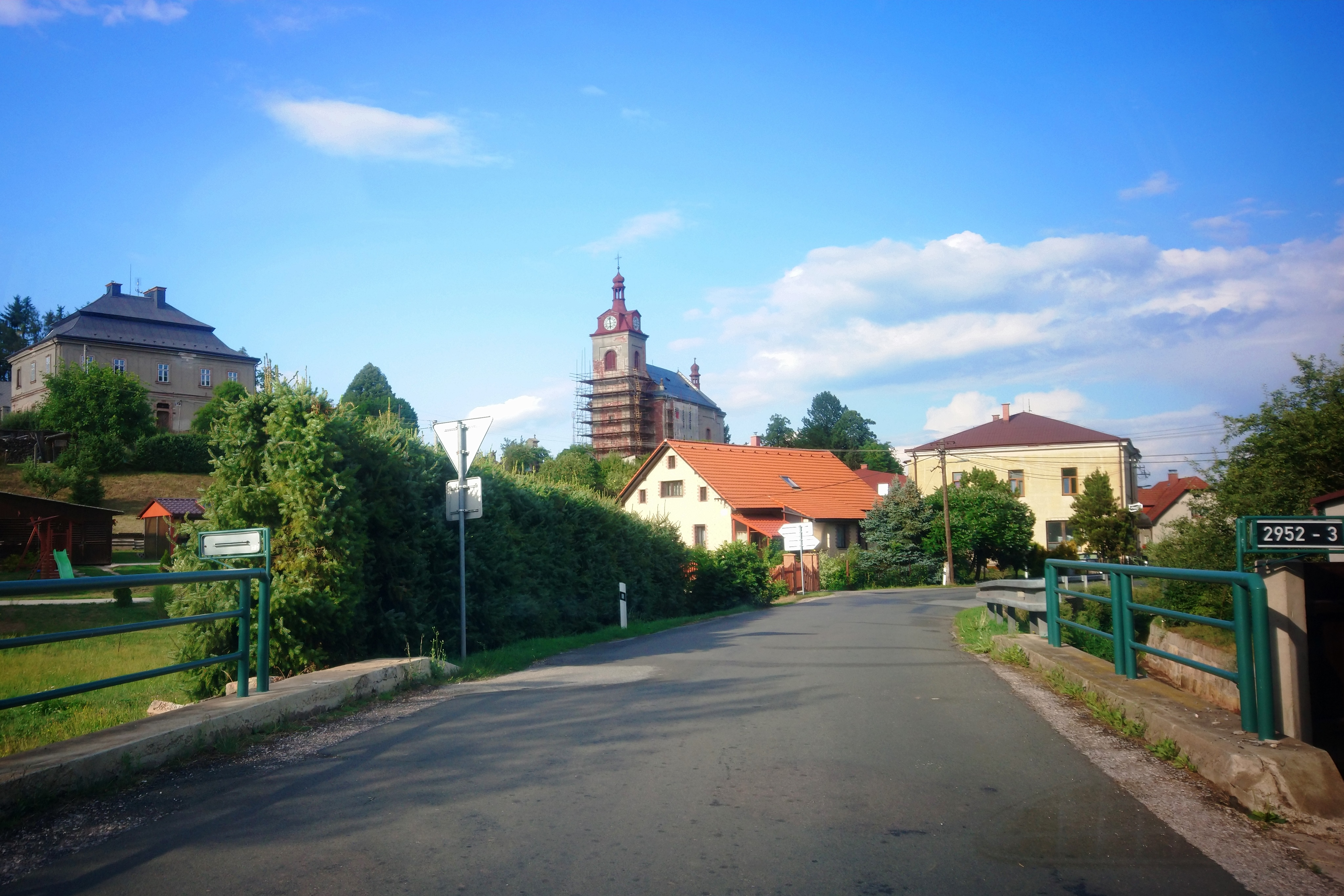
- View towards the Church of the Visitation of the Virgin Mary and Saint Wenceslaus

- Flag Coat of arms

- Location in the Czech Republic
- Coordinates: 50°32′20″N 15°38′21″E
- Country: Czech Republic
- Region: Hradec Králové
- District: Trutnov
- First mentioned: 1369

Area
  - Total: 9.70 km^{2} (3.75 sq mi)
- Elevation: 377 m (1,237 ft)

Population (2026-01-01)
  - Total: 699
  - Density: 72.1/km^{2} (187/sq mi)
- Time zone: UTC+1 (CET)
  - Summer (DST): UTC+2 (CEST)
- Postal code: 543 74
- Website: www.dolnikalna.cz

Dolní Kalná is a municipality and village in Trutnov District in the Hradec Králové Region of the Czech Republic. It has about 700 inhabitants.

== Administrative division ==
Dolní Kalná consists of two municipal parts (in brackets population according to the 2021 census):

- Dolní Kalná (538)
- Slemeno (128)

== Demographics ==
Historical population
Year	Pop.	±%
1869	1,111	—
1880	1,152	+3.7%
1890	1,202	+4.3%
1900	1,321	+9.9%
1910	1,307	−1.1%
1921	1,137	−13.0%
1930	1,161	+2.1%
1950	811	−30.1%
1961	818	+0.9%
1970	793	−3.1%
1980	684	−13.7%
1991	589	−13.9%
2001	624	+5.9%
2011	678	+8.7%
2021	666	−1.8%
Source: Censuses
