= The Valley of the Bees =

- Directed by: František Vláčil
- Written by: Vladimír Körner; František Vláčil
- Produced by: Věra Kadlecová
- Starring: Petr Čepek; Jan Kačer
- Cinematography: František Uldrich
- Edited by: Miroslav Hájek
- Music by: Zdeněk Liška
- Production company: Barrandov Studios
- Distributed by: Ústřední půjčovna filmů
- Release date: 17 May 1968
- Running time: 97 Minutes
- Country: Czechoslovakia
- Language: Czech
- Budget: 4 379 000 Kčs

The Valley of the Bees (Czech: Údolí včel) is a 1968 Czechoslovak historical drama film directed by František Vláčil. The film follows a young man Ondřej who's sent to join the Teutonic order by his father. When he flees the order and returns home, his friend Armin is determined to bring him back.

== Plot ==
The film is set in the 13th century. The lord of Vlkov marries much younger Lenora. His son Ondřej gives live bats to Lenora as a wedding gift, which enrages his father who almost kills him. He prays for the boy to survive. He promises to God that he will give Ondřej to the Teutonic Order if he survives. Ondřej is healed and sent to the Baltic Sea, where he joins the Teutonic Order. He befriends Armin who becomes his mentor and protector. Armin participated in the Crusades to the Holy Land and is a fanatic who is devoted to God.

Knight Rotgier tries to leave the order and escapes. Ondřej, Armin and other members chase him. He is found by Ondřej and tries to convince Ondřej to leave the order. Ondřej hesitates to arrest him but declines. Rotgier injures him and steals his horse. Rotgier is eventually captured and executed for attacking Ondřej. Ondřej is punished by penitence for his weakness. Ondřej decides to run away. Armin decides to track him down.

Armin travels to Bohemia where he hears about Ondřej from charcoal burners who wanted to steal his sword. Armin joins them and when they surprise Ondřej, he attacks the one who wanted to steal his sword which makes the other charcoal burners attack him. But Armin draws his sword and kills or scares them away saving Ondřej's life. Ondřej's sword has been broken in the fight and Armin forces him to go with him. Later, near a brook when Armin bends over to drink, Ondřej hits him with a stone which causes Armin to fall unconscious and Ondřej escapes.

Ondřej returns home only to find out his father is dead. He takes care of his father's business, but feels remorse about what he did to Armin. Ondřej falls in love with Lenora and convinces a local priest to marry them. When they are getting married, Armin shows up. Ondřej invites him to the wedding but tension between them runs out. Ondřej convinces Armin to spend the night in Vlkov. During the night, Armin gets to Lenora's chambers and murders her. He gets caught and Ondřej decides to execute him in a similar manner as Rotgier was killed. Armin begs Ondřej to return to the order before his death. The film concludes with Ondřej's return to Teutonic Order.

== Cast ==
- Petr Čepek as Ondřej
- Jan Kačer as Armin von Heide
- Věra Galatíková as Lenora
- Zdeněk Kryzánek as Lord of Vlkov
- Miroslav Macháček as Brown Friar
- Josef Somr as Rotgier
- Václav Kotva as Farmer

== Production ==
The film was produced after Vláčil's previous film Marketa Lazarová. Marketa was very expensive and it was decided to make another film set in Middle Ages so the sets and costumes could be re-used. However by the time production started the sets from Marketa Lazarová were already destroyed. The screenplay was written by Vláčil and Vladimír Körner. Körner was doing research for his novel Písečná kosa about Prussian uprisings when he was contacted by Vláčil. They quickly wrote the screenplay and the film immediately went into production. Körner released Valley of the Bees as a novel in 1975.

The film was eventually shot at Kuklov monastery ruins near Brloh. The Teutonic order scenes were shot at Czech castles Karlštejn and Rabí and Polish castles Malborg and Lidzbark Warmiński. Theodor Pištěk designed the costumes for the film. Vláčil was inspired by historical movies of Ingmar Bergman and Robert Bresson.

Jan Kačer was originally supposed to play both Armin and Ondřej. It proved to be technically impossible so Kačer suggested Petr Čepek for the role of Ondřej. The director demanded that ascetic knight Armin needs to be slim, so Kačer was forced to lose 11 kilograms for the role. The film was shot from July to October 1967. Post-production ended in December 1967. The final budget was 4 379 000 Kčs.

== Release ==
=== Theatrical release ===
The film had a premiere on 17 May 1968 at Kino U Hradeb in Prague. During its theatrical run it only managed to attract 350,000 viewers. The film was re-released in theatres in 1980.

=== Home video ===
The film was released on DVD in 2007 by Bonton in the Czech Republic. A Second Run DVD with English subtitles was released in 2010.

== Reception ==
The film received mixed reviews from critics. Many felt that it didn't reach the qualities of Marketa Lazarová, which premiered just 4 months earlier. Gustav Francl criticized the casting Jan Kačer, who he felt didn't fit in the role of Armin. The film had better reviews in foreign press and today it is considered one of Vláčil's best works.

== See also ==
- List of historical drama films
- Teutonic Knights in popular culture
