= Vladimír Körner =

Czech novelist and screenwriter (born 1939)

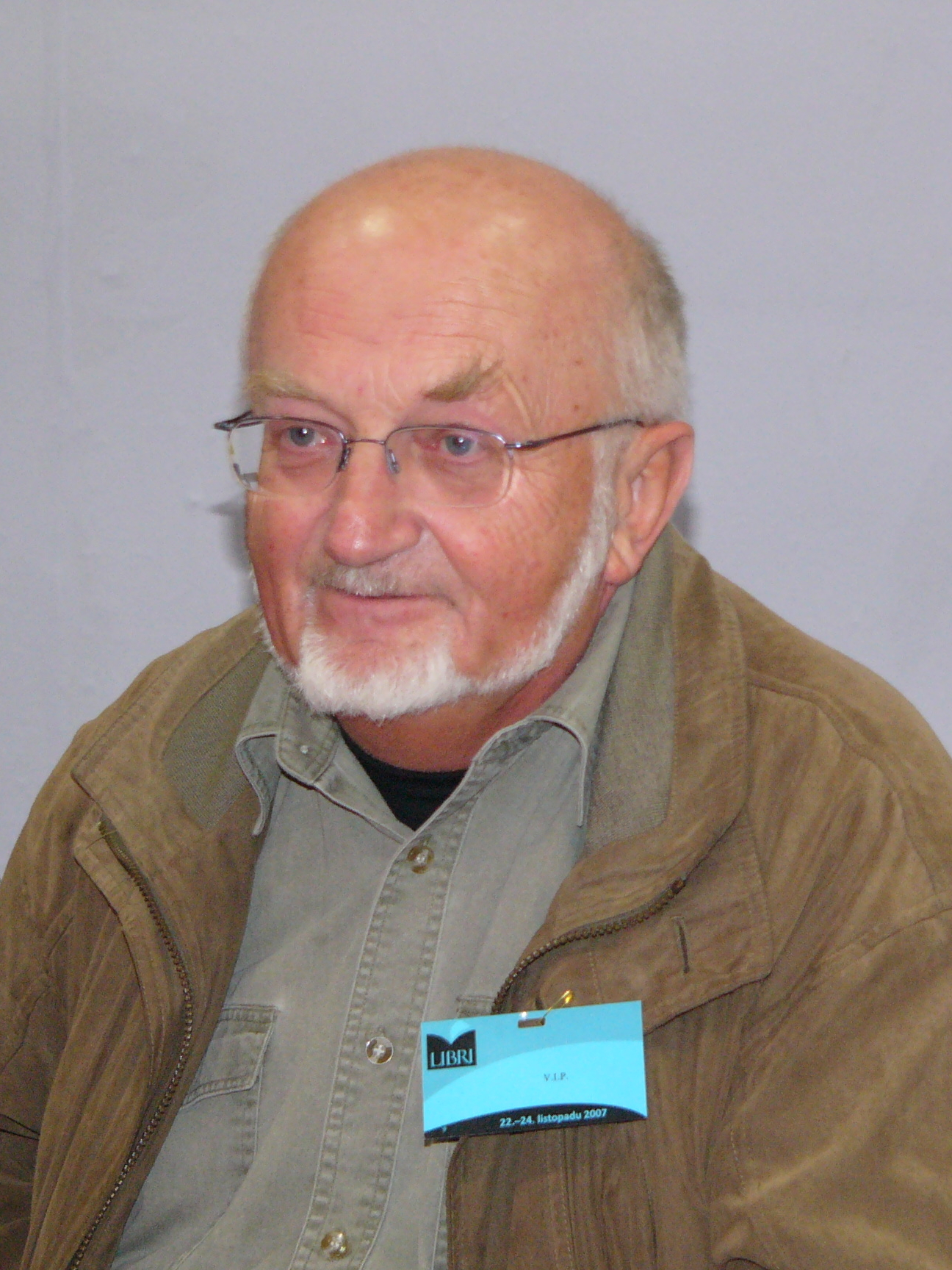
Vladimír Körner (2007)

Vladimír Körner (born 12 October 1939 in Prostějov) is a Czech novelist and screenwriter. His novels were also adapted into screenplays for about 20 films.

== Partial filmography ==
- The Valley of the Bees (1968)
- Adelheid (film) (1969)
- Angel of Mercy (1993)
- Spring of Life (2000)

== Selected novels ==
- Zánik samoty Berhof (1973)
