= Mág (film) =

- Czech poster
- Directed by: František Vláčil
- Written by: Václav Nývlt
- Starring: Jiří Schwarz
- Cinematography: Jiří Macák, Jan Hanzal
- Edited by: Miroslav Hájek
- Music by: Jiří F. Svoboda
- Production company: Barrandov Studios
- Distributed by: Ústřední půjčovna filmů
- Release date: March 1988
- Running time: 87 minutes
- Country: Czechoslovakia
- Language: Czech

Mág (Magician) is a 1988 Czech film directed by František Vláčil. The film is about Czech poet Karel Hynek Mácha. It is Vláčil's last film. The film received mixed reviews and critics called it a reflection of Vláčil's previous work.

== Plot ==
Mácha goes to Litoměřice where he accepted position as a Notary. He plans to marry Lori who is getting prepared for the wedding. Mácha's brother Michal comes instead of him and announces that Mácha is dead. The film then switches to when Mácha and Lori met. Mácha and Lori met in Kajetán's theatre. The film shows Mácha's and Lori's relationship. It also shows Mácha's meeting with ill girl Márinka who is a fan of his poems. Mácha also hears that someone called Hynek killed his father in jealousy. It inspires Mácha to make his most famous poem, Máj. When Máj is released it is received negatively and Mácha needs to provide Lori who is pregnant and accepts position as a Notary in Litoměřice. He spends his free time at Rádobyce. One day there is a fire and Mácha helps but his organism succumbs illness and he dies.

== Cast ==
- Jiří Schwarz as Karel Hynek Mácha
- Veronika Žilková as Lori Šomková
- Věra Tichánková as Lori's mother
- Blažena Holišová as Mácha's mother
- Jan Hrušínský as Mácha's brother Michal
- Marta Vančurová as Márinka
- Zdeněk Řehoř as Márinka's father
- Václav Knop as Josef Kajetán Tyl
- Jana Švandová as Leni Forchheimová
- Tomáš Juřička as Jan Kaška
- Alexej Okuněv as Karel Sabina
- Jan Kraus as Trojan
