= Josef Bělohradský =

Czech basketball player

Personal information
- Nationality: Czech
- Born: 9 December 1926
- Died: 10 February 2006 (aged 79); Prague, Czech Republic

Sport
- Sport: Basketball

Josef Bělohradský (9 December 1926 – 10 February 2006) was a Czech basketball player. He competed in the men's tournament at the 1948 Summer Olympics.
