= Emma Černá =

Czech actress

Personal details
- Born: 23 March 1937 Mladá Boleslav, Czechoslovakia
- Died: 2 July 2018 (aged 81) Prague
- Education: Academy of Performing Arts in Prague

Emma Černá (23 March 1937 – 2 July 2018) was a Czech stage, film and television actress.

Upon her graduation from the Academy of Performing Arts, Černá worked at the Theatre on the Balustrade and the Palmovka Theatre. She was also a guest at the Comedy Theatre in Prague and the Prague National Theatre. She has made appearances in almost fifty film or television roles.
