= Barrandov Studios =

Film studios in Prague, Czech Republic

Coordinates: 50°01.841′N 14°23.493′E

- Type: Subsidiary of Moravia Steel
- Industry: Motion pictures
- Founded: 1931; 95 years ago
- Headquarters: Prague, Czech Republic
- Revenue: 548,981,000 Czech koruna (2019)
- Operating income: 112,232,000 Czech koruna (2019)
- Net income: 88,753,000 Czech koruna (2019)
- Total assets: 1,129,199,000 Czech koruna (2019)
- Number of employees: 147 (2019)
- Website: barrandov.cz

Barrandov Studios is a set of film studios in Prague, Czech Republic. It is the largest film studio in the country and one of the largest in Europe. Barrandov has made several major Hollywood productions, including Mission Impossible, The Bourne Identity, Casino Royale, G.I. Joe: The Rise of Cobra, The Chronicles of Narnia: The Lion, the Witch and the Wardrobe, The Zookeeper's Wife, Nosferatu, among others.

== Founding ==
Czech film history is closely connected with that of Prague's entrepreneurial Havel family, and especially with the activities of the brothers Miloš Havel (1899–1968) and Václav Maria Havel (1897–1979), the latter being the father of the former Czech president of the same name.

In 1921, Miloš Havel created the A-B Joint Stock Company by merging his own American Film distribution company with the Biografia film distributors. Initially, A-B studios were located in the garden of a Vinohrady brewery. However, with the emerging sound film, new modern stages equipped for sound recording had to be built. In early 1930s, Havel's brother, Václav, planned to build a luxurious residential complex on a hill on what were then the outskirts of Prague. Miloš Havel had suggested that he include a modern film studio in the development. The area would be called Barrandov after Joachim Barrande, the French geologist who had worked at the fossil-rich site in the 19th century. Since then, Barrandov Rock displays a plaque with Barrande's name.

Construction of the studio, based on designs by Max Urban, began on 28 November 1931 and was completed in 1933. One year later, Barrandov's first Czech film, Murder on Ostrovni Street, was shot there. The volume of films made at the studio increased rapidly. Barrandov had three hundred permanent employees, was making up to eighty films a year, and had begun to attract foreign producers. It was the best-equipped studio in Central Europe, and in its early years, foreign production companies such as UFA, MGM, and Paramount developed their own distribution systems in Czechoslovakia thanks to Barrandov.

During the occupation of Czechoslovakia by Nazi Germany during World War II, between 1940 and 1945, major additions were made to the studio's facilities. Seeking to make Barrandov an equal to the major film studios in Berlin and Munich, the Nazis drew up plans for three large interconnecting stages. Construction work started in 1941, but the final stage was not completed until early 1945. These three huge stages, with more than 37,000 square feet (3,400 m^{2}) of shooting space, still form the main attraction of the studios to filmmakers throughout the world.

Shortly after the war, Barrandov and its smaller sister, Hostivař Studios, were nationalized and remained under state ownership until the beginning of the 1990s. During this time, Barrandov's new film laboratories were constructed, as was a special effects stage with a back projection tunnel and a water tank equipped for underwater shooting.

== New wave ==
In the 1960s, a new wave of Czech films attracted worldwide attention. Czech film directors working at Barrandov at this time included Miloš Forman, Jiří Menzel, Vojtěch Jasný, Pavel Juráček, Věra Chytilová, Jan Němec, Ivan Passer, František Vláčil, Elmar Klos, and Ján Kadár.

Throughout the 1970s and 1980s, Barrandov continued to produce feature films, particularly comedies and fairy-tales, turning out an average of seventy pictures a year. In the 1980s, some major American productions were made in the studios, including Barbra Streisand's Yentl and Miloš Forman's Amadeus, winner of several Academy Awards.

== Post-revolution ==
Shortly after the Velvet Revolution in 1989, Barrandov was privatized. The studio almost closed down in 2000. However, the decline in local films was balanced out by an increase in foreign productions, particularly feature films made by US producers. Czech Television stations and producers of commercials also made extensive use of the facility.

In December 2006, Barrandov Studios opened a massive new sound stage aimed at attracting bigger productions. According to studio representatives, in terms of size, the new facility is now the largest in Europe, at 4,000 square metres.

== Gallery ==
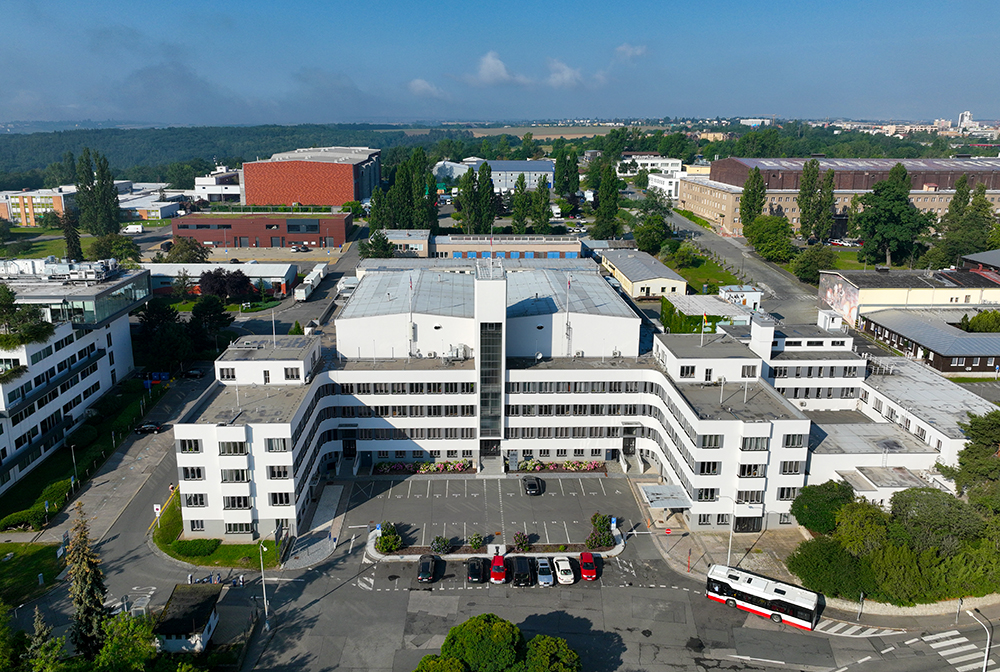
Main building

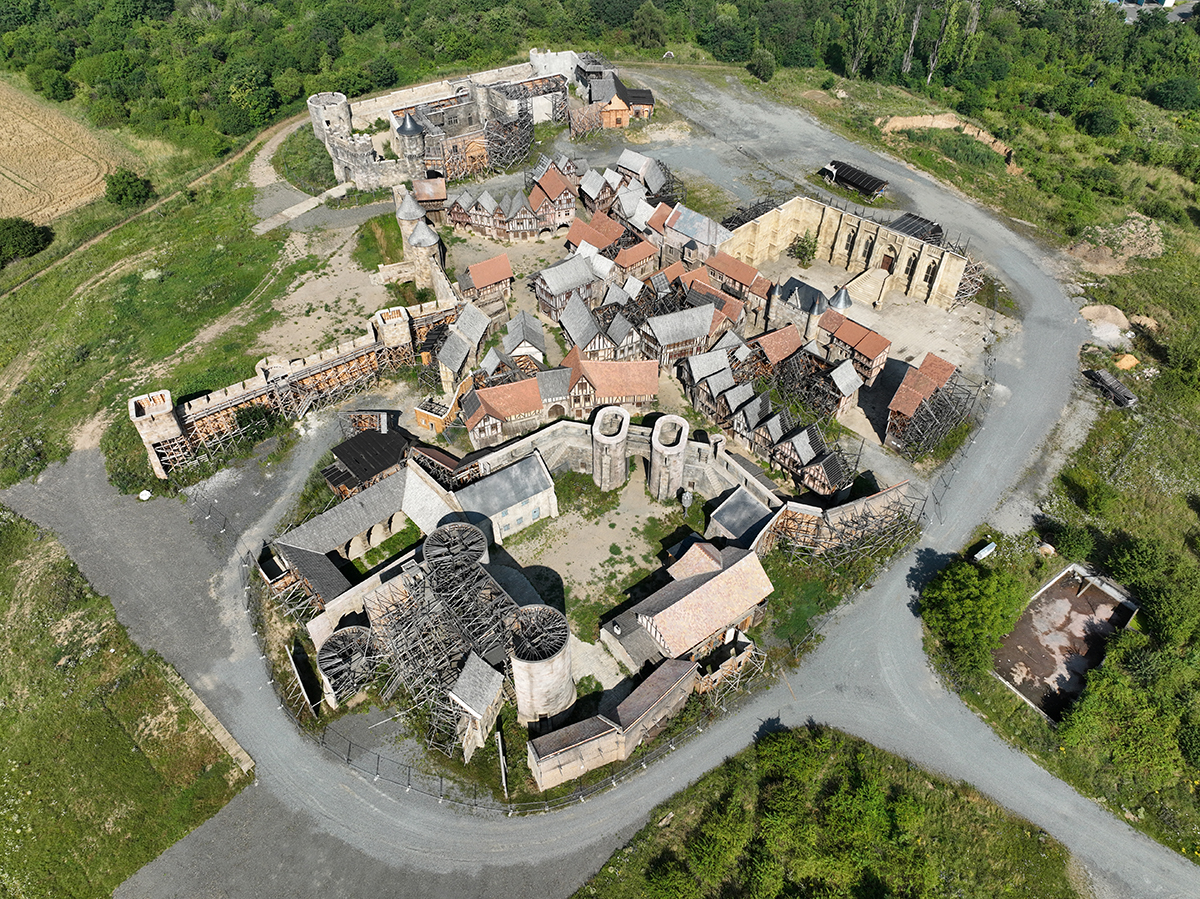
Medieval town permanent set

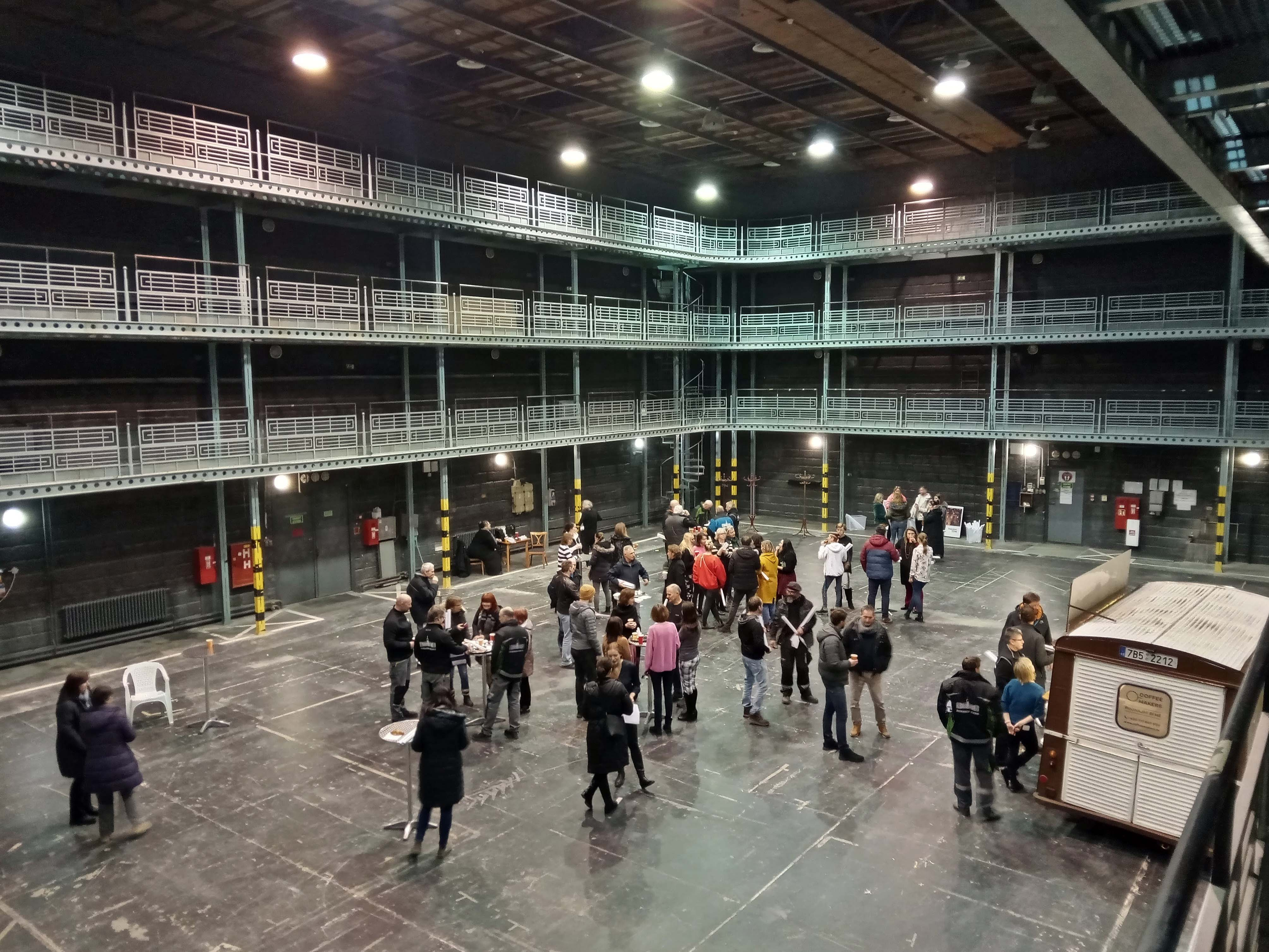
Atelier

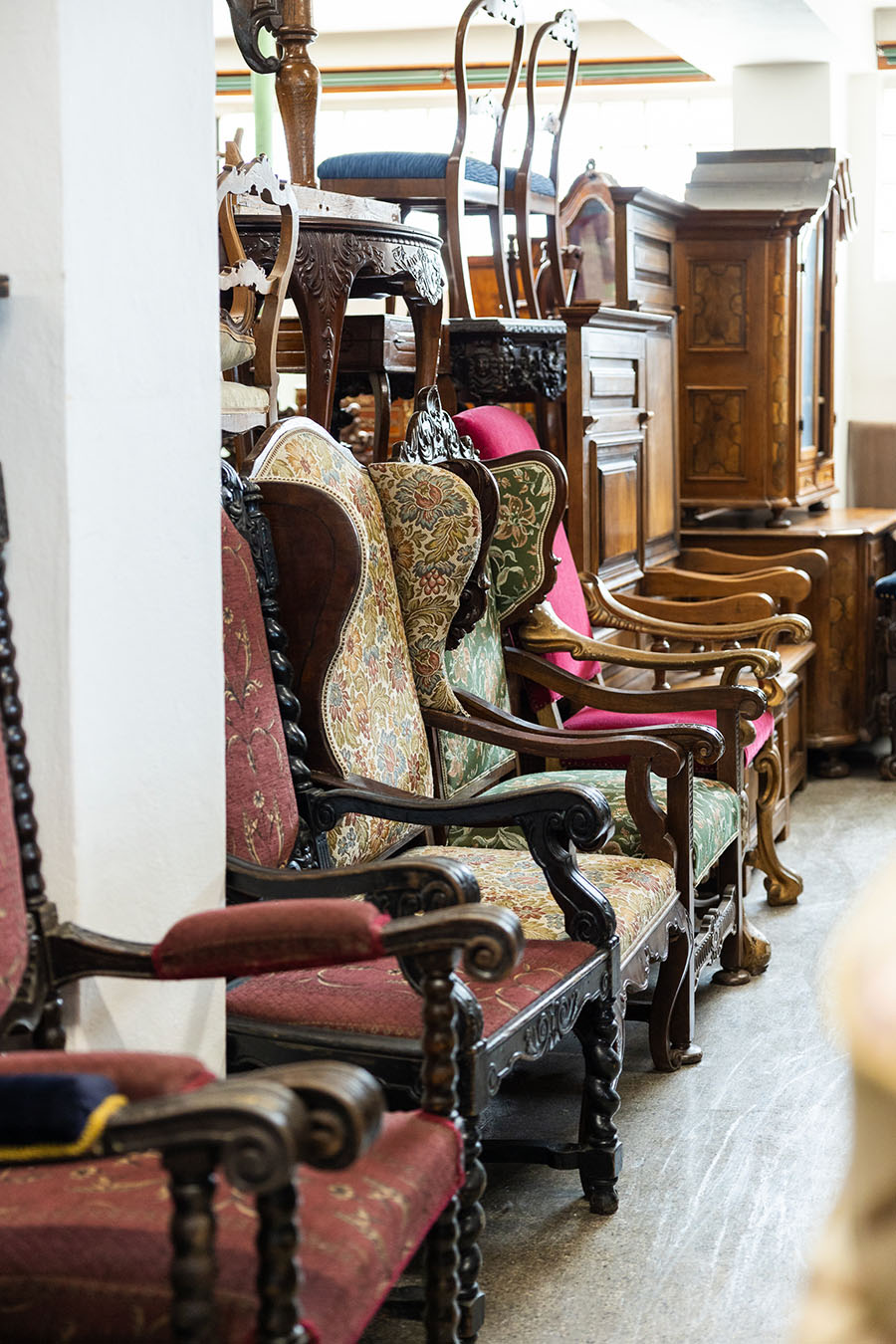
Prop rental

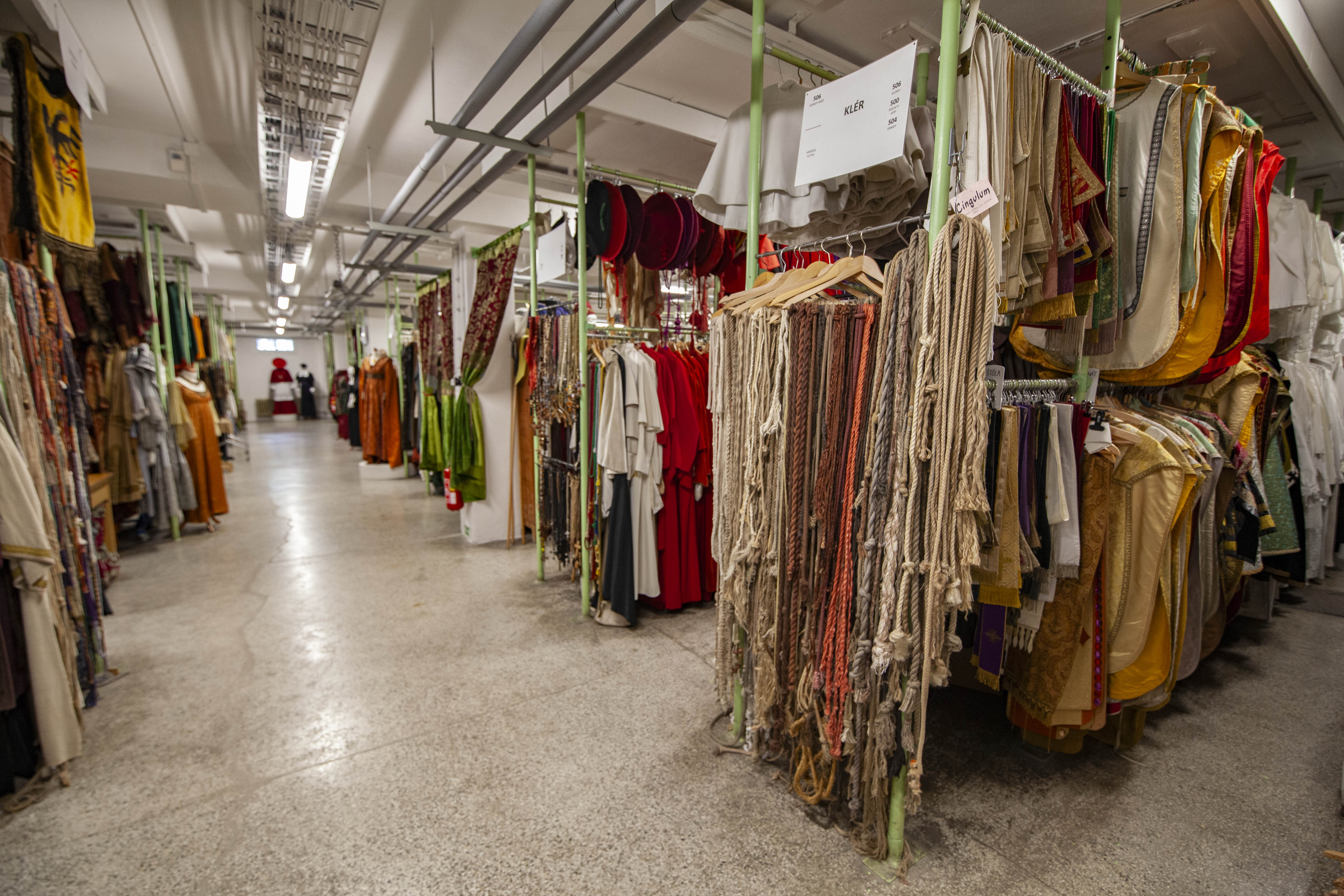
Costume rental

== Notable productions ==
=== 1940s ===
- Clothes Make the Man (1940, with Heinz Rühmann and Hertha Feiler)
- Carl Peters (1940/41)
- Jud Süß (1940)
- Doctor Crippen (1942)
- Große Freiheit Nr. 7 (1943, with Hans Albers)
- Die Fledermaus (1945/46, with Johannes Heesters)
- Springtime (1945–47, by Grigory Alexandrov)

=== 1960s ===
- Lemonade Joe (1964)
- The Shop on Main Street (1965)
- Loves of a Blonde (1965)
- Daisies (1966)
- Closely Watched Trains (1966)
- Marketa Lazarová (1967)
- The Firemen's Ball (1967)
- The End of Agent W4C (1967)

=== 1970s ===
- The Last Act of Martin Weston (1970)
- Valerie and Her Week of Wonders (1970)
- Witchhammer (1970)
- Three Wishes for Cinderella (1973)
- Dinner for Adele (1977)

=== 1980s ===
- Blázni, vodníci a podvodníci (1980)
- Yentl (1983)
- Amadeus (1984)
- My Sweet Little Village (1985)
- Battle of Moscow (1985)
- Boris Godunov (1986)

=== 1990s ===
- Kafka (1991)
- The Elementary School (1991)
- The Young Indiana Jones Chronicles (1992)
- Stalingrad (1993)
- Immortal Beloved (1994)
- Underground (1995)
- Kolya (1996)
- Mission: Impossible (1996)
- Snow White: A Tale of Terror (1997)
- Les Misérables (1998)
- My Giant (1998)
- The Barber of Siberia (1998)
- Plunkett & Macleane (1999)
- Ravenous (1999)

=== 2000s ===
- Dungeons & Dragons (2000)
- Frank Herbert's Dune (2000)
- A Knight's Tale (2001)
- From Hell (2001)
- The Affair of the Necklace (2001)
- The Bourne Identity (2002)
- XXX (2002)
- Blade II (2002)
- Bad Company (2002)
- Hart's War (2002)
- The League of Extraordinary Gentlemen (2003)
- Hitler: The Rise of Evil (2003)
- Frank Herbert's Children of Dune (2003)
- Shanghai Knights (2003)
- The Mystery of the Third Planet (2003, Czech dubbing production)
- Chasing Liberty (2004)
- The Prince and Me (2004)
- Alien vs. Predator (2004)
- Hellboy (2004)
- Van Helsing (2004)
- Eurotrip (2004)
- Oliver Twist (2005)
- The Brothers Grimm (2005)
- Doom (2005)
- Alias (season 4) (2005)
- A Sound of Thunder (2005)
- Everything Is Illuminated (2005)
- Hostel (2005)
- The Chronicles of Narnia: The Lion, the Witch and the Wardrobe (2005)
- Tristan and Isolde (2006)
- Last Holiday (2006)
- The Illusionist (2006)
- The Omen (2006)
- Casino Royale (2006)
- Hannibal Rising (2007)
- Hostel: Part 2 (2007)
- Babylon A.D. (2007)
- The Chronicles of Narnia: Prince Caspian (2008)
- G.I. Joe: The Rise of Cobra (2009)
- The Philanthropist (TV series) (2009)
- Solomon Kane (2009)

=== 2010s ===
- Burnt by the Sun 2 (2010)
- Faust (2011)
- Mission: Impossible – Ghost Protocol (2011)
- Borgia (2011)
- A Royal Affair (2012)
- The Hypnotist (2012)
- Snowpiercer (2013)
- Crossing Lines (2013)
- Serena (2014)
- Child 44 (2015)
- Last Knights (2015)
- Anthropoid (2016)
- A United Kingdom (2016)
- The Zookeeper's Wife (2016)
- Unlocked (2017)
- The Aftermath (2019)
- Jojo Rabbit (2019)

=== 2020s ===
- Tribes of Europa (2021)
- Carnival Row (2021)
- The Wheel of Time (2021)
- Interview with the Vampire (2022)
- Girl America (2024)
- Nosferatu (2024)
- Broken Voices (2025)
- Blade Runner 2099 (2026)

== See also ==
- Prague Studios
