= Murder in the Blue Room =

1944 film by Leslie Goodwins

- Official theatrical poster
- Directed by: Leslie Goodwins
- Screenplay by: I. A. L. Diamond; Stanley Davis
- Story by: Arnold Lippschitz
- Based on: Geheimnis des Blauen Zimmers by Arnold Lippschitz
- Produced by: Frank Gross
- Starring: Grace McDonald; June Preisser; Betty Kean; Anne Gwynne; John Litel
- Cinematography: George Robinson
- Edited by: Charles Maynard
- Production company: Universal Pictures
- Distributed by: Universal Pictures
- Release date: 1944
- Running time: 61 minutes
- Country: United States
- Language: English

Murder in the Blue Room is a 1944 American horror mystery film, directed by Leslie Goodwins.

== Plot ==
The Kirkland country house is supposed to be haunted. This reputation rests on the sinister Blue Room, where the owner Kirkland met his death. When his widow remarries, the new husband resolves to reopen the old house and solve the murder mystery once and for all. The house guests are musical-comedy trio The Three Jazzy Belles; two rivals for daughter Nan's affections; and the family doctor. One of the rivals retires to the Blue Room and is found murdered the next morning. The other rival occupies the Blue Room that night and disappears. The Three Jazzy Belles take it upon themselves to solve the mystery.

== Cast ==
- Grace McDonald as Peggy
- June Preisser as Jerry
- Betty Kean as Betty
- Anne Gwynne as Nan Kirkland
- John Litel as Frank Baldrich
- Donald Cook as Steve Randall
- Regis Toomey as Inspector McDonald
- Nella Walker as Dorothy Craig
- Andrew Tombes as Dr. Carroll
- Bill MacWilliams as Larry

== Background ==
The plot is based on the 1932 German film Secret of the Blue Room. Universal Pictures remade it three times: as the Pre-Code murder-mystery film Secret of the Blue Room (1933), then as The Missing Guest (1938), and finally as Murder in the Blue Room (1944).

Murder in the Blue Room was originally intended for the Ritz Brothers (Harry, Jimmy, and Al), whose recent films presented them as a vaudeville act (The Three Jolly Jesters, The Three Merry Madcaps, The Three Funny Bunnies). The next project had the comedy trio scheduled to play The Three Mad Hatters. After the Ritzes left the studio, the studio recast the film with Grace McDonald, June Preisser, and Betty Kean as The Three Jazzy Belles. Betty Kean recalled in an interview that the Ritz script wasn't even modified; she was told to read the wisecracking lines assigned to "Harry".

== Reception ==
Reviews were mixed. Helen McNamara of Motion Picture Daily gave the film a rave review: "Universal is pretty much justified in calling this 'The Merriest of Musical Mysteries.' The combination of murder, mystery, and music here is riotously funny. The cast, with a better-than-average story, good gags, and clever musical routines apparently enjoyed the shenanigans to the utmost. This looks like a real winner, apparently unanticipated." Film Daily called the film only "passable entertainment" but appreciated the comedy scenes written for the Ritz Brothers: "The trio of Grace McDonald, Betty Kean, and June Preisser steals the film, being responsible for most of the entertainment and all of the laughs. The gals dance, sing, and rush about in trying to solve a murder mystery." The Exhibitor was neutral: "Mark this down for the lower half [of a double feature], with the usual standard trimmings and fair comedy."
