= Sentiment (film) =

- Directed by: Tomáš Hejtmánek
- Written by: Tomáš Hejtmánek, Jiří Soukup
- Starring: Jiří Kodet
- Cinematography: Diviš Marek, Jaromír Kačer
- Music by: Martin Smolka
- Production companies: Bionaut Films; Czech Television; Filio
- Release date: 6 November 2003
- Running time: 76 minutes
- Country: Czech Republic
- Language: Czech

Sentiment is a 2003 Czech drama film directed by Tomáš Hejtmánek. It stars Jiří Kodet as František Vláčil. The film is based on Hejtmánek's meeting with Vláčil. The film was originally meant to be a documentary that would consist of an interview with Vláčil himself but Vláčil died before the shooting started which led to changes of the film. Preparations of the film started in 1996.

== Plot ==
The film consists mostly of Vláčil's monologue as he talks about his career as a filmmaker. Some actors who appeared in his films also make appearance such as Ivan Palúch, František Velecký or Emma Černá. The film ends when Vláčil dies.

== Cast ==
- Jiří Kodet as František Vláčil
- Emma Černá
- Jan Kačer
- Ivan Palúch
- František Velecký
