= Jan Otčenášek =

Czech writer

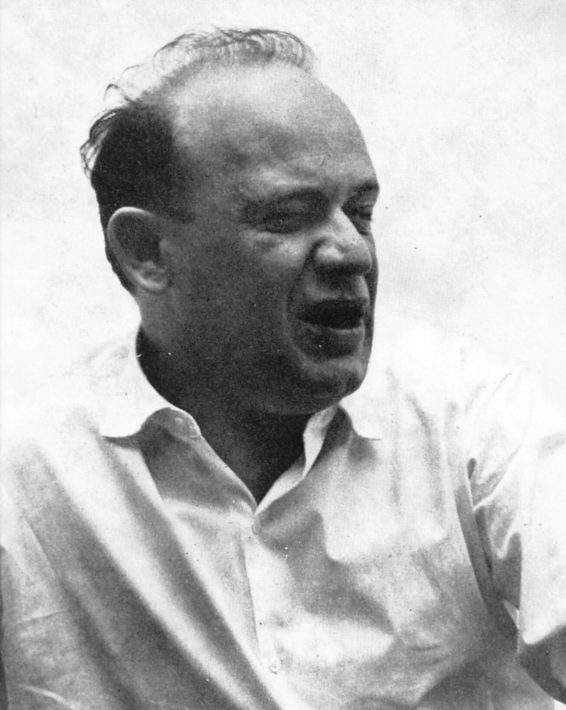
Jan Otčenášek in 1964

Jan Otčenášek (19 November 1924 in Prague – 24 February 1979 in Prague) was a Czech novelist and playwright.

== Biography ==
Otčenášek was born in the Žižkov district of Prague. His father was a joiner. He graduated from business school in 1943, briefly worked in Germany, then was employed at the Avia Motors factory.

After the war, Otčenášek became involved in a pro-communist group known as Předvoj (Avant-garde), which was illegal at the time. Later, he joined the Communist Party and studied aesthetics at Charles University, although he had to drop out due to family problems. From 1947 to 1951, he worked for the Chemical and Metallurgical Industry Association as an export official. This was followed by a position in the Secretariat of the Union of Czechoslovak Writers.

In 1960, he decided to become a freelance writer. From 1973 on, he was a screenwriter at Barrandov Studios. For twenty years, he lived with the actress, Libuše Švormová.

He died in Prague, of lung cancer.

== Works ==
Limping Orpheus (Kulhavý Orfeus) is a semiautobiographical description of resistance by a group of young people mobilised by the Germans as munitions workers in the Totaleinsatz. His most popular work, Romeo, Juliet and Darkness (Romeo, Julie a tma), about a young couple during the Nazi occupation, after the assassination of Reinhard Heydrich was, in 1960, made into a film, directed by Jiří Weiss and starring Ivan Mistrík, Daniela Smutná, and Jiřina Šejbalová. In 1963 it was made into an opera by the Soviet composer Kirill Molchanov.
