= Vlčí jáma =

Vlčí jáma may refer to:

- Vlčí jáma (novel), a 1938 Czech psychological novel, written by Jarmila Glazarová
- Vlčí jáma (film), a 1957 Czech drama film
