= The Secret of the Blue Room =

1933 film by Kurt Neumann

- Original theatrical poster
- Directed by: Kurt Neumann
- Screenplay by: William Hurlbut
- Story by: Arnold Lippschitz
- Based on: Geheimnis des blauen Zimmers
- Produced by: Carl Laemmle, Jr.; Henry Henigson
- Starring: Lionel Atwill; Gloria Stuart; Paul Lukas
- Cinematography: Charles Stumar
- Edited by: Philip Cahn
- Music by: Heinz Letton
- Production company: Universal Pictures
- Distributed by: Universal Pictures
- Release date: July 20, 1933
- Running time: 66 minutes
- Country: United States
- Budget: $69,000

The Secret of the Blue Room is a 1933 American pre-Code horror mystery film directed by Kurt Neumann and starring Lionel Atwill, Gloria Stuart, Paul Lukas, and Edward Arnold. A remake of the German film Geheimnis des blauen Zimmers (1932), it concerns a group of wealthy people who stay at a European mansion that features a blue room that is said to be cursed, as everyone who has stayed there has died shortly after. Three people suggest a wager that each can survive a night in the blue room.

Filmed over a six-day period in June 1933, The Secret of the Blue Room was Universal Pictures' least-expensive production that year. It was released theatrically in July 1933, and was met by mixed reviews from critics, receiving praise for its performances, but criticism for its formulaic plot devices. Universal later remade the film as The Missing Guest (1938) and Murder in the Blue Room (1944).

== Plot ==
At her family's rural manor in Germany, Irene von Helldorf celebrates her twenty-first birthday with her father Robert, her suitor Thomas Brandt, and Thomas's two rivals, Walter Brink and Frank Faber. Thomas challenges Walter and Frank to each spend a night in a mysterious locked blue room in which several murders had occurred years before, each at exactly one hour past midnight. The first victim was Robert's sister, followed by his best friend and, later, a detective who attempted to solve their deaths. Thomas sleeps there on the first night but disappears exactly at 1:00 a.m.

Irene explores the blue room alone the following day, but is attacked by an unseen assailant and loses consciousness, regaining it with no memory of her attacker's identity. Frank agrees to spend the night in the blue room after Robert retires for the evening. Frank begins playing a piano in the room shortly after midnight to signal to the others that he is still alive. Unable to sleep, Irene is comforted by Walter before a gunshot rings out, and the piano playing ceases. Walter rushes to the blue room, where he finds Frank shot to death.

Walter reports Frank's murder to Commissioner Forster. Moments later, an alert buzzer sounds from the blue room. Walter enters the room to find a cat has triggered the buzzer, but cannot explain how the animal accessed the room. The next morning, the Commissioner and his assistant Max question the von Helldorfs and their guests, along with Mary and Betty, servants of the manor, and Paul, the butler. Betty tells the Commissioner that she saw a strange man exit the blue room after Frank's murder.

The next day, an apparent vagrant enters the manor, and Robert confesses to the Commissioner in confidence that the man is his brother, who is in fact Irene's biological father. On the fifth night, the Commissioner oversees the manor while Walter stays in the blue room, hoping they can apprehend the killer. Walter places a dummy in an armchair in the blue room and hides behind a coat. At exactly 1:00 a.m., the assailant breaches the door to the blue room and aims a revolver at the dummy before firing.

The cloaked assailant flees into an underground corridor system that runs beneath the manor, with Walter and the Commissioner's officers in pursuit. Following a gunfight, the killer is apprehended and revealed to be Tommy. Tommy confesses to killing Frank and plotting Walter's death out of jealousy, believing both men were threats against his relationship to Irene.

== Cast ==
- Lionel Atwill as Robert von Helldorf
- Gloria Stuart as Irene von Helldorf
- Paul Lukas as Captain Walter Brink
- Edward Arnold as Commissioner Forster
- Onslow Stevens as Frank Faber
- William Janney as Tommy Brandt
- Robert Barrat as Paul
- Muriel Kirkland as Betty
- Russell Hopton as Max
- Elizabeth Patterson as Mary

== Style ==
The authors of the book Universal Horror describe The Secret of the Blue Room as an "engaging example of the early 'spooky house' mystery" and observe that it "had all the recognizable elements of the classic Universal horror films ... for all the atmosphere the picture unmistakably remains a whodunit at heart."

== Production ==
The Secret of the Blue Room was produced on a budget of $69,000, making it the cheapest Universal Studios production of 1933. The film was a remake of the 1932 German mystery film Geheimnis des blauen Zimmers. According to The Hollywood Reporter, Lillian Bond was cast as Betty but was replaced by Muriel Kirkland. Lionel Atwill was announced to have joined the cast in May 1933. At the time of the film's release, Atwill stated he considered it his finest role to date. The film was shot over a six-day period in June 1933 on the Universal Studios lot in Los Angeles. Portions were filmed on sets that also appeared in James Whale's The Old Dark House (1932), in which Stuart had also starred.

== Release ==
The Secret of the Blue Room was released theatrically in the United States on July 20, 1933, and later received theatrical release in England and Canada in late December of that year. Beginning in the late 1950s, the film received a revival through television syndication, frequently airing on late-night cable as part of the Shock Theater series.

Universal remade the film twice: First as The Missing Guest (1938), and later as, Murder in the Blue Room (1944).

=== Home media ===
The Secret of the Blue Room was released on DVD on October 16, 2014, as part of the Universal Vault Series. Kino Lorber issued a Blu-ray edition on November 2, 2021.

== Reception ==
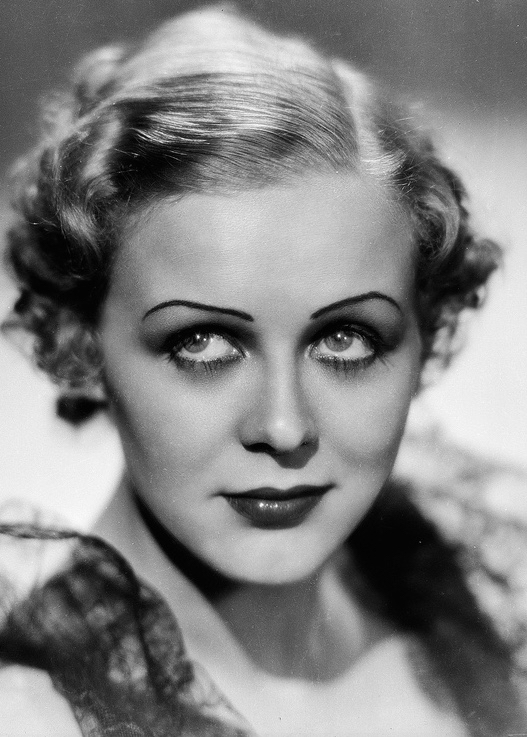
Gloria Stuart, pictured in 1933, received praise for her performance in the film

In a contemporary review, Richard Watts Jr. of the New York Herald Tribune found that despite being a bit too formulaic, the film was "better than a number of previous efforts of its school" but contained a "grand cast." A review in The Film Weekly similarly observed that the performances by Paul Lukas, Gloria Stuart, and Lionel Atwill were "worthy of a stronger and less threadbare story."

Mordaunt Hall of The New York Times compared the film to The Old Dark House, stating that the film "lopes along in quite an interesting fashion until it comes to the denouement, which is by no means as satisfactory as might be anticipated." Wanda Hale of The New York Daily News stated that the story was "too unreasonable for words." A review published by the Brooklyn Times-Union also remarked the film's plot contrivances that are "never explained and which seem to have no bearing on the main theme," but conceded that the film overall was "entertaining as thrillers go."

Tom Weaver, Michael Brunas and John Brunas commented in their book Universal Horrors that "most of the early Universal mysteries that masquerade as horror films are fairly dismal" but declared this film as "a minor gem ... probably one of the best of Universal's non-horror horror films."

Film historian Ken Hanke notes in A Critical Guide to Horror Film Series that the film's sense of atmosphere and its strong cast distinguishes it amongst its contemporaries. Writer Bruce Markusen similarly notes in his book Hosted Horror on Television: The Films and Faces of Shock Theater, Creature Features and Chiller Theater (2021) that the actors, particularly Stuart, "handle the material well, especially given the whirlwind six-day shooting schedule imposed by director Kurt Neumann," but felt that it lacked a discernible monstrous villain and resolution for some of its secondary plot elements.

In a retrospective review for DVD Talk, Stuart Galbraith praised the film, writing: "Of Universal's horror wannabes, The Secret of the Blue Room is not only one of the best, but far superior to many "official" Universal Horrors, making for a very entertaining 66 minutes."

== Sources ==
- Glut, Donald F. (2012). Shock Theatre Chicago Style: WBKB-TV's Late Night Horror Showcase, 1957-1959. Jefferson, North Carolina: McFarland & Company. ISBN 978-0-786-46805-8.
- Hanke, Ken (2013) [1991]. A Critical Guide to Horror Film Series. London, England: Routledge. ISBN 978-1-317-92882-9.
- Mank, Gregory William (2009) [1998]. Hollywood's Maddest Doctors: Lionel Atwill, Colin Clive, and George Zucco. Baltimore, Maryland: Midnight Marquee Press. ISBN 978-1-887-66422-6.
- Markusen, Bruce (2021). Hosted Horror on Television: The Films and Faces of Shock Theater, Creature Features and Chiller Theater. Jefferson, North Carolina: McFarland & Company. ISBN 978-1-476-68461-1.
- Weaver, Tom; Brunas, Michael; Brunas, John (2007) [1990]. Universal Horrors (2 ed.). Jefferson, North Carolina: McFarland & Company. ISBN 978-0-7864-2974-5.
