= Beda Batka =

Czech-American cinematographer

- Born: Bedřich Baťka; August 21, 1922; Prague, Czechoslovakia (now Czech Republic)
- Died: June 6, 1994 (aged 71); Floral Park, New York, United States
- Occupation: Cinematographer
- Years active: 1963–1980

Beda Batka (Czech: Bedřich Baťka; August 21, 1922 – June 6, 1994) was a Czech and American cinematographer and a teacher in the Tisch School of the Arts.

Batka started his career as a camera operator on the movie On the Right Track (1948). In Czechoslovakia he frequently worked with director Jiří Weiss. Batka told Weiss a story that happened at his wife's workplace. Weiss decided to use this story as a basis for his film Ninety Degrees in the Shade. In 1967 Batka was a director of photography for František Vláčil's Marketa Lazarová, which was later voted the best Czech movie of all time. After he emigrated to USA, he taught cinematography at the Tisch School of the Arts. Among his students and proteges were Fred Elmes, Barry Sonnenfeld, Bill Pope, and Ken Kelsch. The best known movie he worked on in America was Little Darlings.

== Filmography ==
| Year | Title | Notes |
|---|---|---|
| 1963 | Fear | |
| 1963 | The Golden Fern | |
| 1964 | Láska nebeská | Short film |
| 1965 | Ninety Degrees in the Shade | |
| 1966 | Sign of the Cancer | |
| 1966 | Marketa Lazarová | |
| 1967 | Four in a Circle | |
| 1972 | In Pursuit of Treasure | |
| 1979 | The Orphan | |
| 1980 | Little Darlings | |
