= Konec starých časů =

Konec starých časů may refer to:

- Konec starých časů (novel), Czech novel by Vladislav Vančura
  - The End of Old Times, 1989 film based on the novel
