= Háj ve Slezsku =

- Municipality
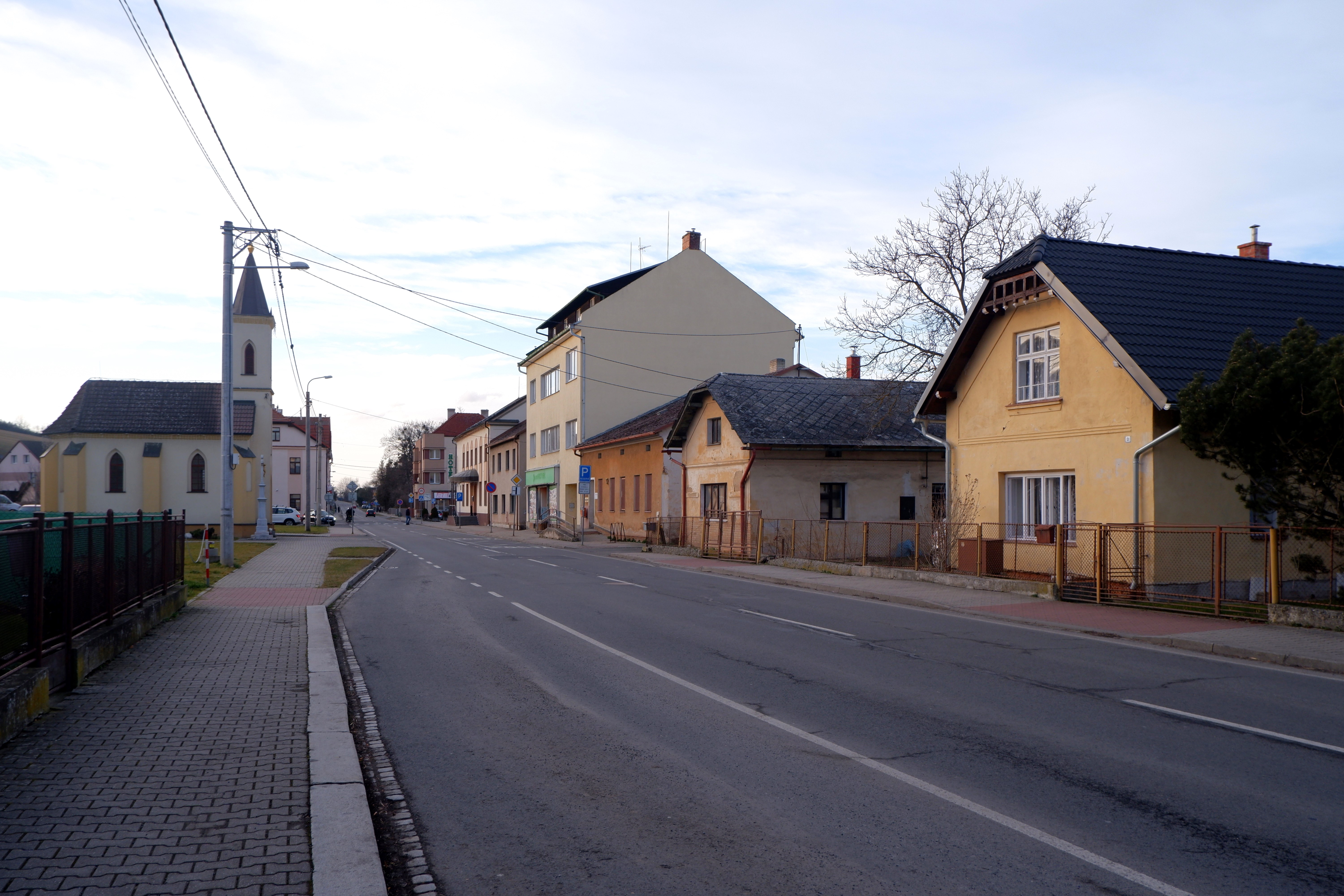
- Antonína Vaška Street

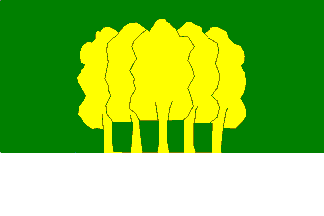
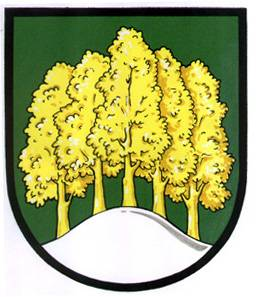
- Flag Coat of arms

- Location in the Czech Republic
- Coordinates: 49°54′0″N 18°5′35″E
- Country: Czech Republic
- Region: Moravian-Silesian
- District: Opava
- First mentioned: 1377

Area
  - Total: 13.79 km^{2} (5.32 sq mi)
- Elevation: 235 m (771 ft)

Population (2026-01-01)
  - Total: 3,241
  - Density: 235.0/km^{2} (608.7/sq mi)
- Time zone: UTC+1 (CET)
  - Summer (DST): UTC+2 (CEST)
- Postal code: 747 92
- Website: www.hajveslezsku.cz

Háj ve Slezsku (Czech pronunciation: [ˈɦaːj ˈvɛ slɛsku]; German: Freiheitsau) is a municipality and village in Opava District in the Moravian-Silesian Region of the Czech Republic. It has about 3,200 inhabitants.

== Administrative division ==
Háj ve Slezsku consists of five municipal parts (in brackets population according to the 2021 census):

- Háj ve Slezsku (76)
- Chabičov (1,254)
- Jilešovice (318)
- Lhota (595)
- Smolkov (936)

== Etymology ==
The name of the municipality means 'grove in Silesia' in Czech.

== Geography ==
Háj ve Slezsku is located about 8 kilometres (5 mi) northwest of Ostrava and 13 km (8 mi) east of Opava. The northern part of the municipality lies in the Opava Hilly Land, the southern part is located in the Nízký Jeseník range. The highest point is at 364 m (1,194 ft) above sea level. The municipality is situated on the right bank of the Opava River, which forms the northern municipal border.

== History ==
First settlements in the area of today's municipality were probably established in the 13th century. The first written mention of Chabičov and Smolkov is from 1377. The youngest village is Háj, which was established in 1784 as a part of Chabičov. It was its administrative part until 1922. By the unification of Chabičov, Háj and Smolkov, it officially became an independent municipality, and the three villages became municipal parts. Since 1970, the municipality is called Háj ve Slezsku. Jilešovice and Lhota were incorporated in 1979.

== Demographics ==
Historical population

Year	Pop.	±%
1869	1,649	—
1880	1,808	+9.6%
1890	1,891	+4.6%
1900	2,211	+16.9%
1910	2,621	+18.5%

Year	Pop.	±%
1921	2,657	+1.4%
1930	3,302	+24.3%
1950	2,935	−11.1%
1961	3,314	+12.9%
1970	3,307	−0.2%

Year	Pop.	±%
1980	3,368	+1.8%
1991	3,299	−2.0%
2001	3,312	+0.4%
2011	3,249	−1.9%
2021	3,179	−2.2%

Source: Censuses

== Transport ==
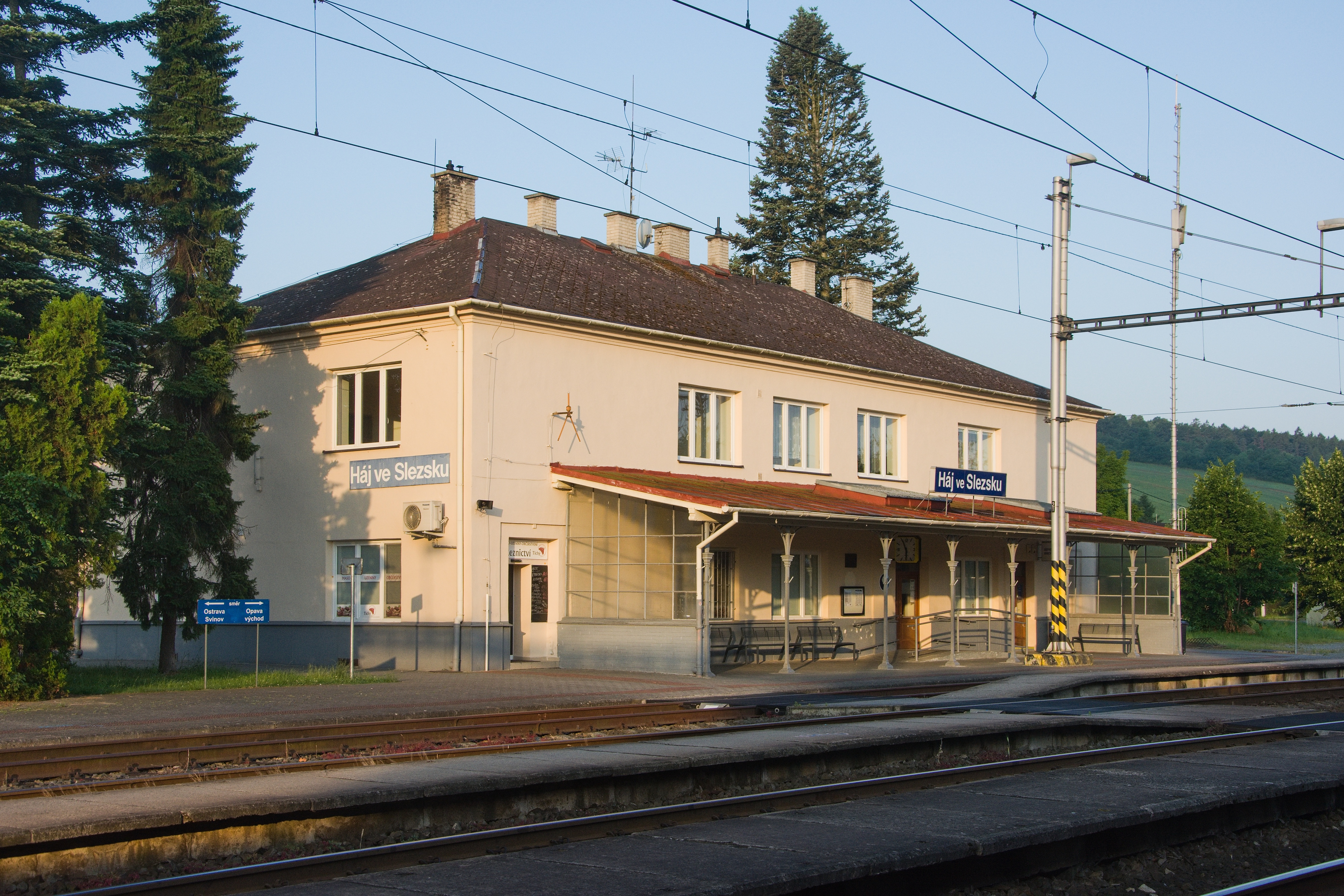
Train station

Háj ve Slezsku is located on the railway line Ostrava–Opava.

== Culture ==
The municipality organises an annual folklore festival named Rozmarné léto after the most famous novel of local native Vladislav Vančura.

== Sights ==
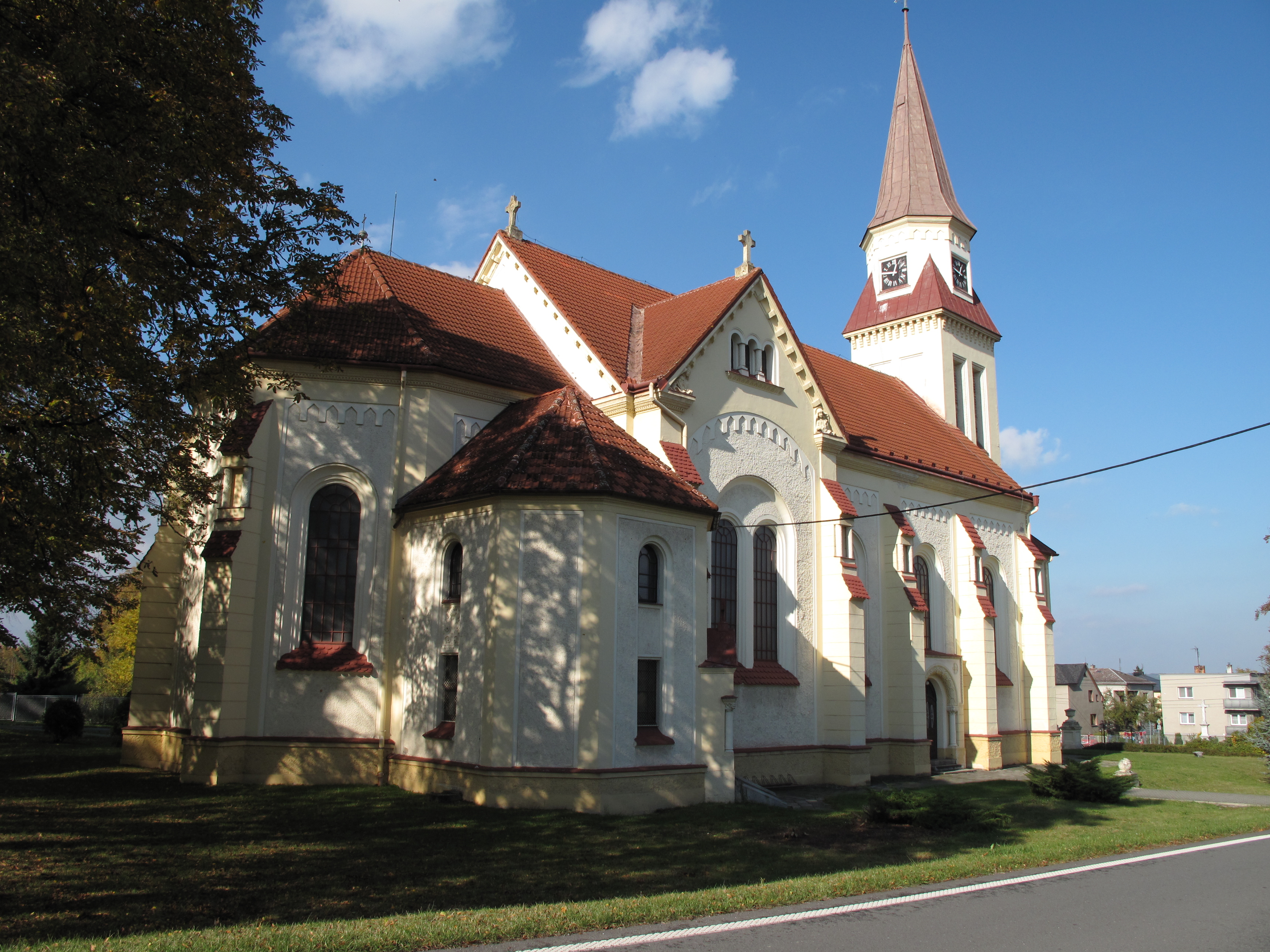
Church of Saint Valentine

The main landmark is the Church of Saint Valentine in Chabičov. It was built in 1910–1911. The architectural concept combines Neo-Romanesque, Art Nouveau and Art Deco elements.

== Notable people ==
- Vladislav Vančura (1891–1942), writer
