= Wolf Trap (film) =

- Theatrical release poster
- Directed by: Jiří Weiss
- Written by: Jiří Weiss; Jiří Brdečka
- Based on: Vlčí jáma by Jarmila Glazarová
- Starring: Miroslav Doležal; Jiřina Šejbalová; Jana Brejchová
- Cinematography: Václav Hanuš
- Edited by: Miroslav Hájek
- Music by: Jiří Srnka
- Production company: Filmové studio Barrandov
- Distributed by: Ústřední půjčovna filmů
- Release date: 23 May 1958
- Running time: 95 minutes
- Country: Czechoslovakia
- Language: Czech

Wolf Trap (Czech: Vlčí jáma) is a 1957 Czech drama film by Jiří Weiss, based on the 1938 Jarmila Glazarová's novel of the same name.

== Plot ==
Orphaned 18-year-old girl Jana comes to live with a childless couple – Robert and Klára, his much older wife. Robert falls in love with Jana.

== Production ==
The film was shot in Sobotka and Stromovka park in Prague. Interior scenes were shot in Hostivař Studios. The first choice for the role of Jana was an actress Jana Rybářová, who committed suicide before the start of the shooting.

== Cast ==
- Miroslav Doležal as Mayor Robert Rýdl
- Jiřina Šejbalová as Klára Rýdlová
- Jana Brejchová as Jana, their foster daughter
- Jaroslav Průcha as Family physician
- Libuše Freslová as Schillingerová
- Lola Skrbková as Maid Petronila
- Alena Kreuzmannová as Gertruda
- Josef Kozák as Frýdecký
- František Holar as Grocer

== Awards and nominations ==
Venice Film Festival

- Won: FIPRESCI Award
- Won: New Cinema Award
- Won: Special Jury Award for Jiřina Šejbalová
- Nominated: Golden Lion
