= Romeo, Juliet and Darkness =

1959 Czech film by Jiří Weiss

- Directed by: Jiří Weiss
- Written by: Jan Otčenášek; Jiří Weiss
- Based on: Romeo and Juliet; 1597 play by William Shakespeare
- Starring: Ivan Mistrík; Daniela Smutná
- Cinematography: Václav Hanuš
- Edited by: Miloslav Hájek
- Music by: Jiří Srnka
- Production company: Ceskoslovenský Státní Film
- Distributed by: Cinelatino
- Release date: 1960
- Running time: 94 minutes
- Country: Czechoslovakia
- Language: Czech

Romeo, Juliet and Darkness (Czech: Romeo, Julie a tma) is a 1960 Czech drama film directed by Jiří Weiss. Inspired by William Shakespeare's Romeo and Juliet, the film is about problems experienced by a young Jewish woman who is hidden from the Gestapo by a student lover. In 1997 a TV adaptation of the same name was directed by Karel Smyczek.

== Plot ==
In Nazi-occupied Prague in May 1942, Pavel (Ivan Mistrík) hides the young Jew Hanka (Daniela Smutná) to keep her from being sent to a concentration camp. Over the following three weeks the two fall in love. But when Hanka is discovered and Pavel is threatened, she flees into the streets in the middle of Operation Anthropoid—the Czech government-in-exile's plot to assassinate Reinhard Heydrich—and is killed.

== Cast ==
- Ivan Mistrík as Pavel
- Daniela Smutná as Hanka
- Jiřina Šejbalová as Pavel's mother
- František Smolík as Grandfather
- Blanka Bohdanová as Kubiasová
- Eva Mrázová as Alena
- Karla Chadimová as Josefka
- Miroslav Svoboda as Würm

== Reception ==
Romeo, Juliet, and Darkness won the Golden Seashell at the 1960 San Sebastian International Film Festival. It also won the Grand Prix at the 1960 Taormina International Film Festival.
