= The Mystery of the Blue Room =

- Czech: Záhada modrého pokoje
- Directed by: Miroslav Cikán
- Screenplay by: Karel Hašler
- Based on: Secret of the Blue Room, screenplay by Arnold Lippschitz
- Starring: Karel Hašler; František Kovářík; Jaroslav Marvan
- Cinematography: Jan Stallich
- Edited by: Antonín Zelenka
- Music by: Karel Hašler; Heinz Letton
- Production company: Lepka
- Distributed by: Lepka
- Release date: 3 February 1933
- Running time: 70 minutes
- Country: Czechoslovakia

The Mystery of the Blue Room (Czech: Záhada modrého pokoje) is a 1933 Czechoslovak mystery film, directed by Miroslav Cikán. It is a remake of the German film Secret of the Blue Room (1932). It stars Karel Hašler, František Kovářík, and Jaroslav Marvan.

== Synopsis ==
At a country house, to impress his girlfriend a young man volunteers to spend the night in the famous Blue Room where a notorious murder took place many years before. In the morning he has completely vanished.

== Cast ==
- Karel Hašler as Count Hellford
- František Kovářík as Valet Pavel
- Jaroslav Marvan as Inspector Gent
- Antonín Novotný
- Helena Sedláková as Betty
- Jiřina Šejbalová as Countess Hellford
- František Smolík as the Stranger
- Milada Smolíková as Marie
- Jan Sviták as Naval officer
- Miroslav Svoboda as Tom Brandt
- Bedřich Vrbský as Betectiv Brown
- Rudolf Žák as Plainclothes Man

== Bibliography ==
- Alfred Krautz. International Directory of Cinematographers Set and Costume Designers in Film: Czechoslovakia. Saur, 1991.
