= Vášáryová =

Vášáryová is a surname. Notable people with the surname include:

- Emília Vášáryová (born 1942), one of the most prominent contemporary Slovak actresses
- Magdaléna Vášáryová (also known as Magda Vášáryová), (born 1948), Slovak actress and diplomat
