= Otčenášek =

Otčenášek, female Otčenášková is a Czech surname. Czech: Otčenáš is Lord's Prayer. Notable people with the surname include:

- Karel Otčenášek (1918–2011), Czech prelate of the Roman Catholic Church
- Jan Otčenášek (1924–1979), Czech novelist
