= Antonín Kachlík =

Czech film director (1923–2022)

- Born: 26 February 1923; Kladno, Czechoslovakia
- Died: 20 April 2022 (aged 99)
- Occupations: Film director, screenwriter
- Years active: 1948–1987

Antonín Kachlík (26 February 1923 – 20 April 2022) was a Czech film director and screenwriter. He directed 21 films between 1948 and 1987. In 1973, he was a member of the jury at the 8th Moscow International Film Festival.

== Early life and education ==
Kachlík was born in Rozdělov, Czechoslovakia (now Kladno-Rozdělov). He grew up in Malá Dobrá until 1931, when his family relocated to Prague. He attended the Prague-Karlín trade academy. During World War II, Kachlík joined an underground resistance movement where he printed and distributed leftist leaflets, and after graduating from school in 1942, he was forced into working for Germany as a member of the fire brigades in the Ruhr area. Here, he helped the Germans clean up debris after the Allied Forces' nightly air raids.

After World War II, he attended the College of Political and Social Sciences, before applying for an education at the Film Academy (FAMU) in 1946. He ended up graduating from the Film Academy in 1950.

After graduating, Kachlík went to Zlín to work as a dramaturge in the Workers’ Theatre, before joining the military in 1952, and serving until 1954.

== Professional life ==
Kachlík began his directing career by working as second director, with Josef Mach and Bořivoj Zeman. He then made his lead-directorial debut in 1961 with the drama Červnové dny, and continued to direct films until 1988. Between 1961 and 1983, Kachlík wrote multiple screenplays, and over the course of his life he wrote a total of five books, with the last one being written in 2003. Between the years of 1971-1992 he taught at FAMU.

Kachlík received criticism for directing a biographical film about communist leader Klement Gottwald, called the Dvacátý devátý.

== Personal life ==
Kachlík died on 20 April 2022, at the age of 99. He was married to actress Květoslava („Květa“) Houdlová. Their daughter Kateřina Kachlíková (born 1953) is a Czech mezzo-soprano.

== Selected filmography ==
- Červnové dny (1961)
- Bylo nás deset (1963)
- Třiatřicet stříbrných křepelek (1965)
- Death Behind a Curtain (1967)
- Já, truchlivý bůh (1969)
- Princ Bajaja (1971)
- We, the Lost Girls (1972)
- Zločin v Modré hvězdě (1974)
- Dvacátý devátý (1975)
- Kouzelné dobrodružství (1983)
- Kouzelníkův návrat (1985)
- On a Wayward Princess (1987)
