= And Give My Love to the Swallows =

- Directed by: Jaromil Jireš
- Written by: Jaromil Jireš
- Starring: Magdaléna Vášáryová
- Cinematography: Jan Curik
- Music by: Lubos Fiser
- Release date: 26 May 1972
- Running time: 90 minutes
- Country: Czechoslovakia
- Language: Czech

And Give My Love to the Swallows (Czech: ...a pozdravuji vlaštovky) is a 1972 Czech biographical film based on the prison diary from Czech resistance fighter Marie Kudeříková.

== Cast ==
- Magdaléna Vášáryová - Maruška Kudeříková
- Viera Strnisková - Mother
- Július Vašek - Father
- Václav Helšus - Julek
- Dagmar Bláhová - Julinka
- Hana Pastejríková - Jarka
- Hana Maciuchová - Vítezka
