= Já, truchlivý bůh =

1969 black-and-white Czech comedy film

- Directed by: Antonín Kachlík
- Written by: Antonín Kachlík; Milan Kundera
- Starring: Miloš Kopecký
- Cinematography: Jan Nemecek
- Edited by: Jaromír Janácek
- Release date: 17 October 1969
- Running time: 82 minutes
- Country: Czechoslovakia
- Language: Czech

Já, truchlivý bůh (I, Mournful God) is a 1969 black-and-white Czech comedy film directed by Antonín Kachlík. Based on stories from Milan Kundera's book Laughable Loves, it stars Miloš Kopecký as Adolf, who relates a tale of spurned love to his friend Apostol (Pavel Landovský). Adolf has his friend to pose as an opera conductor to seduce the young woman (Hana Lelitová), as she loves opera, and then spurn her.

== Cast ==
- Miloš Kopecký - Adolf
- Hana Lelitová - Janicka Malátová
- Pavel Landovský - Apostol Certikidis
- Jiřina Jirásková - Mrs. Stenclová
- Ivana Mixová - Cantatrice
- Kvetoslava Houdlová - Oculist
- Pavla Marsálková - Mrs. Malátová - mother
- Zdenek Kryzánek - Mr. Malát - father
- Jiří Přichystal - Singer
- Ilona Jirotková - Girlfriend
- Daniela Pokorná - Girlfriend
- Boleslava Svobodová - Ruzena
- Milivoj Uzelac - Conductor
- Helena Bendová - Housekeeper
- Vladimír Klemens - Music-master
