= Dravci (film) =

- Directed by: Jiří Weiss
- Written by: Jiří Weiss; Josef Mach
- Based on: Most by Miloslav Fábera
- Starring: Vítězslav Vejražka; L. H. Struna; Marie Nademlejnská
- Cinematography: Karel Degl
- Edited by: Antonín Zelenka
- Music by: E. F. Burian
- Production company: Československá filmová společnost
- Distributed by: Rozdělovna filmů Československého státního filmu
- Release date: 30 April 1948
- Running time: 92 minute
- Country: Czechoslovakia
- Language: Czech

Raptors (Czech: Dravci) is a 1948 Czechoslovak drama film directed by Jiří Weiss.

== Cast ==
- Vítězslav Vejražka as František Rýdl
- L. H. Struna as Václav Rýdl
- Marie Nademlejnská as Marie Rýdlová
- Saša Rašilov as Martin Žůrek
- Jindřich Plachta as Gardener Antonín Carda
- Jiří Plachý as Construction company owner Novotný
- Bohuš Záhorský as Businessman Kristián Krofta
- Viola Zinková as Irena
- Otomar Krejča as disponent Hrubý
