= Luck Will Come on Sunday =

1958 Slovak film

Luck Will Come on Sunday (Slovak: Šťastie príde v nedeľu) is a 1958 Slovak film directed by Ján Lacko. It stars Marián Kleis st., Ivan Mistrík, Anton Mrvečka, Renáta Kazíková (as Renáta Dočolomanská), and František Dibarbora. The film was a hit in Czechoslovakia, being popular mainly with a younger audience.

== Content ==
Emil, Števko alias "Vrabec" and Miško are three inseparable friends whose greatest passion is to play sports. Every Sunday they wait for the results and hope that one day they will manage to win a decent amount of money. Each of them has their own dream - Emil longs for a "Java 250", Vrabec would be fine with a "Pionier" and Miško hopes to go on his big trip around the world one day. However, none of them have had any luck in the game so far. They decide to solve this situation radically. Each of them will make every effort to get as much money as possible to play sports - this will automatically increase the probability of winning. But it is not as easy as it might seem at first glance. The situation between the friends becomes even more tense after they meet the attractive Eva Dvorčíková on a television show. She has been Mišek's platonic love for a long time, but he has not yet gathered the courage to speak to her. And since everything is allowed in love, the boys decide to draw lots. The one who wins will get the right to fight for Eva's love.

== Cast ==
- Marián Kleis st.—Emil
- Ivan Mistrík—Miško
- Anton Mrvečka—Števko alias "Vrabec"
- Renáta Kazíková (as Renáta Dočolomanská)—Eva Dvorčíková
- František Dibarbora—emcee and storyteller

== Film locations ==
- Bratislava
- Senec (Slnečné jazerá)
