= Princ Bajaja =

- Princ Bajaja
- Directed by: Antonín Kachlík
- Screenplay by: Antonín Kachlík; Eva Košlerová
- Story by: Božena Němcová
- Based on: Prince Bajaja by Božena Němcová
- Produced by: Eliška Nejedlá
- Starring: Ivan Palúch; Magda Vašáryová; František Velecký; Gustav Opočenský
- Edited by: Jaromír Janáček
- Music by: Vladimír Sommer
- Production company: Filmové Studio Barrandov
- Release date: December 17, 1971 (Czechoslovakia)
- Running time: 81 minutes
- Country: Czechoslovakia
- Language: Czech

Princ Bajaja is a 1971 Czechoslovak fantasy film based on the fairy tale Prince Bajaja by Božena Němcová. The film was directed by Antonín Kachlík.

== Plot ==
After the death of his parents, the young Prince Bajaja sets out to find his fortune. On his journey, he rescues an enchanted horse, who later comes to his aid. Disguised as a mute gardener, he gets acquainted with Princess Slavěna, who is to be sacrificed to a three-headed dragon on her 18th birthday. Her father, the king, is looking for a suitor for the princess, but no one is prepared to fight the dragon, except Bajaja, who receives magical armor from the enchanted horse. Despite being hurt, Bajaja defeats the dragon, but an evil knight takes credit for the deed.

== Cast ==
- Ivan Palúch - Prince Bajaja (Voiced by: Petr Štěpánek)
- Magda Vašáryová - Princess Slavěna
- František Velecký - The black knight (Voiced by: Petr Čepek)
- Gustav Opočenský - The King
- Petr Štěpánek – voice of the enchanted horse

== Production ==
"In the opening credits Eva Košlerová is presented as the author of the script. She covered up the authorship of the actual author František Pavlíček banned by the Communist regime for political reasons.", as noted on the Národní filmový archive entry of the film.

== Legacy ==
The film remains one of Antonín Kachlík's best-known productions.
