= 90 Degrees in the Shade =

1965 crime drama film by Jiří Weiss

90° in the Shade
- Film poster
- Directed by: Jiří Weiss
- Screenplay by: David Mercer
- Story by: Jiří Weiss; Jiří Mucha
- Produced by: Raymond Stross
- Starring: Anne Heywood; James Booth; Rudolf Hrušínský; Ann Todd; Donald Wolfit
- Cinematography: Bedřich Baťka
- Edited by: Jan Chaloupek; Russell Lloyd
- Music by: Luděk Hulan
- Production companies: Filmové studio Barrandov; Raymond Stross Productions
- Distributed by: Unger Films (US)
- Release date: 1 October 1965 (Czechoslovakia)
- Running time: 78 minutes (Czech cut); 90 minutes (English cut)
- Countries: United Kingdom; Czech Republic
- Languages: English; Czech

90 Degrees in the Shade (stylized as 90° in the Shade; Czech: Třicet jedna ve stínu) is a 1965 British-Czech crime drama film directed by Jiří Weiss. The screenplay was composed by David Mercer from a story written by Weiss and Jiří Mucha.

It was one of a series of films producer Raymond Stross made starring wife Anne Heywood. The film also co-starred James Booth, Rudolf Hrušínský, Ann Todd, and Donald Wolfit.

== Plot ==
The film opens with an auditor, Rudolf Kurka, arriving by bus on a hot summer day. He absorbs the scenery, including people-watching at a community pool. One of those people is assistant shop manager Alena Winter, whose lunch break concludes as she catches the trolleybus back to work. Rudolf misses the trolley and is resigned to walk instead. Eventually he arrives to meet Mr. Bažant, as they approach the same shop where Alena works—in order to audit it. Bažant introduces Rudolf to the employees, including Alena (whose hand he shakes for an uncomfortably long time). She then excuses herself to the stockroom, where she attempts to phone their manager, Milan Vorel, who is away on business, but to no avail.

Rudolf begins with the cash register, where he notices the first discrepancy. Marie explains she needed to borrow money and left a receipt in the till for how much she owed, which Bažant excused as acceptable. Rudolf, however, found this inappropriate, until Alena emerged with some cash to replace the missing funds, which satisfied him. Rudolf subsequently followed Alena upstairs to their stockroom in order to check upon their inventory. He detected another potential inconsistency between her counting and the store's ledger, but due to the extreme heat in the poorly ventilated room, she feigned a heat stroke in order to distract him. Shortly thereafter, the power goes out just as Milan conveniently returns from his business meeting. Rudolf declares they will finish tomorrow. He laments how he and Bažant do the same job, but people like him. Alena reassures him that he has no enemies.

Upon returning home, Rudolf greets his family with a steely awkwardness. He attempts to tutor his son Jirka in arithmetic, but the latter leaves the room frustrated by his rigid approach. His wife Kurková lies depressed in bed. Rudolf sniffs her glass to see if it is filled with alcohol, after she claims she has "another one of [her] headaches". Meanwhile, Alena returns home and begins having various flashbacks about her affair with Milan. In the process, she begins counting a large stack of cash. She then approaches her sister Věra in the adjacent room asking to see if she can lend her any more money. Věra says she cannot, but to try asking her husband Emil who has always had a soft spot for her sister. Alena visits him at the beauty parlor where he works, and he lends her what he has (although it is less than what she sought). She thanks him and departs.

Alena heads to the park to meet Milan, where the juxtaposition of their former clandestine affair and their current acrimonius dynamic is further emphasized. Milan attempts to put his arm around her in present day, which she rebuffs. She chides him for failing to put the expensive imported liqueur bottles back—which he had stolen and sold bootleg, with her compliance due to their relationship. In his car, she hands him the money she was able to raise. She also inquires about being transferred to another store location, to which he replies halfheartedly that it's in his boss's hands now.

They then begin their quest around the city to retrieve the precise liqueur bottles that were missing in the stockroom with no substitutions. Milan also confesses to being the one who caused the power to go out earlier during the audit. They visit several stores and eventually manage to acquire each bottle. They subsequently sneak in through the back door of the stockroom. Alena is startled by the refrigerator and begins laughing loudly. Milan tries to subdue her, but it leads to them making love on the couch. Meanwhile, Rudolf is chastised by his wife for not showing his son any affection.

The following morning, the audit resumes in the stockroom. While moving bottles from the top shelf to a lower shelf, Bažant inadvertently knocks one bottle down which smashes open. When he picks up the large broken piece, he notices the alleged cognac smells like tea. Rudolf orders more varieties examined, and they all smell like tea. Milan and Alena are both confused, and the latter cracks under pressure, running out of the store screaming, thus allowing suspicion to fall onto her. Rudolf's boss would prefer to be lenient, but Rudolf disagrees.

Alena visits Rudolf, attempting to explain herself. However, she chokes up, unable to do so. Mrs. Kurková becomes hysterical and causes a scene. Rudolf excuses himself and confiscates a bottle of alcohol underneath his wife's pillow, which he then dumps down the sink. Alena decides to leave. As she's leaving, she runs into Milan, who becomes paranoid. He also tries to reason with her that compared to her, as manager he would get prison time, while she would only get probation if she takes the fall. They argue and he slaps her, and suggests that his children will suffer for this. She says he "should have thought of them before", and walks home.

Back at home, Alena reminisces with a photo album of their good and bad times together. Then she tears the pages out of the book. Věra and Emil return home, bickering up the staircase. When they arrive at their door, it is bolted and they smell a gas leak. Causing a commotion, some neighbors are woken up, prompting a couple to assist breaking the door down. Emil rushes through the house to turn the gas off and break a window open. A suicide note rests on the chair near Alena, as they call an ambulance.

Rudolf arrives at the shop and learns of Alena's suicide attempt. He is also met with scorn from Bažant and Milan, who imply that it was his witch hunt which compelled her. He heads to the hospital to find Alena in a coma, where the doctor tells him she has a 50/50 chance of surviving. Rudolf begins to suspect Alena might have been protecting someone based on the note, and visits Milan "on impulse". He then returns to the hospital the following day to learn that Alena died. At the shop, a new assistant manager has arrived. Milan helps her and begins to flirt with her, only to see Rudolf's menacing stare outside the window. The film concludes with Rudolf arriving at the same waterfront spot by bus, gazing out at the waterfront.

== Cast ==
(All cast members provided their own Czech voices, unless otherwise indicated.)

- Anne Heywood as Alena Winter
  - (Czech voice) Alena Kreuzmannová as Alena Winter
- James Booth as Milan Vorel
  - (Czech voice) Otakar Brousek Sr. as Milan Vorel
- Rudolf Hrušínský as JUDr. Rudolf Kurka
- Ann Todd as Mrs. Kurková
  - (Czech voice) Zdenka Procházková as Mrs. Kurková
- Donald Wolfit as Mr. Bažant
  - (Czech voice) Čestmír Řanda as Mr. Bažant
- Jiřina Jirásková as Věra Burdová, Alena's sister
- Vladimír Menšík as Emil Burdová, Věra's husband
- Věra Tichánková as Rosa Vávrová
- Ladislav Potměšil as Jirka Kurka, Rudolf's son
- Jiří Sovák as Rudolf's director
- Oldřich Velen as Milan's criminal friend (from whom he gets owed money)
- Jorga Kotrbová as Hanka
- Valtr Taub as Lékar
- Vlasta Jelínková as Zena

== Reception ==
Variety wrote that the film: "has quality, mainly because of the shrewd and observant direction by Jiri Weiss, who is probably the most internationally known and respected of all Czech directors. It is largely thanks to this thoughtful direction that the film does not wind up as a trite, cliche-ridden piece of celluloid, but as a meaningful drama, in which emotion plays a larger role than reason in the life of a young and attractive woman. In less competent hands, this might well have been just a novelettish yarn, though some recognition is also due to David Mercer's sensitive seript."

== Awards and nominations ==
Berlin International Film Festival: Won, "UNICRIT Award" – Jiří Weiss.

Golden Globe Award: Nominated, "Best English-Language Foreign Film".
