= Viera Strnisková =

Slovak actress (1929–2013)

- Born: 30 October 1929; Hlohovec, Czechoslovakia
- Died: 31 August 2013 (aged 83); Bratislava, Slovakia
- Occupation: Actress
- Years active: 1948–2008
- Children: 2

Viera Strnisková (30 October 1929 – 31 August 2013) was a Slovak actress.

== Biography ==
Viera Strnisková was born on 30 October 1929 in Hlohovec and grew up in Modrý Kameň. Her father was a medical doctor and she often accompanied him to visit patients. Her mother was originally from Czechia.

Following the footsteps of her father, she enrolled to study medicine at the Comenius University but she failed to graduate. Later she unsuccessfully attempted to study law. Eventually, she graduated in theatre studies and literary science.

Already as a student, Strnisková started acting in the New Scene theatre in Bratislava. After graduation, Strnisková joined the Municipal Theatre of Kolín (1950-1951). Later, she acted in the theatre in Zvolen (1953-1957), Nitra (1957-1962), the Slovak National Theatre (1962-2004) and finally at the theatre of Spišská Nová Ves (2004-2008).

From 1950s, she was active also as a film and television actress. She debuted in the 1959 film the Nobleman and the Astronomer. Her most famous roles included the 1972 drama And Give My Love to the Swallows, the 1983 fairy tale The Salt Prince as well as the historical television drama series Alžbetin dvor (1986). Her last screen role was in the 2003 movie Dlhá krátka noc. She also regularly appeared in the long running TV program Sunday poetry moment.

Over the course of her long career, Strnisková became best known for playing the characters of strong women, typically mothers, suffering a tragic fate. In the theatre community, she was known for being very intellectually oriented and knowledgeable, in particular in the matters of literature.

== Death ==
Viera Strnisková died on 31 August 2013 in Bratislava at the age of 83.

== Personal life ==
In 2003 she was awarded the Pribina Cross, 2nd class by the president Rudolf Schuster.

Strnisková was married three times and had two daughters. Her second husband was the director Pavol Haspra.
