= Marketa Lazarová =

1967 Czechoslovak New Wave epic historical drama film by František Vláčil

- Promotional release poster
- Directed by: František Vláčil
- Screenplay by: František Pavlíček, František Vláčil
- Based on: Marketa Lazarová; 1931 novel by Vladislav Vančura
- Produced by: Josef Ouzký
- Starring: Magda Vášáryová; Josef Kemr; František Velecký; Naďa Hejná; Jaroslav Moučka
- Narrated by: Zdeněk Štěpánek
- Cinematography: Beda Batka
- Edited by: Miroslav Hájek
- Music by: Zdeněk Liška
- Production company: Barrandov Studios
- Distributed by: Ústřední půjčovna filmů
- Release dates: 6 October 1967 (Czechoslovakia); 30 August 1974 (United States)
- Running time: 165 minutes
- Country: Czechoslovakia
- Languages: Czech; German
- Budget: 12,733,000 Kčs
- Box office: 5,200,000 Kčs

Marketa Lazarová is a 1967 Czechoslovak New Wave epic period drama film directed by František Vláčil. It is an adaptation of the novel Marketa Lazarová (1931) by Vladislav Vančura. Set in the middle of 13th century when Christianity was taking over native Paganism in Central Europe, the film tells the story of a daughter of a feudal lord who is kidnapped by neighbouring robber knights shortly before she is to join a convent.

Marketa Lazarová was voted the all-time best Czech movie in a 1998 poll of Czech film critics and publicists. Although not quite as known as other Czechoslovak movies, it is highly regarded as one of the best historical movies ever made. The movie features surrealistic images throughout its run to increase the disorienting atmosphere.

Theodor Pištěk designed the costumes for the film.

== Plot ==
=== Part 1 ===
During a harsh winter, two sons of Kozlík, a robber clan leader, ambush a group traveling to Mladá Boleslav. They kidnap a young nobleman, Kristian, who has been chosen to become the Bishop of Hennau, but Kristian's father, a count and ally of the Bohemian king, escapes. Mikoláš, one of Kozlík's sons, finds a neighboring clan leader, Lazar, scavenging the site of the ambush. When Mikoláš makes him kneel and pray, Lazar becomes transfixed by a holy vision of his virginal daughter, Marketa, as a nun, and Mikoláš spares his life. At their settlement, named Roháček, Kozlík chastises Mikoláš for bringing captives and sparing Lazar. His anger increases when the other son, Adam, reveals that the nobleman's father escaped, raising the possibility that the king's soldiers might come to Roháček. As a result, Kozlík reverses his order to kill Kristian. Meanwhile, Kozlík's daughter, Alexandra, takes a liking to Kristian, much to the dismay of Kozlík's son, Adam.

Kozlík goes to the king's captain in Boleslav, saying he has come in good faith to talk, but the captain tells him it is too late and that the king has given him orders to imprison Kozlík. Kozlík stabs the captain at the prison door, manages to escape, and returns to Roháček. Anticipating an attack by the captain, the clan retreats to a remote fortification. Mikoláš visits Lazar, urging him to help Kozlík ambush the regiment. Marketa is shocked to see Mikoláš brutally beaten and driven out. A small group sent by Kozlík to avenge the beating finds the regiment already at Lazar's settlement. They kill the captain's closest knight and retreat, and the captain swears justice and revenge.

Lazar and Marketa visit the convent and make arrangements to enroll her at winter's end. Returning to their settlement, they find it captured by Mikoláš and his men, who kill Lazar's mentally disabled son. As Lazar begs for his life, Mikoláš demands Marketa in exchange. He protests, but they nail him to the gate and take Marketa. At their forest stronghold, Mikoláš rapes Marketa but then protects her from Kozlík's wrath. Meanwhile, Kristian has impregnated Alexandra. Kozlík chains both couples on a nearby hill.

=== Part 2 ===
Bernard, a wandering priest, happens upon Lazar's settlement, where the captain's soldiers knock him out and steal his sheep. After traveling away from the settlement, the soldiers are killed and robbed by Adam and an accomplice, but the captain and additional soldiers arrive and take Adam captive. Kristian's father demands Adam be killed, but the captain forces Adam to lead them to Kozlik. In a flashback we learn that Alexandra and Adam previously engaged in incest, during which he was bitten by a venomous snake on the arm. Kozlik chopped off Adam's arm to give him a chance to survive but otherwise left the siblings' fate to the gods, telling Alexandra that if he died she would be killed. In the present, Bernard wanders to Kozlik's fortification, where he eats his own sheep for a meal, learning this only afterward. When the captain's regiment arrives at the stronghold with Adam, Kozlík allows Mikolas to join the others back inside.

In an initial rash attack, the captain is repulsed but Adam dies. He then mounts a successful second attack. Kristian sees Alexandra chased by the attackers and is torn between loyalty to his father and love for her. He stumbles away beaten while a dream-like flashback shows him explaining his love for Alexandra and their future child to his dismayed father. Kristian reaches Roháček calling out for Alexandra, finds the settlement partially burned down and abandoned with the exception for Bernard, and wanders away. Meanwhile, Alexandra, Mikoláš, and Marketa have escaped the captain, who has taken Kozlík captive to Boleslav. Alexandra finds Kristian crawling through the woods and kills him. Kristian's father eventually finds her and demands to know where his body is buried, and finally she is arrested.

Marketa returns to Lazar, who survived, but he rejects her. In a trance-like state, she travels to the nunnery and begins to take her vows just as Mikoláš attempts to free Kozlík from the Boleslav dungeon. A child finds her and takes her arm. She leaves the ceremony to find Mikoláš dying in the castle courtyard from wounds suffered in the attempt. The captain marries Mikoláš and Marketa on the spot, and Mikoláš dies immediately afterward. Kozlík and Alexandra are present for the marriage, and then he is led toward his execution and she is taken to the prison. Brother Bernard finds Marketa in the wilderness and offers to travel with her in search of a new life. In the final scene, Marketa wanders on as the narrator reveals that she and Alexandra each had a son and that Marketa breastfed both boys.

== Cast ==
- Josef Kemr as Kozlík, a bandit yeoman who resides at Roháček. Lazar's rival.
- František Velecký as Mikoláš, Kozlík's second born son
- Ivan Palúch as Adam-Jednoručka, Kozlík's son
- Pavla Polášková as Alexandra, Kozlík's daughter
- Michal Kožuch as Lazar, a bandit yeoman. Kozlík's rival.
- Magda Vášáryová as Marketa Lazarová, Lazar's daughter
- Harry Studt as Kristián, Saxon Count whose son is abducted by Kozlík's sons
- Vlastimil Harapes as Kristián, son of a Saxon noble who is taken prisoner by Kozlík's clan
- Zdeněk Kryzánek as Captain Pivo, the leader of the royal army
- Zdeněk Řehoř as Sovička, Pivo's second in command
- Naďa Hejná as Kateřina, Kozlík's wife.
- Vladimír Menšík as Bernard, a wandering monk
- Karla Chadimová as the Abbess
- Jaroslav Moučka as Jan, Kozlík's first born son
- Pavel Landovský as Smil, Kozlík's son.
- Zdeněk Štěpánek as Narrator (voice)
- Petr Kostka as Mikoláš (voice)
- Ladislav Trojan as Adam-Jednoručka (voice)
- Karolina Slunéčková as Alexandra, Kozlík's daughter (voice)
- Martin Růžek as Lazar (voice)
- Gabriela Vránová as Marketa Lazarová (voice)
- Klaus-Peter Thiele as Kristián (voice)
- Antonie Hegerlíková as Kateřina (voice)

== Themes ==
The film is set in medieval Bohemia at a time when Christianity had not fully replaced Paganism. Conflict between Christianity and Paganism, mirroring a conflict between the clans and central authority, is a major theme. The Kozlík clan leans toward Paganism while the royal regiment represent Christianity and authority. Meanwhile, Lazar's clan is nominally Christian but politically neutral. Kozlík wants Lazar to support him in the fight but Lazar refuses and sides with the king, leading to the abduction of his daughter.

Similarly, the romance between Markéta and Mikoláš, who rapes her but later protects and loves her, represents a meeting of purity and innocence with worldly violence. The film highlights Mikoláš's ferocity and unrestrainment. This interplays with the romance between Mikoláš's sister Alexandra and Kristián, in which the roles are reversed. Kristián's love for Alexandra contradicts Mikoláš's love for Marketa; he is uncertain in it due to his loyalty to his father.

Royal scenes that were cut from the film were supposed to show contradictions between the Kozlík clan and the royal family. Their difference was to be shown in a struggle for property and power. Desire for the crown leads to hatred between brothers and of sons towards their father, common in big royal families but not in small families. The film also shows conflict between Mikoláš and Adam. Neither is the oldest son but they are both likely candidates to replace Kozlík as clan leader.

== Production ==
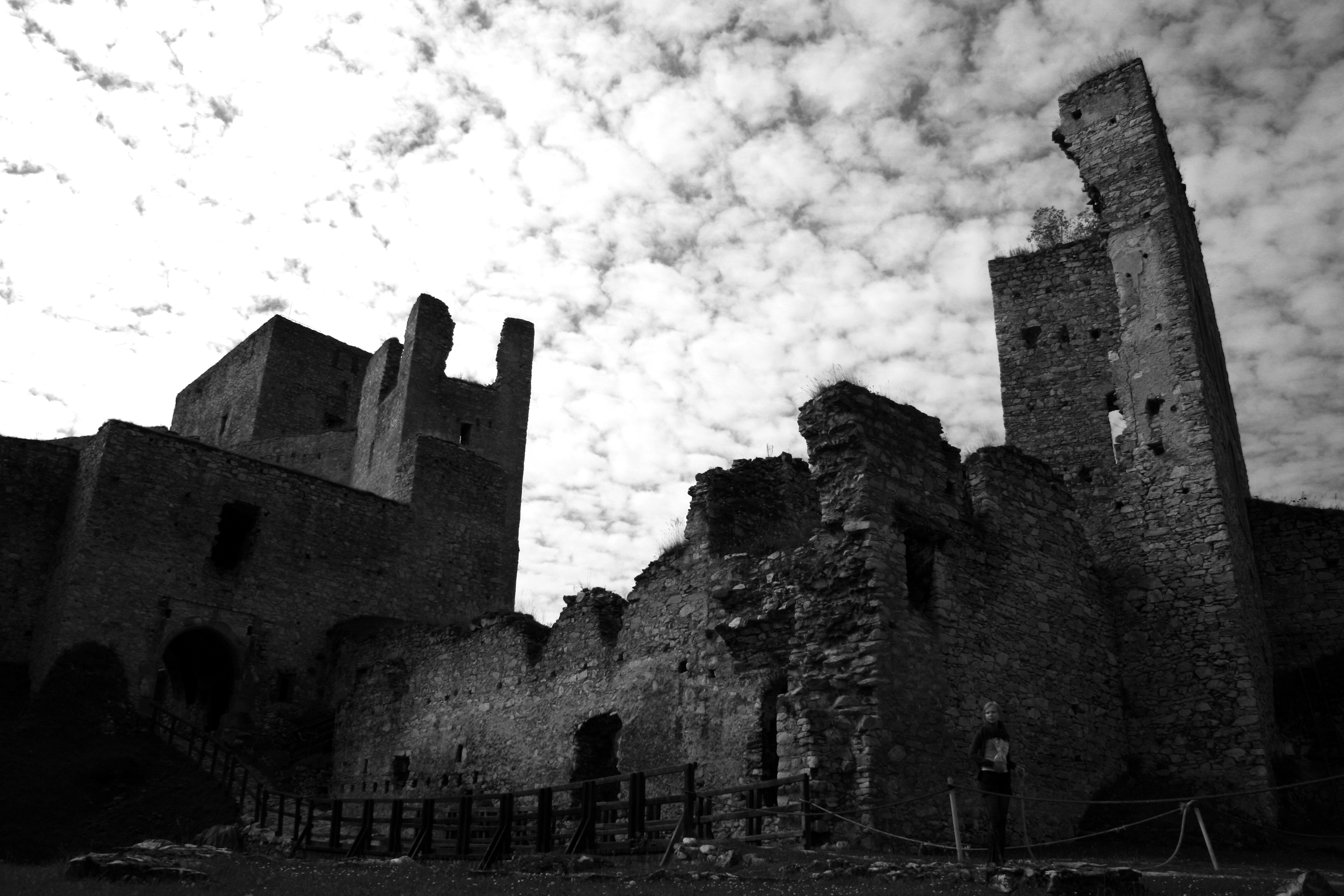
Rabí Castle represented Medieval Boleslav.

Before production started, František Vláčil and František Pavlíček had to transfer the novel into screenplay. The text of the book was linguistically difficult and the transfer took a few years. The whole works on Marketa Lazarová took seven years.

Production itself took three years. The shooting started in 1964 and concluded in 1966. It took 548 days. The film was shot at multiple places in the current Czech Republic such as Lánská obora, Mrtvý luh and Klokočín Castle. Shooting took place during extreme conditions of tough winter. The intended budget was 7 million crowns but the film cost almost 13 million crowns in the end. The expensiveness of the film was one of the reasons for making The Valley of the Bees in which Vláčil used costumes and decorations intended for Marketa Lazarová. The film was finished in 1967. Some parts were shot in Slovakia.

=== Royal Pictures ===
The film was originally intended to be longer. Vláčil wanted to make scenes named "Royal Pictures". These were supposed to be set at the royal court. These would feature the Czech king Wenceslaus I of Bohemia and the conflict between him and his son Ottokar II of Bohemia. These scenes were never filmed because the budget was already too high and the film would be longer than three hours.

==== Plot ====
The first picture would show old Kristián coming to the Royal Court asking for help to save his son. Present nobles would blame the king for being passive in the matter. The second picture would be set two years prior to the events. It would show the prince being convinced to overthrow his father. The prince would then start remembering when his father returned from a hunt injured and met his sons. The prince was afraid of him. Another picture would be set in the aftermath of the film's events. Pivo brings old Kristián and Alexandra to the king. Alexandra is to be punished for murdering young Kristián but old Kristián asks to pardon her because of her pregnancy. The king orders the prince to be brought to the court. The prince was imprisoned after his attempt to overthrow the king. Pivo starts remembering events of the military campaign against Kozlík. The king unsuccessfully tries to humiliate his son; the question of pardon for Alexandra becomes a secondary matter as the conflict between king and prince becomes a conflict about conception of rule. The king leaves the decision about pardon to Alexandra to Kristián.

== Soundtrack ==
The music for Marketa Lazarová was composed by Zdeněk Liška. It is based on medieval composition. There are motifs of Gregorian chant. The music emphasizes the conflict between the Christian and the Pagan world. The soundtrack was released in 1996 as part of edition by publishers Zóna and Bonton Music.

In 2015, Petr Ostrouch was permitted by Liška's descendants to make a concert of music from Marketa Lazarová. It was held on 9 October 2015 at Karlín. It was part of the musical festival Struny podzimu and a recording was released as a double album in 2018.

== Differences between the film and novel ==
Vladislav Vančura

The film is based on Vladislav Vančura's novel of the same name. The film isn't a faithful adaptation and there are many differences. The film includes some elements from Obrazy z dějin národa českého that weren't present in the Marketa Lazarová novel. The character of Monk Bernard and the unrealised Royal Pictures originate from Obrazy z dějin národa českého.

The novel wasn't a historically accurate capture of the age of setting. The film tries to be more historically accurate to the world of 13th century. It was visible in the Royal Pictures that was to be set at the Royal Court of Wenceslaus I of Bohemia.

Another major difference is that Alexandra's fate is left unresolved in the film. This was caused by the removal of the Royal Pictures that would include her trial at the royal court and suicide.

== Release ==
The film premiered on 24 November 1967 and was watched by 1.3 million people in theaters. However, it became inaccessible for a long period of time after it left Cinemas. When the film was screened at San Francisco Film Festival in 1968 the critics wrote "This is one of the most artistic and convincing medieval epics ever made, plunging us into the past with a relentless assault upon the visual senses with both dazzling and horrifying effects."

On 30 August 1974, Marketa Lazarová premiered in the United States. It was shortened to 100 minutes for the American market. Reviews for this version were mixed. The film's reputation was restored after the original version was made available in the United States in 2011.

The restored version returned to Czech cinemas on 13 October 2011. The premiere was presented by Magdaléna Vášáryová. Vašáryová stated that she was moved by the number of young people who expressed interest in the film.

=== Video release ===
In 2009, Bontonfilm announced it will release Marketa Lazarová for DVD and Blu-ray. Bontonfilm didn't have enough finances for restoration and thus cancelled the plan. The situation changed in 2011, when the film was digitally restored by UPP. Restoration cost 2 million Czech crowns. It was financed by the Czech Ministry of Culture and Karlovy Vary International Film Festival. The digitalized version of the film premiered on 2 July 2011 at Karlovy Vary film festival. The film was released in the Czech Republic on DVD on 8 December 2011. The film was released worldwide on DVD and Blu-ray by the Criterion Collection in 2012.

== Reception ==
=== Critical reception ===
The film has received universal acclaim from critics. On the review aggregator website Rotten Tomatoes, 100% of 13 critics' reviews are positive, with an average rating of 9.4/10. In 1968, the magazine Film a doba held a survey of film critics to choose the best Czechoslovak film of 1967. Marketa Lazarová won the survey and received 344 votes, beating films such as The Firemen's Ball and Daisies. It also received more votes than any film from foreign films category. During Karlovy Vary International Film Festival in 1994 Marketa Lazarová was voted the best Czech film ever made. The film was also voted the greatest Czech film of all time in a national critics' poll. Marketa Lazarová also won several awards. It was awarded at Mar del Plata International Film Festival and Edinburgh International Film Festival.

=== Public reception ===
The film was also successful with audiences. It was attended by more than 1 million people in Czechoslovak cinemas. Marketa Lazarová was voted best Czech film of 1965–1967 period with 28% of votes in a survey by Týden.cz. The film also placed 5th in a Public survey by Media Desk.

=== Accolades ===
Date of ceremony	Event	Category	Recipient(s)	Result	Ref(s)
1965	Artistic competition at 20th anniversary of Liberation of Czechoslovakia	Writing	František Vláčil, František Pavlíček	Won	
1967	Trilobit Award	Best Director	František Vláčil	Won	
1967	Trilobit Award	Design Production	Oldřich Okáč	Won	
1967	V. Competition for the best musical work for film and television	Main Award	Zdeněk Liška	Won	
1967	XVIII. Worker's Film Festival	Cheb Jury Award		Won	
1967	XVIII. Worker's Film Festival	Litvínov Jury Award		Won	
1967	XVIII. Worker's Film Festival	Opava Jury Award		Won	
1967	XVIII. Worker's Film Festival	Pardubice Audience Award		Won	
1968	Mar del Plata International Film Festival	Best Film	František Vláčil	Nominated	
1968	Mar del Plata International Film Festival	Little Condor for artistic and historical values	František Vláčil	Won	
1968	Minister of Culture Award	Lyrical and artistically inventive work	František Vláčil	Won	
1968	Klement Gottwald State Award	Writing and realisation	František Vláčil, František Pavlíček	Won	
1968	Financial award for evaluation of Barandov Studio	The most successful film	František Vláčil	Won	
1968	Competition of Music Made for Film created in 1967	Main Award	Zdeněk Liška	Won	
1968	Edinburgh International Film Festival	Honourable Diploma		Won	
1992	Karlovy Vary International Film Festival	Crystal Globe	František Vláčil	Nominated	
1994	Karlovy Vary International Film Festival	Film critics poll of Best Czech film ever made		Won	
1998	Survey of Czech and Slovak film critics	Best Czech-Slovak film ever made		Won	

== Legacy ==
Marketa Lazarová is widely considered the best Czech film ever made and the best film directed by František Vláčil. It is also considered one of the best historical films of all time. The film was already critically acclaimed in 1967 and received many positive reviews and won a survey for the best film. Vláčil himself wasn't satisfied with the film and stated that he expected more. The reason for his dissatisfaction was the failure to realise Royal Pictures as he believed that it was a pivotal part of the film.

There was a survey of journalists during the 1994 Karlovy Vary International Film Festival to choose the best Czech film ever made. Marketa Lazarová won the survey. Another poll was held in 1998. 55 Czech and Slovak film critics and publicists voted Marketa Lazarová the Best Czech-Slovak film of all time. Marketa Lazarová also topped a 2007 survey of Reflex magazine publicists. Týden.cz held surveys to choose the best Czech film of every epoch. Marketa Lazarová was voted the best Czech film of the 1965–1967 period.

Casablanca Publisher released the book Marketa Lazarová: Studies and Documents in 2009. It is a study of the film edited by Petr Gajdošík. It consists of various studies, interviews and articles about the film.

== Other adaptations ==
The novel was adapted into a play in 2013. It premiered on 16 November 2013 at ABC Theatre. Dramaturgist Věra Mašková stated that the play focuses on emotions and theatrical poetry. The play was directed by Pavel Khek, and it starred Veronika Khek Kubařová as Marketa and Tomáš Novotný as Mikoláš. Tomáš Šťástka gave the play 60% in his review for iDnes.cz. He stated that it tries to focus on wider audience and retain medieval brutality. He praised that it managed to show the lyrical side of the novel, but noted that the medieval reality of the novel is in clear contrast with a theatrical environment.

== See also ==
- The Devil's Trap
- List of films considered the best
- List of Czech films considered the best
- List of films with a 100% rating on Rotten Tomatoes
- The Valley of the Bees
