= Karel Nový (writer) =

Czech publicist and bookwriter (1890–1980)

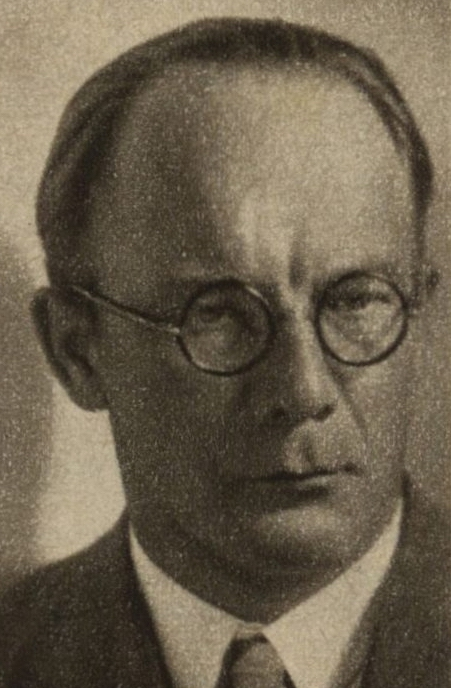
- Nový in 1940
- Born: 8 December 1890; Benešov, Bohemia, Austria-Hungary
- Died: 23 November 1980 (aged 89); Prague, Czechoslovakia
- Writing career
- Notable awards: National Artist
- Literary movement: Socialist realism

Karel Novák (8 December 1890 – 23 November 1980), known professionally as Karel Nový, was a Czech writer and journalist.

== Biography ==
Karel Novák was born into the family of a poor baker. He published under the name Karel Nový and later adopted this name as his own. He studied at the grammar school in Benešov and his classmate in the third and fourth years was Vladislav Vančura with whom he became close friends.

Nový did not finish high school and, after several short-term jobs, began to study journalism. As a journalist, he worked with left-wing intelligentsia. During World War II, he was arrested in 1944 by the Nazi occupiers and interned in the Klecina labor camp (Klettendorf) in Silesia near Wrocław.

After the liberation, he worked gradually in several newsrooms, from 1952 to 1956 he was the editor-in-chief of the State Children's Book Publishing House. From 1956 he worked as a professional writer. In 1960 he was appointed National Artist.

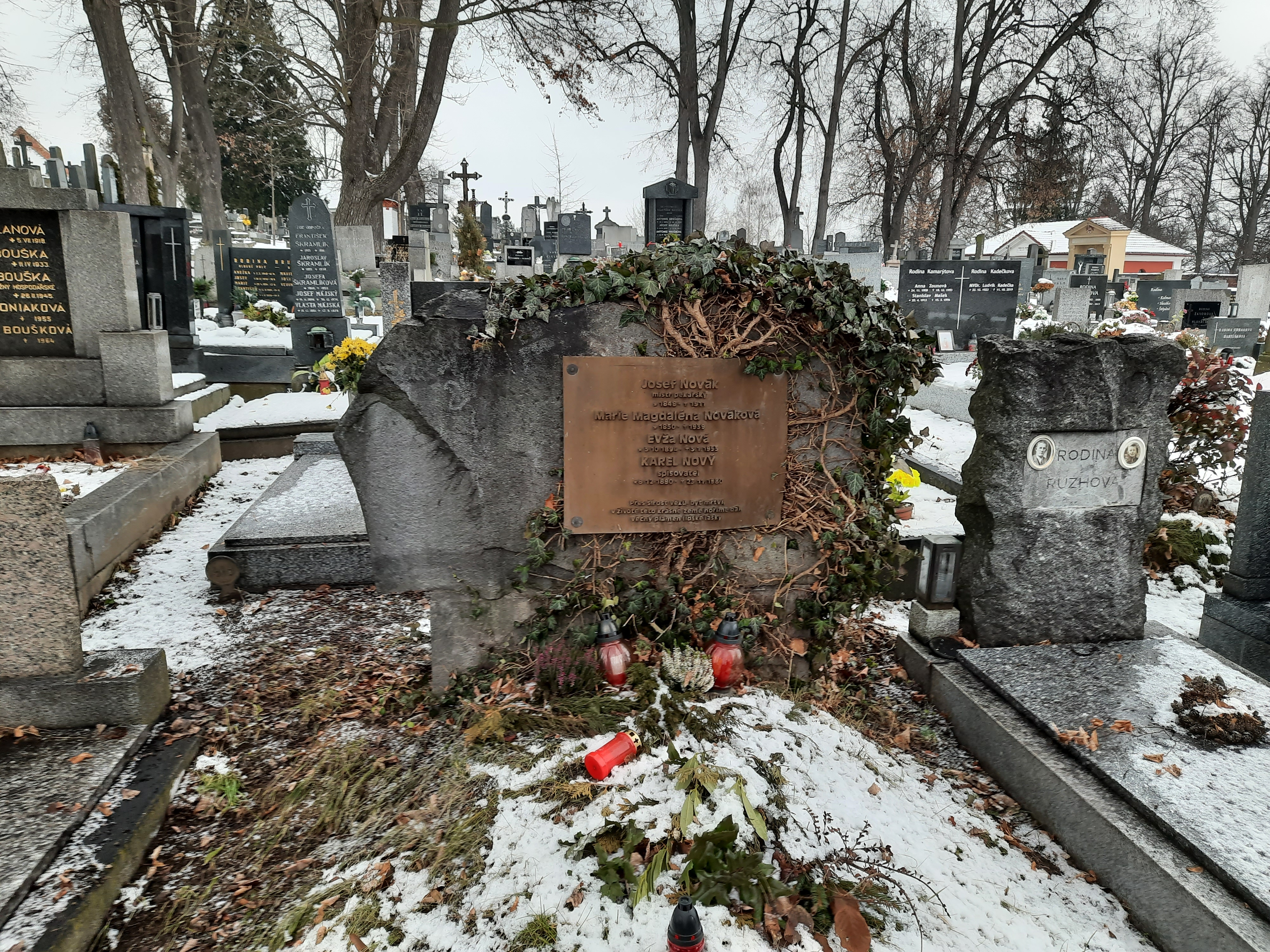
Grave of Karel Nový and his family at the Old Town Cemetery in Benešov

Karel Nový died in 1980 in Prague and was buried in the Old Town Cemetery in Benešov. The grave of the Karel Nový family in the Old Town Cemetery in Benešov.

== Works ==
The literary work of Karel Nový covers many genres: from feuilletons and short stories to long novels, from books for children and youth to theatrical plays and film scripts. His work is often classified as critical realism, he often dealt with social issues.

- Městečko Raňkov – 1927
- Železný kruh (trilogy):
  - Samota Křešín – 1927
  - Srdce ve vichru – 1930
  - Tváří v tvář – 1933
- Peníze – 1931
- Chceme žít – 1933
- Atentát –Rytíři a lapkové (nejprve pod názvem Železo železem se ostří) 1940
- Balada o českém vojáku 1945, román.
- Česká bouře – 1948
- Plamen a vítr: z letopisů městečka Raňkova – 1959
- Zaváté stopy – 1955
- Zahořklé úsměvy – 1959

=== Children's literature ===
- Rybaříci na modré zátoce – 1936
- Potulný lovec: román z lišákova života – 1941
- Nehasnoucí ohně: povídky ze starých dob – 1951
- Básníkova první láska – 1962

== Awards ==
- Order of Labor
- Klement Gottwald State Prize (1960)
- Honored Artist of Czechoslovakia (1954)
- National Artist of Czechoslovakia (1960)
