= Martha and I =

- U.S. theatrical release poster
- Original title: Marta a já
- Directed by: Jiří Weiss
- Cinematography: Viktor Růžička
- Music by: Jiří Stivín
- Release date: 1990
- Countries: Czechoslovakia; West Germany
- Language: Czech

Martha and I (Czech: Marta a já, German: Martha und ich) is a 1990 Czechoslovak-West German drama film directed by Jiří Weiss. It was entered into the main competition at the 47th Venice International Film Festival.

== Cast ==
- Marianne Sägebrecht as Marta
- Michel Piccoli as Dr. Arnošt Fuchs
- Václav Chalupa as Emil
- Ondřej Vetchý as Old Emil
- Klaus Grünberg as Bertl
- Michael Kausch as Werner
- Božidara Turzonovová as Róza Kluge
- Vladimír Brabec as Father Kluge
- Jana Březinová as Ida
- Soňa Valentová as Elsa
- Jana Altmannová as Kamila
- Zuzana Kocúriková as Ilona
- Jiří Menzel as Dr. Benda
