= Marketa Lazarová (novel) =

1931 novel by Vladislav Vančura

Markéta Lazarová
- Author: Vladislav Vančura
- Original title: Margareta Lazarová
- Language: Czech
- Genre: Modernist novel Historical novel
- Publisher: Sfinx – Bohumil Janda
- Publication date: 1931
- Publication place: Czechoslovakia
- English publication date: 2016, Twisted Spoon Press
- Media type: Print (Hardcover)
- Pages: 253 (first edition)
- Awards: Czechoslovak State Award for Literature (1931)

Marketa Lazarová is a Czech novel, written by Vladislav Vančura. It was first published in 1931. The novel was adapted into the acclaimed 1967 film Marketa Lazarová.

== Characters ==
- Kozlík – Cruel robber baron
- Lazar – Robber baron, enemy of Kozlík
- Mikoláš – Kozlík's son, who kidnaps Markéta
- Markéta – Lazar's daughter
- Christian – Son of the lord from Saxony, who's kidnapped by Kozlík's clan
- Alexandra – Kozlík's daughter, who falls in love with Christian
- Beer – Hetman of the Royal army

== Reception ==
The book was well-received by critics. It was awarded Czechoslovak State Award for Literature in 1931. Roman Jakobson wrote in his review "The novel's style, somewhat romantically tinted, again and again surprises with amazing simplicity, density and liveliness." Some critics, like Václav Renč, thought that parts where Vančura broke the Fourth wall were intrusive. Others, like A. M. Píša, praised these elements. Milan Kundera wrote about the novel: "In a certain sense the novel is a milestone in Vančura's evolution. Just as scattered rays converge in a single golden strand in the lens of a magnifying glass, in Marketa Lazarová Vančura's creative endeavors converge in a single, undivided stream."

== Adaptations ==
The movie adaptation Marketa Lazarová was released in 1967. The film was directed by František Vláčil. Several stage adaptation were produced in Czech theatres starting in 1976. From 2002 to 2004 a version directed by Jan Antonín Pitínský with music by Vladimír Franz ran in National Theatre in Prague.

== English translations ==
- Vančura, Vladislav (2016). Marketa Lazarová. Translated by Bulkin, Carleton. Prague: Twisted Spoon Press. ISBN 9788086264431.
