= Capricious Summer =

1968 film by Jiří Menzel

- DVD cover
- Directed by: Jiří Menzel
- Screenplay by: Vladimír Kalina; Jan Libora; Jiří Menzel; Václav Nývlt
- Based on: Rozmarné léto 1926 novel by Vladislav Vančura
- Starring: Rudolf Hrušínský; Vlastimil Brodský; František Řehák
- Cinematography: Jaromír Šofr
- Edited by: Jiřina Lukešová
- Music by: Jirí Šust
- Distributed by: Ústřední půjčovna filmů
- Release date: 24 May 1968
- Running time: 74 minutes
- Country: Czechoslovakia
- Language: Czech

Capricious Summer (Czech: Rozmarné léto), a 1968 Czechoslovak comedy film, was the first colour film directed by Jiří Menzel. It is based on the novel Rozmarné léto (Summer of Caprice) by the Czech writer Vladislav Vančura. It was listed to compete at the 1968 Cannes Film Festival, but the festival was cancelled due to the events of May 1968 in France. The film won the Crystal Globe at 1968 Karlovy Vary International Film Festival.

The film depicts a humorous story of three men, a retired artillery major, a priest and a bath-keeper, during rainy summer days.

== Plot ==
At an abandoned swimming resort, three middle-aged men—Antonín Dura, a bathhouse owner; Major Hugo, a retired artillery major; and Canon Roch, the local abbé—have a bickering conversation. Arnoštek, a touring tightrope walker, arrives and invites them to his circus act. Later that night, they attend Arnoštek's performance in the town square. There, all men meet Arnoštek's assistant Anna. After the performance, Antonín rescues Anna from the river. He seduces her, and the two sleep together until they are caught by Antonín's wife Kateřina at sunrise. Infuriated by his infidelity, Kateřina leaves and moves in with Arnoštek.

That same night, Canon Roch dines with Anna in her caravan as Antonín looks on from the outside. However, they are interrupted by a mob of village men, who pull Roch out of the caravan and assault him. The next morning, Roch has suffered a torn ear, to which Major Hugo and Antonín meet with him and stitch his ear. For the third night, Hugo and Antonín revisit the circus to see Anna again. During the act, an old man warns Arnoštek, who then falls off the wire and lands on his back, injuring himself. Anna then performs an elegant dance. Afterwards, Hugo dines with Anna in his caravan. Smitten with her, he forces himself on her and falls asleep in her lap. Meanwhile, Arnoštek, now bored with Kateřina's advances, sends her back to Antonín. She and Antonín amend their relationship.

By the following morning, Arnoštek searches for Anna, and strikes Hugo with a baton. All three men return to the resort where they notice Arnoštek's caravan leaving town and resume their summer days.

== Cast ==
- Rudolf Hrušínský as Antonín Dura
- Vlastimil Brodský as Major Hugo
- František Řehák as Canon Roch
- Míla Myslíková as Kateřina Durová
- Jana Preissová as Anna (as Jana Drchalová)
- Jiří Menzel as Arnoštek, the tightrope walker
- Bohuš Záhorský as old man
- Vlasta Jelínková as housemaid (as V. Jelínková)
- Alois Vachek as man in a pub (as A. Vachek)
- Bohumil Koska as man in a pub (as B. Koska)
- Karel Hovorka as man in a pub (as K. Hovorka)
- Antonín Pražák as policeman (as A. Prazak)
- Pavel Bosek as Mayor (as P. Bosek)

== Reception ==
On the review aggregator website Rotten Tomatoes, 71% of 7 critics' reviews are positive.
