= Vladislav Vančura =

Czech writer

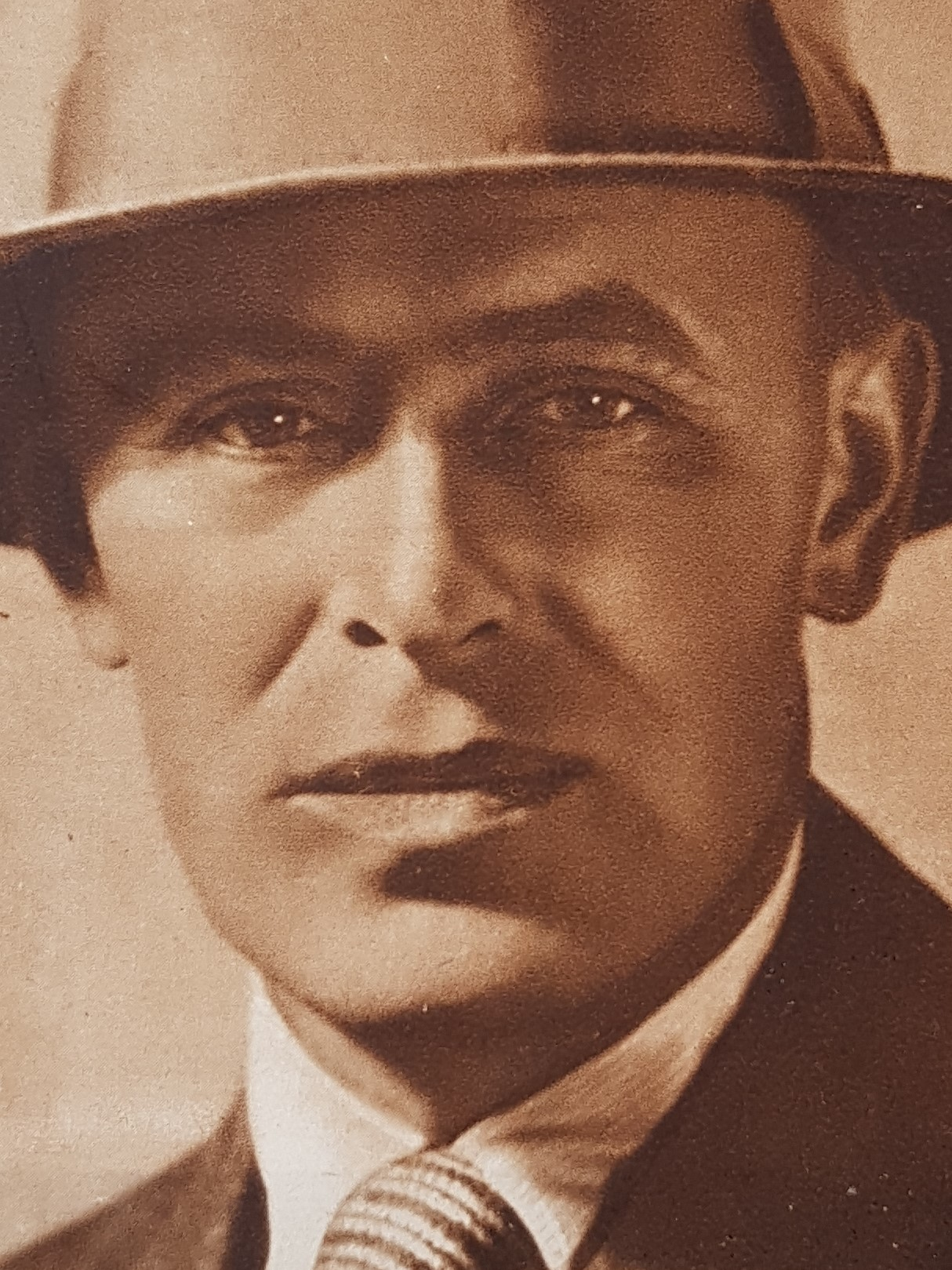
- Vladislav Vančura
- Born: 23 June 1891; Háj ve Slezsku, Austria-Hungary
- Died: 1 June 1942 (aged 50); Prague, Protectorate Bohemia and Moravia
- Occupation: Writer
- Writing career
- Notable works: Rozmarné léto Marketa Lazarová; Obrazy z dějin národa českého

Vladislav Vančura (Czech: [ˈvlaɟɪslaf ˈvantʃura]; 23 June 1891 – 1 June 1942) was a Czech writer. He was also active as a film director, playwright and screenwriter. A member of the Czech resistance during WWII, he was captured and executed by the Nazis.

== Early years ==
Vančura was born on 23 June 1891 in Háj ve Slezsku in Austrian Silesia (today the Czech Republic). He was a descendant of an old noble Vančura of Řehnice family. His father Václav Vojtěch Vančura, born 1856 in Čáslav, was a Protestant and worked as an administrator of sugar refinery. His mother, Marie Svobodová was Catholic, born 1863 in Kluky. In 1896, the family moved to Davle, where they lived in a large country house. His broadminded father became a director of a brick factory. In Davle, young Vladislav was educated by a tutor between 1898 and 1904. In 1905, he and his older sisters moved to Prague to study there; Vladislav entered the fifth class of Primary School in Josefská Street.

== First prose-works and teenage years ==
In 1907 Vladislav entered the Royal Gymnasium in Prague Malá Strana, but problems with school routine and pedantry of professors made him leave the next year. Between 1909 and 1910, he attended Royal Gymnasium in a small town of Benešov, about 30 miles south-east of Prague. It was an old school founded in 1704 and formerly led by the Piarist Order, with severe discipline and rigid professors. Vančura hated this school immensely; on 14 May 1909 he published his first short story V aleji ("In Alley") in the literary supplement of Horkého týdeník ("Horký's weekly magazine").

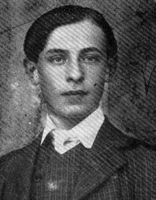
Vančura as a young man

The studies in Benešov ended in 1910 by a consilium abeundi because of his membership in a secret student club. His parents sent him to Vysoké Mýto to be an apprentice to a bookseller Čermák. He felt depressed and dreamed of becoming a painter. In 1911, he studied the technology of photography in Prague and also began courses at Arts and Crafts School; he was unsuccessful in his attempt to enter the Royal Academy of Arts and start a career as a painter. He considered suicide because his parents wanted him to be a marine officer or soldier. Due to the illness of his mother, Vladislav returned to Davle. In 1912 he studied privately at home and completed the exams of 4th and 5th class of the gymnasium. The next year he entered Royal Gymnasium on Křemencová Street in Prague and finished the 6th class. Between 1914 and 1915 he was again a student at Prague Malá Strana Royal Gymnasium where he took the final exam on 6 June 1915.

== University studies, journalism ==
In October 1915, Vladislav entered the Faculty of Law of Charles University in Prague, but this bored him. In the winter of 1916, he studied medicine at the same university; his family moved from Davle to a country manor Humburky, not far from Prague and Vladislav met 19-year-old Ludmila 'Lída' Tuhá, a student of medicine. In 1917, the painter group Tvrdošíjní ("Stubborns") was founded by Josef Čapek, Jan Zrzavý, Václav Špála, Vlastimil Hofman, Bedřich Feuerstein, Zdeněk Rykr and other close friends of Vladislav. He wrote about them and Josef Čapek became the congenial illustrator of his later book Rozmarné léto in 1926. Between 1 October and 31 December 1918 Vladislav practiced medicine at a hospital in Německý Brod. A few days later, on 3 October, he published his small prose Ráj ("Paradise") in S. K. Neumann's magazine Červen ("June") and worked on a fairy-tale book Kolébka ("Cradle") and on a play Iason. In 1919 Vladislav returned to Prague to continue his university studies; from 1919–1920 he published many art reviews in daily newspaper České slovo ("The Czech Word").

== 1920s and great novels ==
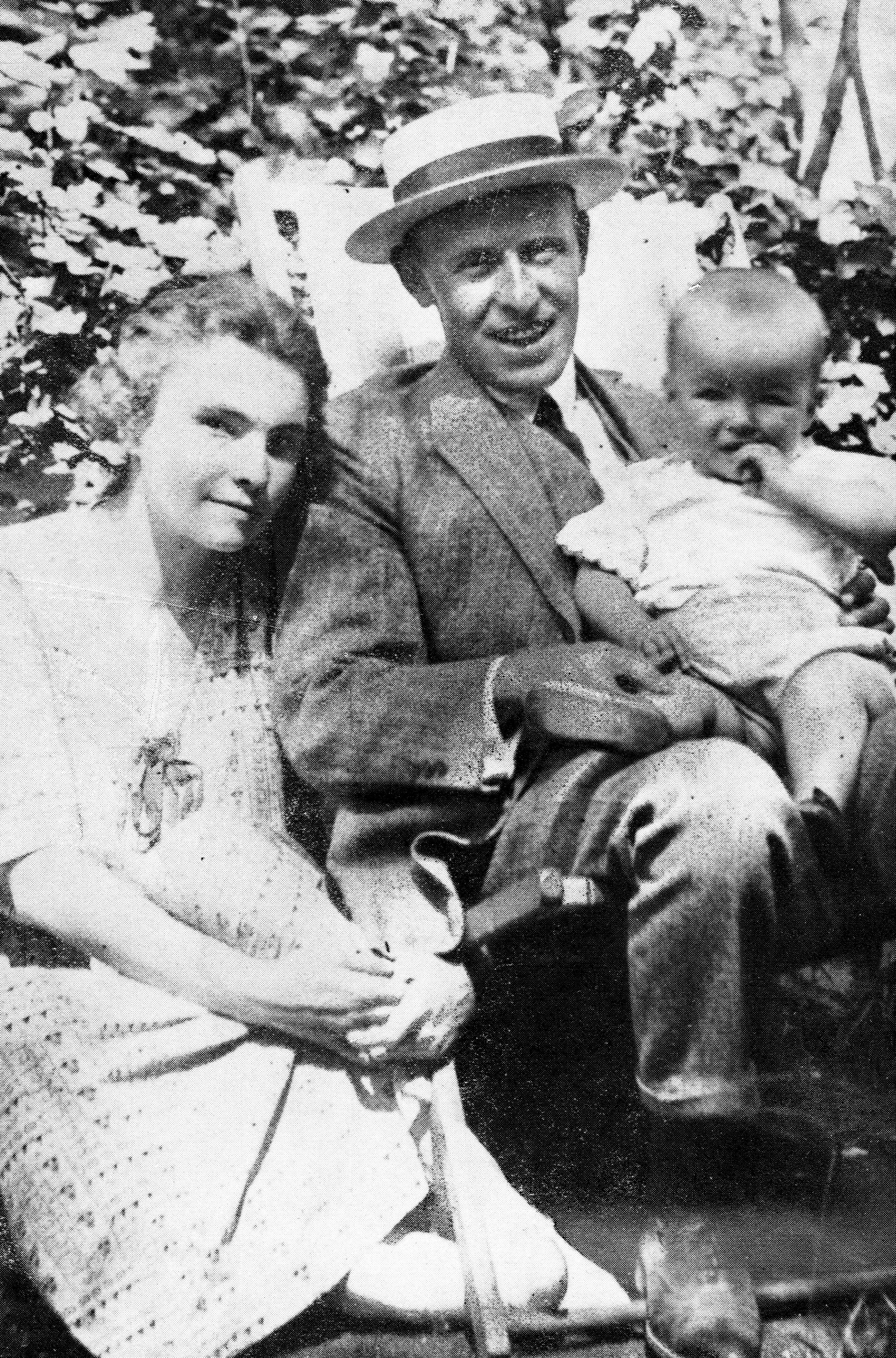
Vančura with his child and wife Ludmila, 1923

On 2 June 1921 Vladislav and Lída graduated as doctors of medicine and married on 16 August that year. In autumn, they moved to Zbraslav, where they opened a surgical practice. In 1923, Vladislav published a book of short stories Amazonský proud ("Amazon Stream"). More important was his second short stories book, published in 1924, Dlouhý, Široký a Bystrozraký ("Long, Thick and Sharpsighted"), containing excellent texts like Cesta do světa (Journey to the World) or F. C. Ball. The third book, Pekař Jan Marhoul ("Baker Jan Marhoul"), published in 1924, introduced him as a great author to the public. It is Vančura's first novel and maybe also his best - story of tragical life of a wealthy baker who is continuously declining into destitution and death despite his gentleness and goodness. The story is written with extraordinary language and a brilliant style. In 1925, Vančura published the novel Pole orná a válečná ("Fields of Plough, Fields of War") and the following year the novel Rozmarné léto ("Summer of Caprice"), became a bestseller. It is a humorous story of three men – a colonel, a priest and a bath-keeper – during rainy summer holidays. In 1967, the book was successfully filmed as Capricious Summer by the Czech director Jiří Menzel who also played the role of Arnoštek in this movie. In 1928 Vančura wrote his fourth novel, Poslední soud ("Last Judgement"), published in 1929 and built his new white functionalistic villa in Zbraslav designed by architect Jaromír Krejcar, the husband of Franz Kafka's friend, journalist and translator Milena Jesenská.

== 1930s and great novels ==
Vančura's fifth novel Hrdelní pře aneb Přísloví ("Criminal Dispute or The Proverbs") published in 1930 in Aventinum Publishing House, Prague, was not very popular in its time; it is the most complicated of Vančura's novels, the genre of which lies between a detective novel and a tract on noetic theory. From the language point of view this book is a serious problem for translators because of hundreds of old proverbs used in text; there is only one translation today - Polish. In 1931, the novel Markéta Lazarová was published and became a bestseller. The novel was inspired by a true Middle Ages story of the knights of the Vančura family who were in a private war with other noblemen and with the King's town Mladá Boleslav. Vančura dedicated this book to his cousin and friend Jiří Mahen. In 1967, the book was successfully filmed by director František Vláčil. In the same year (1931) Vančura also published a fairy-tale book Kubula a Kuba Kubikula (Kubula and Kuba Kubikula) that remained popular for decades. Vančura's activity continued through the next year as he published the novel Útěk do Budína ("Escape to Budapest"), a contemporary story of love, marriage and life of a Prague middle-class woman and a Slovak nobleman. In 1934, two other books were published: Luk královny Dorotky ("Bow of Little Queen Dorothy"), a collection of short stories and Konec starých časů ("End of the Old Times") a bestseller, satirical and humorous novel about the life at a Bohemian country-chateau in the first years of the republic (this book was also successfully filmed by Jiří Menzel in 1989). In 1934 also, Vančura directed the film Marika Nevěrnice, from a story by Karel Nový and Ivan Olbracht. With the 'End of the Old Times', the time of Vančura's best books ended too. His next two books, a play Jezero Ukerewe ("Ukerewe Lake") from 1935 and a socialism-influenced book Tři řeky ("Three Rivers"), 1936 were not successful.

== 1940s, political crisis and war ==
In March 1938, Adolf Hitler annexed Austria. Vančura's friend, playwright Otokar Fischer died of a heart-attack when he learned about it; Vančura wrote an obituary about him to Literární listy magazine. In 1938, Rodina Horvátova ("Horvát Family"), a novel about life of three generations of a gentry family was published which did not attract any reader interest, due to the political crisis. In December 1938, Vančura took part in the burial of his friend Karel Čapek, the famous writer.

Vančura entered the strong anti-Hitler cultural movement and started to write the book Obrazy z dějin národa českého (Pictures of the History of the Bohemian Nation); its first parts were published and then became a bestseller and symbol of resistance. On 15 March 1939 the rest of Czechoslovakia was occupied by Hitler and a week later, on 22 May, Jiří Mahen committed suicide in a protest against Nazism.

Vančura was a member of the Communist Party of Czechoslovakia since its founding. He was expelled from the party in 1929 for signing the Manifesto of the Seven, nonetheless he continued to support the Communist Party. During the German occupation of Czechoslovakia, Vančura joined a secret communist resistance group in Autumn 1939. On 12 May 1942, at 5:00 a.m., the Gestapo assaulted his house in Zbraslav, arrested him and tortured him in the Prague Gestapo headquarters. On 27 May 1942 a commando of the Czechoslovak Foreign Army based in Britain assassinated Reinhard Heydrich, Hitler's governor in Prague. As a result, there was a wave of reprisals: in the following weeks more than 2000 members of the Czech elite were executed. One of them was Vančura, executed by SS members in the military area Prague-Kobylisy on 1 June 1942 at 6:45 p.m. His body together with many others was disposed of secretly at Strašnice Crematorium.

== Selected works ==
=== Novels ===
- Pekař Jan Marhoul (1924)
- Pole orná a válečná (1925), English Ploughshares into Swords. Prague: Karolinum Press (2021). ISBN 978-80-246-4814-9
- Rozmarné léto (1926), English Summer of Caprice. Prague: Karolinum Press (2006). ISBN 80-246-1195-3. 2nd edition: Prague: Karolinum Press (2016). ISBN 978-80-246-3289-6.
- Markéta Lazarová (1931)
- Obrazy z dějin národa českého (1939–1940)
- Kubula a Kuba Kubikula

=== Plays ===
- Alchymista (1932)
- Jezero Ukereve (1935)
- Josefína (1941)

== Filmography ==
=== Director ===
- On the Sunny Side (1933)
- Bursa práce (1933)
- Marijka nevěrnice (1934)
- Naši furianti (1937)
- Láska a lidé (1937)
