= František Velecký =

Slovak actor

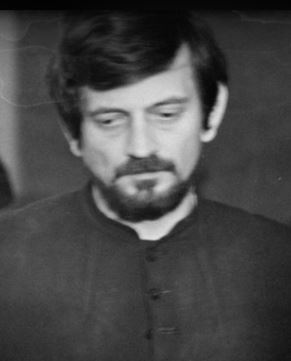
- František Velecký in 1969
- Born: 8 March 1934; Zvolen, Czechoslovakia
- Died: 5 October 2003 (aged 69); Bratislava, Slovakia
- Occupation: Actor
- Years active: 1960–2003

František Velecký (often credited as Fero Velecký, 8 March 1934 – 5 October 2003) was a Slovak actor.

Velecký was a very particular figure of Slovak acting, being antipode to venerated mainstream showbiz celebrities. Although he had never received any formal training (in acting) he managed to earn a great respect of both filmmakers and audience members. He performed in some 50 Slovak, Czech, German, Hungarian and UK/US movies, but he will be most remembered for portraying the lead character of Mikoláš in the Czech movie Marketa Lazarová.

== Biography and career ==
Velecký was born 8 March 1934 in Zvolen. He originally studied civil engineering (highschool) and worked as a designer for few years. However, since his early age he was attracted by the world of cinema and finally in his 30s managed to get his first major roles. Practically at the beginning of his acting career, after a few minor films including Každý týždeň sedem dní (1964) and Nylonový mesiac (1965), he received the role of his lifetime in Marketa Lazarová (1966). This experience deeply influenced the rest of his life. In interviews, he described with gratitude how the director František Vláčil completely changed his way of seeing the world during the long production of this movie. Despite the impact the role had on the film (widely considered the best Czech cinema) and on his life, Velecký would probably be more recognized by Western audiences for his appearances in The Brothers Grimm (released 2005) and the Academy Award-nominated Želary (2003). For most of his career, Velecký was free of any theatre company ties except being briefly associated with the Theatre of Spišká Nová Ves in the 1980s.

During his professional career, Velecký was not limited to acting. He was assistant director to Juraj Jakubisko on the film Zbehovia a pútnici (1968) and he applied his talent in fine arts during the 1990s.

Velecký died of cancer 5 October 2003 in Bratislava.

== Selected filmography ==
- Skalní v ofsajde (1960) – debut, uncredited
- Každý týždeň sedem dní (1964)
- Prípad pre obhajcu (1964)
- Nylonový mesiac (1965)
- Marketa Lazarová (1967)
- Stopy na Sitne (1968)
- Pražské noci (1968)
- Virágvasárnap (1969)
- Sladké hry minulého leta (1969) TV
- Noc s mačkou (1970)
- Princ Bajaja (1971)
- Red Psalm (Még kér a nép) (1972)
- Zločin v Modré hvězde (1973)
- Láska (1973)
- Szerelmem, Elektra (1974)
- Horúčka (1975)
- Pacho, hybský zbojník (1975)
- Na veliké řece (1976)
- Bludička (1977)
- Na konci diaľnice (1982)
- Na druhom brehu sloboda (1984)
- Iná láska (1985)
- O živej vode (1987)
- Let asfaltového holuba (1990)
- Lepšie je byť bohatý a zdravý ako chudobný a chorý (1992)
- Želary (2003)
- The Brothers Grimm (2005)

=== Notable TV appearances ===
- Rajský plyn (1970)
- Plamene (1972)
- Vrchárska balada (1973)
- Naši synovia (1974)
- Vivat Beňovský (1975)
- Smrť chodí po horách (1979)
- Na baňu klopajú (1980)
- Cukor (1982)
- Štúrovci (1991)
