= Ivan Palúch =

Slovak actor

- Born: 20 June 1940; Zvolen, Slovakia
- Died: 3 July 2015 (aged 75); Martin, Slovakia
- Occupation: Actor
- Years active: 1967–2015

Ivan Palúch (20 June 1940 – 3 July 2015) was a Slovak actor. He appeared in more than forty films from 1967 to 2015.

== Selected filmography ==
Year	Title	Role	Notes
1971	Princ Bajaja		
1969	Man on Horseback		
1968	It Rains in My Village	Triša	
1967	Marketa Lazarová		
