= Magdaléna Vášáryová =

Slovak actress and diplomat (born 1948)

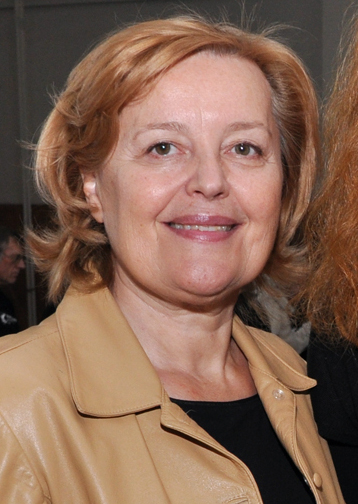
- Magdaléna Vášáryová (2011)
- Born: 26 August 1948 (age 78); Banská Štiavnica, Czechoslovakia (now Slovakia)
- Occupations: Actress, diplomat
- Years active: 1964–1990 (acting) 1990-present (diplomacy)
- Spouse: Milan Lasica (m. 1980)

Magdaléna Vášáryová (Slovak pronunciation: [ˈmaɡdaleːna ˈʋaːʂarjɔʋaː]; referred also as Magda Vášáryová [ˈmaɡda -]; born 26 August 1948) is a former Slovak actress and diplomat, prominent for her liberal anti-nationalist stances.

== Life ==
Vášáryová was born in 1948. In 1971, she completed her studies at Comenius University in Bratislava. Until 1989, she acted in several Slovak theatres - including the Slovak National Theatre - and in numerous movies. The same year - 1989 - she was asked by Vaclav Havel to serve as Vice President in the united-democratic Czechoslovakia, but declined. She served as ambassador of Czechoslovakia in Austria (1990-1993) and ambassador of Slovakia in Poland (2000-2005). She was one of the candidates in the 1999 presidential election, but did not advance to the second round of the election. From February 2005 to July 2006, she held the position of State Secretary of the Ministry of Foreign Affairs of Slovakia. In the 2006 parliamentary elections, she was elected to the National Council of the Slovak Republic for Slovak Democratic and Christian Union - Democratic Party.

She was considered for the role of Sophie in Sophie's Choice.

In 2016, Vášáryová was honored with the Hanno R. Ellenbogen Citizenship Award - given jointly by the Prague Society for International Cooperation and Global Panel Foundation - for her lifelong fight against communism and corruption.

The entrepreneur Michal Horáček stood to be President of the Czech republic. He announced his advisers on 9 February 2017 which included Vášáryová, nuclear expert Dana Drábová, and surgeon Pavel Pafko.

== Private life ==
In 1980, she married Milan Lasica a Slovak humorist, playwright and actor. They were married until his death of heart attack on July 18, 2021.

== Filmography ==
- Senzi mama (1964) (TV) .... Eva
- Marketa Lazarová (1967) .... Marketa Lazarová
- Zbehovia a pútnici (1968) .... Dominika - Dominika
- The Sweet Time of Kalimagdora (1968) .... Kalimagdora
- Kráľovská poľovačka (1969) .... Marta za mlada
- Birds, Orphans and Fools (1969) .... Marta
- Na kometě (1970) .... Angelika
- Radúz a Mahulena (1970) (TV) .... Mahulena
- The Tricky Game of Love (1971) .... Náušnice - služka
- Princ Bajaja (1971) .... Slavěna
- Babička (1971) (TV) .... Hortensie
- And Give My Love to the Swallows (1972) .... Maruška
- Skrytý prameň (1974) .... Mária
- Deň slnovratu (1974) .... Blanka
- Rusalka (1977) .... Rusalka
- Krutá ľúbosť (1978) .... 2. - Kristka
- Pustý dvor (1978) .... Kristina
- Temné slunce (1980) .... Kris
- Zkrocení zlého muže (1981) .... Tereza
- Cutting It Short (1981) .... Maryška
- The Night of the Emerald Moon (1984) .... Slávka
- Tichá radosť (1985) .... Soňa
- Lev s bílou hřívou (1986) .... Calma Veselá
- Svět nic neví (1987) .... Jiřina
- Južná pošta (1987) .... Mária Jurkovičová
- Eugene Onegin (1988) .... Tatyana

== Family ==
- sister of actress Emília Vášáryová
- wife of comedian and writer Milan Lasica
