= Ivan Mistrík =

Slovak actor

- Born: 15 October 1935; Bratislava, Czechoslovakia
- Died: 8 June 1982 (aged 46); Bratislava, Czechoslovakia
- Occupation: Actor
- Years active: 1952–82

Ivan Mistrík (15 October 1935 – 8 June 1982) was a Slovak actor. He appeared in more than forty films from 1952 to 1982.

== Life and career ==
Ivan Mistrík was born in Bratislava on 15 October 1935. He began working professionally as a child actor at the Slovak National Theatre at the age of 11, and also performed regularly on the radio. As a teenager he was trained as an actor at the Bratislava Conservatory where he studied from 1949 through 1951. He was a member of the Dedinského Divadla theatre ensemble in 1951-1952, and then the J. G. Tajovský Theatre in Zvolen in 1952 to 1953. He performed as a member of the Bratislavské Nové Scény from 1953 to 1966. He was once again with the Slovak National Theatre in Bratislava from 1966 until his death in 1982.

Mistrík made his film debut at the age 15 in Kozie mlieko (1950). He appeared in more than 40 films, and was active as a film and television actor in Czechoslovakia until his death in 1982. His final film appearance was Tušenie (1982), and his final television credit, the television film Záchranná akcia (1983) came out after his death.

Mistrík's first wife was the actress Heleny Mistríkové (1932–1977) with whom he had three sons. After her death he married singer Mária Klesniaková. He died of suicide from a gun shot wound in Bratislava on 8 June 1982.

== Selected filmography ==
Year	Title	Role	Notes
1958	Luck Will Come on Sunday	Miško	
1960	Romeo, Juliet and Darkness	Pavel	
1960	Higher Principle		
1965	The House in Karp Lane	Milan Schramek	
1967	Vreckári	Zlatíčko	
1967	Zmluva s diablom	Peter	
1968	The Man Who Lies	Jean	
1968	Maratón	Sergeant Jakubisko	
1970	The Copper Tower		
1982	The Assistant		
