= Jiří Weiss =

Czech director and scriptwriter (1913–2004)

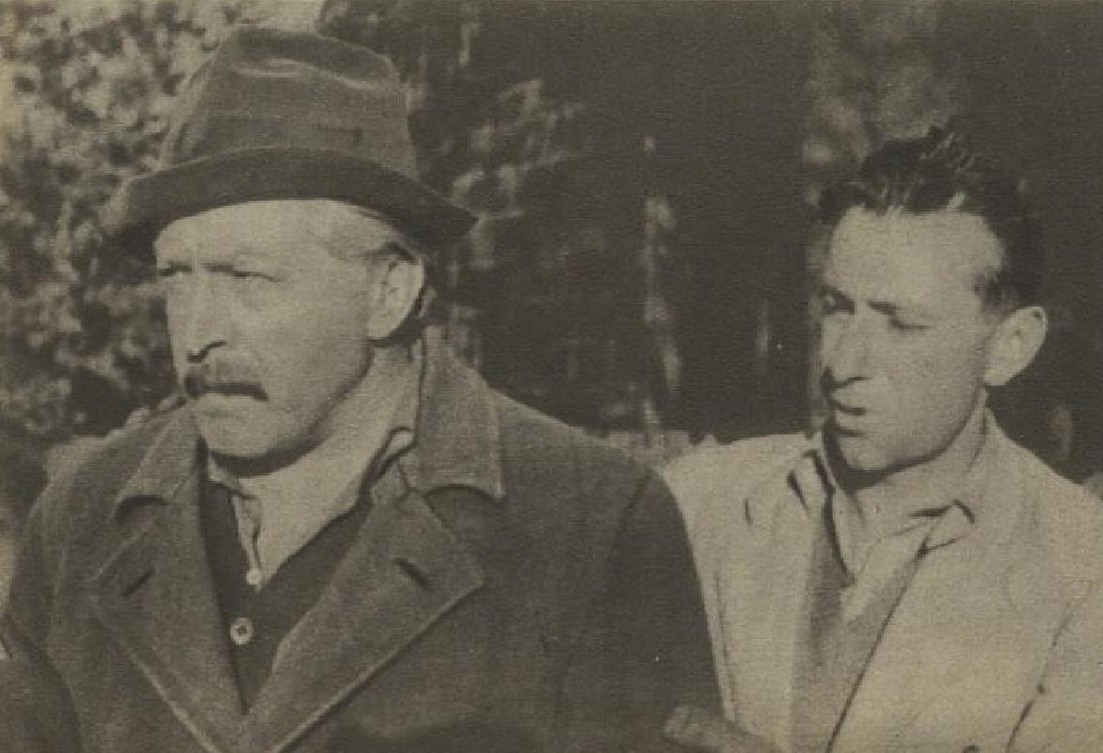
- Jiří Weiss (on the right) with L.H. Struna during the filming of The Stolen Frontier (1947)
- Born: 29 March 1913; Prague, Austria-Hungary
- Died: 9 April 2004 (aged 91); Santa Monica, California, U.S.
- Occupations: Film director; Screenwriter; Pedagogue
- Years active: 1935–1991
- Spouses: Martina Weissová (divorced) Daniela Smutná (divorced): Kateřina Mizerová

Jiří Weiss (29 March 1913 – 9 April 2004) was a Czech film director, screenwriter, writer, playwright and pedagogue.

== Life ==
=== Early life ===
Jiří Weiss was born to a wealthy Jewish family in Prague. His father was a Czech patriot and named his son after Czech king Jiří of Poděbrady. His parents were Emil Weiss (1880–1942) and Martha Weissová (née Fuchsová; 1882–1944). Emil Weiss owned a liqueur factory in Libeň district. Since his youth, Jiří was a staunch communist, which was at the heart of disputes with his capitalist parents. As a young boy he was friends with Franz Kafka's niece Marianne Pollaková and thanks to her he was able to read the books of then-unknown writer Kafka in the 1920s.

Weiss was interested in studying at film school, but his parents wished he studied law. While still a minor, he left his home and lived with his friend K. M. Walló. Weiss started to work as a copywriter in advertising. His father, who disagreed with his life choices and could still make decisions about his underage son, had him institutionalized in a mental hospital. Weiss never spoke to his father ever again. In his early twenties, he started working as a copywriter for the Prague branch of Metro-Goldwyn-Mayer. At this time, he wrote his first book – a story for children O věrné Hadimršce. He befriended leading intellectuals of the Left Front in Prague, including Vladislav Vančura and Ivan Olbracht. In 1934, Vančura invited him to be an assistant cinematographer on his movie Marijka the Faithless, based on Olbracht's book.

=== Filmmaking ===
Weiss was still determined to become a film director. He borrowed a 16mm camera from Jiří Lehovec and inspired by Soviet filmmakers he made his first amateur film about young people canoeing on Sázava River. Lehovec introduced Weiss to Alexandr Hackenschmied, who helped him edit the film at the Baťa film studios in Zlín. Weiss then sent the film to Venice Film Festival where it placed 5th best among 72 amateur movies in 1935. He was approached by Eastman Kodak Company and agreed to exchange the finished film for 900 metres of 35mm film stock. Once again, he borrowed a camera and made a new film with the same theme and the same actors called People in the Sun. He edited the film during nights using the equipment in MGM offices. The film was screened at Kotva cinema in Prague as part of the avant–garde program together with The Blood of a Poet or Un Chien Andalou. Weiss was praised by local critics and was awarded the 10,000 CSK from the Film department of Ministry of Commerce. In 1936, he was hired at A-B studio in Prague and as the first assignment he made his first professional film Sun Is Shining over Lužnice. Later that year, he directed a short documentary about aviation Give us the Wings (Video on YouTube). He then apprenticed with directors Martin Frič and Hugo Haas and continued to make short documentaries. His frequent collaborators were cameraman Václav Hanuš and composer Jiří Srnka. Weiss was in the middle of editing of the feature-length documentary for the 20 year anniversary of Czechoslovakia called Twenty Years of Freedom. After the Munich Agreement the film was canceled.

In 1939, after the occupation of Czechoslovakia, he fled to England with the film material and used the footage to make a documentary The Rape of Czechoslovakia with the help of Basil Wright, Paul Rotha and Louis MacNeice. Czech diplomat Jan Masaryk acquired the funding from his English friends. Weiss volunteered for the British Army and was assigned to make war documentaries for Crown Film Unit. He also worked with the Czechoslovak Government in exile. In 1942, he wrote a book Lost Government. On 13 March 1943, Weiss and Ota Ornest directed a MacNeice's play A Town without a Name at Royal Albert Hall as a part of the London Calling Prague event. In 1945, he flew with No. 311 Squadron RAF. He made a documentary about them called Night and Day. At the end of the war, he joined 21st Army Group as a front cameraman to film the liberation of France, Belgium and Netherlands. Weiss was present at the liberation of Buchenwald concentration camp. His footage was later used in Alain Resnais' film Night and Fog. He achieved the rank of captain in the British Army. Weiss refused the offer to join the US Army and become a combat cameraman in the Pacific War, because he wanted to go back to liberated Czechoslovakia.

He returned to Prague on 13 May 1945. All of his family, including his parents, were murdered in the Holocaust. He made his first full-length feature film The Stolen Frontier in 1947. Weiss, still a devoted communist at this time, turned away from politics during the communist persecutions in the early 1950s. He made his most celebrated movies in the late 1950s and 1960s, including Wolf Trap (1957), Romeo, Juliet and Darkness (1959) and Czechoslovak-British co-production Ninety Degrees in the Shade (1965).

After the Warsaw Pact invasion, Weiss left Czechoslovakia and lived in West Berlin, where he taught at a film school. Later he moved to the United States. There he taught film first at Hunter College in New York and later at UCSB. He became an American citizen in 1986. He still continued to write screenplays, but none of them were produced. During this time, he also wrote two plays – The Jewish War (1986) and Berenice (1990). In 1991, he managed to get funding and made his last film Martha and I. The film entered in competition at 47th Venice International Film Festival. In 1985, he met Alexander Payne, then a young film student, and became his lifelong friend and mentor. In 1995, Weiss wrote a book of memoirs Bílý Mercedes.

== Personal life ==
Weiss was married three times. He had two children with his first wife – a daughter Jiřina and a son Jiří. He died in Santa Monica in 2004 and is buried at New Jewish Cemetery in Prague.

== Selected filmography ==
=== Feature films ===
- The Stolen Frontier (1947)
- Dravci (1948)
- The Last Shot (1950)
- New Warriors Will Arise (1950)
- My Friend the Gipsy (1953)
- Doggy and the Four (1954)
- Life Is at Stake (1956)
- Wolf Trap (1957)
- Appassionata (1959)
- Romeo, Juliet and Darkness (1959)
- The Coward (1961)
- Golden Fern (1963)
- Ninety Degrees in the Shade (1965)
- Murder Czech Style (1967)
- Martha and I (1991)

=== Documentaries ===
- People in the Sun (1935)
- Sun Is Shining over Lužnice (1936)
- Give us the Wings (1936)
- Sea of Air (1937)
- A Song About Carpathian Ruthenia (1937)
- The Illusion Factory (1938)
- Journey from the Shadows (1938)
- The Rape of Czechoslovakia (1939) – Lyrical documentary about pre-WWII Czechoslovakia and Nazi invasion. Narrated by Cecil Day-Lewis.
- Secret Allies (1939)
- Eternal Prague (1940)
- Home Front (1941)
- 100 Million Women (1942)
- The Other RAF (1942)
- Fighter Pilot (1943)
- Before the Raid (1943) – Docudrama about Norwegian fishermen resistance members. Written by Laurie Lee.
- Night and Day (1945) – Documentary about No. 311 Squadron RAF
- We Will Remain Faithful (1945)
- Song about Slet (1948) – Two-part documentary about the 9th Sokol slet festival

== Awards and nominations ==
Venice Film Festival

Wolf Trap (1957) - 19th Venice International Film Festival

- Won: FIPRESCI Award
- Won: New Cinema Award
- Nominated: Golden Lion

Golden Fern (1963) - 24th Venice International Film Festival

- Nominated: Golden Lion

Martha and I (1991) - 47th Venice International Film Festival

- Nominated: Golden Lion

Berlin International Film Festival

Ninety Degrees in the Shade (1965) - 15th Berlin International Film Festival

- Won: UNICRIT Award

San Sebastian International Film Festival

Romeo, Juliet and Darkness (1959)

- Won: Golden Shell

Murder Czech Style (1967)

- Won: Silver Shell

Golden Globe Awards

Ninety Degrees in the Shade (1965) - 23rd Golden Globe Awards

- Nominated: Best English-Language Foreign Film

== Bibliography ==
- Weiss, Jiří (1935). O věrné Hadimršce a co se kolem ní sběhlo (in Czech). Prague: Melantrich.
- Weiss, Jiří (1945). The Lost Government Or Do You Really Like It?. London: Nicholson & Watson.
- Weiss, Jiří (1966). Jejich starosti / Zátopkovy nohy / Rothschildovy peníze (in Czech). Prague: Československý spisovatel.
- Weiss, Jiří (1995). Bílý Mercedes (in Czech) (1st ed.). Prague: Victoria Publishing. ISBN 80-7187-061-7.
