= The Missing Guest =

1938 film directed by John Rawlins

- Film poster
- Directed by: John Rawlins
- Screenplay by: Charles Martin; Paul Perez
- Based on: Secret of the Blue Room by Arnold Lippschitz
- Starring: PauL Kelly; Constance Moore; William Lundigan
- Cinematography: Milton Krasner
- Edited by: Frank Gross
- Production company: Universal Pictures Co.
- Distributed by: Universal Pictures Co.
- Release date: 12 August 1938
- Running time: 68 minutes
- Country: United States
- Language: English

The Missing Guest is a 1938 American comedy horror mystery film directed by John Rawlins. It is a remake of the 1933 film Secret of the Blue Room.

== Plot ==
A newspaper reporter is sent by his editor to spend a night in a country house where a notorious murder had been committed exactly twenty years before.

== Cast ==
- Paul Kelly as 'Scoop' Hanlon
- Constance Moore as Stephanie Kirkland
- William Lundigan as Larry Dearden
- Edwin Stanley as Dr. Carroll
- Selmer Jackson as Frank Baldrich
- Billy Wayne as 'Vic'
- George Cooper as 'Jake'
- P.J. Kelly as Edwards - the Butler
- Florence Wix as Linda Baldrich
- Harlan Briggs as Frank Kendall - Editor
- Pat C. Flick as Nikolaus Popoulos - Inventor
- John Harmon as Baldrich's Guard
- Guy Usher as Police Inspector McDonald

== Production ==
The Missing Guest was the first of two remakes of the 1933 film Secret of the Blue Room. The film was budgeted at $80,400 and was completed under budget, at $72,000.

Music in The Missing Guest is recycled from previous films including Werewolf of London and Dracula's Daughter.

== Release ==
The Missing Guest was distributed by Universal Pictures on August 12, 1938.

== Reception ==
From contemporary reviews, "Hobe." of Variety referred to the film as a "feeble whodunnit for bottom billing" and that "Every outdated [haunted house] situation and piece of business is included - not only included, but embarrassingly highlighted." The New York World-American stated that "[I]f you know your mystery stories at all, you must know by now how unfunny a couple of presumably comic detectives can be when they get mixed up with spooks, sliding panels, and clutching hands" and found that the film "is a feeble and fumbling attempt at being eerie and funny" Kate Cameron of The New York Daily News said that the comedy in the film was "such feeble fooling that it entirely destroys its purpose and merely serves to shatter whatever illusion the murder and the mystery might otherwise hold for the audience." Frank S. Nugent of The New York Times declared "The cast does as little with it as it deserves, and that is little enough."

In their book on Universal Horror films, the authors stated that "mile-a-minute wisecracks and inane humor stand in for atmosphere and chills" declaring the film to be a "dismal mystery-comedy that serves up none of either." and declaring it to be "one of the worst Universal mysteries of the '30s."
