= Konec starých časů (novel) =

1934 novel by Vladislav Vančura

Konec starých časů is a Czech novel, written by Vladislav Vančura. It was first published in 1934. A film based on the novel was released in 1989.
