= Vlčí jáma (novel) =

1938 novel by Jarmila Glazarová

First edition

Vlčí jáma (English: Wolf's Den or The Wolf Trap) is a Czech psychological novel by Jarmila Glazarová. It was first published in 1938. This novel was Glazarová's first.
