= Arnold Lippschitz =

German writer

- Born: 15 January 1901; Berlin, Prussia, German Empire
- Died: 30 August 1952 (aged 51); Los Angeles
- Other names: Arnold Lipp; Arnold Phillips; Erich Philippi
- Occupation: Screenwriter
- Years active: 1918–1952 (film)

Arnold Lippschitz (1901–1952) was a German screenwriter. Born the son of the playwright Arthur Lippschitz, his young brother was the art director Herbert Lippschitz. He began his film career in 1918 at the end of the First World War. Of Jewish background, he fled Nazi Germany going on to work in the French film industry where he was credited as Arnold Lipp, working among other films on Yoshiwara (1937) by Max Ophüls. Following the German invasion of France he emigrated to America, working in Hollywood where he was credited as Arnold Phillips.

== Selected filmography ==
- The Woman in Doctor's Garb (1920)
- Dance into Happiness (1930)
- The Secret of the Red Cat (1931)
- Crime Reporter Holm (1932)
- Das Millionentestament (1932)
- At Your Orders, Sergeant (1932)
- Secret of the Blue Room (1932)
- The Mystery of the Blue Room (1933)
- The Roberts Case (1933)
- Beauty of the Night (1934)
- Le Roi des Champs-Élysées (1934)
- Three Sailors (1934)
- Wild Cattle (1934)
- De Big van het Regiment (1935)
- The Brighton Strangler (1936)
- Port Arthur (1936)
- Charley's Aunt (1936)
- The Great Refrain (1936)
- Yoshiwara (1937)
- Boulot the Aviator (1937)
- Storm over Asia (1938)
- The Lafarge Case (1938)
- The Missing Guest (1938)
- The Patriot (1938)
- Gambling Daughters (1941)
- One Dangerous Night (1943)
- Bluebeard (1944)
- The Brighton Strangler (1945)
- Jealousy (1945)
- I Am a Fugitive (1946)
- Murder in the Music Hall (1946)
- The Return of Monte Cristo (1946)
- Time Out of Mind (1947)
- Kill or Be Killed (1950)
- Pickup (1951)
- The Girl on the Bridge (1951)
- The Story of Three Loves (1953)

== Bibliography ==
- Waldman, Harry. Nazi Films in America, 1933–1942. McFarland, 2008.
- White, Susan M. The Cinema of Max Ophuls: Magisterial Vision and the Figure of Woman. Columbia University Press, 1995.
