= Geheimnis des blauen Zimmers =

1932 film

- Directed by: Erich Engels
- Screenplay by: Arnold Lippschitz
- Produced by: Erich Engels
- Starring: Theodor Loos; Else Elster; Hans Adalbert Schlettow
- Cinematography: Hugo von Kaweczynski
- Edited by: Paul May
- Music by: Heinz Letton
- Production companies: Engels & Schmidt Tonfilm
- Distributed by: Engels & Schmidt Tonfilm
- Release date: 13 December 1932 (Berlin)
- Running time: 73 minutes
- Country: Germany

Geheimnis des blauen Zimmers (transl. Mystery of the Blue Room) is a 1932 German mystery film directed by Erich Engels and starring Theodor Loos, Else Elster and Hans Adalbert Schlettow.

The film began shooting on 28 October 1932 at Tempelhof Studios in Berlin.

It was remade by Universal Studios in the United States as The Secret of the Blue Room.

== Cast ==
- Theodor Loos as Robert von Hellberg
- Else Elster as Irene von Hellberg
- Hans Adalbert Schlettow as Marineoffizier Axel Brinck
- Wolfgang Staudte as Frank Färber
- Peter Wolff as Thomas Brandt
- Oskar Sima as Kriminalkommissar Schuster
- Gerhard Dammann as Kriminalbeamter Krüger
- Paul Henckels as Diener Paul
- Betty Bird as Zofe Betty
- Reinhold Bernt as Chauffeur Max
- Bernhard Goetzke as Fremder
- Else Wunsch as Dienstmädchen Marie

== Bibliography ==
- Bock, Hans-Michael; Bergfelder, Tim (2009). The Concise CineGraph. Encyclopedia of German Cinema. Berghahn Books.
- Weaver, Tom; Brunas, Michael; Brunas, John (2007) [1990]. Universal Horrors (2 ed.). McFarland & Company. ISBN 978-0-7864-2974-5.
