= Jiřina Šejbalová =

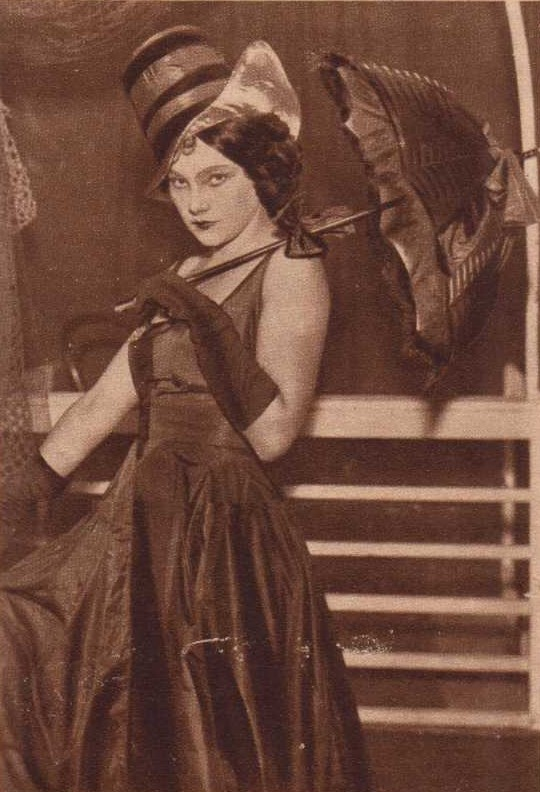
- Born: 17 September 1905; Prague, Austria-Hungary
- Died: 23 August 1981 (aged 75); Prague, Czechoslovakia (now Czech Republic)
- Occupation: Actress
- Years active: 1927–1980

Jiřina Šejbalová (17 September 1905 – 23 August 1981) was a Czech actress of the stage, television, and film. For many years she taught theatre classes at the Janáček Academy of Music and Performing Arts.

== Career ==
Born in Prague, Šejbalová came from a family of clerks. After studying at the Prague Conservatory, she began her career as an opera singer at the National Theatre in Brno in the mid-1920s. During the 1927-1928 season she abandoned her opera career and began working as a dramatic actress at that house in avant-garde plays directed by Jiří Frejka. She became a member of the National Theatre in Prague in 1928. She performed as a stage actress at that theatre up until her retirement in 1971.

Šejbalová made her first foray into Czech film as the title character in the 1929 movie Hanka a Jindra. She appeared in over 35 Czech feature films over the next five decades, with her last appearance being in the 1978 movie Sólo pro starou dámu. Her two most important films were Morálka paní Dulské (1958) and Zlatá svatba (1972). She also appeared is several Czech television movies and television programs from 1961 through 1980. She died in Prague at the age of 75.

== Selected filmography ==
- The Mystery of the Blue Room (1933)
