= Closely Watched Trains =

1966 Czechoslovak film directed by Jiří Menzel

- Theatrical release poster
- Directed by: Jiří Menzel
- Screenplay by: Bohumil Hrabal; Jiří Menzel
- Based on: Closely Watched Trains; 1965 novella by Bohumil Hrabal
- Produced by: Zdeněk Oves
- Starring: Václav Neckář; Jitka Bendová; Josef Somr; Vlastimil Brodský; Vladimír Valenta
- Cinematography: Jaromír Šofr
- Edited by: Jiřina Lukešová
- Music by: Jiří Šust
- Production companies: Barrandov Studios; Československý film
- Distributed by: Ústřední půjčovna filmů
- Release date: 18 November 1966
- Running time: 92 minutes
- Country: Czechoslovakia
- Languages: Czech; German
- Box office: $1,500,000 (US/ Canada)

Closely Watched Trains (Czech: Ostře sledované vlaky) is a 1966 Czechoslovak coming-of-age comedy film. Directed by Jiří Menzel, it is one of the best-known films of the Czechoslovak New Wave. It was released in the United Kingdom as Closely Observed Trains. It is a story about a young man working at a train station in German-occupied Czechoslovakia during World War II. The film is based on a 1965 novella by Bohumil Hrabal. It was produced by Barrandov Studios and filmed on location in Central Bohemia. Released outside Czechoslovakia during 1967, it received widespread acclaim and won the Best Foreign Language Oscar at the 40th Academy Awards in 1968. Nowadays the movie is assessed as one of the finest works of the Czech New Cinema.

== Plot ==
The young Miloš Hrma, who comes from a family of misfits and malingerers, becomes an apprentice train dispatcher at a small railway station during the German occupation of Czechoslovakia near the end of the Second World War. Lanska, the middle-aged, balding stationmaster, is an enthusiastic pigeon-breeder who has a kind wife, but is envious of train dispatcher Hubička's success with women. The railway station is periodically visited by Councillor Zedníček, a Nazi collaborator who spouts optimistic propaganda at the staff, despite the German retreat on all fronts.

Miloš is in a budding relationship with the pretty young conductor Máša. Hubička presses for details, including how she is in bed, but the couple have only progressed to kissing, and Miloš is still a virgin. She invites Miloš to spend the night with her at her uncle's place, a photography studio. Máša is eager for intimacy, but Miloš is very uncomfortable with the situation—the uncle is awake in the next room, and the connecting door will not completely close—and ejaculates prematurely. Angered, Máša gets up and sleeps elsewhere. The next day, he slits his wrists in a bathtub at a brothel, but is saved. A young doctor at the hospital explains to Miloš that ejaculatio praecox is normal at his age, recommending that he "think of something else", such as football, and seek out an experienced woman to help him through his first sexual experience.

During the night shift, Hubička flirts with the young telegraphist, Zdenička, and imprints her thighs and buttocks with the office's rubber stamps, before becoming intimate with her. The next morning, her mother sees the stamp marks and complains to Hubička's superiors.

Meanwhile, Miloš seeks the help of nearly everyone around the station, without much success. When he tries Hubička, the older man confides to him that he and other partisans are planning to destroy a large ammunition train as it passes the station the next morning. He instructs a willing Miloš to signal the train to slow down, and he will drop a bomb onto the train from a semaphore gantry. That night, an attractive resistance agent, code-named Viktoria Freie, delivers the time bomb. Apparently Hubička has prearranged for Viktoria to spend the night with Miloš. They have sex, and Miloš gains confidence in himself.

The next day, as the ammunition train is only minutes away from the station, trouble strikes. Hubička is trapped in a disciplinary hearing, overseen by Zedníček, over his antics with Zdenička. Miloš takes the bomb, climbs the gantry and drops the bomb onto the roof of a train car. However, he is spotted and shot from the train; he falls onto the roof of a car.

When Zedníček determines Zdenička was not coerced in any way, he winds up the hearing by dismissing the Czech people as "nothing but laughing hyenas" (a phrase actually employed by the senior Nazi official Reinhard Heydrich). Then, just around a bend in the track, the train blows up. Máša, who has been waiting to speak with Miloš, picks up his uniform cap, which has been blown to her feet by the powerful winds from the blast.

== Cast ==
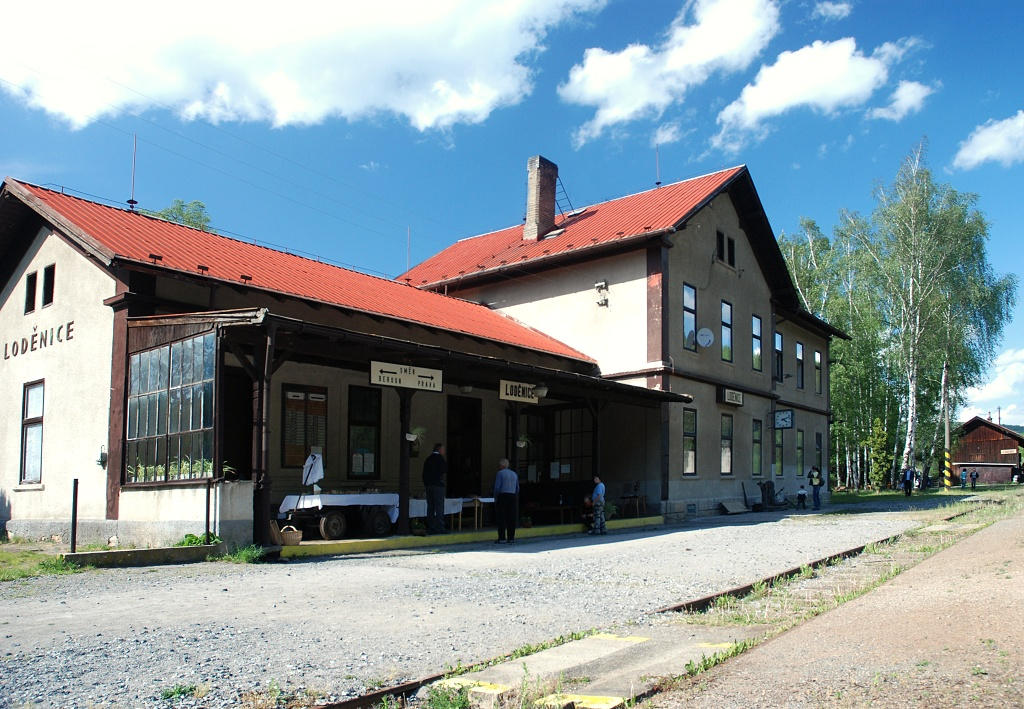
The station building in Loděnice where the film was shot

- Václav Neckář as Miloš Hrma
- Josef Somr as train dispatcher Hubička
- Vlastimil Brodský as councilor Zedníček
- Vladimír Valenta as stationmaster Lanska
- Jitka Bendová as conductor Máša
- Jitka Zelenohorská as telegraphist Zdenička
- Naďa Urbánková as Viktoria Freie
- Libuše Havelková as Lanska's wife
- Milada Ježková as Zdenička's mother
- Jiří Menzel as Doctor Brabec

== Production ==
The film is based on a 1965 novella of the same name by the noted Czech author Bohumil Hrabal, whose work Jiří Menzel had previously adapted to make The Death of Mr. Balthazar, his segment of the anthology film of Hrabal stories Pearls of the Deep (1965). Barrandov Studios first offered this project to the more experienced directors Evald Schorm and Věra Chytilová (Closely Watched Trains was the first feature film directed by Menzel), but neither of them saw a way to adapt the book to film. Menzel and Hrabal worked together closely on the script, making a number of modifications to the novel.

Menzel's first choice for the lead role of Miloš was Vladimír Pucholt, but he was occupied filming Jiří Krejčík's Svatba jako řemen. Menzel considered playing the role himself, but he concluded that, at almost 28, he was too old. Fifteen non-professional actors were then tested before the wife of Ladislav Fikar (a poet and publisher) came up with the suggestion of the pop singer Václav Neckář. Menzel has related that he himself only took on the cameo role of the doctor at the last minute, after the actor originally cast failed to show up for shooting.

Filming began in late February and lasted until the end of April 1966. Locations were used in and around the station building in Loděnice.

The association between Menzel and Hrabal was to continue, with Larks on a String (made in 1969 but not released until 1990), Cutting It Short (1981), The Snowdrop Festival (1984), and I Served the King of England (2006) all being directed by Menzel and based on works by Hrabal.

== Reception ==
The film premiered in Czechoslovakia on 18 November 1966. Release outside Czechoslovakia took place in the following year.

=== Critical response ===
Bosley Crowther of The New York Times called Closely Watched Trains "as expert and moving in its way as was Ján Kadár's and Elmar Klos's The Shop on Main Street or Miloš Forman's Loves of a Blonde," two roughly contemporary films from Czechoslovakia. Crowther wrote:

What it appears Mr. Menzel is aiming at all through his film is just a wonderfully sly, sardonic picture of the embarrassments of a youth coming of age in a peculiarly innocent yet worldly provincial environment. ... The charm of his film is in the quietness and slyness of his earthy comedy, the wonderful finesse of understatements, the wise and humorous understanding of primal sex. And it is in the brilliance with which he counterpoints the casual affairs of his country characters with the realness, the urgency and significance of those passing trains.

Variety's reviewer wrote:

The 28-year-old Jiri Menzel registers a remarkable directorial debut. His sense for witty situations is as impressive as his adroit handling of the players. A special word of praise must go to Bohumil Hrabal, the creator of the literary original; the many amusing gags and imaginative situations are primarily his. The cast is composed of wonderful types down the line.

In his study of the Czechoslovak New Wave, Peter Hames places the film in a broader context, connecting it to, among other things, the most famous anti-hero of Czech literature, Jaroslav Hašek's The Good Soldier Švejk, a fictional World War I soldier whose artful evasion of duty and undermining of authority are sometimes held to epitomize characteristic Czech qualities:

In its attitudes, if not its form, Closely Observed Trains is the Czech film that comes closest to the humour and satire of The Good Soldier Švejk, not least because it is prepared to include the reality of the war as a necessary aspect of its comic vision. The attack on ideological dogmatism, bureaucracy and anachronistic moral values undoubtedly strikes wider targets than the period of Nazi Occupation. However, it would be wrong to reduce the film to a coded reflection on contemporary Czech society: the attitudes and ideas derive from the same conditions that originally inspired Hašek. Insofar as these conditions recur, under the Nazi Occupation or elsewhere, the response will be the same.

On review aggregator Rotten Tomatoes, the film holds an approval rating of 90% based on 21 reviews, with an average score of 7.80/10.

== Awards and honors ==
The film won several international awards:

- The Academy Award for Best Foreign Language Film, awarded in 1968 for films released in 1967
- The Grand Prize at the 1966 Mannheim-Heidelberg International Filmfestival
- A nomination for the 1968 BAFTA Awards for Best Film and Best Soundtrack
- A nomination for the 1968 DGA Award for Outstanding Directorial Achievement in Motion Pictures
- A nomination for the 1967 Golden Globe for Best Foreign-Language Foreign Film

== See also ==
- Czechoslovak New Wave
- List of submissions to the 40th Academy Awards for Best Foreign Language Film
- List of Czechoslovakia submissions for the Academy Award for Best Foreign Language Film
