= Closely Observed Trains (novella) =

1965 novella by Bohumil Hrabal

- Author: Bohumil Hrabal
- Original title: Ostře sledované vlaky
- Translator: Edith Pargeter
- Language: Czech
- Publisher: Československý spisovatel
- Publication date: 1965
- Publication place: Czechoslovakia
- English publication date: 1968
- Pages: 99

Closely Observed Trains (Czech: Ostře sledované vlaky), also published as A Close Watch on the Trains and Closely Watched Trains, is a 1965 novella by the Czech writer Bohumil Hrabal.

== Plot ==
Set in German-occupied Czechoslovakia toward the end of World War II, the story is about a 22-year-old signalman apprentice at a small railroad station who struggles with sexual anxiety and becomes involved with the wartime resistance.

== Reception ==
Closely Observed Trains is Hrabal's most famous work. The scholar Robert Porter writes that "the substance of the work is to be found outside the realms of conventional narrative realism" and describes it as "not so much a war story as a comic exploration of an individual's existential anguish".

== Adaptations ==
The story was adapted into a 1966 Czechoslovak film with the same name, directed by Jiří Menzel. The film is one of the most famous examples of the Czechoslovak New Wave and received the Academy Award for Best Foreign Language Film.

An audio adaptation by the British dramatist Ian Kershaw (not to be confused with Sir Ian Kershaw) was broadcast on BBC Radio 4 2015, with John Bradley as Milos.

== See also ==
- I Served the King of England – Another novel by Hrabal set in wartime Czechoslovakia
