= I Served the King of England =

Book by Bohumil Hrabal

- First edition
- Author: Bohumil Hrabal
- Original title: Obsluhoval jsem anglického krále
- Translator: Paul Wilson
- Language: Czech
- Publisher: Jazzová sekce
- Publication date: 1983
- Publication place: Czechoslovakia
- English publication date: 1989
- Pages: 188 (Czech first edition); 241 (English first edition)
- ISBN: 9788071101215
- OCLC: 469470001
- Dewey Decimal: 891.8/635 (English translation)
- LC Class: PG5039.18.R2 O2713 1990 (English translation)
- Text: I Served the King of England at Internet Archive

I Served the King of England (Czech: Obsluhoval jsem anglického krále) is a novel by the Czech writer Bohumil Hrabal. The story is set in Prague in the 1940s, during the Nazi occupation and early communism, and follows a young man who alternately gets into trouble and has successes. Hrabal wrote the book during a period of censorship in the early 1970s. It began circulating in 1971, and was formally published in 1983. It was adapted into a 2006 film with the same title, directed by Jiří Menzel, a noted director of the Czech New Wave.

== Plot ==
The novel is narrated in the first person and follows the life of Dítě (a name meaning 'child' in Czech), an aspiring hotelier. He is rather short, which causes him to have an inferiority complex; he goes to great lengths to disguise this perceived flaw. At the beginning of the novel, Dítě is starting out as a busboy at the Golden Prague Hotel, which, despite its name, is located in the countryside. Dítě begins to develop a fascination with both women and money which develops throughout the novel. He begins spending his paychecks at the local brothel and enjoys decorating prostitutes' laps with flower petals. His disapproving boss eventually finds out about his habit and puts a stop to it.

The next hotel he works at is a grand estate, but it is almost always empty. In one satirical scene, however, the hotel receives a visit from the country's president (presumed to be Tomáš Masaryk) and his French lover.

Dítě then works at a hotel in Prague itself. He works as a waiter, honing his skills of perception under the watchful tutelage of the headwaiter. When the Emperor of Ethiopia comes to Czechoslovakia for a state visit, he dines at the hotel, and Dítě is awarded a special medal for his diligent service, an honor which he wears proudly throughout the novel. After the dinner, however, Dítě is accused of having stolen a golden spoon that went missing. Ashamed, he attempts to hang himself, but is saved at the last minute when the spoon is found.

Dítě's time at the hotel comes to an end after the beginning of the German occupation of Czechoslovakia. Dítě's girlfriend, Lise, is an ethnic German and an ardent Nazi supporter. While he never sympathizes with her political beliefs, Dítě comes to resent the bad treatment that she receives at the hands of Czechs, including at the restaurant he works. After an altercation with his coworkers over the issue, he is fired.

The two marry and move to a Nazi mountain retreat for pregnant "Aryan" women. Though he attempts to pass as an Aryan himself, the other Germans treat him with condescension and disdain; he must get a dispensation from the doctor in order to be able to impregnate his wife, submitting to a humiliating physical exam in the process. When they eventually do have a child, their son is born retarded, and spends the day hammering nails into the floor.

After expressing doubts about the German invasion of the Soviet Union, Dítě is fired and finds work as a waiter at a café in Prague while Lise works at the front lines. Near the end of the war, Lise is killed in the bombing of Cheb. In the rubble, Dítě finds a briefcase full of stamps stolen from a Jewish ghetto. He sells the stamps and uses the proceeds to build his own hotel in an abandoned quarry. Among his guests is John Steinbeck. The fame and wealth he amasses fulfill the dreams of his youth, and yet his status as a Nazi collaborator leaves him alienated from Prague's other hoteliers. After the communist takeover of Czechoslovakia, the hotel is nationalized, and Dítě is thrown into "millionaire's prison", in which the inmates live in high style and have access to all the luxuries they had on the outside.

After the prison is closed down, Dítě works a brief stint at a lumber mill before securing himself a job as a road repairer in the isolated mountains. He lives largely isolated from the world, save for the company of a few animals. He trades his youthful pursuit of temporal pleasures for quiet contemplation and spiritual growth. He comes to accept himself, overcoming the insecurity he felt throughout his life. The book ends with Dítě describing how he started to write the novel in the first place.

== Reception ==
The English literary critic James Wood wrote in the London Review of Books in 2001: "I Served the King of England is a joyful, picaresque story, which begins with Baron Munchausen–like adventures, and ends in tears and solitude, a modulation typical of Hrabal's greatest work."

== Adaptation ==
After the fall of communism, the Czech filmmaker Jiří Menzel attempted to make a film from I Served the King of England. Menzel had in the past directed several films based on Hrabal's stories, such as Closely Watched Trains and Larks on a String. The struggle to get the film made in the transformed film industry became much publicized, and culminated in 1998, when Menzel, after hearing his producer had sold the rights, attacked the producer at the Karlovy Vary International Film Festival and beat him with a big stick. The stick was later sold at auction. The film rights were passed between different producers, and at one point the story was under development to be turned into a television soap opera. In the early 2000s, a film was under development by the writer-director duo Petr Jarchovský and Jan Hřebejk. In the end Menzel did direct the film. A co-production between Czech, Slovak, German and Hungarian companies, I Served the King of England premiered in the Czech Republic on 21 December 2006.

== See also ==
- Czech literature
