= Postřižinské =

Czech beer brand

- Type: Beer
- Manufacturer: Nymburk Brewery
- Origin: Czech Republic
- Introduced: 1898
- Website: https://www.postriziny.cz/

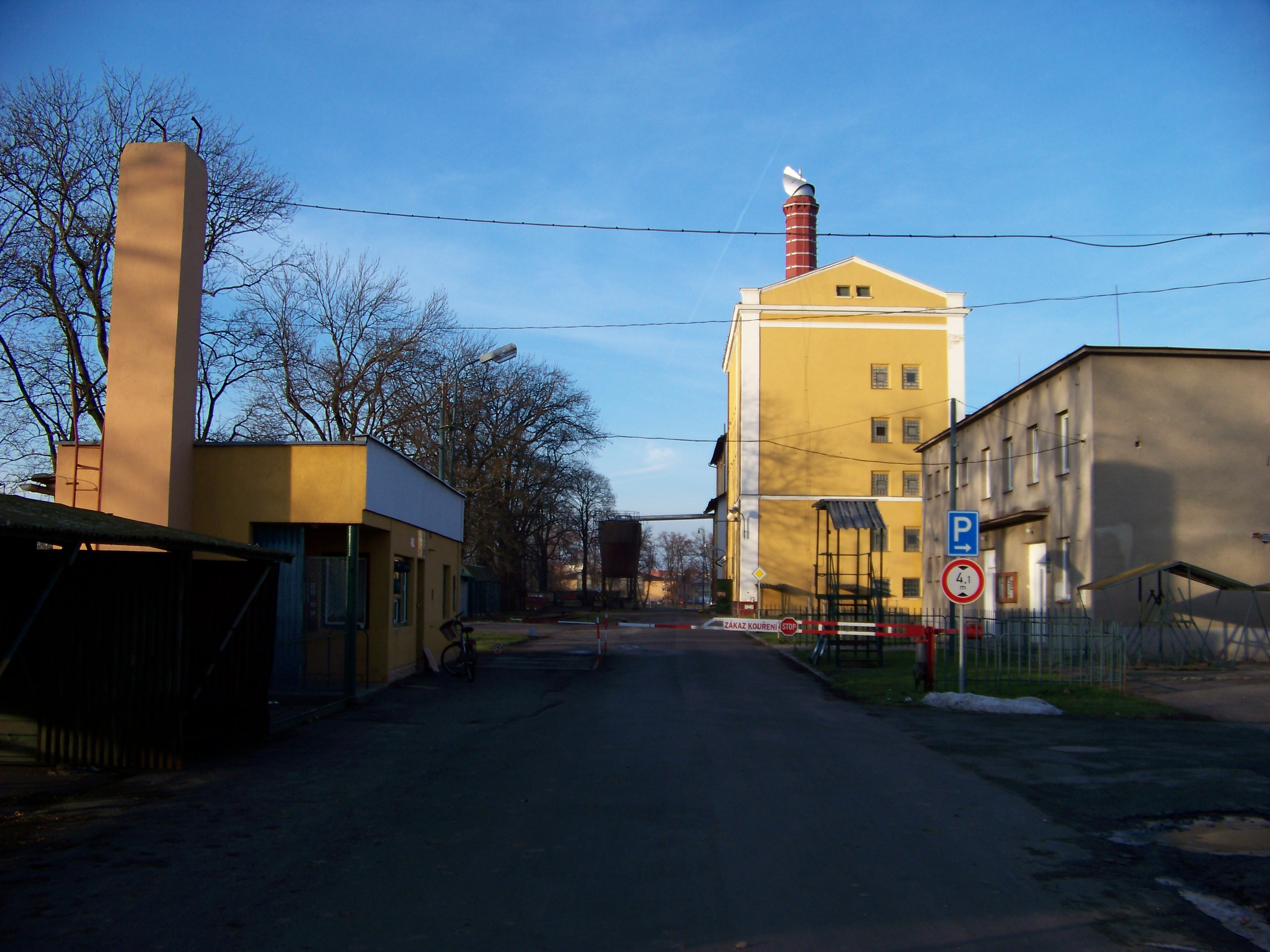
Nymburk Brewery

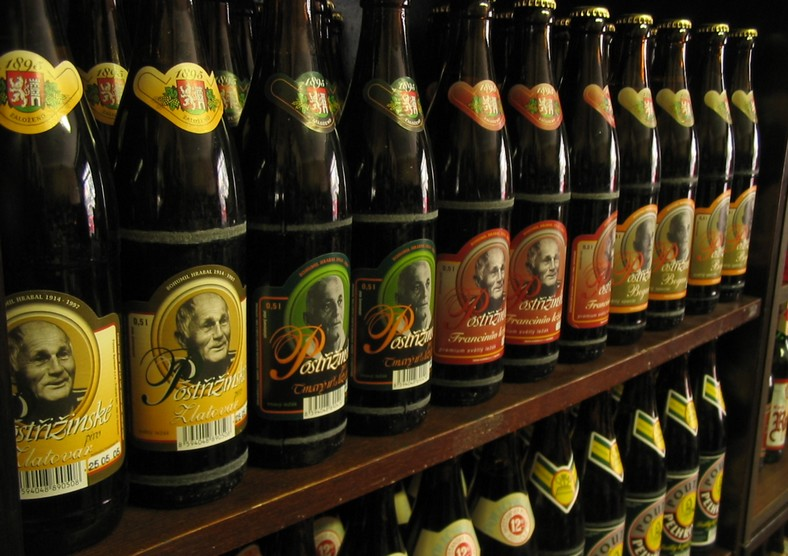
Hrabal's portraits on Postřižinské beers

Postřižinské is a brand of beer produced by the brewery in Nymburk in the Czech Republic.

Nymburk Brewery, founded in 1895, is with its annual production about 200 000 hectoliters among the medium-sized breweries. The name Postřižinské comes from Bohumil Hrabal's book Postřižiny (Cutting It Short in English), later made into a well-known film Cutting It Short (1980) by Jiří Menzel. Bohumil Hrabal spent his childhood in Nymburk as a stepson of the brewery's manager.

== Brands ==
- Postřižinské Výčepní – a pale draught beer, with 3.5 % ABV.
- Postřižinské Pepinova desítka – a 10° pale draught beer, with 4.1% ABV.
- Postřižinské Tmavé – a 11° tmavé výčepní (dark beer) with 4.3% ABV.
- Postřižinské Jedenáctka – a 11° pale lager, with 4.7% ABV.
- Postřižinské Francinův ležák – a 12° pale lager, with 5.1% ABV.
- Postřižinské Něžný barbar – a 13° semi-dark lager, with 5.3% ABV.
- Postřižinské Bogan – a 13.5° pale lager, with 5.5% ABV.
- Postřižinské Sváteční speciál – a 14° special pale lager, with 5.8% ABV.
- Postřižinské Střízlík – non-alcoholic beer.

Export beers:

- Gold Bohemia Beer – a pale beer, with 2.8%, 3.5%, 4.1% and 5.1% ABV, bottled or cans.
- Gold Bohemia Beer Dark – a dark beer, with 4.3% ABV, bottled or cans.
- Nymburk Lager Beer – a pale beer with 3.5% ABV, in cans.
- Postřižinské Ležák – Yeastless lager beer at 5.2% ABV in brown glass bottles.
