= List of Slovak European Film Award winners and nominees =

This is a list of Slovak European Film Award winners and nominees. This list details the performances of Slovak actors, actresses, and films that have either been submitted or nominated for, or have won, a European Film Award.

== Main categories ==
Year	Award	Recipient	Status	Note
2007	People's Choice Award for Best Film	I Served the King of England	Nominated	Czech-Slovak-German-Hungarian co-production

== See also ==
- List of Slovak submissions for the Academy Award for Best Foreign Language Film
