= The Junk Shop =

- Directed by: Juraj Herz
- Written by: Juraj Herz
- Produced by: Milos Broz, Karel Feix
- Starring: Václav Halama, Frantisek Ketzek
- Cinematography: Rudolf Milic
- Edited by: Jaromír Janácek
- Music by: Zdeněk Liška
- Production company: Ústřední půjčovna filmů
- Distributed by: Filmové studio Barrandov
- Release date: 1965
- Running time: 32 minutes
- Country: Czechoslovakia
- Language: Czech

The Junk Shop (Czech: Sběrné surovosti) is a 1965 Czechoslovak comedic short film directed by Juraj Herz, based on a story by Bohumil Hrabal called Baron Prasil. It is the very first film made by the director. Though his very first film, it displays his knack for bizarre, disquieting and creepy visuals that will become more prominent throughout his career. This film was originally intended to be part of the anthology film Pearls of the Deep but it was excluded due to its running time being too long. The film follows a group of comical patrons and shopkeepers at a local junk shop, including Hanta (Václav Halama), the titular Baron Prasil, a pervert, comedian and scoundrel who is missing his front teeth, his boss Bohoušek (František Ketzek), a straight man who is constantly aggravated by the odd personalities at his shop and Mařenka ( Bobina Maršatová ), a beautiful woman who lives on the next floor who Bohoušek admires. Hedvicka is another young woman Bohoušek admires though she offends him when she mentions the scale he steps on lists his weight as 364 pounds. "Cleo" is another patron, an older Hindu woman with facial hair growing in who constantly irritates Bohoušek with tales of her former youth and beauty. The cast is largely non-professional actors which is not unusual for the Czech new wave.

== Cast ==
- Václav Halama as Hanta
- Frantisek Ketzek as Bohoušek
- Bobina Maršatová as Mařenka
- Libuse Palecková as Pepicek's angry mother

== Plot ==
Bohoušek works at his junk shop dealing with very odd people all day. He mentions he would like to win a car in the new contest. He spots Mařenka airing a carpet on the next floor while scantily-clad and imagines her as various famous paintings such as the Mona Lisa. The homely old woman with a mustache Cleo comes in outraged that she is only offered one crown for the love letters from her former suitors. She claims she was a famous beauty and deserves more money for her letters. Hedvicka shows up and weighs herself at 100 pounds on Bohoušek's scale. He tries next and is offended when she says he is 364 pounds. Bohoušek says Hedvicka is lovely and draws circles on the breast of her shirt. She says he deserves to be slapped for that. Cleo shows up again and whines again that her letters are worth so little. She says she was once a famous circus dancer all the men admired and hurls a knife at Bohoušek. He is fed up with her stories and makes her leave. He gives her five crowns to leave him alone. A woman comes in with her son angrily looking for a balance sheet her son lost in the store. They both get lost in the giant pile of Cleo's old love letters at the store and she can't find her son. Hanta and an older coworker then cut up statues of Jesus Christ, angels and other martyrs for their boss. They tell each other vulgar stories and jokes that makes the statue's eyes roll in its head. Hanka says he always expects the "angels" they cut up to bleed and the older man remarks "That only happens the first time." The woman continues looking for her son Pepicek while Bohoušek is angry that his employees cut up the Christ statue. Hanta then visits the bar where the matron is angry that he told everyone she was pregnant. He soothes her anger by quoting excerpts of a romance book called The Baron's Desire for her. Meanwhile Bohoušek's cat became loose and bit 30 kids so the animal services want it put down. He is very angered by this. The angry mother finds the missing boy and immediately scolds him to go back and find the missing balance sheet. Bohoušek is now alone in his room humming O Sole Mio and stacking the bits of the angel statues on one another. He says he pities Hanta for being such a scoundrel and that he will never be a true artist like him. He says his pervert character is all just an act because of the pointlessness of existence. Hanta leaves and tries to hit the mechanical sign in the main hall on the way out but it takes a couple of attempts.

== Production ==
This film was made as part of the anthology film Pearls of the Deep. The other directors of the film initially did not want Herz working on the project because he studied puppetry and not film with FAMU. Jaromil Jireš introduced this project as a group collaboration among his friends and personally vouched to them on behalf of Juraj Herz. Evald Schorm replied very enthusiastically to the suggestion but virtually everyone else was wary of Herz as Herz was studying puppetry. They did not view him as up to par for their project. Jan Kadar went to the Academy's administrators and came to back up Jireš and Herz. The cameraman Jaroslav Kucera did not want to work with Herz so the position was left to Rudolf Milic. Kucera later changed his view of Herz and collaborated with him on Morgiana. It was omitted anyway due to its running time being too long. The runtime is a little over 32 minutes. It became the Herz's first short film and his debut as a director.

Bohumil Hrabal said this was his favorite story from the ones shot for the movie Pearls of the Deep. Hrabal gave him another story to film but the government censors would not permit it to be made.

== Score ==
The movie was scored by Zdenek Liska. Liska had his own editing table for this film. He'd run the film and do the music his way. He did his own style music and at the spots in the film he chose completely against Juraj Herz's orders. Herz thought the finished product was superb though.

== Release ==
The film was released as an extra with the DVD of The Cremator by The Criterion Collection. It is a high-definition digital transfer. The DVD is Criterion spine #1023.
