= The Snowdrop Festival =

1984 Czechoslovak comedy film

- Directed by: Jiří Menzel
- Written by: Jiří Menzel, based on stories by Bohumil Hrabal
- Produced by: Václav Erben
- Starring: Rudolf Hrušínský; Jaromír Hanzlík; Josef Somr; Petr Čepek; Miloslav Štibich; Petr Brukner; Rudolf Hrušínský; Eugen Jegorov; Jiří Schmitzer; Marie Spurná; Blažena Holišová; Ferdinand Havlík; Libuše Šafránková
- Cinematography: Jirí Macák
- Edited by: Jiří Brožek
- Music by: Jiří Šust
- Production company: Barrandov Film Studio
- Release date: 1984
- Running time: 83 minutes
- Country: Czechoslovakia
- Language: Czech

The Snowdrop Festival (Czech: Slavnosti sněženek) is a 1984 Czechoslovak comedy film directed by Jiří Menzel, based on the book by Bohumil Hrabal, who plays a cameo role in the film. The film is set in the small village of Kersko. The film is about the lives, hobbies and relationships of people living in a small village.

== Plot ==
The Snowdrop Festival is a movie about a place and its inhabitants. Jiří Menzel presents us with an insight into the many ordinary and eccentric lives in the village of Kersko. The movie begins with a group of men on their bicycles leaving the local pub. They are drunk and happy, singing songs as they leave together to their houses. On the road they come across the local policemen who removes the valves from their cycles and asks them to walk home as they are drunk. Their happiness disappears, the singing stops, and they walk home.

In the morning we see a hungover guy who is bossed around by his wife and daughter. He doesn't feel like staying home and wants to go out. He never speaks against them but always murmurs when he is told to do something. There is a group of people who seem very polished and educated. They stand out from the rest of the characters with their philosophical thoughts and discussions. The local innkeepers, a couple can't seem to keep their hands off of each other. The story gains its life when two young men who work in the fields see a pig. They try to hunt it down. But the pig escapes and the chase starts. The huntsmen of the village follow the pig to a school in the neighboring village and shoots it down in the classroom, they then explain the anatomy of the pig to the students. We see a very enthusiastic young gentleman taking over the class. As they are getting ready to take the pig and have a feast the huntsmen from the village show up and claim that the meat is theirs as the pig was shot in their territory. There is a small brawl and with the intervention of the schoolteacher they decide to meet at the inn and share the spoils of the hunt.
