= Crime in a Music Hall =

1968 film by Jiří Menzel

Zločin v šantánu
- Directed by: Jiří Menzel
- Written by: Josef Škvorecký; Jiří Suchý; Jiří Menzel
- Starring: Eva Pilarová; Vlastimil Brodský; Rudolf Hrušínský; Jitka Zelenohorská; Jiří Suchý; Jiří Šlitr; Jan Přeučil; Ferdinand Krůta; Jiří Grossmann; Jan Libíček
- Cinematography: Francis Uldrich
- Music by: Jiří Šlitr
- Release date: 1968
- Running time: 83 minutes
- Country: Czechoslovakia
- Language: Czech

Crime in a Music Hall (Czech: Zločin v šantánu) is a 1968 Czechoslovak comedy film directed by Jiří Menzel. The film is based on a story by Josef Škvorecký.

== Plot ==
In the Tartaros cabaret, a pearl necklace is stolen, which leads to a murder. All of this could compromise the minister, who is an ardent admirer of the singer Klára Králová. The real culprits must be found as quickly as possible.
