= Marián Labuda =

Slovak actor (1944–2018)

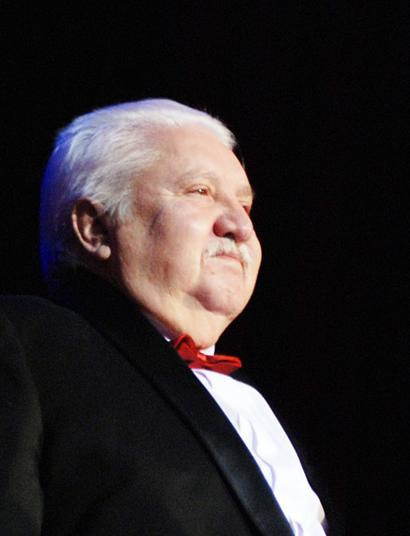
- Marián Labuda in February 2011
- Born: 28 October 1944; Hontianske Nemce, Slovak Republic (now Slovakia)
- Died: 5 January 2018 (aged 73); Bratislava, Slovakia
- Occupation: Actor
- Years active: 1965–2016

Marián Labuda (28 October 1944 – 5 January 2018) was a Slovak actor.

He was born in Hontianske Nemce. In 1964, he graduated from the Academy of Performing Arts in Bratislava (VŠMU). He became a member of the Slovak National Theatre (SND) in Bratislava. In 1967, he moved to the theatre Divadlo na Korze in the same city. Following its closure in 1971 he joined Nová scéna in Bratislava.

In 1990, he returned to SND. He portrayed more than a hundred characters on stage. He also regularly appeared in both Slovak and Czech films. As a singer, he recorded the album Silvester 68 with several well-known personalities in Slovakia. The song "Pichni" from the album was written and sung by himself.

Labuda died in Bratislava on 5 January 2018, aged 73.

== Selected performances ==
- 2005 - Tiso in Tiso, Divadlo Aréna (received Dosky Award)
- 2005 - Leon in The Workroom by Jean-Claude Grumberg, Vinohrady Theatre, Prague
- 1968 - Estragon in Waiting for Godot

== Selected filmography ==
- 2016 - Angel of the Lord 2
- 2008 - Taková normální rodinka
- 2007 - Roming (Roman)
- 2006 - I Served the King of England
- 2000 - Landscape (Kusalik)
- 1999 - All My Loved Ones
- 1997 - Lotrando a Zubejda
- 1997 - Orbis Pictus (Emil)
- 1997 - On the Beautiful Blue Danube (Výťahár)
- 1995 - The Garden (Jakub's Father), received Czech Lion for best supporting actor
- 1994 - The Life and Extraordinary Adventures of Private Ivan Chonkin (Opalikov)
- 1994 - Accumulator 1
- 1991 - Tajomstvo alchymistu Storitza (Stepark)
- 1991 - Meeting Venus
- 1989 - The End of Old Times (Stoklasa)
- 1988 - Dobří holubi se vracejí
- 1985 - My Sweet Little Village (Karel Pávek)
- 1984 - King Thrushbeard (principal, grocer)
- 1976 - Pacho, the Highhwayman of Hybe (Erdödy)
- 1976 - Rosy Dreams (Shop Floor Manager)
- 1966 - Before This Night Is Over
