= Simon Karlinsky =

American literary critic and historian

Simon Karlinsky (22 September 1924 - 5 July 2009) was an American literary critic, historian and professor of Slavic languages.

== Life ==
Karlinsky was born Semyon Arkadyevich Karlinsky on 22 September 1924, in a Russian émigré enclave in Harbin, Manchuria, into a family of Polish descent. He immigrated to the US in October 1938. He attended Belmont High School and Los Angeles City College. He joined the U.S. army in December 1943, where he would work until March 1946, and worked as an interpreter in Germany in the 1950s.He studied music at the École Normale de Musique de Paris under Arthur Honegger from 1951 to 1952, and later at the Berlin Hochschule fur Musik under Boris Blacher. He received his bachelors' degree in Slavic languages and literature from UC Berkeley in 1960. He received his masters' degree from Harvard in 1961, and his doctorate from Berkeley in 1964; his doctoral thesis was about Marina Tsvetaeva. Karlinsky taught at UC Berkeley from 1964 to 1991. He was noted for his writings about Russian emigré literature and homosexuality in Russian literature. He received the Guggenheim Fellowship twice. He inspired a character in Eduard Limonov's book Death of Modern Heroes (Russian: Смерть современных героев, romanized: Smert' sovremennykh geroyev).

Karlinsky was gay, and lived with his husband Peter Carleton for 35 years. The two married in 2008. He died of congestive heart failure on 5 July 2009.

== Selected works ==
- Marina Cvetaeva: Her Life and Art (1966)
- Russia's Gay Literature and History, essay (1976)
- The Sexual Labyrinth of Nikolai Gogol (1976)
- The Bitter Air of Exile: Russian Writers in the West, 1922-1972 (1977)
- Anton Chekhov's Life and Thought: Selected Letters and Commentary (1977, in collaboration with Michael Henry Heim)
- Marina Tsvetaeva: The Woman, Her World, and Her Poetry (1985)
- Russian Drama from its Beginnings to the Age of Pushkin (1985)
