= Bohumil Hrabal =

Czech writer (1914–1997)

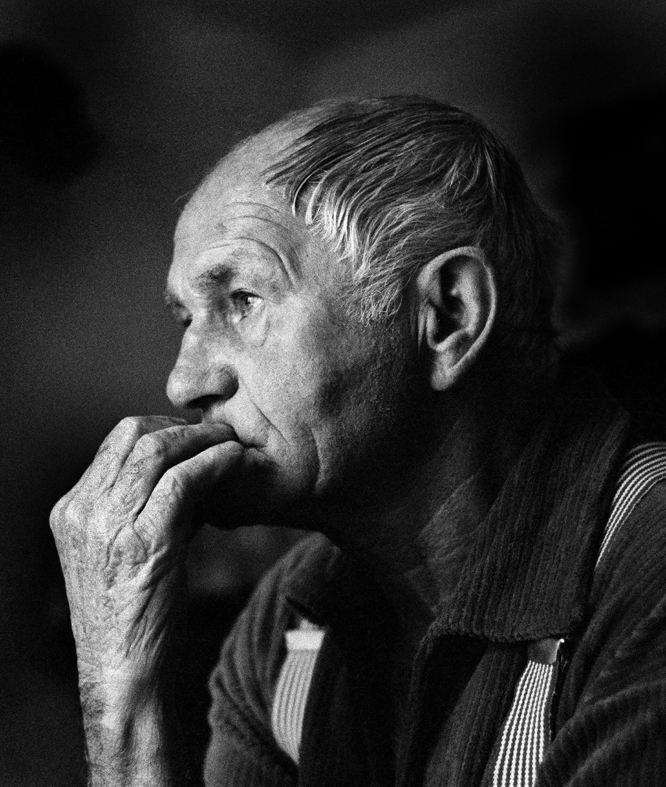
- Portrait of Bohumil Hrabal taken in 1988 by Hana Hamplová
- Born: Bohumil František Kilián; 28 March 1914; Židenice (now part of Brno), Austria-Hungary
- Died: 3 February 1997 (aged 82); Prague, Czech Republic
- Resting place: Hradištko
- Education: Charles University, Prague
- Occupation: Writer
- Spouse: Eliška Plevová (m. 1956; died 1987)
- Writing career
- Period: 1948–1997
- Notable works: Closely Observed Trains; I Served the King of England; Too Loud a Solitude

Signature
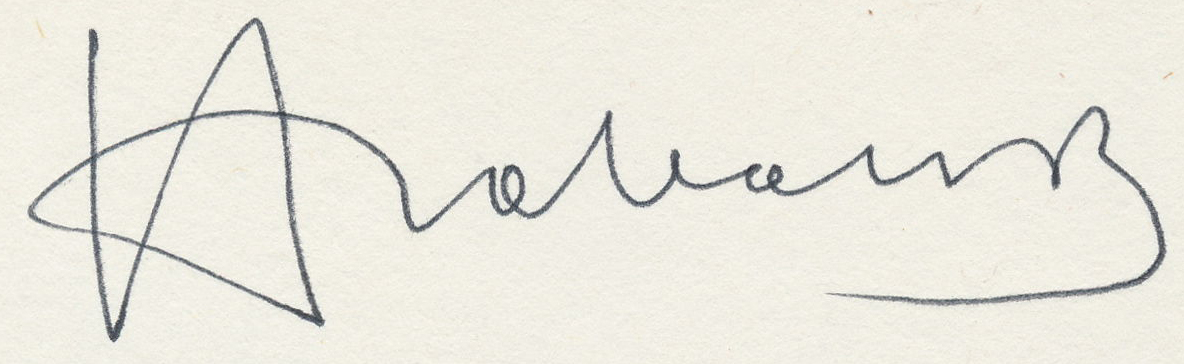

Bohumil Hrabal (Czech pronunciation: [ˈboɦumɪl ˈɦrabal]; 28 March 1914 – 3 February 1997) was a Czech writer, often named among the best Czech writers of the 20th century.

== Early life ==
Hrabal was born in Židenice (suburb of Brno) on 28 March 1914, in what was then the province of Moravia within Austria-Hungary, to an unmarried mother, Marie Božena Kiliánová (1894–1970). According to the organisers of a 2009 Hrabal exhibition in Brno, his biological father was probably Bohumil Blecha (1893–1970), a teacher's son a year older than Marie, who was her friend from the neighbourhood. Marie's parents opposed the idea of their daughter marrying Blecha, as he was about to serve in the Austro-Hungarian Army. World War I started four months after Hrabal's birth, and Blecha was sent to the Italian front, before being invalided out of service. Blecha's daughter, Drahomíra Blechová-Kalvodová, says her father told her when she was 18 that Hrabal was her half-brother. Bohumil and his biological father never met formally, according to Blechová-Kalvodová. Hrabal and Blechová-Kalvodová met twice; a dedication on a picture from 1994 says: "To sister Drahomíra, Hrabal!"

Hrabal was baptised Bohumil František Kilián. Until the age of three, he lived mainly with his grandparents, Kateřina Kiliánová (née Bartlová, died 1950) and Tomáš Kilián (died 1925), a descendant of a French soldier injured at the Battle of Austerlitz, in Brno, while his mother worked in Polná as an assistant book-keeper in the town's brewery. She worked there with her future husband, František Hrabal (1889– 1966); one František Hrabal was listed as Bohumil's godfather when he was baptised on 4 April 1914, but František was also the first name of Bohumil's future step-grandfather, a soft-drinks trader. František Hrabal, Hrabal's stepfather, was a friend of Blecha. He is a prominent character in some of Hrabal's most famous fiction work, and in Gaps, the second volume of his autobiographical trilogy, Hrabal wrote that he declined an invitation to meet his biological father and considered František Hrabal to be his father.

Marie and František married in February 1917, shortly before Bohumil's second birthday. Hrabal's half-brother, Břetislav Josef Hrabal (1916–1985), was born later that year; Břetislav, known as Slávek, is said to have been an excellent raconteur. The family moved in August 1919 to Nymburk, a town on the banks of the Elbe River, where František Hrabal became the manager of a brewery. Both Marie and František were involved in amateur dramatics, though Marie was more active. Hrabal later recalled having a complex about this, and feeling embarrassed by her being the centre of attention.

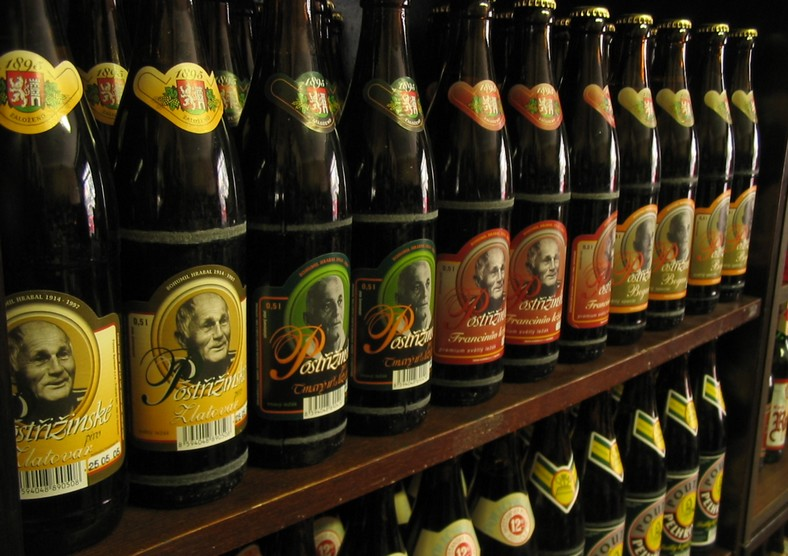
Hrabal's portraits on Postřižinské beers

Hrabal's uncle was Bohuslav Kilián (1892–1942), a lawyer, journalist and publisher of the cultural magazines Salon and Měsíc. The latter had a German version, Der Monat, that was distributed throughout Europe, but not in Nazi Germany.

In 1920, Hrabal started primary school in Nymburk. In September 1925, he spent one year at a grammar school in Brno (now Gymnázium třída Kapitána Jaroše, later attended by Milan Kundera). He failed the first year, and later attended a technical secondary school in Nymburk. There too he struggled to concentrate on his studies, despite extra tutoring from his uncle.

== Wartime activities and early adulthood ==
In June 1934, Hrabal left school with a certificate that said he could be considered for a place at university on a technical course. He took private classes in Latin for a year, passing the state exam in the town of Český Brod with an "adequate" grade on 3 October 1935. On 7 October, he registered at Charles University in Prague to study for a law degree. He graduated only in March 1946, as Czech universities were shut down in 1939 and remained so until the end of Nazi occupation. During the war, he worked as a railway labourer and dispatcher in Kostomlaty, near Nymburk, an experience reflected in one of his best-known works, Closely Observed Trains (Czech: Ostře sledované vlaky). He worked variously as an insurance agent (1946–47), a travelling salesman (1947–49) and a manual labourer alongside the graphic artist Vladimír Boudník in the Kladno steelworks (1949–52, and again briefly, 1953), an experience that inspired the "total realism" of texts such as Jarmilka that he was writing at the time. After a serious injury, he worked in a recycling mill in the Prague district of Libeň as a paper packer (1954–59), before working as a stagehand (1959–62) at the S. K. Neumann Theatre in Prague (today Divadlo pod Palmovkou).

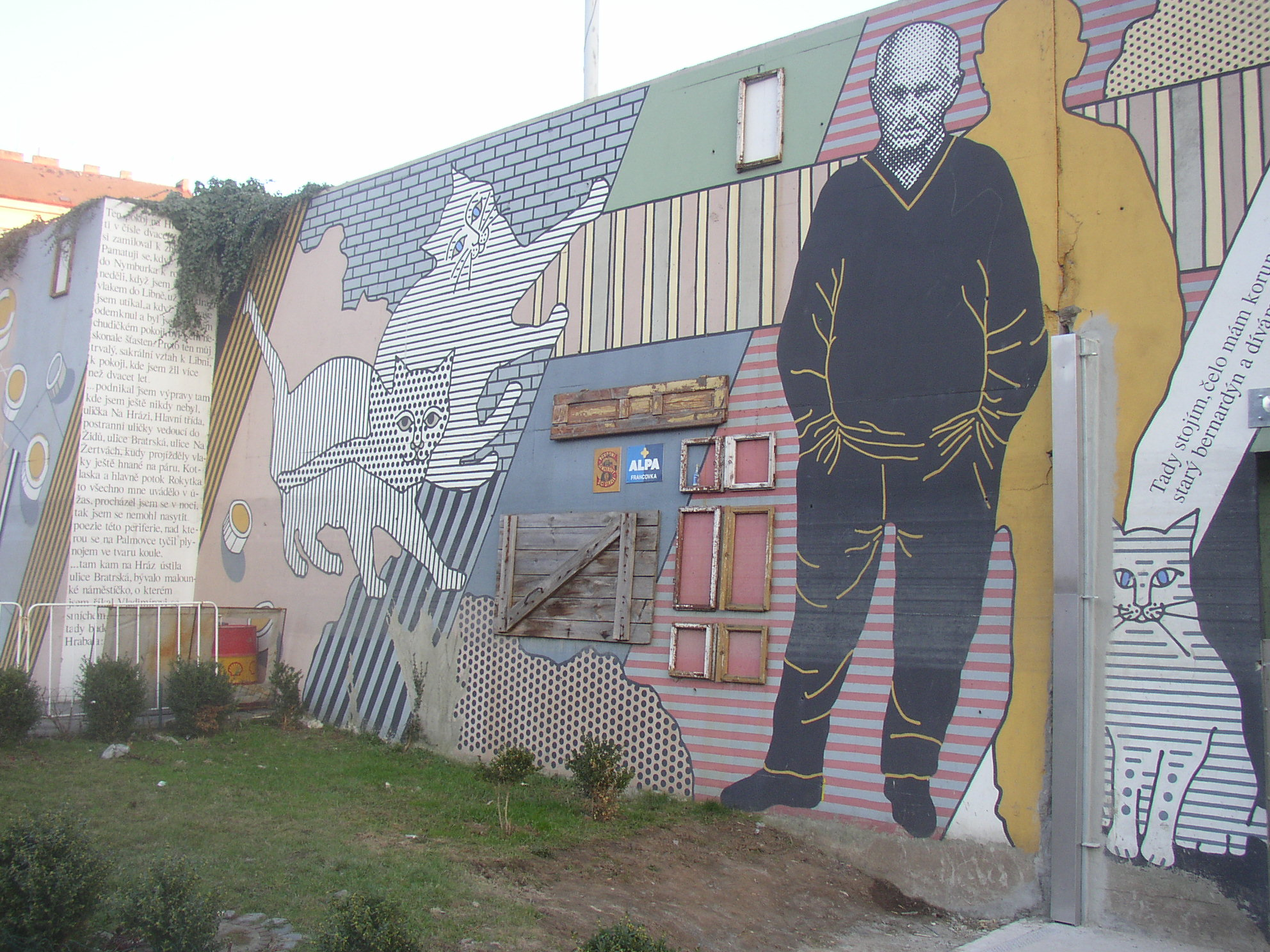
Bohumil Hrabal painted among his beloved cats on the "Hrabal Wall" in Prague

Hrabal lived in the city from the late 1940s onward, for much of it (1950–73) at 24 Na Hrázi ul. in Prague - Libeň; the house was demolished in 1988. In 1956, Hrabal married Eliška Plevová (known as "Pipsi" to Hrabal, and referred to by that name in some of his works), the 30-year-old daughter of Karel Pleva, procurator and manager of a wood factory in the South Moravian town of Břeclav. In 1965, the couple bought a country cottage in Kersko, near Nymburk; the cottage became home to his numerous cats. Eliška died in 1987.

== Early writing career ==
Hrabal began as a poet, producing a collection of lyrical poetry in 1948, entitled Ztracená ulička. It was withdrawn from circulation when the communist regime was established. In the early 1950s, Hrabal was a member of an underground literary group run by Jiří Kolář, an artist, poet, critic and central figure in Czechoslovak culture. Another member of the group was the novelist Josef Škvorecký. Hrabal produced stories for the group, but did not seek publication.

Two stories by Hrabal (Hovory lidí) appeared in 1956 as a supplement in the annual Report of the Association of Czech Bibliophiles (Czech: Zprávy spolku českých bibliofilů), which had a print-run of 250. Hrabal's first book was withdrawn a week before publication, in 1959. It was eventually published in 1963, as Pearls of the Deep (Czech: Perlička na dně). In the same year, he became a professional writer. Dancing Lessons for the Advanced in Age (Czech: Taneční hodiny pro starší a pokročilé) followed in 1964 and Closely Observed Trains (Czech: Ostře sledované vlaky) in 1965.

== Ban from publication and later career ==
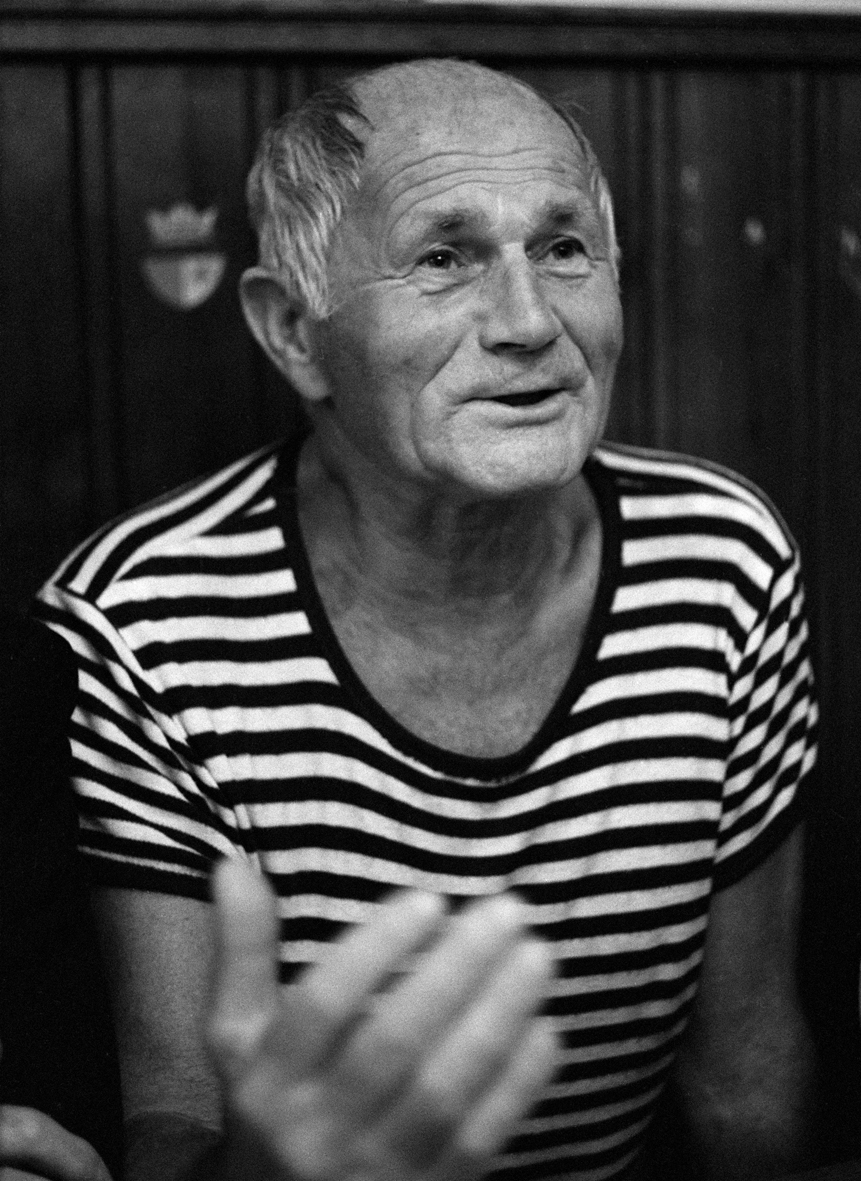
Bohumil Hrabal in 1985

After the Warsaw Pact invasion of Czechoslovakia in August 1968, Hrabal was banned from publishing. In 1970, two of his books – Domácí úkoly and Poupata – were banned, after they had been printed and bound but before they were distributed. In the following years, he published several of his best known works in samizdat editions (including The Little Town Where Time Stood Still (Czech: Městečko, kde se zastavil čas) and I Served the King of England (Czech: Obsluhoval jsem anglického krále).

In 1975, Hrabal gave an interview to the publication Tvorba in which he made self-critical comments, which enabled some of his work to appear in print, albeit typically in heavily edited form. Hrabal's interlocutors were anonymous in the journal, but it was later discovered that the published interview was at least a third version of the text, and that the more explicitly ideological statements were inserted by editors Karel Sýs and Jaromír Pelc according to contemporary party doctrine. One such passage reads "...as a Czech writer I am connected to the Czech people, with its Socialist past and future".

Some young dissidents were incensed by Hrabal's actions; poet Ivan "Magor" Jirous organised an event on Kampa Island at which his books were burned, and the singer Karel Kryl called him a "whore". However, his defenders point out that an edited version of a key text, Handbook for the Apprentice Palaverer (Czech: Rukovět̕ pábitelského učně), was published alongside the interview, which ended the ban on publication and permitted his work once again to reach the broader Czechoslovak public. Ludvík Vaculík, who had published his work in samizdat and would later continue to do so, defended him, saying that the interview demonstrated that Hrabal was a writer of such standing that he could not be suppressed and the regime had had to acknowledge him. Additionally, some of his writings continued to be printed only in samizdat and as underground editions abroad, including Too Loud a Solitude (Czech: Přílíš hlučná samota) which circulated in a number of samizdat editions until it was finally published officially in 1989. Hrabal avoided political engagement, and he was not a signatory of the Charter 77 civic initiative against the communist regime in 1977.

Hrabal's two best-known novels are Closely Observed Trains (Czech: Ostře sledované vlaky) (1965) and I Served the King of England (1971), both of which were made into movies by the Czech director Jiří Menzel (in 1966 and 2006, respectively). Hrabal worked closely with Menzel on the script for Closely Watched Trains which won the Academy Award for Best Foreign Language Film in 1968. The two men became close friends and subsequently collaborated on other film projects, including the long-banned 1969 film Larks on a String.

Hrabal was a noted raconteur, and much of his story-telling took place in a number of pubs including, most famously, U zlatého tygra (At the Golden Tiger) on Husova Street in Prague. He met the Czech President Václav Havel, the American President Bill Clinton and the US ambassador to the UN Madeleine Albright at U zlatého tygra on 11 January 1994.

== Death ==
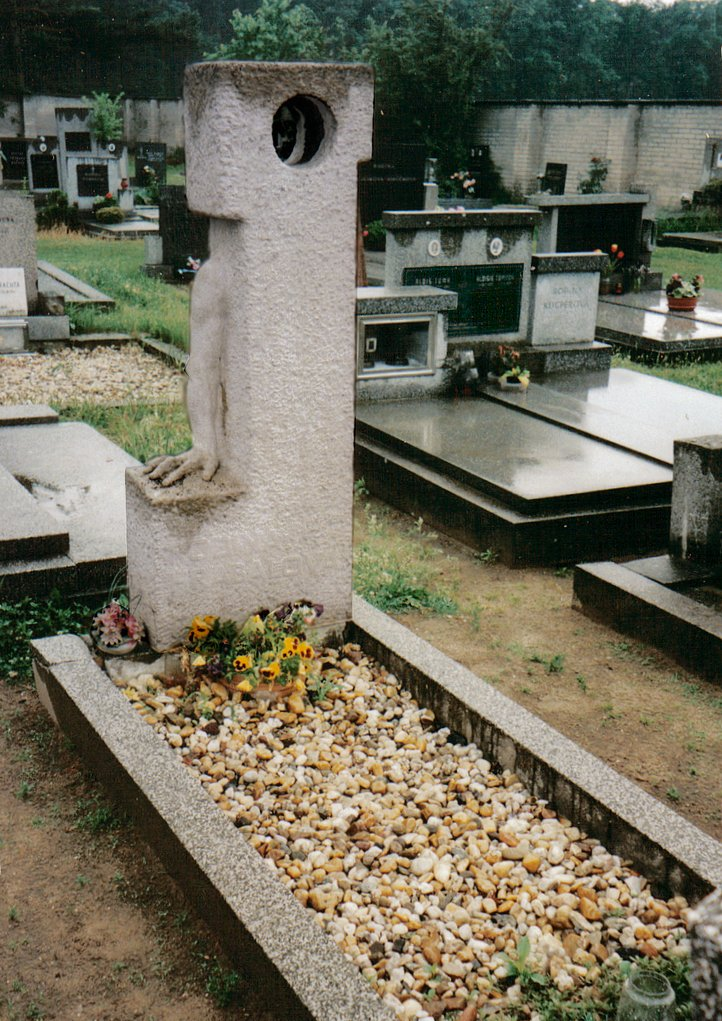
Hrabal's grave

Hrabal died in February 1997 after falling from a window on the fifth floor of Bulovka Hospital in Prague. Initially, there were reports that he fell while attempting to feed pigeons, though these were rejected by friends including his translator, Susanna Roth, who angrily dismissed the reports as a way of censoring Hrabal even in death. The story was later publicly renounced by professor Pavel Dungl, Bulovka's chief physician. First Roth and later Tomáš Mazal noted that suicide recurs as a theme throughout his work, and both Dungl and Mazal said that early in the morning on the day of his death, Hrabal mentioned to Dungl an "invitation" he received in his dream from a dead poet and painter, Karel Hlaváček, who was buried in a cemetery next to the hospital. Some years later, Professor Dungl said he had no doubts about Hrabal's death being a suicide. He was buried in the cemetery of Hradištko near Kersko. According to his wishes, he was buried in an oak coffin marked with the inscription "Pivovar Polná" ('Polná Brewery'), the brewery where his mother and stepfather had met.

== Style ==
Hrabal wrote in an expressive, highly visual style. He affected the use of long sentences; his works Dancing Lessons for the Advanced in Age (1964) and Vita Nuova (1987) consist entirely of one single sentence. Political quandaries and the accompanying moral ambiguities are recurrent themes in his works. Many of Hrabal's characters are portrayed as "wise fools" – simpletons with occasional inadvertently profound thoughts – who are also given to coarse humour, lewdness, and a determination to survive and enjoy life despite harsh circumstances they found themselves in.

Much of the impact of Hrabal's writing derives from his juxtaposition of the beauty and cruelty found in everyday life. Vivid depictions of pain human beings casually inflict on animals (as in the scene where families of mice are caught in a paper compactor) symbolise the pervasiveness of cruelty among human beings. His characterisations also can be comic, giving his prose a baroque or mediaeval tinge. He is known for his "comic, slightly surreal tales about poor workers, eccentrics, failures, and nonconformists"; his early stories are about "social misfits and happily disreputable people".

Alongside fellow satirists Jaroslav Hašek, Karel Čapek and Milan Kundera, Hrabal is often described as one of the greatest Czech writers of the 20th century. Author Ewa Mazierska compared his works to Ladislav Grosman's, in that his literary works typically contained a mixture of comedy and tragedy. His works have been translated into 27 languages.

== Quotations ==
- It's interesting how young poets think of death while old fogies think of girls. — Bohumil Hrabal in Dancing Lessons for the Advanced in Age
- Bohumil Hrabal embodies as no other the fascinating Prague. He couples people's humor to baroque imagination. — Milan Kundera.
- To spend our days betting on three-legged horses with beautiful names — Bohumil Hrabal

== Works ==
=== In Czech ===
The complete works edition of Hrabal spisy was published in the 1990s in 19 volumes by Pražská imaginace.

Year	Title	Title in English	Publisher	Notes	ISBN
1948	Ztracená ulička	A Lost Alley	Hrádek		ISBN 9788070230800
1963	Perlička na dně	Pearls of the Deep	Československý spisovatel		ISBN 9788020419279
1964	Pábitelé	Palaverers	Mladá Fronta		ISBN 9788020415431
1964	Taneční hodiny pro starší a pokročilé	Dancing Lessons for the Advanced in Age	Československý spisovatel		ISBN 9788020408792
1965	Ostře sledované vlaky	Closely Observed Trains	Československý spisovatel		ISBN 978-80-204-2948-3
1965	Inzerát na dům, ve kterém už nechci bydlet	An Advertisement for the House I Don't Want to Live in Anymore	Mladá Fronta		ISBN 9788020421401
1966	Automat svět	The World Cafeteria/The Death of Mr Baltisberger	Mladá Fronta		ISBN 9780349101583
1967	Toto město je ve společné péči obyvatel	This Town is Jointly Administered by its Inhabitants	Československý spisovatel		ISBN 9788071857907
1968	Morytáty a legendy	Murder Ballads and Other Legends	Československý spisovatel		ISBN 9788020408228
1970	Domácí úkoly, Úvahy a rozhovory	Homework: Contemplations and Interviews	Mladá Fronta		ISBN 978-80-204-3278-0
1970	Poupata	Buds	Mladá Fronta	Confiscated and burnt by the Communist regime	ISBN 9788020402714
1973	Obsluhoval jsem anglického krále	I Served the King of England	Petlice	Samizdat; Petlice was a secret, anti-Communist publishing house	ISBN 9788020201423
1974	Něžný barbar	The Gentle Barbarian	Petlice	Exile edition: 1981	ISBN 9788020701107
1974	Postřižiny	Cutting It Short	Petlice		ISBN 978-80-204-2043-5
1974	Městečko, kde se zastavil čas	The Little Town Where Time Stood Still	Petlice	Exile Edition: 1978	ISBN 978-80-204-1361-1
1977	Příliš hlučná samota	Too Loud a Solitude	Česká expedice	Exile edition: 1980; Česká expedice was a secret, anti-Communist publishing house	ISBN 9788020701565
1978	Slavnosti sněženek	Snowdrop Festival	Československý spisovatel		ISBN 9788020419064
1979	Krasosmutnění	Joyful Blues/Beautiful Sadness	Československý spisovatel		ISBN 9788020433435
1981	Harlekýnovy milióny	Harlequin's Millions	Československý spisovatel		ISBN 9788071853060
1981	Kluby poezie	Poetry Clubs	Mladá Fronta		ISBN 9788020423290
1982	Domácí úkoly z pilnosti		Československý spisovatel		OCLC 479201923
1986	Život bez smokingu	Life Without a Tuxedo	Československý spisovatel		ISBN 978-80-274-0834-4
1986	Svatby v domě	In-House Weddings	Pražská imaginace	Exile edition: 1987; Pražská imaginace was a secret, anti-Communist publishing house	ISBN 0887811922
1986	Vita nuova		Pražská imaginace	Exile edition: 1987	ISBN 0810125463
1986	Proluky	Vacant Lot/Gaps	Petlice	Exile edition: 1986	ISBN 978-0887811685
1986	Kličky na kapesníku – Kdo jsem	Knots on a Handkerchief – Who I Am: Interviews	Pražská imaginace		ISBN 80-208-0984-8
1989	Chcete vidět Zlatou Prahu?: výbor z povídek		Mladá fronta	Jaromír Pelc (ed.)	ISBN 8020400567
1990	Totální strachy	Total Fears: Letters to Dubenka			ISBN 8071100234
1990	Listopadový uragán	November Hurricane	Tvorba		ISBN 9788020426871
1990	Bambino di Praga; Barvotisky; Krásná Poldi		Československý spisovatel		ISBN 8020201475
1991	Ponorné říčky	Underground Rivers	Pražská imaginace		ISBN 80-7110-025-0
1991	Růžový kavalír	Pink Cavalier	Pražská imaginace		ISBN 80-7110-055-2
1991	Atomová mašina značky Perkeo		Československý spisovatel		ISBN 8020801332
1991	Básnění		Pražská imaginace		ISBN 9788071100638
1992	Aurora na mělčině	Aurora on the Sandbank	Pražská imaginace		ISBN 8071101044
1993	Večerníčky pro Cassia	Cassius's Evening Fairytales	Pražská imaginace		ISBN 8071101176
1997	Bibliografie dodatky rejstříky		Pražská imaginace		ISBN 9788071101666
1998	Já si vzpomínám jen a jen na slunečné dny		Triton		ISBN 9788386646609
1999	Buďte tak hodná, vytáhněte rolety: výbor z milostné korespondence		Triton		ISBN 9788072540686
2014	Skřivánek na niti			Hrabal spisy collection #2; short stories (Perlička na dně, Pábitelé, Inzerát na dům, ve kterém už nechci bydlet, Morytáty a legendy)	ISBN 9788020432810
2015	Jsme jako olivy			Hrabal spisy collection #3; short stories (Taneční hodiny pro starší a pokročilé, Ostře sledované vlaky, Postřižiny, Městečko, kde se zastavil čas, Něžný barbar, Obsluhoval jsem anglického krále, Příliš hlučná samota)	ISBN 9788020433367
2016	Rukověť pábitelského učně			Hrabal spisy collection #4; short stories (Slavnosti sněženek, Krasosmutnění, Harlekýnovy miliony, Autíčko)	ISBN 978-80-246-2499-0
2016	Život bez rukávů			Hrabal spisy collection #4; autobiographical trilogy	ISBN 80-204-0236-5
2017	Křehký dluh			Hrabal spisy collection #1; poetry	ISBN 9788020432803

=== Selected English-language editions ===
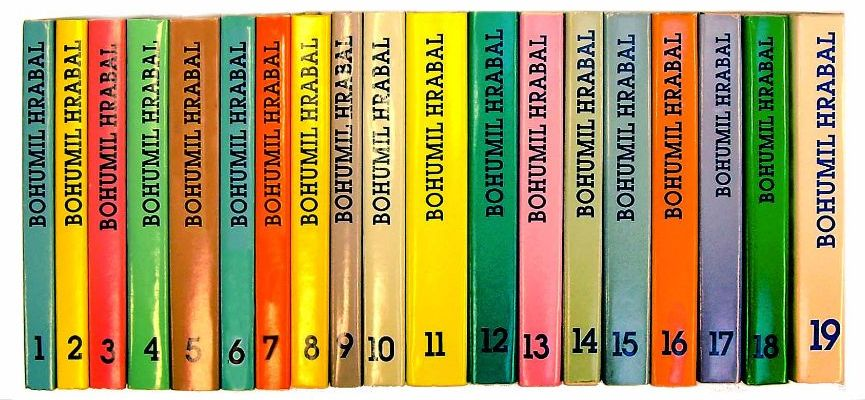
Complete works in 19 volumes by Pražská imaginace

Year	Title	Translator	Publisher	Notes	ISBN
1968	A Close Watch on the Trains or Closely Observed Trains or Closely Watched Trains	Edith Pargeter	Jonathan Cape	Foreword by Josef Škvorecký	ISBN 9780810112780
1975	The Death of Mr Baltisberger	Michael Henry Heim	Doubleday		ISBN 9780810127012
1992	Cutting It Short	James Naughton	Time Warner Books UK		ISBN 0356206688
1993	The Little Town Where Time Stood Still	James Naughton	Pantheon Books		ISBN 9780679422259
1989	I Served the King of England	Paul Wilson	Harcourt Brace Jovanovich		ISBN 9780811216876
1990	Too Loud a Solitude	Michael Henry Heim	Harcourt Brace Jovanovich		ISBN 9780233987019
1995	Dancing Lessons for the Advanced in Age	Michael Henry Heim	Harcourt Brace		ISBN 0151238103
1998	Total Fears: Letters to Dubenka	James Naughton	Twisted Spoon Press		ISBN 9788090217195
2007	In-House Weddings (Writings From An Unbound Europe)	Tony Liman	Northwestern University Press		ISBN 0810124300
2008	Pirouettes on a Postage Stamp	David Short	Karolinum Press		ISBN 9788024614472
2010	Vita Nuova: A Novel	Tony Liman	Northwestern University Press		ISBN 0810125463
2011	Gaps: A Novel (Writings From An Unbound Europe)	Tony Liman	Northwestern University Press		ISBN 9780810125506
2012	Harlequin's Millions	Stacey Knecht	Archipelago Books		ISBN 9780981955735
2014	Rambling On: An Apprentice's Guide to the Gift of the Gab	David Short	Karolinum Press		ISBN 9788024632865
2015	Mr. Kafka: And Other Tales from the Time of the Cult	Paul Wilson	New Directions Publishing		ISBN 0811224805
2019	All My Cats	Paul Wilson	New Directions Publishing		ISBN 9780811228954
2020	Why I Write?: The Early Prose from 1945 to 1952	David Short	Karolinum Press		ISBN 9788024642680
2021	The Gentle Barbarian	Paul Wilson	New Directions		ISBN 978-0-8112-2858-9

== Film adaptations ==
Year	Title	Based on	Language(s)	Director	Notes
1964	Fádní odpoledne	Fádní odpoledne		Ivan Passer	
1966	Smrt pana Baltazara	Automat svět	Czech	Jiří Menzel	Segments of the anthology film Pearls of the Deep
1966	Podvodníci	Short story "Swindlers"	Czech	Jan Němec	Segments of the anthology film Pearls of the Deep
1966	Dům radosti	Chapter V of Bambini di Praga	Czech	Evald Schorm	Segments of the anthology film Pearls of the Deep
1966	Automat Svět	Automat Svět	Czech	Věra Chytilová	Segments of the anthology film Pearls of the Deep
1966	Romance	Short story "Gypsy Romance"	Czech	Jaromil Jireš	Segments of the anthology film Pearls of the Deep
1965	Sběrné surovosti	Baron Prášil	Czech	Juraj Herz	Originally filmed as part of the anthology film Pearls of the Deep
1966	Ostře sledované vlaky	Ostře sledované vlaky	Czech, German	Jiří Menzel	
1969	Skřivánci na niti	Inzerát na dům, ve kterém už nechci bydlet	Czech	Jiří Menzel	
1980	Postřižiny	Postřižiny	Czech	Jiří Menzel	
1981	Mořská Miss	Chapter "Such A Beautiful Mourning" from Siren		Magdaléna Příhodová	
1984	Slavnosti sněženek	Slavnosti sněženek	Czech	Jiří Menzel	
1989	Něžný barbar	Něžný barbar		Petr Koliha	
1994	Andělské oči	Bambini di Praga		Dušan Klein	
1995	Une trop bruyante solitude	Příliš hlučná samota		Véra Caïs	
2006	Obsluhoval jsem anglického krále	Obsluhoval jsem anglického krále	Czech	Jiří Menzel	
