= The Gates of Paradise (novel) =

1960 novel by Jerzy Andrzejewski

The Gates of Paradise (Polish: Bramy raju) is a novel by Polish writer Jerzy Andrzejewski published in 1960. The novel consists of 40,000 words written in two sentences, with nearly no punctuation, making it an exercise in constrained writing. The second sentence contains only four words: "I szli całą noc" ("And they marched all night").

The book tells the story of the Children's Crusade of 1212 trying to reach the Holy Land. The idealistic naivety of major participants is contrasted with the cynicism of others, who are morally corrupted while in charge. The author makes allusions to a somewhat similar situation existing in communist Poland of his own time.

== See also ==
- Angel Down (novel)
- Dancing Lessons for the Advanced in Age
- Ducks, Newburyport
- Gadsby (novel)
- Gates to Paradise (1968 film)
