= Michael Henry Heim =

American literary translator and scholar (1943–2012)

- Born: January 21, 1943; Manhattan, New York City, New York, U.S.
- Died: September 29, 2012 (aged 69); Westwood, Los Angeles, California, U.S.
- Education: Columbia University (B.A., 1964); Harvard University (Ph.D., 1971)
- Occupations: Literary translator; scholar
- Employer: University of California, Los Angeles (from 1972)
- Spouse(s): Priscilla Heim, née Smith (m. 1975)
- Children: 3 stepchildren

Michael Henry Heim (January 21, 1943 – September 29, 2012) was an American literary translator and scholar. He translated literature from eight languages (Russian, Czech, Serbo-Croatian, German, Dutch, French, Romanian, and Hungarian), including works by Anton Chekhov, Milan Kundera, and Günter Grass. He received his doctorate in Slavic languages and literature from Harvard in 1971, and joined the faculty of UCLA the following year. In 2003, he and his wife used their life savings ($734,000) to establish the PEN Translation Fund.

== Biography ==
Heim was born in Manhattan, New York City, on January 21, 1943. His father, Imre Heim, was Hungarian, born in Budapest. He moved to the U.S. in 1939, where he was a music composer (under the pseudonym Imre Hajdu) and a master baker. In New York, Imre was working as a piano teacher when he was introduced to Blanche, Heim's mother, whom he married shortly thereafter. Shortly after Pearl Harbor, Imre joined the U.S. Army. At the time of Heim's birth, Imre was stationed in Alabama.

Heim's father died when he was four, and he was raised by his mother and step-father in Staten Island. In 1966, he was drafted into the US Army during the Vietnam War. When it was discovered that he was the sole surviving son of a soldier who had died in service, he was relieved from the draft.

During the Soviet invasion of Czechoslovakia in 1968, Heim was in Prague employed as a translator by UNESCO. When the tanks rolled into Prague, he was able to translate between Czech and Russian, thereby facilitating communications between the Soviet soldiers and the Czechoslovaks on the streets. With his knowledge of German, he was also able to assist a West German television crew in navigating the occupied city and interviewing ordinary Czech citizens, and to warn potential victims that Soviet agents were looking for them.

He was married for thirty-seven years to his wife, Priscilla Smith Kerr, who brought three children of her own, Rebecca, Jocelyn and Michael, into the family from a previous marriage. He died on September 29, 2012, of complications from melanoma.

=== Education ===
Heim graduated from Curtis High School on Staten Island, where he studied French and German. He double-majored in Oriental Civilization and Russian Language and Literature, studying Chinese and Russian at Columbia University as an undergraduate, and worked with Gregory Rabassa, an acclaimed translator. As an American citizen, he had no chance of visiting China after his graduation, so he decided to concentrate on Russian at the postgraduate level. He received his Ph.D. in Slavic Languages from Harvard University in 1971, under the mentorship of Roman Jakobson.

=== Career ===
Heim was one of the finest and most prolific translators of his age. He was also a faculty member of the UCLA Department of Slavic Languages and Literatures for nearly 40 years, being promoted prior to his death to UCLA Distinguished Professor.

Every two years, Heim taught a workshop in literary translation at UCLA's Department of Comparative Literature, which was highly regarded by his students.

Heim served as editor of a translation series published by Northwestern University Press, and was several times a juror for the National Endowment for the Humanities.

After Heim's death, it was revealed with his wife's permission that he was the secret donor behind the PEN Translation Fund, which was set up in 2003 with his gift of $730,000. In 2023, Priscilla Heim made another significant donation, this time to establish the Michael Henry Heim Chair in Central and East European Letters at Indiana University, the first recipient of which was Bill Johnston. {needs citation}

== Awards and recognition ==
Heim garnered unusually wide recognition for his translations, and was considered one of the foremost literary translators of the late twentieth century. He won the 2005 Helen and Kurt Wolff Translator's Prize for German-to-English translation of Thomas Mann’s Death in Venice (Der Tod in Venedig). He received the PEN/Ralph Manheim Medal for Translation in 2009. In 2010, he received the PEN Translation Prize for his translation from the Dutch of Wonder (De verwondering, 1962) by Hugo Claus. The same book was also short-listed for Three Percent's Best Translated Book Award.

Besides his celebrated translations, Heim was lauded for his research on 18th-century Russian writers and their philosophies of translation, at a time "when the process of literary creation occurred largely through the prism of translation."

Heim was inducted into the American Academy of Arts and Sciences in 2002, and received a Guggenheim Fellowship in 2006.

== Publications ==
=== Original works ===
- Heim, Michael Henry (1979). The Russian Journey of Karel Havlíček Borovský (PDF). Munich: Verlag Otto Sagner. ISBN 3-87690-161-8.
- Heim, Michael Henry (1982). Contemporary Czech. Columbus, Ohio: Slavica Publishers. ISBN 0-89357-098-2.
- Matich, Olga; Heim, Michael Henry, eds. (1984). The Third Wave: Russian Literature in Emigration. Ann Arbor, Michigan: Ardis Publishers. ISBN 0-88233-782-3.
- Heim, Michael Henry (1999). Un Babel fericit (PDF) (in Romanian). Iaşi: Editura Polirom. ISBN 973-683-386-0.

=== Translations ===
==== From Russian ====
- Ageyev, M. (1984). Novel with Cocaine. New York: E. P. Dutton. ISBN 0-525-24294-5.
- Aksyonov, Vasily (1983). The Island of Crimea. New York: Random House. ISBN 0-394-52431-4.
- Aksyonov, Vasily (1987). In Search of Melancholy Baby. Translated by Michael Henry Heim and Antonina W. Bouis. New York: Random House. ISBN 0-394-54364-5.
- Chekhov, Anton (1973). Karlinsky, Simon (ed.). Letters of Anton Chekhov. New York: Harper & Row. ISBN 0-06-012263-3. (Republished by Northwestern University Press in 1997 as Anton Chekhov's Life and Thought: Selected Letters and Commentaries. ISBN 0-8101-1460-7.)
- Chekhov, Anton (2003). Chekhov: The Essential Plays. New York: Modern Library. ISBN 978-0-375-76134-8.
- Chekhov, Anton (2010). Easter Week. Mainz, Germany: Shackman Press.
- Chukovsky, Kornei (2005). Erlich, Victor (ed.). Diary, 1901–1969. New Haven: Yale University Press. ISBN 0-300-10611-4.
- Roziner, Felix (1991). A Certain Finkelmeyer. New York: W. W. Norton & Company. ISBN 0-393-02962-X.
- Sokolov, Sasha (1989). Astrophobia. New York: Grove Weidenfeld. ISBN 0-8021-1087-8.
- Uspensky, Eduard (1993). Uncle Fedya, His Dog, and His Cat. New York: Alfred A. Knopt. ISBN 0-679-82064-7.

==== From Czech ====
- Čapek, Karel (1995). Talks with T. G. Masaryk. New Haven, Connecticut: Catbird Press. ISBN 0-945774-26-5.
- Hirsal, Josef (1997). A Bohemian Youth. Evanston, Illinois: Northwestern University Press. ISBN 0-8101-1223-X.
- Hrabal, Bohumil (1975). The Death of Mr. Baltisberger. Garden City, New York: Doubleday & Company. ISBN 0-385-00692-6.
- Hrabal, Bohumil (1990). Too Loud a Solitude. San Diego, California: Harcourt Brace Jovanovich. ISBN 0-15-190491-X.
- Hrabal, Bohumil (1995). Dancing Lessons for the Advanced in Age. New York: Harcourt Brace & Company. ISBN 0-15-123810-3.
- Kundera, Milan (1980). The Book of Laughter and Forgetting. New York: Alfred A. Knopt. ISBN 0-394-50896-3.
- Kundera, Milan (1982). The Joke. New York: Harper & Row. ISBN 0-06-014987-6.
- Kundera, Milan (1984). The Unbearable Lightness of Being. New York: Harper & Row. ISBN 0-06-015258-3.
- Neruda, Jan (1993). Prague Tales. London: Chatto & Windus.

==== From Serbian ====
- Kiš, Danilo (1989). The Encyclopedia of the Dead. New York: Farrar, Straus and Giroux. ISBN 0-374-14826-0.
- Kiš, Danilo (1998). Early Sorrows (For Children and Sensitive Readers). New York: New Directions. ISBN 0-8112-1390-0.
- Matvejević, Predrag (1999). Mediterranean: A Cultural Landscape. Berkeley: University of California Press. ISBN 0-520-20738-6.
- Tišma, Aleksandar (1998). The Book of Blam. New York: Harcourt Brace & Company. ISBN 0-15-100235-5.
- Tsernianski, Miloš (1994). Migrations. New York: Harcourt Brace & Company. ISBN 0-15-159556-9.

==== From Croatian ====
- Ugrešić, Dubravka (1991). Fording the Stream of Consciousness. London: Virago Press. ISBN 1-85381-251-X.
- Ugrešić, Dubravka (1992). In the Jaws of Life. Translated by Michael Henry Heim and Celia Hawkesworth. London: Virago Press. ISBN 1-85381-252-8.
- Ugrešić, Dubravka (2005). The Ministry of Pain. London: Saqi. ISBN 0-86356-058-X.

==== From German ====
- Enzensberger, Hans Magnus (1998). The Number Devil: A Mathematical Adventure. New York: Henry Holt & Company. ISBN 0-8050-5770-6.
- Grass, Günter (1999). My Century. New York: Harcourt. ISBN 0-15-100496-X.
- Grass, Günter (2007). Peeling the Onion. New York: Harcourt. ISBN 978-0-15-101477-4.
- Mann, Thomas (2004). Death in Venice. New York: HarperCollins. ISBN 0-06-057605-7.
- Mora, Terézia (2007). Day In Day Out. New York: Harper Perennial. ISBN 978-0-06-083264-3.
- Schlink, Bernhard (2008). Homecoming. New York: Pantheon Books. ISBN 978-0-375-42091-7.

==== From Dutch ====
- Claus, Hugo (2009). Wonder. New York: Archipelago Books. ISBN 978-0-9800330-1-4.

==== From French ====
- Kundera, Milan (1985). Jacques and His Master. New York: Harper & Row. ISBN 0-06-091222-7.
- Troyat, Henri (1986). Chekhov. New York: E. P. Dutton. ISBN 0-525-24406-9.

==== From Romanian ====
- Blecher, Max (2015). Adventures In Immediate Irreality. New York: New Directions. ISBN 978-0-8112-1760-6.

==== From Hungarian ====
- Esterházy, Péter (1992). Helping Verbs of the Heart. London: Quartet Books. ISBN 0-7043-0174-1.
- Konrád, George (1995). The Melancholy of Rebirth: Essays from Post-Communist Central Europe, 1989–1994. New York: Harcourt Brace & Company. ISBN 0-15-600252-3.
- Örkény, István (1982). The Flower Show & The Toth Family. Translated by Michael Henry Heim and Clara Gyorgyey. New York: New Directions. ISBN 0-8112-0836-2.
