= The End of Old Times =

- Directed by: Jiří Menzel
- Written by: Jiří Blažek, Jiří Menzel
- Starring: Josef Abrhám, Marián Labuda
- Cinematography: Jaromír Šofr
- Edited by: Jiří Brožek
- Music by: Jiří Šust
- Release date: September 4, 1989 (MFF)
- Running time: 1h 37min
- Country: Czechoslovakia
- Language: Czech

The End of Old Times (Czech: Konec starých časů) is a 1989 Czechoslovak comedy film directed by Jiří Menzel.

== Cast ==
- Josef Abrhám – Duke Alexej
- Marián Labuda – Stoklasa
- Jaromír Hanzlík – Spera
- Rudolf Hrušínský – Jakub Lhota
- Jan Hartl – Pustina
- Jan Hrušínský – Jan Lhota
- Jiří Adamíra – Kotera
- Josef Somr – Charousek
