= Ducks, Newburyport =

2019 novel by Lucy Ellmann

- First trade edition cover
- Author: Lucy Ellmann
- Language: English
- Set in: Newcomerstown, Ohio in 2017
- Publisher: Galley Beggar Press
- Publication date: 4 July 2019
- Publication place: United Kingdom
- Media type: Print (Paperback)
- Pages: 1,030
- Awards: Goldsmiths Prize (2019)
- ISBN: 978-1-910296-96-7

Ducks, Newburyport is a 2019 novel by British author Lucy Ellmann. The novel is written in the stream-of-consciousness narrative style, and mostly consists of a single long sentence that lists the main character's thoughts over the course of the novel. The novel includes the phrase "the fact that" more than 19,000 times. The book runs over 1000 pages. It won the 2019 Goldsmiths Prize and was shortlisted for the 2019 Booker Prize.

== Plot ==
The novel's main character is an unnamed middle-aged woman who lives in Newcomerstown, Ohio. She is married, has four children, and was an adjunct college professor of history at the fictitious Peolia College. She narrates the novel from a first-person perspective and largely in present tense. She has been treated for at least two major health problems, including a heart defect as a child and cancer (possibly rectal) as an adult. She quit her college teaching job to recover from the cancer treatment. The narrator spends most of her time caring for her children and making pies and other baked goods, which she sells to local restaurants and shops to shore up her family's finances. She complains of constant exhaustion and is given to bouts of weeping.

The narrator's stream-of-consciousness takes the form of an internal dialog in which she ponders a variety of topics, ideas, recollections, and individual words in an almost-continuous list that spans the entire novel. These include the following: what she happens to be doing at the present moment; baking and cooking; descriptions of her present-day family situation; recollections about her past; musings about individuals, family members, celebrities, and acquaintances; observations about classic American films (often The Sound of Music or Now, Voyager); observations about her favorite books (often those of Jane Austen, Laura Ingalls Wilder, and Lucy Maud Montgomery); expressions of anxiety about national and global problems (often widespread pollution and climate change); and admissions of her own personal problems and shortcomings. She also simply free associates in long strings of similar-sounding words, names, and acronyms. She mentions so many abbreviations and acronyms, a glossary of them is provided in the print edition of the novel.

The narrator explains that this unremitting inner dialog keeps her mind occupied so that she does not dwell on unpleasant realities (such as the doomed environment and the death of her mother), but this tactic evidently does not always succeed.

The narrator repeatedly professes deep affection for her mother, whom she refers to as "Mommy." In one recollection, the narrator reveals that when her mother was a child, she (Mommy) was saved by a sister from drowning in a lake in Newburyport, Massachusetts, after she went chasing after ducks. The word combinations "ducks, Newburyport" and "Newburyport, ducks" appear several times in the narrator's free-association. The narrator dwells on her mother's cancer and death at a relatively young age, which the narrator claims "broke" her. She considers the way that her life since her mother's death has been marked by grief and ennui, although she also celebrates the things that bring her joy in life, such as her second husband (Leo) and her children.

In the course of the narrator's stream-of-consciousness various narrative incidents are revealed. In one, the narrator is delivering pies in the middle of winter when her car gets a flat tire. Having forgotten her cell phone, she waits in her car in the cold for help for an extended period before a tow-truck driver named Jesus saves her. In another incident of stranding, the narrator takes her children to the local shopping mall, where they are prevented from leaving by a severe rainstorm and flash flooding.

The narrator often frets about global problems and how these might negatively affect her and her family. These problems include the following: climate change; the mistreatment of industrial livestock (especially chickens); viral pandemics; mass shootings and other forms of violence; economic uncertainty; and the U.S. presidency of Donald Trump. A frequently mentioned problem is the widespread pollution of the world's streams, lakes, and oceans by plastic, industrial chemicals, and pharmacological substances.

The continuous stream-of-consciousness is interrupted only by short episodes of a story involving a mountain lioness. These interludes are revealed by a separate, omniscient narrator. They are inserted into the single-sentence narrative at intervals. Unlike the rest of the novel, the lioness episodes exhibit a more customary narrative structure, with discrete sentences, paragraphs, and a focused, cohesive story. In this sub-plot, the lioness (probably an eastern cougar) mates and then gives birth to a litter of cubs in the wilderness of Appalachia. Later, while the lioness is away from her den, the cubs are found and taken by humans. The lioness then roams West Virginia, Pennsylvania, and Ohio in search of them. The novel includes a map of the lioness's circuitous quest, which describes a colossal spiral, terminating at Alligator Mound in Granville, Ohio. After each lioness episode, the single-sentence stream-of-consciousness narrative resumes.

== Writing and publication ==
Most of the novel comprises a long sentence, broken in clauses and separated by commas and semi-colons. It uses "the fact that" as the phrase beginning many of these clauses.

The novel was published by Galley Beggar Press in Norwich, England after it was rejected by Ellmann's regular publisher, Bloomsbury. The North American publishing rights were bought by the Windsor, Canada-based publisher Biblioasis.

== Reception ==
A critic writing for Kirkus Reviews said the book was an example of "literary experimentation that, while surely innovative, could have made its point in a quarter the space", and compared it with Ulysses for its size and word association games. Katy Waldman, writing for The New Yorker, called it an encyclopedic novel, a concept popularized by Edward Mendelson, as it renders "full range of knowledge and beliefs of a national culture". Nick Major, for The Herald, said that he enjoyed the novel but could not tell what it was about, or decide whether "it's a masterpiece or a terrible splurge of fearful polemic and word association". A review in Publishers Weekly called the novel a monologue that "confronts the currents of contemporary America" and summed it up as "undoubtedly brilliant".

== Awards ==
- Longlist, 2020 Prix Médicis étranger
- Winner, 2019 Goldsmiths Prize
- Shortlist, 2019 Booker Prize
- Winner, 2023 Kulturhuset Stadsteatern's International Literature Prize

== Publication history ==
- Ducks, Newburyport. Vol. Limited Edition. United Kingdom: Galley Beggar Press. 4 July 2019. ISBN 978-1910296974. 1,022 pages
- Ducks, Newburyport. Vol. First Trade Edition. United Kingdom: Galley Beggar Press. 4 July 2019. ISBN 978-1910296967. 1,030 pages
- Ducks, Newburyport. United States: Biblioasis. 10 September 2019. ISBN 9781771963077. 1,040 pages

=== Translations ===
- French: Les lionnes, lit. 'The Lionesses'. Translated by Christophe Claro. Paris: Seuil. 2020. ISBN 9782021434835.
- Spanish: Patos, Newburyport. Translated by Enrique Maldonado. Madrid: Automática Editorial. 2022. ISBN 9788415509776.
- Swedish: Ankor, Newburyport. Translated by Eva Åsefeldt. Stockholm: Albert Bonniers Förlag. 2022. ISBN 9789100184056.
- Turkish: Ördekler, Newburyport. Translated by Mahir Koçak. Ankara: Yedi Yayınları. 2023. ISBN 9786259926100.

== See also ==
- Angel Down (novel)
- Dancing Lessons for the Advanced in Age
- The Gates of Paradise (novel)
