= Too Loud a Solitude =

1976 novel by Bohumil Hrabal

- First self-published edition
- Author: Bohumil Hrabal
- Original title: Příliš hlučná samota
- Translator: Michael Henry Heim
- Language: Czech
- Genre: Political fiction
- Publisher: Harcourt Brace (English)
- Publication date: 1976
- Publication place: Czechoslovakia
- English publication date: 1990
- Media type: Print
- Pages: 112
- ISBN: 0-15-190491-X

Too Loud a Solitude (Czech: Příliš hlučná samota) is a short novel by Czech writer Bohumil Hrabal. It was self-published in samizdat in 1976 and officially in Czechoslovakia in 1989 due to political censorship. It tells the story of an old man who works as a paper crusher in Prague, using his job to save and amass astounding numbers of rare and banned books; he is an obsessive collector of knowledge during an era of censorship. The book was translated into English by Michael Henry Heim in 1990.

== Background ==
Despite earning a law degree from Charles University in 1946, Hrabal never practiced as a lawyer and instead worked various jobs until beginning to write full time in 1962. He compacted wastepaper in a recycling facility from October 1954 until February 1959, and during this time wrote his first fictional account of his experiences featuring Haňťa as the protagonist.

After working many odd jobs, Hrabal eventually began writing full time, but he was banned from publication after the Warsaw Pact invasion of Czechoslovakia in 1968 and the normalization of the communist regime. He continued writing, though, and returned to the topic of paper compacting in three versions of Příliš hlučná samota. The first he wrote on a typewriter in 1971, the second some years later by making photocopies, and the third in 1988 by word processor.

Hrabal was permitted to publish in Czechoslovakia again starting in 1976, but his texts were heavily reworked and censored. At the same time, though, his work was published abroad in translations from the uncensored samizdat. Too Loud a Solitude was printed in Czech in West Germany and translated into several languages. In the 1980s, the text was published in France after having been adapted to theater productions. Sergio Corduas first translated the text into Italian for the publishing house Einaudi in 1987 as Una solitudine troppo rumorosa and revised the work in 2003.

Because of the complex and censored history of the book, copies printed before 1989 may vary. However, in 1989, shortly before the Velvet Revolution, Too Loud a Solitude was finally officially published in Czechoslovakia, but to little acclaim. In 1990, the book was translated into English and received positively by some critics.

== Plot summary ==
The novel is narrated in the first person by Haňťa, a reclusive man nearing retirement who has spent his life compacting wastepaper for recycling in a cellar in Prague. In addition to compacting butcher paper, wastepaper, and scraps, he also compacts banned books ordered to be destroyed. He stops his work to read and rescue books, and over the thirty-five years of his career, has gained an encyclopedic literary knowledge and filled his home with over two tons of books. He has a particular penchant for works of philosophy and religion. Moreover, he works incredibly slowly as he wraps each bale of paper with reproductions of classic European artworks, and places at the center of every bale a rare book.

Haňťa considers these bales to be works of art and hopes upon retiring to buy his hydraulic press, just as his beloved uncle bought a railroad signal tower and a locomotive when he retired from working on the railroad. His uncle now gives rides on the train to local children and his friends. Haňťa similarly dreams of creating one bale a day once he retires. Each bale will be a true work of art, and after one year, he will invite people to view the bales in an exhibition and help visitors create their own bales.

Haňťa continues with his work, dreaming, recalling memories, and ruminating on his daily activities. His uncle dies, and he is called to take care of the body, which sparks Haňťa to remember the long-lost love of his youth, who he refers to only as a Gypsy girl. He recalls flying a kite together. One day, she was not waiting for him when he came home from work. Haňťa later learned she was captured by Gestapo and sent to a concentration camp. When she did not return at the end of the war, Haňťa burned their kite. He now does not remember her name.

Haňťa hears of a new automatic paper compacting press run by the Brigade of Socialist Labor. He visits the press and is shocked by its efficiency and the impersonal approach of its workers. He runs back to his own press and begins working fervently, feeling that his artistic days are over. It is too late, though, as his boss says he will waste no more time on Haňťa. In a dream-like sequence, Haňťa visits another love of his youth, who has taken up with an artist who is building a statue of her in the form of an angel.

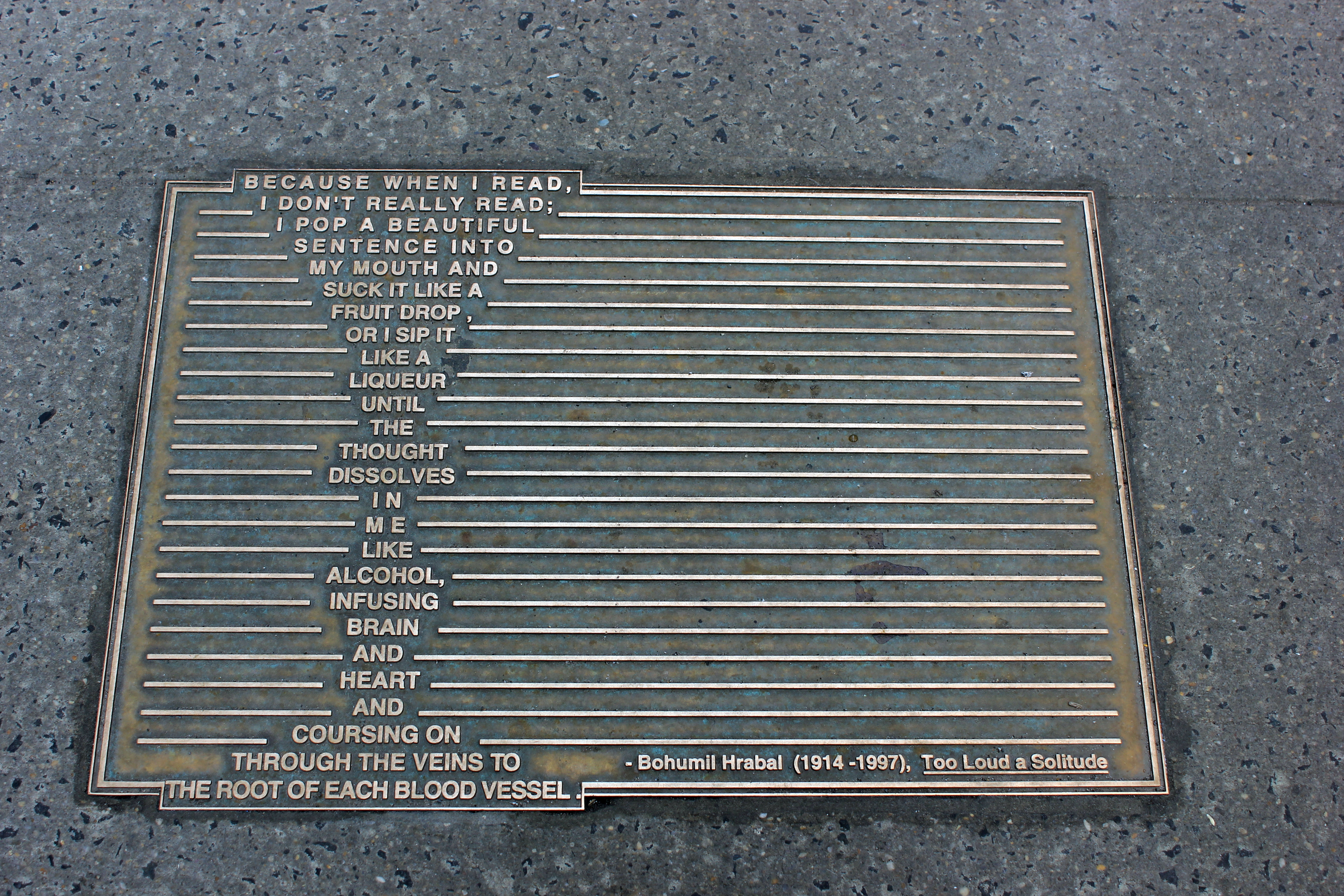
"Because when I read, I don't really read; I pop a beautiful sentence into my mouth and suck it like a fruit drop ...."

Two Socialist Laborers take over Haňťa's press, and he is reassigned to compacting entirely clean paper. Unable to watch the Socialists work efficiently and impersonally, Haňťa rescues one last book to bring to a friend. He embarks on another dream-like sequence through town, stopping at multiple breweries and contemplating the change he is facing. He finally walks almost unconsciously to his cellar. Defiantly, he places himself in his press, clutching a book by Novalis, he starts up the compactor. At the moment of his death, Haňťa sees a vision of his Gypsy girl flying a kite with his face. Through the images, he finally remembers her name, Ilonka.

== Style ==
Biographers have cited the influence of Hrabal's uncle and childhood on his writing style. Hrabal did not take to schooling well, and instead preferred an informal education, rambling around town, observing people at their jobs, and listening to how they spoke and what they spoke about. In addition, his uncle stayed with his family for an extended period in his childhood, and he enjoyed listening to his uncle's long-winded reminiscences. This rambling fashion of storytelling informed the way Hrabal would write much of his prose.

Too Loud a Solitude is written in this characteristic style, which Hrabal called pábení and which most closely translates to "palavering." The narrative meanders through Haňťa's daily life as he travels between work and home, through his interactions with others, through his memories, and through the wisdom he learns from his beloved books. This wandering narrative style advances the plot slowly and takes the time to explore symbolism and themes within the novel.

== Genre ==
In part because of this narrative style and because of the complex themes of the novel, Too Loud a Solitude is not easily categorized into a genre.

=== Total realism ===
In many ways, Hrabal followed the genre conventions created by his friend and fellow Czech author Egon Bondy of total realism. Bondy's early works of total realism took the form of poems described as "very short life studies" and characterized by "an intense tension between the natural quality of everyday situations and the non-natural quality of social and political life" in Czechoslovakia in the 1950s.

Under censorship once again, Hrabal returned to total realism in the 1970s. He similarly creates "tension between raw spontaneity and learned wisdom" in Too Loud a Solitude. Thus, the novel may easily be categorized under total realism. However, because total realism is a relatively unknown genre, readers tend to categorize Too Loud a Solitude differently.

=== Allegory ===
It is tempting to read Too Loud a Solitude as an allegory for resistance to censorship and oppression. The New York Times review of the 1990 English translation described the book as, "a parable of the effort to maintain a semblance of sanity despite the presence or the memories of Nazi jackboots and Russian tanks in Prague."

The book deals with the complexities of life in Czechoslovakia throughout three and a half decades, such as destroying Nazi propaganda and gold-gilded books from the Royal Prussian Library after World War II. However, the novel defies a straightforward reading as a single allegory or parable by exploring multiple themes that can each be read allegorically.

== Themes ==
Too Loud a Solitude explores different themes with symbolism about and allegorical commentary on life in Czechoslovakia under censorship.

=== Violence and destruction ===
Haňťa comments that he has learned the beauty of destruction through compacting books. He says,

"Books have taught me the joy of devastation: I love cloudbursts and demolition crew, I can stand for hours watching the carefully co-ordinated pumping motions of detonation experts as they blast entire houses, entire streets, into the air while seeming only to fill tires" (3–4).

He equates this type of destruction to the work he does compacting books and various types of wastepaper.

This is particularly prescient considering historical context of the book. Haňťa recalls an instance after World War II when he was given innumerable exquisite volumes to destroy. He identified the books as being from the Royal Prussian Library and gathers intelligence that the books are being stored in a barn. Haňťa informs the army librarian and the two attempt to rescue the books, but an information leak leads to the books being declared official booty. The volumes are loaded onto railroad flatcars, where the rain makes the ink and gold of the gilded pages run. Haňťa was devastated, but now recalls how many years of the same kind of destruction has desensitized him (10–12).

After viewing the automatic press, Haňťa envisions his paper press as a "Press of the Apocalypse," big enough to engulf all of Prague. He first sees himself operating the press, destroying the city, but then imagines that he is being crushed in the press by the Brigade of Socialist Laborers, "nothing more than the tiniest of mice" (85).

This motif of rodents recurs throughout the book. Haňťa describes mice nesting in his cellar and eventually being crushed in his press (15). He subsequently shares his fear that the two tons of books in his house will crush him in retaliation for the mice he kills every day (17). Later, after recalling the death of his lost love in Nazi concentration camps, Haňťa reflects on all the mice he has killed, saying he'd forgotten compassion and love (61).

In addition, there is recurring reference throughout Too Loud a Solitude to a rat war taking place beneath the city. This phenomenon is observed by Haňťa's friends who, like him, are scholars working underneath the city in central-heating control rooms and sewers. The scholars report a war between white rats and brown rats waging in the sewers (22). Haňťa muses that when the rat war is over peace will only last until the rats find a motive to start fighting again (25). The rat war is used as a symbol of the futility and persistence of human violence.

=== Technological advances ===
The tension that sparks Haňťa's downfall is between the technology of the new press and his manual press. This advancement in technology can be seen as representing a tension between the old ways and the new, between Haňťa's devotion to reading and the destruction of books by the Socialist Laborers without discrimination. Haňťa comments,

"What scared me was that suddenly I knew for certain that the gigantic press before me was sounding the knell of all smaller presses, I saw that all this meant a new era in my specialty, that these people were different and their habits different. Gone were the days of small joys, of finds, of books thrown away by mistake: these people represented a new way of thinking" (65–66).

=== Materiality of books and the indestructibility of ideas ===
The main theme of Too Loud a Solitude is of the permanence and intangibility of ideas which may, for a time, come to manifest in the form of books and words. The indestructibility of ideas is contrasted with the material form of books, which are repeatedly destroyed. Haňťa equates books to bodies as he destroys them, saying, "Rare books perish in my press, under my hands, yet I am unable to stop their flow: I am nothing but a refined butcher" (3). Similarly, Haňťa recalls how after his mother was cremated and her ashes spread,

"For a long time thereafter I would hear the crunch of human skeletons whenever my hydraulic press entered its final phase and crushed the beautiful books with a force of twenty atmospheres, I would hear the crunch of human skeletons and feel I was grinding up the skulls of press-crushes classics, the part of the Talmud that says, 'For we are like olives: only when we are crushed do we yield what is best in us'" (14).

On the other hand, ideas cannot be destroyed. Even though the physical copy of a book is destroyed, the idea lives on. Haňťa thinks,

"How much more beautiful it must have been in the days when the only place a thought could make its mark was the human brain and anybody wanting to squelch ideas had to compact human heads, but even that wouldn't have helped, because real thoughts come from outside and travel with us like the noodle soup we take to work; in other words, inquisitors burn books in vain" (2).

The notion that ideas are indestructible even when books are destroyed can be understood as resisting censorship, as even when books are banned or destroyed, their ideas are spread.

== Adaptations ==
A live-action film adaptation was released in the Czech Republic in 1996, one year before Hrabal's death. Adapted for film by Véra Caïs, the Czech-French-German production starred Philippe Noiret as Haňťa.

In 2007, director Genevieve Anderson released a 17-minute stop motion and puppetry short film based on the novel starring Paul Giamatti as Haňťa. According to the film's website, the creators are still working to make a feature-length film.

== See also ==
- Czech literature
