= Dancing Lessons for the Advanced in Age =

1964 novel by Bohumil Hrabal

- First edition
- Author: Bohumil Hrabal
- Original title: Taneční hodiny pro starší a pokročilé
- Translator: Michael Henry Heim
- Language: Czech
- Publisher: Československý spisovatel
- Publication date: 1964
- Publication place: Czech
- English publication date: 1995
- Pages: 128

Dancing Lessons for the Advanced in Age (Czech: Taneční hodiny pro starší a pokročilé) is a 1964 novel by the Czech writer Bohumil Hrabal. It tells the story of a man who recounts various events from his past, and in particular his love life. The novel is written in one long sentence.

== Reception ==
The book was reviewed in Publishers Weekly in 1995, where the critic described it as a "humorous and breathless affair". The review continued: "Hrabal, who has been cited as a major literary influence by Milan Kundera and Ivan Klima, among others, is generally considered the most revered living Czech author. It's easy to see why. As this novel (originally published in Czech in 1964) plays around with Czech history, juxtaposing the public life of the country with the private life of the narrator, Hrabal displays abounding energy and a rambunctious wit." Howard Norman of the Los Angeles Times wrote that it "stands up to the best of Hrabal", and argued that his novels "distill complicated human behavior to its basic--albeit at times repugnant, at times joyful--motivations".

== See also ==
- 1964 in literature
- Czech literature
- Angel Down (novel)
- Ducks, Newburyport
- The Gates of Paradise (novel)
