= My Sweet Little Village =

1985 Czechoslovak film

- Theatrical release poster
- Vesničko má středisková
- Directed by: Jiří Menzel
- Written by: Zdeněk Svěrák
- Produced by: Zbyněk Hloch
- Starring: János Bán; Marián Labuda; Rudolf Hrušínský; Petr Čepek; Libuše Šafránková; Jan Hartl
- Cinematography: Jaromír Šofr
- Edited by: Jiří Brožek
- Music by: Jiří Šust
- Distributed by: Ústřední půjčovna filmů
- Release date: 1985
- Running time: 98 minutes
- Country: Czechoslovakia
- Language: Czech

My Sweet Little Village (Czech: Vesničko má středisková) is a 1985 Czechoslovak film directed by Jiří Menzel. In 1987 it was nominated for an Academy Award for Best Foreign Language Film.

== Plot ==
The film's main storyline follows the life of Otík, a young man with mental illness, in a tight-knit village community. The sweet-tempered Otík works as a truck driver assistant to Mr. Pávek, his older colleague, and practical-minded neighbor. Pávek's family and Otík's aunt Hrabětová take care of Otík, whose parents are dead. However, the two truck coworkers become at odds over Otík's inability to perform even the simplest tasks. Pávek demands that Otík be transferred to assist another driver, who happens to be a choleric and suspicious man named Turek. Rather than work with Turek, Otík decides to accept an offer of employment in Prague but finds he does not fit into city life. After discovering that the transfer of Otík to Prague was a trick by a crooked subordinate of the Dřevoplech company director to get a deal on Otík's large inherited house for his boss, Pávek agrees to give Otík a second chance and retrieves him from the city to resume their work together.

The film also follows several subplots, such as the secret romance of Turek's wife with a young veterinarian, the tribulations of an accident-prone but respected doctor who has almost as much trouble with his pessimistic patients as he does with his car, and the desperate deeds of Pávek's teenage son, who has ardent feelings for an attractive local teacher.

== Cast ==
- János Bán as Ota Rákosník
- Marián Labuda as Karel Pávek
- Rudolf Hrušínský as Dr. Skružný
- Petr Čepek as Josef Turek
- Libuše Šafránková as Jana Turková
- Jan Hartl as Václav Kašpar
- Miloslav Štibich as Vojtěch Kalina
- Oldřich Vlach as Jaromír Kunc
- Milada Ježková as Ludmila Hrabětová
- Zdeněk Svěrák as Painter Evžen Ryba
- Josef Somr as Director of Dřevoplech

== Reception ==
In the Czech Republic and Slovakia the movie retains a cult following. It's also popular in Hungary where main actor János Bán is from. The movie gained favorable reviews from movie critics, with Roger Ebert awarding the movie 3 and a half stars out of 4. "In My Sweet Little Village, (Menzel) discovers some of the same gentle, ironic humor that Forman found in The Fireman's Ball. He uses everyday life as an instrument for a subtle attack on bureaucracy and a cheerful assertion of human nature. This movie is joyful from beginning to end – a small treasure, but a real one."

== Production ==
The film was made on location in the village of Křečovice, with some scenes in Prague.

== Awards ==
- 1986 Montreal World Film Festival – won Special Jury Award and Prize of the Ecumenical Jury
- 1987 Paris Film Festival – won Best Actor award

== See also ==
- List of submissions to the 59th Academy Awards for Best Foreign Language Film
- List of Czechoslovak submissions for the Academy Award for Best Foreign Language Film
