= Hradištko (Nymburk District) =

- Municipality
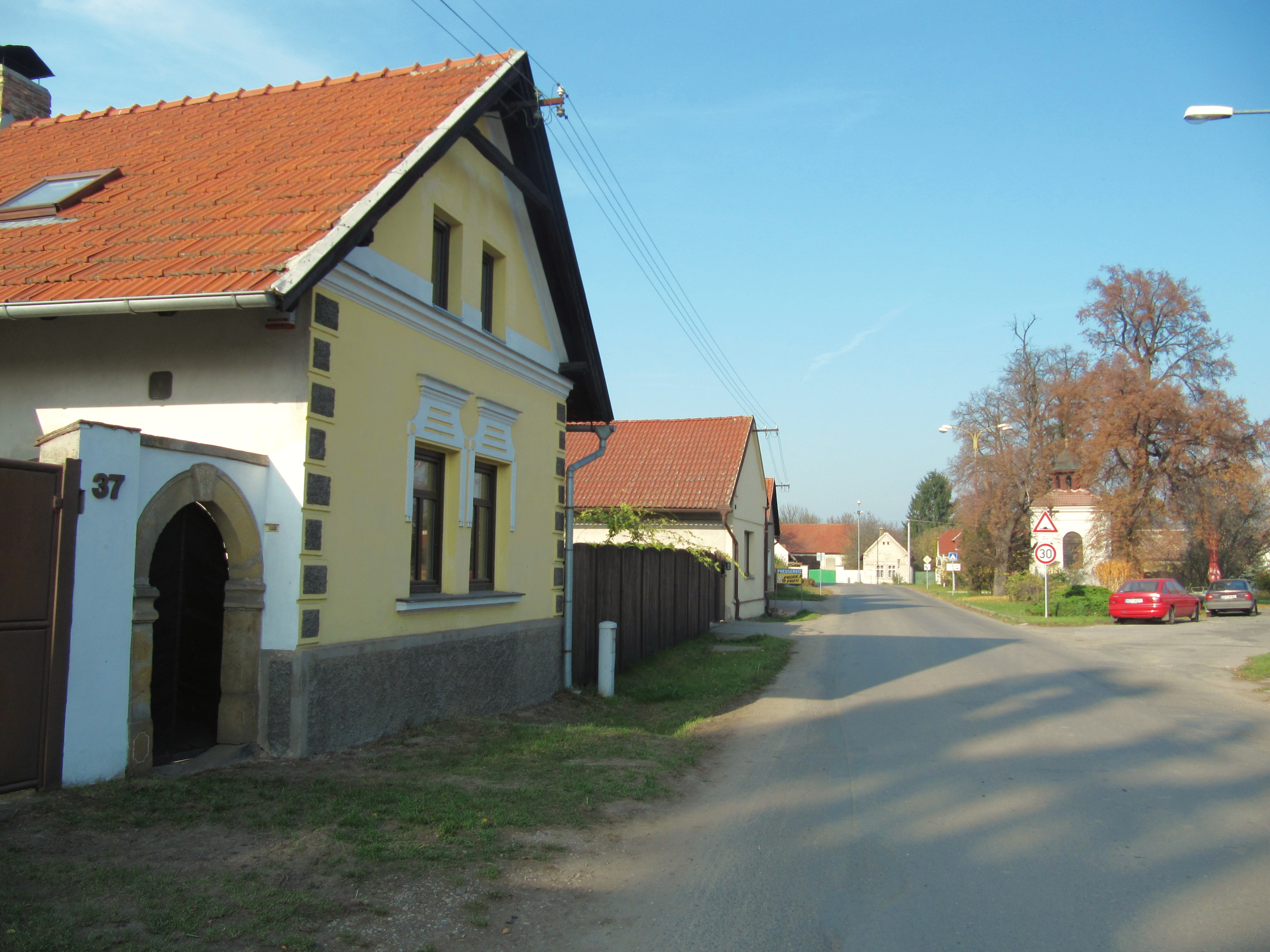
- Centre of Hradištko

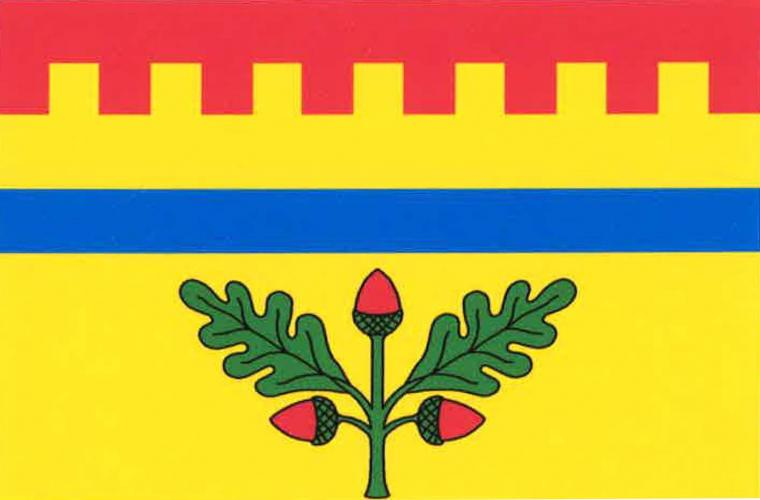
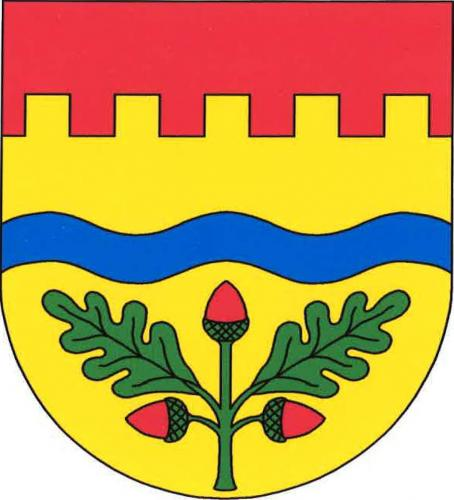
- Flag Coat of arms

- Location in the Czech Republic
- Coordinates: 50°9′56″N 14°56′6″E
- Country: Czech Republic
- Region: Central Bohemian
- District: Nymburk
- First mentioned: 1088

Area
  - Total: 18.23 km^{2} (7.04 sq mi)
- Elevation: 187 m (614 ft)

Population (2026-01-01)
  - Total: 948
  - Density: 52.0/km^{2} (135/sq mi)
- Time zone: UTC+1 (CET)
  - Summer (DST): UTC+2 (CEST)
- Postal code: 289 12
- Website: www.hradistko-kersko.cz

Hradištko (until 1969 Hradišťko) is a municipality and village in Nymburk District in the Central Bohemian Region of the Czech Republic. It has about 900 inhabitants. It includes the hamlet of Kersko, which is known as home and inspiration of writer Bohumil Hrabal.

== Etymology ==
The name is a diminutive of the Czech word hradiště, meaning 'gord', but formerly denoting any place where a castle (Czech: hrad) stood. In 1969, the municipality was renamed from Hradišťko to Hradištko.

== Geography ==
Hradištko is located about 7 kilometres (4 mi) southwest of Nymburk and 30 km (19 mi) east of Prague. It lies in the Central Elbe Table lowland within the Polabí region. The highest point is at 233 m (764 ft) above sea level. The municipality is situated on the left bank of the Elbe River. An administratively inseparable part of Hradištko is the hamlet of Kersko.

== History ==
The first written mention of Hradištko is in Chronica Boemorum and related to the year 1088, when King Vratislaus II donated the village to the newly established Vyšehrad Chapter. In 1345, King John of Bohemia donated the village to Hynek of Lichtenburk as part of the Sadská estate. From 1495, Hradištko was a royal property again.

The predecessor of Kersko was a village called Kří. The first written mention of Kří is in the foundation deed of the Břevnov Monastery from 993, when it was an uninhabited, bounded piece of land. The village was later founded here. The next mention of the village dates back to 1356. In 1420, the village was completedy destroyed and disappeared.

== Demographics ==
Historical population

Year	Pop.	±%
1869	451	—
1880	453	+0.4%
1890	459	+1.3%
1900	514	+12.0%
1910	527	+2.5%

Year	Pop.	±%
1921	504	−4.4%
1930	501	−0.6%
1950	618	+23.4%
1961	691	+11.8%
1970	602	−12.9%

Year	Pop.	±%
1980	521	−13.5%
1991	466	−10.6%
2001	427	−8.4%
2011	557	+30.4%
2021	813	+46.0%

Source: Censuses

== Transport ==
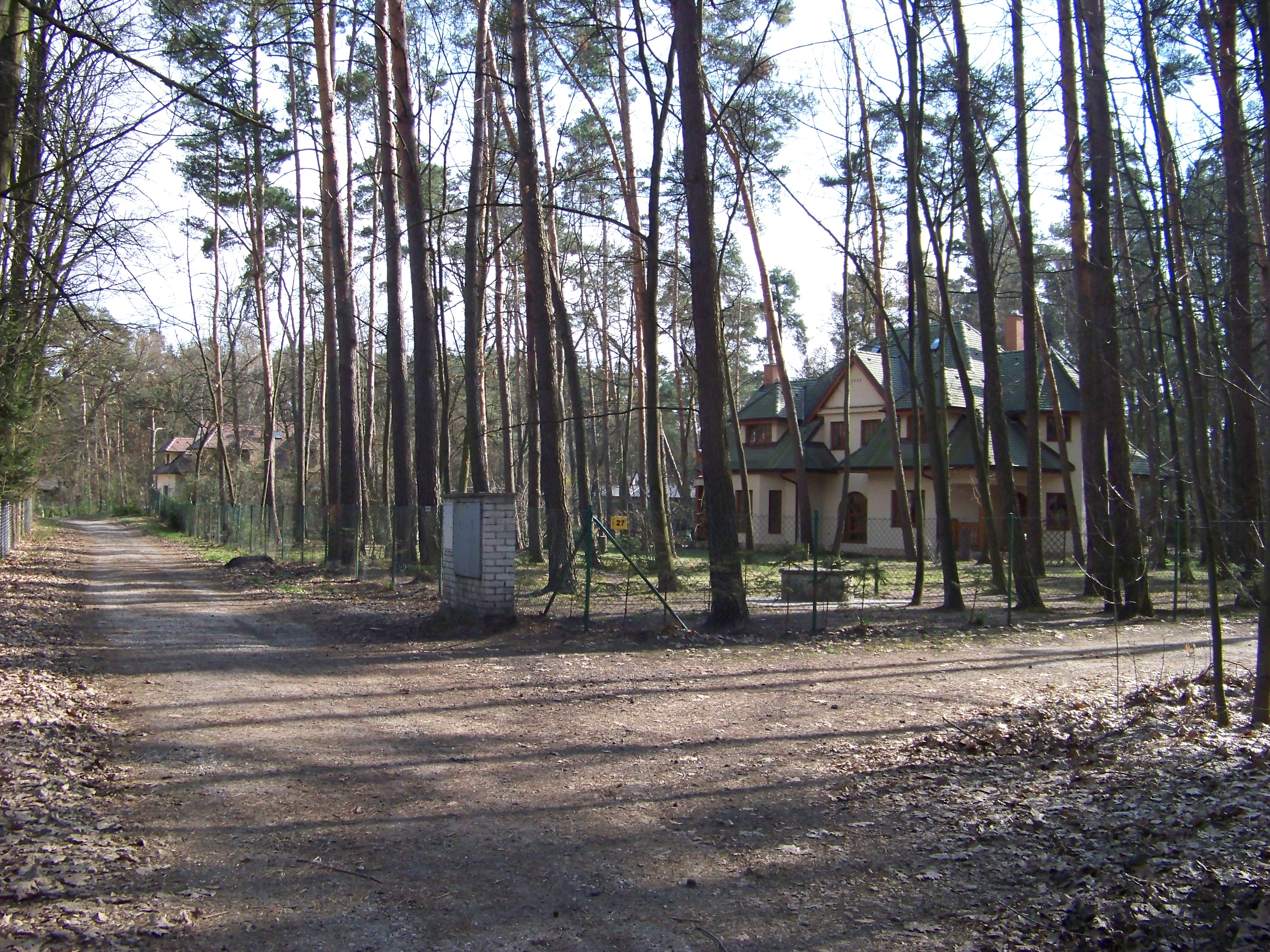
Scattered houses in Kersko

The D11 motorway (part of the European route E67) from Prague to Hradec Králové runs through the southern part of the municipality.

== Sights ==
There are two protected cultural monuments in the municipality, both archaeological sites. The first is the field remains and fortifications of the village of Kří, and the second is the remains of a church that was demolished in 1789.

== Notable people ==
- Bohumil Hrabal (1914–1997), writer; lived, worked here and is buried here
