= Pearls of the Deep =

- Theatrical release poster
- Directed by: Jiří Menzel; Jan Němec; Evald Schorm; Věra Chytilová; Jaromil Jireš
- Based on: Short stories by Bohumil Hrabal
- Cinematography: Jaroslav Kučera
- Edited by: Miloslav Hájek; Jiřina Lukešová
- Music by: Jan Klusák; Jiří Šust
- Release date: 7 January 1966
- Running time: 105 minutes
- Country: Czechoslovakia
- Language: Czech

Pearls of the Deep (Czech: Perličky na dně) is a 1966 Czechoslovak anthology film directed by Jiří Menzel, Jan Němec, Evald Schorm, Věra Chytilová and Jaromil Jireš. The five segments are all based on short stories by Bohumil Hrabal. The film was released in Czechoslovakia on 7 January 1966.

The film was received as a manifesto for the new generation of Czechoslovak filmmakers, and thus became closely associated with the Czechoslovak New Wave.

== Plot ==
- The Death of Mr Balthazar (Smrt pana Baltazara), directed by Jiří Menzel - A couple take their elderly father to watch the motorcycle races. The wife has perfect pitch and can identify motorcycles by the sound of their engine. They all get very drunk and meet a man who lost his legs in a motorcycle accident. Together they discuss the deaths of their favorite motorcyclists in auto accidents. The race begins and a motorcyclist named Balthazar crashes and dies. The man with no legs remarks he hates how that always happens near him when he goes to a motorcycling event. The couple and their father leave and the father discusses his favorite beer manufactured in Munich.
- Imposters (Podvodníci), directed by Jan Němec- Two old men who are about to die construct false biographies for themselves. One man claims to have been a successful opera singer and the other a successful journalist.
- House of Joy (Dům radosti), directed by Evald Schorm - Two insurance agents visit an eccentric painter and goat farmer and his mother.
- At the World Cafeteria (Automat Svět), directed by Věra Chytilová- A wedding reception takes place at a diner. The guests are able to stay oblivious of the surrounding misery.
- Romance, directed by Jaromil Jireš - A working-class boy becomes infatuated with a Roma girl.

== Cast ==
"The Death of Mr Balthazar"

- Pavla Marsálková as Matka
- Ferdinand Krůta as Otec František
- Alois Vachek as Mrzák
- Emil Iserle as Stryc
- Miroslav Nohýnek as Chlapec
- Vlasta Spánková as Dívka
- Jiří Menzel as Bicyclist

"Imposters"

- Miloš Čtrnáctý as Zpěvák
- František Havel as Novinář
- Josef Hejl as Holič
- Jan Vašák as Zřízenec
- Jiří Reichl as Boy with fracture

"House of Joy"

- Josefa Pechlatová as Matka
- Václav Žák as Malíř
- Ivan Vyskočil as Uředník
- Antonín Pokorny as Uředník

"At the World Cafeteria"

- Věra Mrázková as Nevesta
- Vladimír Boudník as Vytvarník
- Alžběta Laštovková as Výčepní
- Václav Chochola as SNB
- Jan Vala as Cock
- Aleš Košnar as Mládenec
- Bohumil Hrabal as Bohumil Hrabal

"Romance"

- Dana Valtová as Gypsy girl
- Ivan Vyskočil as Gaston
- Karel Jeřábek as Hlídač
- František Příhoda as Watcher

== The Junk Shop ==
Juraj Herz originally made his short film The Junk Shop to be included in this movie, but it was omitted due to the running time.
