= Cutting It Short =

1980 Czechoslovak comedy film

- Directed by: Jiří Menzel
- Written by: Jiří Menzel; Bohumil Hrabal
- Cinematography: Jaromír Šofr
- Edited by: Jiří Brožek
- Release dates: 1 February 1981 (Czechoslovakia); October 1983 (U.S.)
- Running time: 93 minutes
- Country: Czechoslovakia
- Language: Czech
- Budget: 4,000,000 koruna

Cutting It Short (also released as Shortcuts) (Czech: Postřižiny - literally: First haircut) is a 1980 Czechoslovak comedy film directed by Jiří Menzel. It is based on the novel Postřižiny by Czech writer Bohumil Hrabal. The story is set in a brewery in a Czech small town.

The film is an evocation of the childhood memories of Bohumil Hrabal in his provincial town of Nymburk, dominated by the local brewery. The main actors of the film, uncle Pepin and Maryška, are based on real family members of Hrabal: Maryška on his mother and uncle Pepin on his real uncle, who came to stay two weeks in the town but remained for forty years. His spontaneous stories influenced much of Hrabal's literary work.

The film was entered into the main competition at the 38th edition of the Venice Film Festival.

According to the film critic and historian Peter Hames, Cutting It Short, which frequently quotes or refers to silent comedy, is one of the best post-Tati comedies.

Theodor Pištěk designed the costumes for the film.

== Cast ==
- Magda Vášáryová as Maryška
- Jiří Schmitzer as Francin
- Jaromír Hanzlík as Pepin
- Rudolf Hrušínský (II) as Dr. Gruntorád
- Petr Čepek as Mr. de Giorgi (board member)
- Oldřich Vlach as Ruzicka
- František Řehák as Mr. Vejvoda
- Miloslav Štibich as Mr. Bernádek
- Alois Liškutín as Sefl
- Pavel Vondruška as Mr. Lustig
- Rudolf Hrušínský (III) as scrub
- Miroslav Donutil as stable boy
- Oldřich Vízner as Boda Cervinka
