= I Served the King of England (film) =

2006 Czech comedy film

- Theatrical release poster
- Directed by: Jiří Menzel
- Screenplay by: Jiří Menzel
- Based on: I Served the King of England by Bohumil Hrabal
- Produced by: Rudolf Biermann
- Starring: Ivan Barnev; Oldřich Kaiser; Julia Jentsch; Martin Huba; Marián Labuda; Milan Lasica; Zuzana Fialová; Josef Abrhám
- Cinematography: Jaromír Šofr
- Edited by: Jiří Brožek
- Music by: Aleš Březina
- Distributed by: Bioscop
- Release date: 19 December 2006
- Running time: 120 minutes
- Countries: Czech Republic; Slovakia
- Language: Czech
- Budget: CZK84.45 million (US$3.2 million)
- Box office: $7.3 million

I Served the King of England (Czech: Obsluhoval jsem anglického krále) is a 2006 Czech historical comedy film written and directed by Jiří Menzel, based on Bohumil Hrabal's novel I Served the King of England. It is Menzel's sixth Hrabal adaptation for film.

The film was released in the United Kingdom and the United States in 2008.

== Plot ==
Jan Dítě has been released from a Czech prison three months before the end of his 15-year sentence and is settling in a town near the border between Czechoslovakia and Germany. He occupies his time by rebuilding a deserted house, and begins to recall his past, saying his main wish in life was to become a millionaire. Jan begins his career as a frankfurter vendor at a railroad station, and quickly learns the power of money and the influence it exerts on people.

At one point during his reminiscences, a young woman, Marcela, and her older traveling companion, a professor, settle in the area. Jan and Marcela develop a mutual attraction, though it remains unconsummated. The film continues to alternate between past and present, as the relationship between the older Jan and the new neighbors develops.

In the restaurant, the younger Jan has a number of affairs with various women, including an actress and a prostitute at a brothel. He also gets increasingly prestigious jobs, including a stint at a spa, the Hotel Tichota, where he has an affair with a maid. Eventually Jan finds employment in Prague at the Hotel Paříž, where he falls under the tutelage of the Maître d', Skřivánek, who claims that he once served the King of England. Eventually, Jan serves the Emperor of Ethiopia on one occasion. The Emperor tries to award Skřivánek a medal, but is too short to place the award around Skřivánek's neck. Jan is short enough for the Emperor to reach, and maneuvers to receive the medal in Skřivánek's place.

With the Third Reich's annexation of Czechoslovakia, Jan falls in love with Liza, a young Sudeten German woman who worships Adolf Hitler. She agrees to marry him only after he proves that he is of pure Aryan descent through medical examination. During the occupation, the other waiters and the hotel manager, Brandejs, express their contempt for the German occupiers by being as unhelpful as possible in their service to them. Jan is the only member of the waitstaff not to express such symbolic resistance. For this reason, Brandejs dismisses Jan, and says Jan will be blacklisted from employment in any Prague establishment. When Jan and Liza later appear as patrons, and Jan tells Skřivánek that serving the King of England has done him no good, Skřivánek pours food over Jan in protest. Soon, the occupying authorities take Skřivánek away and he is never seen again.

During World War II, Jan works in an institute, formerly the Hotel Tichota, where German women reside to breed a new "master race" with selected soldiers. Because the owner, Mr Tichota, uses a wheelchair, he has been displaced as its owner and is never seen again. In the meantime, Liza serves as a nurse on the Russian front. She returns with valuable stamps taken from the homes of Polish-Jewish families. As the war progresses and the tide turns against Germany, the women are displaced from the facility, and wounded and amputee soldiers replace them. Near the war's end, the facility is attacked, and the soldiers and staff evacuated. Liza tries to retrieve the stamps from the burning building, but dies when its roof collapses on her. Jan finds her body holding the box of stamps and pries it from her hands. After the war, the stamps' value allows Jan to become a wealthy hotelier on the same premises.

After the Communists take power in Czechoslovakia in 1948, Jan loses his property and wealth when he tells the Communist resistance that he himself is a millionaire. He is sentenced to prison for 15 years: one year for each of his millions. In prison, he sees that Brandejs and other formerly wealthy customers are prisoners. Jan tries to sit among them, but they exclude him from their circle.

Marcela and the professor leave the area. Jan completes the restoration of his home and releases the stamps by letting the winds blow them into the valley.

== Cast ==
- Ivan Barnev as Jan Dítě, as a young man
- Oldřich Kaiser as Jan Dítě, as an older man
- Julia Jentsch as Liza
- Martin Huba as Skřivánek
- Marián Labuda as Walden
- Milan Lasica as Professor
- Zuzana Fialová as Marcela
- Josef Abrhám as Brandejs
- Jaromír Dulava as Karel
- Pavel Nový as General
- István Szabó as stock marketeer
- Petra Hřebíčková as Jaruška

== Critical reception ==
I Served the King of England received generally positive reviews from critics. As of 19 June 2025, the review aggregator Rotten Tomatoes reported that 79% of critics rated the film positively based on 87 reviews, with an average rating of 7.2/10. The website's critical consensus reads, "With charm and an eye for life's bittersweet moments, Czech New Wave master Jiri Menzel paints a picaresque story with whimsy and intellect." Metacritic reported the film had an average score of 72 out of 100 based on 26 reviews, indicating "generally favorable reviews".

The film appeared on some critics' top ten lists of the best films of 2008. Peter Rainer of The Christian Science Monitor named it the sixth-best film of 2008, and Dennis Harvey of Variety named it the eighth-best. It received the Gopo Award for Best European Film in 2009, meaning it was the European film that had the greatest box office success in Romania in 2008.
