= Larks on a String =

- Directed by: Jiří Menzel
- Written by: Jiří Menzel, based on the novel by Bohumil Hrabal
- Cinematography: Jaromír Šofr
- Music by: Jiří Šust
- Distributed by: IFEX (US theatrical)
- Release dates: 1990 (Czech Republic); 13 February 1991 (New York City only)
- Running time: 96 minutes
- Country: Czechoslovakia
- Language: Czech

Larks on a String (Czech: Skřivánci na niti) is a 1969 Czech film directed by Jiří Menzel. The film was banned by the Czechoslovak government, but was later released in 1990 after the fall of the Communist regime. It tells the stories of various characters considered bourgeois by Czechoslovakia's communist government in the 1950s, who have been forced to work in a junkyard for the purposes of re-education. It won the Golden Bear at the 40th Berlin International Film Festival.

== Cast ==
- Rudolf Hrušínský as Trustee
- Vlastimil Brodský as Professor
- Václav Neckář as Pavel Hvezdár
- Jitka Zelenohorská as Jitka
- Jaroslav Satoranský as Guard Andel
- Vladimír Šmeral as Minister
- Ferdinand Krůta as Kudla
- František Řehák as Drobecek
- Leoš Suchařípa as Public prosecutor
- Vladimír Ptáček as Mlíkar
- Eugen Jegorov as Saxophonist (as Evžen Jegorov)
- Naďa Urbánková as Lenka
- Věra Křesadlová as Convict
- Věra Ferbasová as Convict
- Jiřina Štěpničková as Pavel's mother
