= Jiří Menzel =

Czech film director (1938–2020)

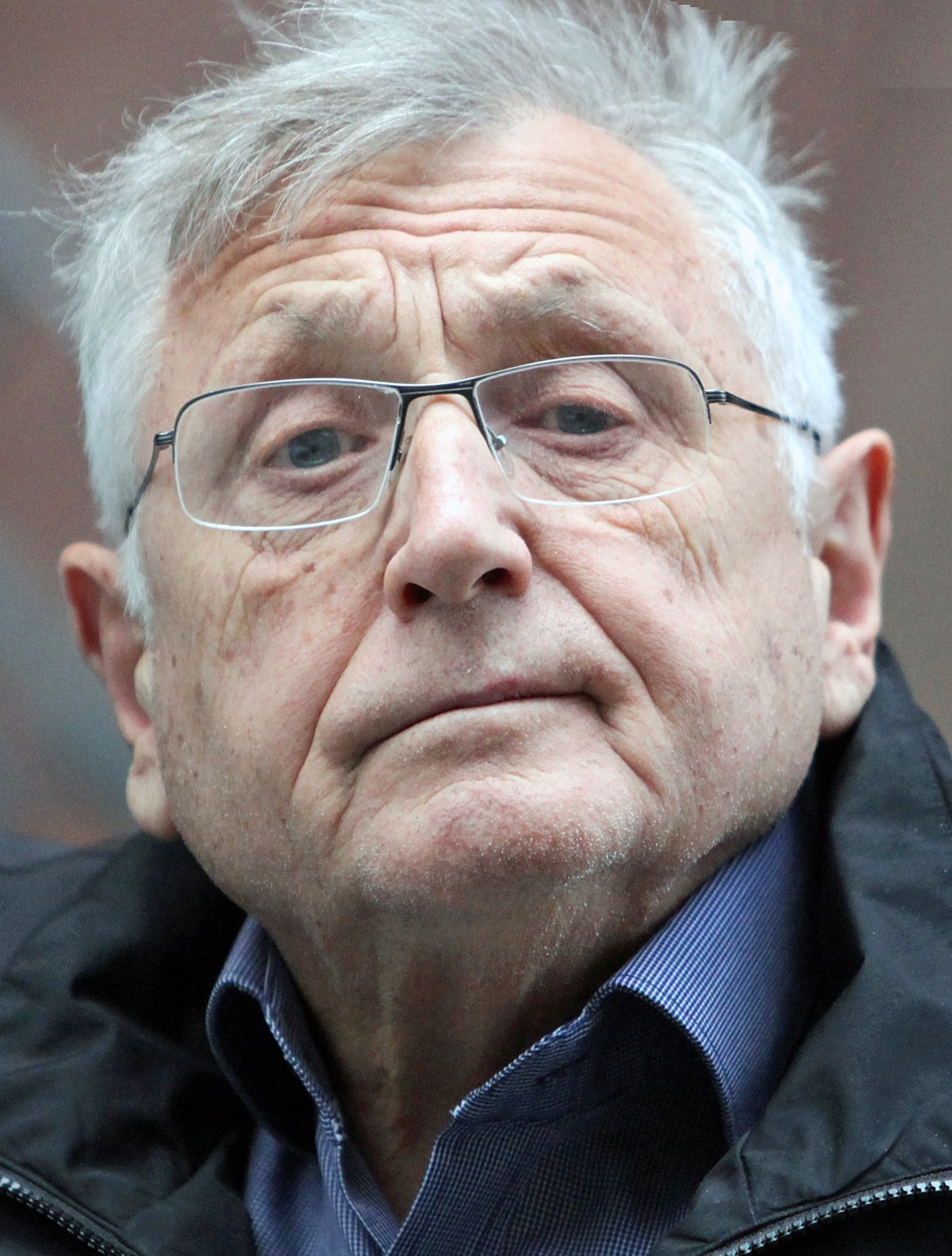
- Jiří Menzel in 2016
- Born: 23 February 1938; Prague, Czechoslovakia
- Died: 5 September 2020 (aged 82); Prague, Czech Republic
- Occupation: Film director
- Spouse: Olga Menzelová

Jiří Menzel (Czech: [ˈjɪr̝iː ˈmɛntsl̩]) (23 February 1938 – 5 September 2020) was a Czech film director, theatre director, actor, and screenwriter. His films often combine a humanistic view of the world with sarcasm and provocative cinematography. Some of these films are adapted from works by Czech writers such as Bohumil Hrabal and Vladislav Vančura.

== Early life ==
Menzel was born in Prague in 1938 to Josef Menzel and Božena Jindřichová. His father Josef was a journalist, translator and children's book writer. Menzel studied directing at the Film and TV School of the Academy of Performing Arts in Prague (FAMU) in Prague. His teachers at the academy included Czech Director Otakar Vávra.

== Career ==
Menzel was a member of the Czech New Wave cinema in the 1960s. His first feature film, Closely Watched Trains, won the Academy Award for Best Foreign Language Film in 1967. The film was a World War II drama based on a book by Bohumil Hrabal. His film Larks on a String was filmed in 1969, but was banned by the government censors. It was finally released in 1990 after the fall of the Communist regime. The film won the Golden Bear at the 40th Berlin International Film Festival in 1990. The film was also based on a book by Bohumil Hrabal, and spoke about life in a re-education camp in Czechoslovakia under the communist rule in the 1950s.

Menzel was nominated for an Academy Award for Best Foreign Language Film again in 1986 with his dark comedy My Sweet Little Village. In 1987, he was a member of the jury at the 37th Berlin International Film Festival. In 1989, he was a member of the jury at the 16th Moscow International Film Festival. In 1995, he was a member of the jury at the 19th Moscow International Film Festival. He was awarded an IIFA Lifetime Achievement Award in November 2013. He was also awarded the French title of Knight of Arts and Letters and the Czech Lion for lifetime artistic contribution.

In the 1980s, he was offered the chance by a West German television studio to make a television series version of The Good Soldier Švejk with Rudolf Hrušínský. He didn't get the permission from the Czechoslovak government, however.

His last appearance in a feature film was in the 2018 Slovak film The Interpreter, which was based on the story of a man's interactions with an SS soldier who had executed his parents. The film was Slovakia's official entry to the Oscars.

== Death ==
Menzel died on 5 September 2020, aged 82, after battling a prolonged illness. He had undergone a brain surgery earlier in 2017. He is survived by his wife Olga Menzelová, and daughters, Anna Karolina and Eva Maria. Menzel's wife confirmed on 9 November 2020 that Menzel died as a result of COVID-19 pneumonia.

== Filmography ==
=== As a director ===
Year	English title	Original title	Notes
1960	Prefabricated Houses	Domy z panelů	School film
1963	Our Mr. Foerster Died	Umřel nám pan Foerster	School film
1963	Something Different	O něčem jiném	assistant director
1965	Concert '65	Koncert 65	Short documentary
1965	Crime at the Girls School	Zločin v dívčí škole	Segment "Crime at the Girls School", also screenwriter
1966	Pearls of the Deep	Perličky na dně	Segment "Smrt pana Baltazara" (The Death of Mr. Balthazar), also screenwriter
1966	Closely Watched Trains	Ostře sledované vlaky	also screenwriter, Academy Award winner
1968	Crime in a Music Hall	Zločin v šantánu	also screenwriter
1968	Capricious Summer	Rozmarné léto	also screenwriter
1969	Larks on a String	Skřivánci na niti	also screenwriter, banned and not released until 1990
1974	Altered Landscapes	Proměny krajiny	Short documentary
1974	Who Looks for Gold?	Kdo hledá zlaté dno	also screenwriter
1976	Seclusion Near a Forest	Na samotě u lesa	
1978	Those Wonderful Movie Cranks	Báječní muži s klikou	also screenwriter
1980	Cutting It Short	Postřižiny	also screenwriter
1981	Tři v tom		TV theatre
1982	Krasosmutnění		TV film
1982	Dr. Johann Faust, Praha II., Karlovo nám. 40		TV theatre
1983	Best Wishes From Planet Earth	Srdečný pozdrav ze zeměkoule	
1984	The Snowdrop Festival	Slavnosti sněženek	also screenwriter
1985	My Sweet Little Village	Vesničko má středisková	Nominated for Academy Award
1986	Chocolate Cop	Die Schokoladenschnüffler	
1989	The End of Old Times	Konec starých časů	also screenwriter
1991	Audience		TV film
1991	Beggar's Opera	Žebrácká opera	also screenwriter
1993	Life and Extraordinary Adventures of Private Ivan Chonkin	Život a neobyčejná dobrodružství vojáka Ivana Čonkina	Nominated for 8 Czech Lion Awards
1998	Jacobowski a plukovník		TV theatre
2002	Ten Minutes Older		Segment "One Moment"
2006	I Served the King of England	Obsluhoval jsem anglického krále	also screenwriter, nominated for 11 Czech Lion Awards, won 5
2013	The Don Juans	Donšajni	also screenwriter

=== As an actor ===
- Strop (Short film) (1962)
- Place in the Crowd (1964)
- Obžalovaný (1964)
- Courage for Every Day (1964)
- If a Thousand Clarinets (1965)
- Pension pro svobodné pány (TV Movie) (1965)
- Pearls of the Deep (1965)
- Nobody Will Laugh (1965)
- Searching (1966)
- Volejte Martina (1966)
- Closely Watched Trains (1966)
- Flám (1966)
- Return of the Prodigal Son (1967)
- Hotel for Strangers (1967)
- Private Hurricane (1967)
- Dita Saxová (1968)
- Capricious Summer (1968)
- Crime in a Music Hall (1968)
- The Cremator (1969)
- Larks on a String (1969)
- Nevěsta (1970)
- Straw Hat (1972)
- Sechse kommen durch die Welt (1972, voiced by Eberhard Esche)
- Thirty Maidens and Pythagoras (1973)
- The Apple Game (1976)
- Modrá planeta (1977)
- The Woman Across the Way (1978)
- Those Wonderful Movie Cranks (1979)
- Every Wednesday (1979)
- Hra na telo (1979)
- Koportos (1980)
- Bulldogs and Cherries (1981)
- Tale of the Little Quarter (TV Movie) (1981)
- Szívzür (1982)
- Ferat Vampire (1982)
- Švédská zápalka (TV Movie) (1982)
- Babička se zbláznila (TV Movie) (1982)
- Srdečný pozdrav ze zeměkoule (1983)
- Fandy, ó Fandy (1983)
- Sedm křížků (TV Movie) (1983)
- Felhöjáték (1984)
- Albert (TV Movie) (1985)
- Run, He Is Coming! (1987)
- Dámská jízda (TV Movie) (1988)
- Stvoření světa (TV Movie) (1989)
- Zvláštní bytosti (1990)
- Něžný barbar (1990)
- Martha and I (1990)
- Zvonokosy (TV Movie) (1990)
- Pražský student (TV Mini-Series) (1990)
- The Elementary School (1991)
- Das lange Gespräch mit dem Vogel (TV Movie) (1992)
- The Little Apocalypse (1993)
- Všetko čo mám rád (1993)
- Joint Venture (1994)
- Revenge (1995)
- How to Deserve a Princess (1995)
- Too Loud a Solitude (1996)
- Truck Stop (1996)
- Drákulův švagr (TV Mini-Series) (1996)
- Franciska vasárnapjai (1997)
- Hospoda (TV Series) (1996-1997)
- All My Loved Ones (1999)
- Zimní víla (TV Movie) (1999)
- When Grandpa Loved Rita Hayworth (2000)
- The Sunken Cemetery (2002)
- Útěk do Budína (2002)
- Világszám! (2004)
- Rokonok (2006)
- Teddy Bear (2007)
- A bárány utolsó megkísértése (TV Movie) (2008)
- Setkání v Praze, s vraždou (TV Movie) (2009)
- Operation Dunaj (2009)
- Wonderful Times (TV Series) (2009)
- The Door (2012)
- Head Over Heels(TV Series) (2012–14)
- The Interpreter (2018)

== See also ==
- CzechMate: In Search of Jiří Menzel
- List of Czech Academy Award winners and nominees
