= List of submissions to the 38th Academy Awards for Best Foreign Language Film =

1965 Best Foreign Language Film submissions

Highlights
- Oscar winner: (Czechoslovakia) The Shop on Main Street
- Submissions: 15
- Debuts: 1

This is a list of submissions to the 38th Academy Awards for Best Foreign Language Film. The Academy Award for Best Foreign Language Film was created in 1956 by the Academy of Motion Picture Arts and Sciences to honour non-English-speaking films produced outside the United States. The award is handed out annually, and is accepted by the winning film's director, although it is considered an award for the submitting country as a whole. Countries are invited by the Academy to submit their best films for competition according to strict rules, with only one film being accepted from each country.

For the 38th Academy Awards, fifteen films were submitted in the category Academy Award for Best Foreign Language Film. Hungary submitted a film to the competition for the first time. The five nominated films came from Czechoslovakia, Greece, Italy, Japan and Sweden.

Czechoslovakia won for the first time with The Shop on Main Street by Ján Kadár and Elmar Klos, which was also nominated for Best Actress (Ida Kamińska) in the subsequent ceremony (39th Academy Awards). With its win, Czechoslovakia became the first Eastern Bloc country to win an Academy Award, during the peak of the Cold War.

== Submissions ==
Submitting country	Film title used in nomination	Original title	Language(s)	Director(s)	Result
Argentina	Pajarito Gómez	Pajarito Gómez	Spanish	Rodolfo Kuhn	Not nominated
Brazil	Sao Paulo Incorporated	São Paulo, Sociedade Anônima	Brazilian Portuguese	Luis Sérgio Person	Not nominated
Czechoslovakia	The Shop on Main Street	Obchod na korze	Slovak, Yiddish	Ján Kadár & Elmar Klos	Won Academy Award
Denmark	Gertrud		Danish	Carl Theodor Dreyer	Not nominated
Egypt	The Impossible	المستحيل	Arabic	Hussein Kamal	Not nominated
France	Pierrot le Fou		French, English	Jean-Luc Godard	Not nominated
West Germany	It		German	Ulrich Schamoni	Not nominated
Greece	Blood on the Land	Το χώμα βάφτηκε κόκκινο	Greek	Vasilis Georgiadis	Nominated
Hungary	Twenty Hours	Húsz óra	Hungarian	Zoltán Fábri	Not nominated
India	Guide	गाइड	Hindi	Vijay Anand	Not nominated
Israel	The Glass Cage	קלאב הזחוחית	French, Hebrew	Philippe Arthuys & Jean-Louis Levi-Alvarès	Not nominated
Italy	Marriage Italian-Style	Matrimonio all'italiana	Italian, Neapolitan	Vittorio De Sica	Nominated
Japan	Kwaidan	怪談	Japanese	Masaki Kobayashi	Nominated
Mexico	Always Further On	Tarahumara (Cada vez más lejos)	Spanish, Rarámuri	Luis Alcoriza	Not nominated
Spain	La Tía Tula		Spanish	Miguel Picazo	Not nominated
Sweden	Dear John	Käre John	Swedish	Lars-Magnus Lindgren	Nominated

== Sources ==
- Margaret Herrick Library, Academy of Motion Picture Arts and Sciences
