= List of Czechoslovak submissions for the Academy Award for Best Foreign Language Film =

Best International Feature Film submissions from Czechoslovakia

Highlights
- Debut: 1964
- Submissions: 23
- Nominations: 6
- Oscar winners: 2
- Final submission: 1991

Czechoslovakia submitted films for the Academy Award for Best Foreign Language Film (Note: The category was renamed to the Academy Award for Best International Feature Film in April 2019, after the Academy deemed the word "Foreign" to be outdated.) between 1964 and 1991 before splitting into the independent Czechia and Slovakia republics in 1993. The award is handed out annually by the United States Academy of Motion Picture Arts and Sciences to a feature-length motion picture produced outside the United States that contains primarily non-English dialogue.

Czechoslovak films received six nominations, two of them won the award: The Shop on Main Street and Closely Watched Trains, both of which are black-comedies set during World War II.

After the breakup of Czechoslovakia, Czechia and Slovakia both began submitting films to the competition regularly. Since then, Czechia has gotten three nominations and one win for Jan Svěrák's Kolya.

== Submissions ==
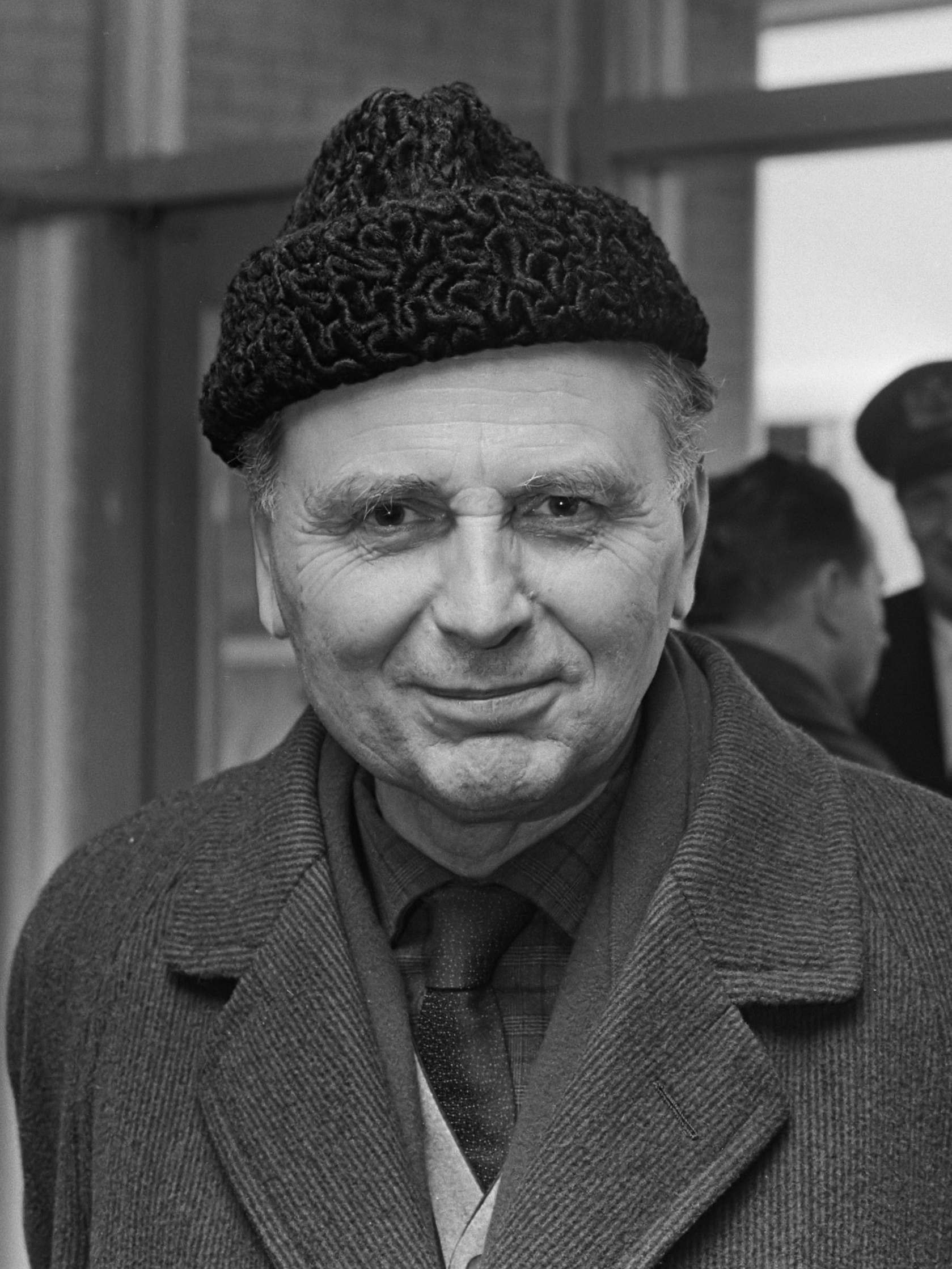
Elmar Klos, with Ján Kadár, directed the first Czechoslovak film to win the award, The Shop on Main Street.

The Academy of Motion Picture Arts and Sciences has invited the film industries of various countries to submit their best film for the Academy Award for Best Foreign Language Film since 1956. The Foreign Language Film Award Committee oversees the process and reviews all the submitted films. Following this, they vote via secret ballot to determine the five nominees for the award.

Miloš Forman had two of his films selected to represent Czechoslovakia in the 1960s, and both were nominated. Forman eventually won two Academy Award for Best Director after emigrating to exile in the United States.

Almost all submissions were primarily in Czech, although their 1982 and 1984 submissions were mainly in Slovak. Below is a list of the films that have been submitted by Czechoslovakia for review by the Academy for the award by the year of the submission and the respective Academy Award ceremony.

Year (Ceremony)	Film title used in nomination	Original title	Director(s)	Result
1964 (37th)	Lemonade Joe	Limonádový Joe	Oldřich Lipský	Not nominated
1965 (38th)	The Shop on Main Street	Obchod na korze	Ján Kadár and Elmar Klos	Won Academy Award
1966 (39th)	Loves of a Blonde	Lásky jedné plavovlásky	Miloš Forman	Nominated
1967 (40th)	Closely Watched Trains	Ostře sledované vlaky	Jiří Menzel	Won Academy Award
1968 (41st)	The Firemen's Ball	Hoří, má panenko	Miloš Forman	Nominated
1969 (42nd)	The Cremator	Spalovač mrtvol	Juraj Herz	Not nominated
1973 (46th)	Days of Betrayal	Dny zrady I	Otakar Vávra	Not nominated
1974 (47th)	Lovers in the Year One	Milenci v roce jedna	Jaroslav Balík	Not nominated
1975 (48th)	Circus in the Circus	Cirkus v cirkuse	Oldřich Lipský	Not nominated
1976 (49th)	One Silver Piece	Jeden stříbrný	Jaroslav Balík	Not nominated
1978 (51st)	Nick Carter in Prague	Adéla ještě nevečeřela	Oldřich Lipský	Not nominated
1979 (52nd)	Those Wonderful Men with a Crank	Báječní muži s klikou	Jiří Menzel	Not nominated
1980 (53rd)	Love Between the Raindrops	Lásky mezi kapkami deště	Karel Kachyňa	Not nominated
1981 (54th)	The Divine Emma	Božská Ema	Jiří Krejčík	Not nominated
1982 (55th)	The Assistant	Pomocník	Zoro Záhon	Not nominated
1983 (56th)	Incomplete Eclipse	Neúplné zatmění	Jaromil Jireš	Not nominated
1984 (57th)	The Millennial Bee	Tisícročná včela	Juraj Jakubisko	Not nominated
1985 (58th)	Scalpel, Please	Skalpel, prosím	Jiří Svoboda	Not nominated
1986 (59th)	My Sweet Little Village	Vesničko má středisková	Jiří Menzel	Nominated
1987 (60th)	Forbidden Dreams	Smrt krásných srnců	Karel Kachyňa	Not nominated
1989 (62nd)	Tainted Horseplay	Kopytem sem, kopytem tam	Věra Chytilová	Not nominated
1990 (63rd)	Vojtech, Called the Orphan	Vojtěch, řečený sirotek	Zdeněk Tyc	Not nominated
1991 (64th)	The Elementary School	Obecná škola	Jan Svěrák	Nominated

== See also ==
- List of Academy Award winners and nominees for Best International Feature Film
- List of Academy Award-winning foreign language films
- List of Czech submissions for the Academy Award for Best International Feature Film
- List of Slovak submissions for the Academy Award for Best International Feature Film
- Cinema of the Czechoslovakia
