= Ladislav Grosman =

Ladislav Grosman (4 February 1921 in Humenné – 25 January 1981 in Tel Aviv) was a Slovak novelist and screenwriter. He is best known for being the author of The Shop on Main Street (Obchod na korze), which he adapted into a critically acclaimed Academy Award-winning film in 1965. Grosman became proficient in Czech after he moved to Czechoslovakia's Czech-speaking part in his late twenties, where he worked as a correspondent and editor in the Prague bureau of the Slovak newspaper Pravda. Following the Warsaw Pact invasion of Czechoslovakia in 1968, he moved to Israel, where he died in 1981.

== Biography ==
Grosman was born to a Slovak Jewish family, the son of a tanner and owner of a small shop selling leather and belts. His parents and three of his five siblings were killed during a German bombing of Ružomberok in 1944. He attended the gymnasium in Michalovce from 1932-1939, but only graduated in 1945, after the end of World War II. After the establishment of the Slovak State he worked as a worker in a brick factory in Humenné, and was forced into military service without weapons (on racial grounds), and was eventually deported to a forced labor camp in Banská Bystrica. He worked as a digger, a laborer in a brick factory and in the tobacco fields, until the Slovak National Uprising, when he went into hiding.

Grosman returned to the liberated Humenné in March, 1945, but moved to Prague in September of that year. Graduating with an Engineer's degree from the Political and Social University in 1949, he subsequently found employment for three years as a book reviewer in the Slovak publishing house Pravda. He was a long term friend of writers Arnošt Lustig and Gabriel Laub. From 1953 to 1959 he worked as an editor in the publishing house Slovenská kniha (Slovak Book) and simultaneously he studied educational psychology at the Pedagogical University. He earned his PhD at Charles University in Prague. Initially, he wrote in Slovak, but in the mid-1950s he switched to Czech.

From 1960 to 1963 he was an editor in the Association of Czechoslovak Publishing Houses, and worked at the Barrandov Film Studios from 1965 until 1968, when he emigrated with his family to Israel and settled in Tel Aviv in the September. From January 1969 until his death he worked as a lecturer in Slavic literature and taught creative writing. He became a full professor at Bar-Ilan University near Tel Aviv in 1975, and taught screenwriting at the Tel Aviv University from 1979.

== Personal life ==
Grosman died in 1981 in Kiryat-Ono, Israel where he lived since the late 1960s. He was survived by his wife, Edith, and son, Jirka. A memorial plaque bearing his name was unveiled in Humenné in 2010.

== The Shop on Main Street ==
Grosman published the short story "The Trap" ("Past"), a precursor to the screenplay of Obchod na korze that contained three themes that made it into the final film, in Czech in 1962. He reworked and expanded this story, still in Czech, as a literary-narrative screenplay that was published in 1964 under the title "The Shop on Main Street" (Obchod na korze). This version contained what would become the film's storyline, but it was not in a typical (American) screenplay format. Grosman reworked it into a shooting script with Slovak dialogue in cooperation with the film's designated directors, Ján Kadár and Elmar Klos.

The film, which looks at Jewish life and Aryanization in Slovakia during World War II, was critically acclaimed, winning the Academy Award for Best Foreign Language Film at the 38th Academy Awards. Author Ewa Mazierska compares his work to Bohumil Hrabal in that his literary works typically contained the perfect mixture of comedy and tragedy.

== Selected works ==
- The Shop on Main Street (1965), English edition Karolinum Press 2019. ISBN 978-80-246-4022-8.
- The Bride (1969)
- Uncle David's Date (1969)
- To Fly with Broken Wings (1976)
- The Devil's Own Luck
