= List of awards and nominations received by Picket Fences =

List of awards won by Picket Fences
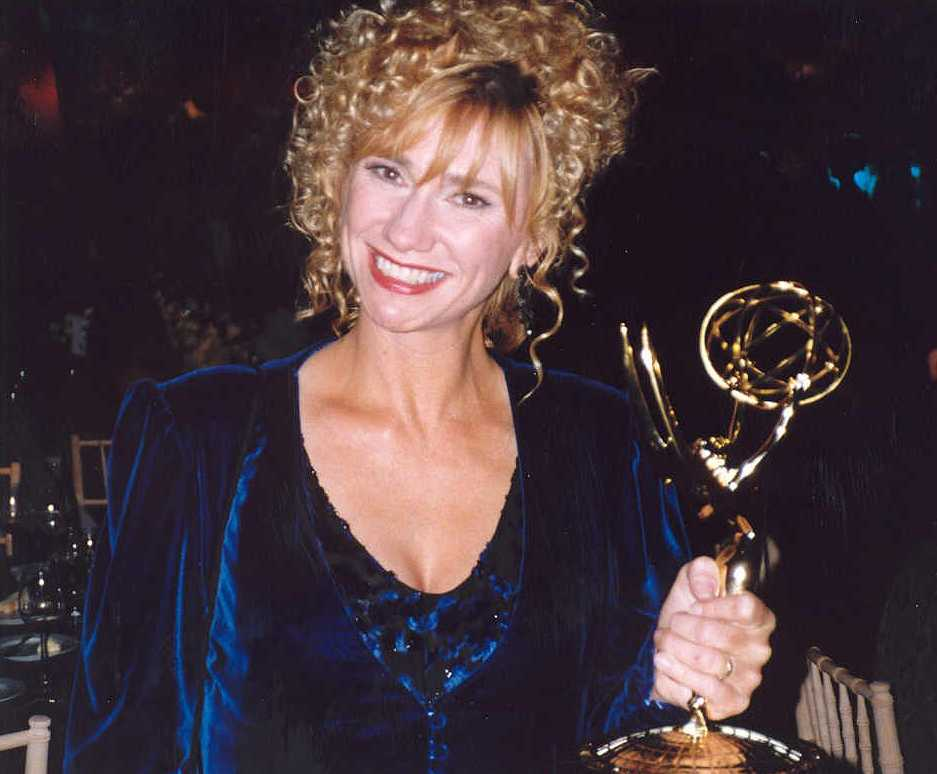
- Kathy Baker won the most awards for her performance as Jill Brock.
Awards and nominations
Award	Won	Nominated
American Television Awards	1	5
Artios Awards	0	3
Directors Guild of America Award	1	2
Edgar Allan Poe Awards	0	1
Emmy Awards	14	27
GLAAD Media Awards	0	1
Golden Globe Awards	1	9
Humanitas Prize	1	3
Screen Actors Guild Awards	1	4
Viewers for Quality Television	7	22
Writers Guild of America Award	0	2
Young Artist Award	2	8
YoungStar Awards	1	1
- Total number of wins and nominations
Totals	29	88
- References

Picket Fences is an American television drama series created by David E. Kelley and produced by David E. Kelley Productions, 20th Television and 20th Century Fox Television. The series tells the story of Rome, Wisconsin, a fictional small town with strange phenomenon and weird criminal activity, producing cases that the police, headed by Sheriff Jimmy Brock, are tasked with solving. Picket Fences aired on CBS from September 18, 1992 to June 26, 1996, broadcasting 88 episodes over four seasons during its initial run.

During the series' run, Picket Fences received nominations for a variety of different awards, including 27 Emmy Awards (with 14 wins), nine Golden Globe Awards (with one win), four Screen Actors Guild Awards (with one win), 2 Directors Guild of America Awards (with one win), and 22 Q Awards (with seven wins). Kathy Baker, who plays lead female character Jill Brock, received the most individual awards and nominations, won 3 Emmy Awards, a Golden Globe award, a SAG award, and 2 Q awards.

== Awards and nominations ==
=== Emmy Awards ===
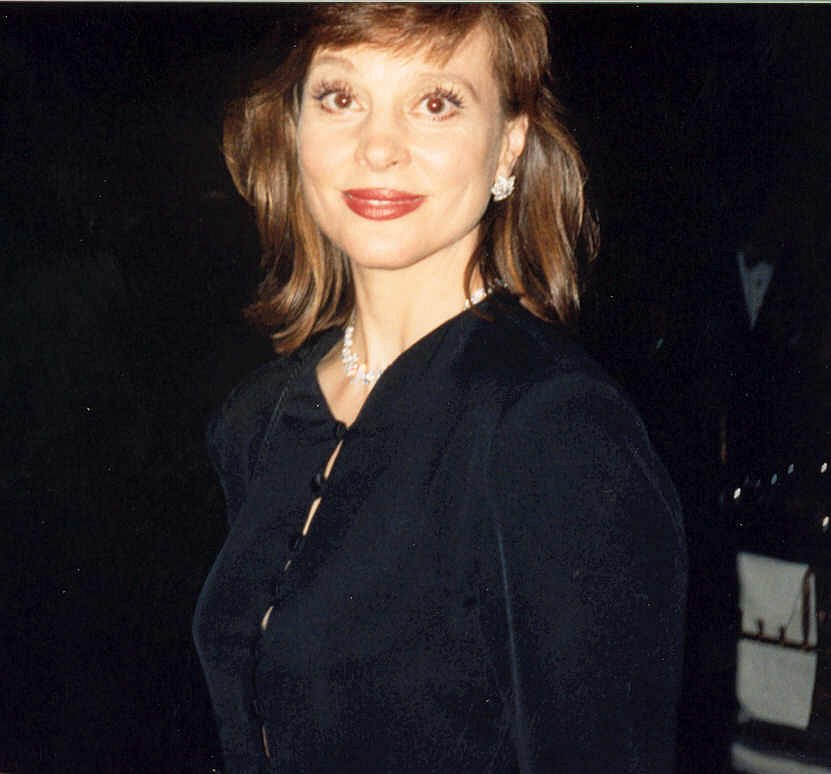
Leigh Taylor-Young won an Emmy award for her role as Mayor Rachel Harris.

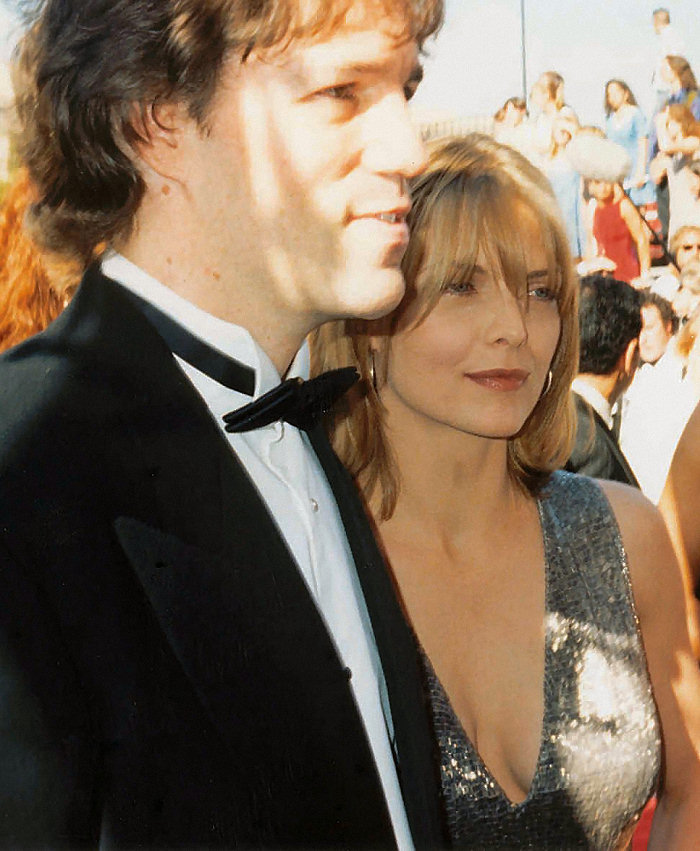
David E. Kelley, the series' creator and producer, won two Emmy awards for Outstanding Drama Series.

Picket Fences received 27 Primetime Emmy Award nominations, with fourteen wins — twelve Primetime and two Creative Arts. The series won the award for Outstanding Drama Series in 1993 and 1994. Kathy Baker won the award for Outstanding Lead Actress in a Drama Series in 1993, 1995 and 1996, and received a nomination for the award in 1994. Tom Skerritt won the award for Outstanding Lead Actor in a Drama Series in 1993 and was nominated for the award in 1994. The series won the award for Outstanding Supporting Actor in a Drama Series three times, with Fyvush Finkel receiving the award in 1994 and Ray Walston winning the award in 1995 and 1996. Leigh Taylor-Young won the award for Outstanding Supporting Actress in a Drama Series in 1994. Picket Fences also won the award for Outstanding Guest Actor in a Drama Series twice, with Richard Kiley winning in 1994 and Paul Winfield winning in 1995. The two Creative Arts Emmy Awards the series won were for Outstanding Individual Achievement in Costuming for a Series in 1994 and 1995.

==== Primetime Emmy Awards ====
Year	Category	Nominee(s)	Episodes(s)	Result	Ref
1993	Outstanding Drama Series	Robert Breech, David E. Kelley, Mark Perry, Jonathan Pontell, Michael Pressman, and Alice West		Won	
1993	Outstanding Lead Actor in a Drama Series	Tom Skerritt as Jimmy Brock	for "High Tidings"	Won	
1993	Outstanding Lead Actress in a Drama Series	Kathy Baker as Jill Brock	for "Thanksgiving"	Won	
1993	Outstanding Supporting Actor in a Drama Series	Fyvush Finkel as Douglas Wambaugh	for "The Body Politic"	Nominated	
1993	Outstanding Guest Actor in a Drama Series	Michael Jeter as Peter Lebeck	for "Frog Man"	Nominated	
1993	Outstanding Guest Actor in a Drama Series	Richard Kiley as Hayden Langston	for "Thanksgiving"	Nominated	
1994	Outstanding Drama Series	Robert Breech, Ann Donahue, David E. Kelley, Geoffrey Neigher, Jack Philbrick, Jonathan Pontell, Michael Pressman, and Alice West		Won	
1994	Outstanding Lead Actor in a Drama Series	Tom Skerritt as Jimmy Brock	for "Dairy Queen"	Nominated	
1994	Outstanding Lead Actress in a Drama Series	Kathy Baker as Jill Brock	for "Guns 'R' Us"	Nominated	
1994	Outstanding Supporting Actor in a Drama Series	Fyvush Finkel as Douglas Wambaugh	for "Turpitude" + "Squatter’s Rights"	Won	
1994	Outstanding Supporting Actor in a Drama Series	Ray Walston as Henry Bone	for "Blue Christmas" + "Abominable Snowman"	Nominated	
1994	Outstanding Supporting Actress in a Drama Series	Leigh Taylor-Young as Rachel Harris	for "Remote Control" + "Divine Recall"	Won	
1994	Outstanding Guest Actor in a Drama Series	James Earl Jones as Attorney Bryant Thomas	for "System Down"	Nominated	
1994	Outstanding Guest Actor in a Drama Series	Richard Kiley as Hayden Langston	for "Buried Alive"	Won	
1994	Outstanding Guest Actress in a Drama Series	Marlee Matlin as Laurie Bey	for "Dancing Bandit"	Nominated	
1995	Outstanding Lead Actress in a Drama Series	Kathy Baker as Jill Brock	for "Frogman Returns"	Won	
1995	Outstanding Supporting Actor in a Drama Series	Ray Walston as Henry Bone	for "Final Judgment"	Won	
1995	Outstanding Guest Actor in a Drama Series	Paul Winfield as Judge Harold Nance	for "Enemy Lines"	Won	
1996	Outstanding Lead Actress in a Drama Series	Kathy Baker as Jill Brock	for "Bottled"	Won	
1996	Outstanding Supporting Actor in a Drama Series	Ray Walston as Henry Bone	for "Witness for the Prosecution"	Won	
1996	Outstanding Guest Actress in a Drama Series	Louise Fletcher as Christine Bey	for "Bye Bye, Bey Bey"	Nominated	

==== Creative Arts Emmy Awards ====
Year	Category	Nominee(s)	Episodes(s)	Result	Ref
1993	Outstanding Individual Achievement in Costuming for a Series	Shelly Levine and Loree Parral	for "Pageantry"	Nominated	
1993	Outstanding Individual Achievement in Main Title Theme Music	Stewart Levin		Nominated	
1994	Outstanding Individual Achievement in Costuming for a Series	Shelly Levine and Loree Parral	for "Dairy Queen"	Won	
1995	Outstanding Individual Achievement in Costuming for a Series	Shelly Levine and Loree Parral	for "The Song of Rome"	Won	
1996	Outstanding Casting for a Series	Craig Campobasso and Richard Pagano		Nominated	
1996	Outstanding Costumes for a Series	Shelly Levine and Loree Parral	for "Three Weddings and a Funeral"	Nominated	

=== Golden Globe Awards ===
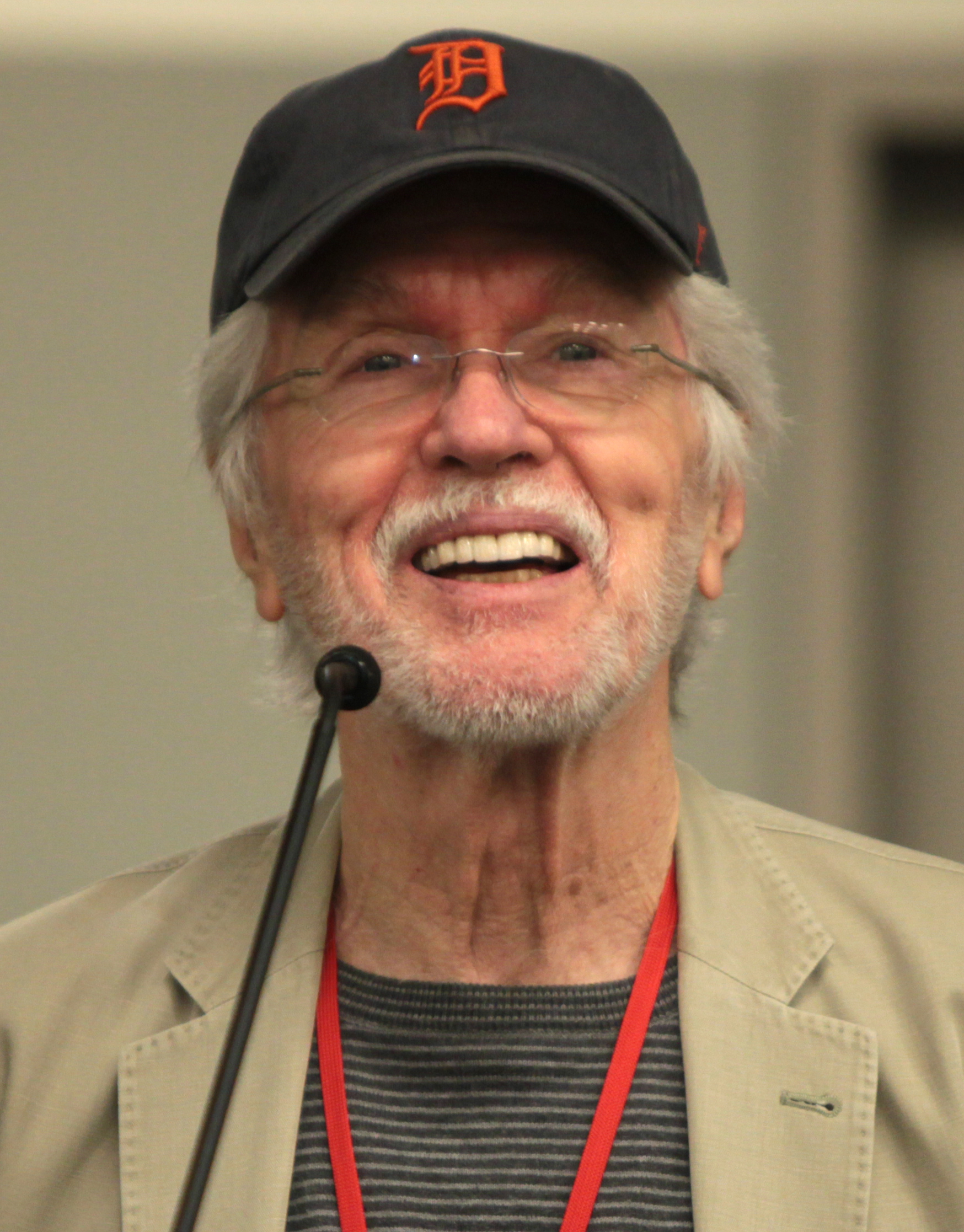
Tom Skerritt was nominated for two Golden Globe Awards for his performance as Sheriff Jimmy Brock.

Picket Fences received nine Golden Globe Award nominations during its tenure, with one win for Best Actress – Television Series Drama for Kathy Baker.

Year	Category	Nominee(s)	Result	Ref
1994	Best Television Series – Drama		Nominated	
1994	Best Actress – Television Series Drama	Kathy Baker as Jill Brock	Won	
1994	Best Actor – Television Series Drama	Tom Skerritt as Jimmy Brock	Nominated	
1995	Best Television Series – Drama		Nominated	
1995	Best Actress – Television Series Drama	Kathy Baker as Jill Brock	Nominated	
1995	Best Actor – Television Series Drama	Tom Skerritt as Jimmy Brock	Nominated	
1995	Best Supporting Actress – Series, Miniseries or Television Film	Leigh Taylor-Young as Rachel Harris	Nominated	
1995	Best Supporting Actor – Series, Miniseries or Television Film	Fyvush Finkel as Douglas Wambaugh	Nominated	
1996	Best Actress – Television Series Drama	Kathy Baker as Jill Brock	Nominated	

=== Screen Actors Guild Awards ===
Picket Fences received four Screen Actors Guild Award nominations, winning one for Outstanding Performance by a Female Actor in a Drama Series, awarded to Kathy Baker.

Year	Category	Nominee(s)	Result	Ref
1994	Outstanding Performance by a Female Actor in a Drama Series	Kathy Baker as Jill Brock	Won	
1994	Outstanding Performance by a Male Actor in a Drama Series	Tom Skerritt as Jimmy Brock	Nominated	
1994	Outstanding Performance by an Ensemble in a Drama Series	Kathy Baker, Don Cheadle, Holly Marie Combs, Kelly Connell, Robert Cornthwaite, Fyvush Finkel, Lauren Holly, Costas Mandylor, Justin Shenkarow, Tom Skerritt, Leigh Taylor-Young, Ray Walston, and Adam Wylie	Nominated	
1995	Outstanding Performance by an Ensemble in a Drama Series	Amy Aquino, Kathy Baker, Don Cheadle, Holly Marie Combs, Kelly Connell, Fyvush Finkel, Lauren Holly, Costas Mandylor, Marlee Matlin, Justin Shenkarow, Tom Skerritt, Ray Walston, and Adam Wylie	Nominated	

=== Viewers for Quality Television Awards ===
During its tenure, Picket Fences received 22 nominations for a Q award, presented by Viewers for Quality Television. The series won seven awards: one for Best Quality Drama Series; two for Best Actress in a Quality Drama Series, awarded to Kathy Baker; one for Best Supporting Actor in a Quality Drama Series, awarded to Fyvush Finkel; one for Best Supporting Actress in a Quality Drama Series, awarded to Lauren Holly; one for Best Recurring Player, awarded to Amy Aquino; and one for Specialty Player, awarded to Ray Walston.

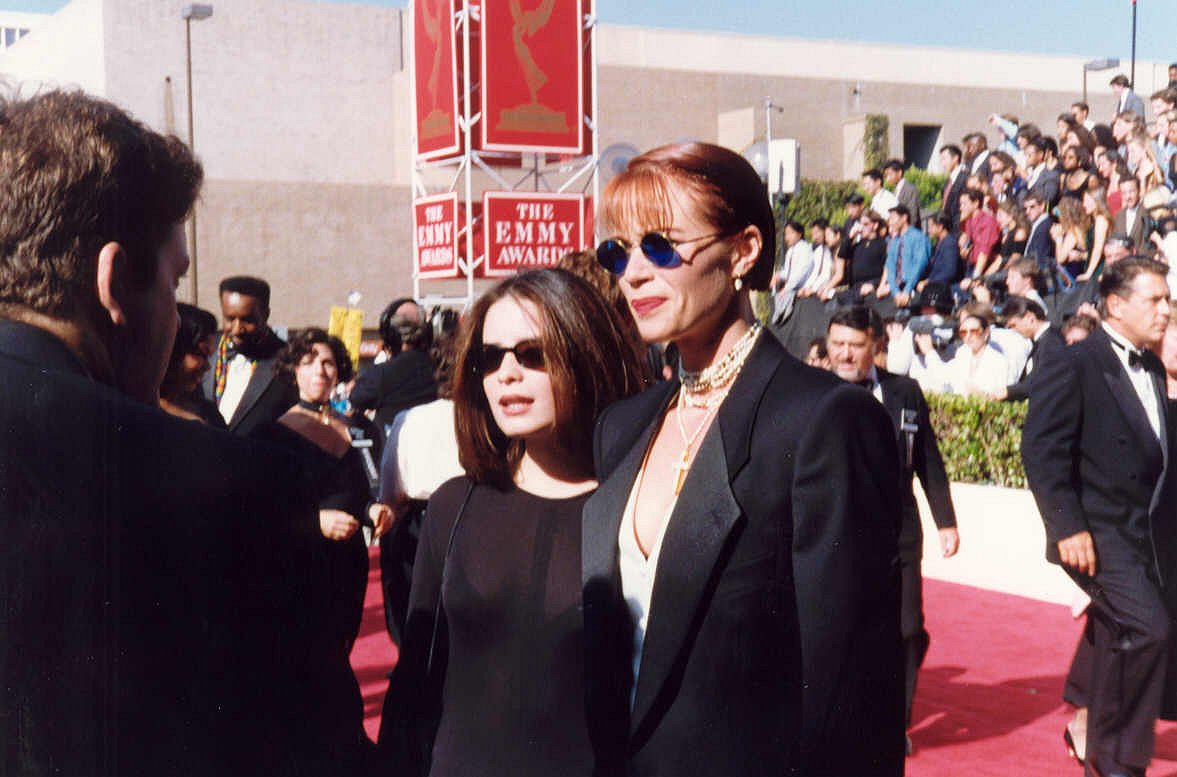
Lauren Holly (right) won a Q Award for her role as Maxine Stewart.

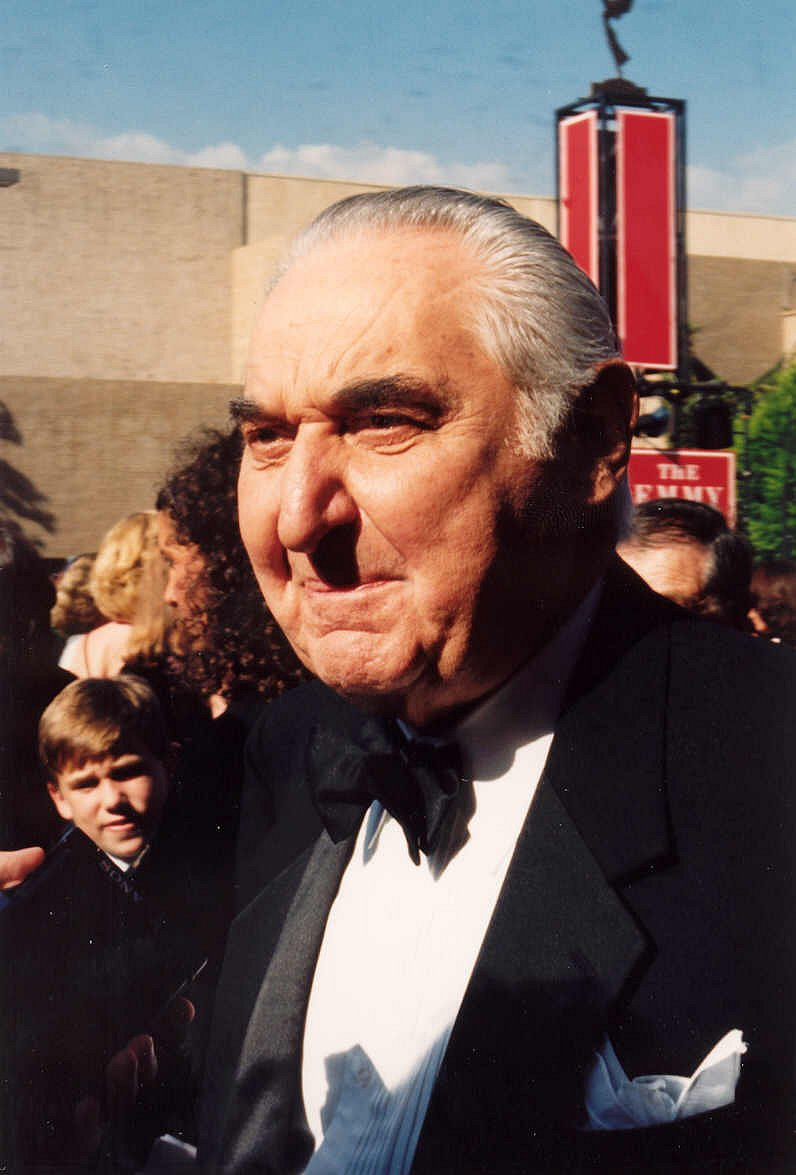
Fyvush Finkel won a Q award in 1994 for his performance as Douglas Wambaugh

Year	Category	Nominee(s)	Result	Ref
1993	Best Quality Drama Series		Nominated	
1993	Best Actor in a Quality Drama Series	Tom Skerritt	Nominated	
1993	Best Actress in a Quality Drama Series	Kathy Baker	Nominated	
1993	Best Supporting Actor in a Quality Drama Series	Fyvush Finkel	Nominated	
1993	Best Supporting Actress in a Quality Drama Series	Lauren Holly	Nominated	
1993	Specialty Player	Ray Walston	Won	
1994	Best Quality Drama Series		Nominated	
1994	Best Actor in a Quality Drama Series	Tom Skerritt	Nominated	
1994	Best Actress in a Quality Drama Series	Kathy Baker	Won	
1994	Best Supporting Actor in a Quality Drama Series	Fyvush Finkel	Won	
1994	Best Supporting Actor in a Quality Drama Series	Ray Walston	Nominated	
1994	Best Supporting Actress in a Drama Series	Lauren Holly	Won	
1994	Specialty Player	Robert Cornthwaite	Nominated	
1994	Specialty Player	Roy Dotrice	Nominated	
1995	Best Quality Drama Series		Won	
1995	Best Actress in a Quality Drama Series	Kathy Baker	Won	
1995	Best Supporting Actor in a Drama Series	Fyvush Finkel	Nominated	
1995	Best Supporting Actor in a Drama Series	Ray Walston	Nominated	
1995	Best Supporting Actress in a Drama Series	Lauren Holly	Nominated	
1995	Specialty Player	Marlee Matlin	Nominated	
1996	Best Actress in a Quality Drama Series	Kathy Baker	Nominated	
1996	Best Recurring Player	Amy Aquino	Won	

=== Young Artist Awards ===
Picket Fences received 8 nominations for a Young Artist Award, winning two awards – one for Best Young Actress in a New Television Series, awarded to Holly Marie Combs and one for Best Youth Actor Recurring or Regular in a TV Series, awarded to Adam Wylie.

Year	Category	Nominee(s)	Result	Ref
1991-1992	Best Young Actor in a New Television Series	Justin Shenkarow	Nominated	
1991-1992	Best Young Actress in a New Television Series	Holly Marie Combs	Won	
1991-1992	Outstanding Actor Under 10 in a Television Series	Adam Wylie	Nominated	
1992-1993	Best Youth Actor Recurring or Regular in a TV Series	Adam Wylie	Won	
1992-1993	Best Youth Actor Guest-Starring in a Television Show	Karl David-Djerf	Nominated	
1992-1993	Outstanding Youth Ensemble in a Television Series	Holly Marie Combs, Justin Shenkarow, and Adam Wylie	Nominated	
1992-1993	Best Performance by a Youth Actor in a Drama Series	Justin Shenkarow	Nominated	
1992-1993	Best Performance by a Youth Actor in a Drama Series	Adam Wylie	Nominated	

=== Other awards ===
Award	Date of ceremony	Category	Nominee(s)	Result	Ref
American Television Awards	1993	Best Actor in a Dramatic Series	Tom Skerritt	Nominated	
American Television Awards	1993	Best Actress in a Dramatic Series	Kathy Baker	Nominated	
American Television Awards	1993	Best Supporting Actor in a Dramatic Series	Fyvush Finkel	Won	
American Television Awards	1993	Best Supporting Actress in a Dramatic Series	Lauren Holly	Nominated	
American Television Awards	1993	Best Dramatic Series		Nominated	
Artios Awards	1993	Best Casting for TV, Dramatic Episodic	Sharon Bialy, Debi Manwiller and Richard Pagano	Nominated	
Artios Awards	1993	Best Casting for TV, Pilot	Sharon Bialy, Debi Manwiller and Richard Pagano	Nominated	
Artios Awards	1994	Best Casting for TV, Dramatic Episodic	Sharon Bialy, Debi Manwiller and Richard Pagano	Nominated	
Directors Guild of America Award	1992	Outstanding Directorial Achievement in Miniseries or Movies for Television	Ron Lagomarsino for "Pilot"	Won	
Directors Guild of America Award	1993	Outstanding Directorial Achievement in Dramatic Series	Lou Antonio for "The Dancing Bandit"	Nominated	
Edgar Allan Poe Award	1994	Best Television Episode	David E. Kelley for "Turpitude"	Nominated	
GLAAD Media Award	1997	Outstanding TV - Individual Episode		Nominated	
Humanitas Prize	1994	60 Minute Category	David E. Kelley for "Abominable Snowmen"	Nominated	
Humanitas Prize	1995	60 Minute Category	David E. Kelley for "Final Judgment"	Nominated	
Humanitas Prize	1996	60 Minute Category	Nick Harding & David E. Kelley	Won	
Writers Guild of America Award	1993	Television: Episodic Drama	David E. Kelley for "Thanskgiving"	Nominated	
Writers Guild of America Award	1995	Television: Episodic Drama	Nicholas C. Harding & David E. Kelley	Nominated	
YoungStar Award	1997	Best Performance by a Young Actor in a Drama TV Series	Adam Wylie	Nominated	
