= Paul Smith (American actor, born 1929) =

American actor (1929–2006)

- Paul Smith in There's Always Tomorrow 1956
- Born: Arthur Paul Smith; February 5, 1929; Pittsburgh, Pennsylvania, U.S.
- Died: March 3, 2006 (aged 77); North Hollywood, California, U.S.
- Occupation: Actor
- Years active: 1951–1982

Arthur Paul Smith (February 5, 1929 – March 3, 2006) was an American comic character actor with a perpetually perplexed expression, who, during the 1950s, 1960s, 1970s and early 1980s, appeared in scores of television episodes, primarily sitcoms, including regular roles in five series, and was also seen in numerous theatrical features, television films and commercials, frequently in brief, sometimes unbilled, comedic bits. He is perhaps best known for playing associate editor Ron Harvey on The Doris Day Show (1969—1971).

== Acting career during the 1950s ==
Born in Pennsylvania's second-largest city, Pittsburgh, Arthur Paul Smith moved to Los Angeles and, by the time of his 22nd birthday in 1951, began a 31-year acting career which lasted until his retirement, at age 53, in 1982. During the 1950s, he was seen in twenty-four theatrical features, from 1951's I Want You to 1959's The FBI Story, with his work in thirteen of those being uncredited and the remainder providing him with mostly small parts which were credited near the bottom of the cast list. One exception, in 1957, was a sixth-billed role in Elvis Presley's first starring vehicle, Loving You. in which he plays Skeeter, a comical member of Elvis' backup band, who converses with his friend Matilda, the band's caged parrot.

Smith was also in 24 television episodes encompassing eighteen series, from 1955's The Halls of Ivy, Navy Log and The 20th Century Fox Hour to 1959's Dinah Shore Show, in addition to a regular role on the 1959 sitcom Fibber McGee and Molly.

=== Fibber McGee and Molly ===
In the first of his five sitcoms, Smith plays the McGees' next-door neighbor Roy Norris, a family man with a wife (Elisabeth Fraser) and 11-year-old daughter (Barbara Beaird). The actors playing the McGees (Bob Sweeney and Cathy Lewis) could not, however, duplicate the long-running (1935–59) unique ambiance of the original radio McGees (Jim Jordan and Marian Jordan) and the Tuesday night NBC series folded in January 1960 after airing 13 filmed episodes.

== Acting career during the 1960s ==
In the course of the 1960s, which became his busiest decade, Smith was, again, continually employed, appearing in ten features: one in 1960, Visit to a Small Planet, one in 1961, The Silent Call, two in 1964, Advance to the Rear and Bikini Beach, one in 1965, The Great Race, two in 1968, Disney's The Horse in the Gray Flannel Suit, in which he played Eddie the policeman, and the independent Stranger and the Dead Season, and two additional independents in 1969, The Erotic Adventures of Robin Hood (in which he was Will Scarlet) and The Assassination of the Dog, as well as another appearance as a Disney policeman in part 2 of the two-part television film My Dog, the Thief, produced for the Disney anthology series.

Aside from the three independents and credited bits in Bikini Beach and My Dog, the Thief, his remaining five appearances, which were in major studio films, went unbilled. Although in comparison to twenty-four titles in the 1950s, his theatrical output dropped to nine, all of his remaining work schedule was consumed by television where his output increased greatly.

Seen in episodes of thirty series, starting in the 1960s, with Johnny Midnight, Batman, Markham, Checkmate and Thriller, and ending in 1969 with Ironside and Adam-12, he was also a cast member in four sitcoms, among those series, and a semi-regular on a fifth, ABC's Bewitched, where, between 1966 and 1972, he appeared in nine episodes, usually playing a befuddled or exasperated cop who is flummoxed by the magical witchcraft of Samantha (Elizabeth Montgomery). The size of his roles was mostly small and he did not even receive billing in the credits of some of his TV installments.

Smith's earliest 1960s sitcom was CBS' Mrs. G. Goes to College, which marked Gertrude Berg's return to series TV in October 1961, after having portrayed a character, coincidentally also named "Molly", Molly Goldberg, on her long-running ethnic family sitcom, The Goldbergs, which predated the McGees' Molly by six years, having begun on radio in 1929, moved to CBS television in 1949 and ended in 1956. The plot centers around Sarah Green, a widow in her early sixties, who decides to acquire higher education, matriculates in her hometown college and interacts with, among others, her Cambridge University exchange professor (Cedric Hardwicke) and next-door neighbor George Howell, a character analogous to Smith's Roy Norris from Fibber McGee and Molly, replete with a no-nonsense wife (Aneta Corsaut).

As with Fibber McGee, the new series could not come even close to the success of the original and, after thirteen episodes, a midseason move from Tuesday to Wednesday night, along a title change designed to emphasize Berg's name, The Gertrude Berg Show, was unable to improve the ratings for the remaining thirteen episodes and abruptly ended its run in April 1962, without showing any repeats. Although the show did receive two Emmy nominations, Outstanding Continued Performance by an Actress in a Series (Lead) for Gertrude Berg and Outstanding Performance in a Supporting Role by an Actress for Mary Wickes, co-star Cedric Hardwicke, in a 1962 TV Guide article which focuses on his work in the series, and references him as "Sir Cedric", is quoted as commenting, "if you're going to work in rubbish, you might as well get paid for it". One of the later episodes in the renamed series, "Goodbye, Mr. Howell", broadcast on February 15, 1962, actually centers around Paul Smith's character, as George Howell encounters unexpected problems and has to consider selling his house.

=== No Time for Sergeants and Mr. Terrific ===
Three years following Mrs. G. and, after having spent a couple of 1963 episodes playing Commander Carter in the World War II-set military sitcom McHale's Navy, Paul Smith was back in uniform as a clueless captain at Andrews Airforce Base, during peacetime, in No Time for Sergeants, his third regular role on a sitcom. Making its ABC debut on September 14, 1964, the series was based on a 1955 episode of the Golden Age of Television live anthology drama series, The United States Steel Hour, which starred Andy Griffith as Private Will Stockdale, a folksy storytelling southerner who has a commonsense remedy for every problem, thus frustrating his slow-burning, by-the-book sergeant. The play became a long-running 1955–57 Broadway play and a 1958 film, with star Andy Griffith continuing to repeat his role. In 1964, however, Griffith was busy with his own show, playing a folksy Southern sheriff on CBS' Monday night sitcom The Andy Griffith Show, which had premiered in 1960. The role of Will Stockdale was ultimately won by little-known young actor Sammy Jackson.

Smith's character, Captain Martin, sometimes called Captain Martinson, was unnamed and barely noticeable in the earlier productions and his primary function in the TV series, as the immediate superior of the sergeant and his recruits, was to react in a series of surprised, uncomprehending, confused or bemused expressions upon hearing Will Stockdale's explanations delivered in his patented southern drawl and observing his ability to easily overcome any adversity. The show completed a full season set of 34 episodes and 17 repeats in its Monday night at 8:30 time slot, but in a programming coincidence, was scheduled directly opposite Andy Griffith's sitcom on CBS and could not overcome the top-rated competition from the original Will Stockdale. The final repeat episode of No Time for Sergeants aired on September 6, 1965, 51 weeks after its premiere. Three and a half months later, on Christmas Eve, Smith was seen as an unnamed captain in a similar scene with a similar character in the "Gomer Pyle, P.O.W." episode of the more-successful show patterned after No Time for Sergeants, CBS' Gomer Pyle, U.S.M.C., and, while both shows premiered the same month, Gomer Pyle ran for five seasons, until September 1969.

Over a year of guest shots passed before Paul Smith was cast as a regular in another sitcom, his second on CBS and, again, on Monday night. The superhero spoof, Mr. Terrific, was a midseason replacement for The Fugitive-like failed sitcom Run, Buddy, Run. Programmed at 8, it was preceded by the cult sitcom Gilligan's Island and followed by three of CBS' highest-rated sitcoms, The Lucy Show, The Andy Griffith Show and Family Affair. It was also immediately followed, at 8:30 on NBC, by another superhero spoof, Captain Nice which, in similar fashion, bestowed, through ingestion of pills or chemical concoction, superhuman powers upon a diffident, milquetoast protagonist. Before he had won the part, the actor cast as Mr. Terrific, Stephen Strimpell, had, in fact, tested for the title role in Captain Nice, which ultimately went to William Daniels.

Both characters, upon taking their "medication", turn, for a brief period, into caped crime fighters. Mr. Terrific's real identity is Stanley Beamish, a service-station owner who serves, as superhero, the "Bureau of Special Projects". In the show's lengthy cartoon opening credits which explain, in song, the concept, Paul Smith, appearing as a regular cast member in his first color series, receives, for the first time, credit as a member of the cast. Playing Harley Trent, an agent for the Bureau, Smith, whose rounded-face, stretched-mouth caricature overemphasizes his trademark goofy, bemused smile, is shown third, following Strimpell and Dick Gautier as Hal, Beamish's best friend. Mr. Terrific premiered the first of its 17 episodes the same day as Captain Nice, January 17, 1967 and presented its final repeat just over seven months later, on August 28, the same day as Captain Nice's last showing. Universal Television, which produced the series, subsequently edited three of the episodes into a feature film, The Pill Caper, which was put into TV syndication.

== The Doris Day Show ==
Two more years of guest appearances followed, with Paul Smith eventually cast in The Doris Day Show, his final, and longest-running, sitcom, seen, as in the case of his two previous shows, Monday nights on CBS. The actress-singer had just completed what turned out to be her last theatrical feature, 1968's With Six You Get Eggroll, in which she plays the widowed mother of three sons. With the film set for release in August, she started filming episodes for her only network TV series, due to debut in September, playing Doris Martin, the widowed mother of two sons. The first season had her living with the boys on her father's ranch but, starting with the second season in September 1969, the Tuesday night series moved to Monday and also changed the setting, with Doris now commuting to San Francisco, having found work as a secretary at a magazine called Today's World. Among the publication's staff is associate editor Ron Harvey, played by Paul Smith. During the second season, the opening credits showed, at the office, Doris' co-workers "McLean Stevenson as Mr. Nicholson and Rose Marie as Myrna", playing the editor and the wisecracking secretary. By the third season, however, as Doris and her sons moved away from the ranch to live in San Francisco, those credits reflected Paul Smith's increased importance on the series, indicated by the addition of his live image in third place, after Doris Day and Rose Marie, with McLean Stevenson now shown in fourth place.

Having been a regular for two seasons on The Doris Day Show, Paul Smith as well as all other supporting cast members were replaced with a new cast. For the show's last two seasons (1971–73), Doris Day was still named "Doris Martin", but was rebranded as a swinging single with no family, still at the same-named Today's World, but upgraded to associate editor, with a new set of co-workers.

== Final decade as a screen actor ==
After departing Doris Day in 1971, in his last eleven years in front of the cameras, Smith had small roles in a couple of made-for-TV movies (My Dog, the Thief) and one theatrical feature (1972's Now You See Him, Now You Don't). Of his nine appearances on Bewitched, five were in the 1970s — two in 1970, two in 1971 and one in 1972. There were also five appearances on segments of the ABC comedy anthology series Love, American Style, one in 1969, two in 1971, one in 1972 and one in 1973, in which he was billed as A. Paul Smith. His sole 1974 credit is a guest shot on ABC's police drama The Rookies, while in 1975, he was seen in two: an episode of ABC's prison-set sitcom On the Rocks (an Americanized version of the British series Porridge), along with an installment of the NBC law enforcement anthology drama Police Story. His final on-screen billing as Paul Smith was in "Mr. Mephisto", the second episode (broadcast September 18, 1976) of the Saturday morning live action children's series Monster Squad, playing a character named Officer McMacMac.

During the 1970s, another actor named Paul Smith was being cast in substantial film and television roles and, for the first time since the start of his acting career in 1951, Smith had a year or more without any screen credits. After a three-year interruption in his screen career, he returned to television, billed as A. Paul Smith or A. P. Smith.

In 1979, his was one of the voices in the South Korean manhwa Wooju heukgisa, also known as Captain of Cosmos and Space Black Knight. Between 1979 and 1982, he appeared in seven episodes of TV series, starting with the November 27, 1979 episode of The Misadventures of Sheriff Lobo. There was a small role in a 1981 made-for-TV film, The Million Dollar Face, two episodes of Alice and The Dukes of Hazzard and, in 1982, one episode each of Little House on the Prairie and Father Murphy, which represented his final on-screen work.

== Personal life and death ==
An April 1970 column by UPI entertainment industry writer Vernon Scott was devoted to Smith, with Scott describing Smith's home life during the time he was about to start filming episodes for his second season as a regular on The Doris Day Show. Scott also mentioned that Smith was divorced and had custody of his 11-year-old son Neil with whom he shared a small apartment in the San Fernando Valley.

Smith died in North Hollywood, California on March 3, 2006, at age 77.

== Other actors named Paul Smith ==
Paul Smith's credits have been frequently commingled with those of two other American performers — cowboy musician Paul "Clem" Smith who made unbilled appearances in seven western films between 1946 and 1948, and a later actor (1960s to 1990s) whose name appeared on many occasions in credit listings as Paul Smith — as well as with credits of the 1980s and early 1990s actor (born 1968) who, during his teens and early twenties, while appearing in a number of TV series and a few feature films in his native Australia, was billed as Paul Smith.

The American actor whose career under the name Paul Smith lasted from the 1960 to the 1990s, was born in 1936 and died in 2012. Distinctive for his imposing size and hulking, occasionally bearded persona, he began acting in 1960, but the great majority of his credits are from the 1970s and 1980s, with a few stretching into the 1990s (billed as "Paul Smith" in his final credit, 1999's D.R.E.A.M. Team). Although on at least one occasion (in 1963) he was billed as P. L. Smith and on at least three occasions (in 1979) as Paul Lawrence Smith, his most frequent billing has been alternatively Paul L. Smith or, simply, Paul Smith (billed as "Paul Smith" in what may be his best known role, that of the brutal Turkish prison guard, Hamidou, in the 1978 cult film Midnight Express).

Some of the film and television credits from the late 1960s and the first half of the 1970s, in which he was billed as "Paul Smith", overlap those of the subject of this article, for whom the website AllMovie has no descriptive listing and had assigned all of his film credits (as well as individual television episodes of series such as Bewitched and The Doris Day Show) to Paul L. Smith. Other filmographies, including those in American Film Institute Catalog and Turner Classic Movies also have been featuring Paul Smith filmographies with incorrect attributions.

Working in Italy, during the mid-1970s, Paul L. Smith co-starred in a series of five action films which traded on his resemblance to big, burly, bearded Bud Spencer who, at the time, starred and co-starred in a continuing series of European action films, but when the American distributor of one such film with Smith decided to market it through the replacement of Smith's name with "Bob Spencer", Smith sued in 1980, successfully arguing that "the only thing an actor has is his name and if that's taken away, he has nothing".
