= List of submissions to the 49th Academy Awards for Best Foreign Language Film =

1976 Best Foreign Language Film submissions

Highlights
- Oscar winner: (Ivory Coast) Black and White in Color
- Submissions: 24
- Debuts: 1

This is a list of submissions to the 49th Academy Awards for Best Foreign Language Film. The Academy Award for Best Foreign Language Film was created in 1956 by the Academy of Motion Picture Arts and Sciences to honour non-English-speaking films produced outside the United States. The award is handed out annually, and is accepted by the winning film's director, although it is considered an award for the submitting country as a whole. Countries are invited by the Academy to submit their best films for competition according to strict rules, with only one film being accepted from each country.

For the 49th Academy Awards, twenty-four films were submitted in the category Academy Award for Best Foreign Language Film. Japan failed to submit a film, for the first and only time, while East Germany received its only nomination ever for Jacob the Liar. The five nominated films came from the Ivory Coast, East Germany, France, Italy and Poland.

Ivory Coast won for the first time with Black and White in Color by Jean-Jacques Annaud.

== Submissions ==
Submitting country	Film title used in nomination	Original title	Language(s)	Director(s)	Result
Argentina	Yesterday's Guys Used No Arsenic	Los muchachos de antes no usaban arsénico	Spanish	José A. Martínez Suárez	Not nominated
Belgium	High Street	Rue Haute	French	André Ernotte	Not nominated
Brazil	Xica	Xica da Silva	Brazilian Portuguese	Carlos Diegues	Not nominated
Czechoslovakia	One Silver Piece	Jeden Stříbrný	Czech	Jaroslav Balík	Not nominated
Denmark	The Olsen Gang Sees Red	Olsen-banden ser rødt	Danish	Erik Balling	Not nominated
Egypt	Whom Should We Shoot?	على من نطلق الرصاص	Arabic	Kamal El Sheikh	Not nominated
France	Cousin, Cousine		French	Jean-Charles Tacchella	Nominated
East Germany	Jacob the Liar	Jakob der Lügner	German	Frank Beyer	Nominated
West Germany	The Clown	Ansichten eines Clowns	German	Vojtěch Jasný	Not nominated
Hong Kong	The Last Tempest	瀛台泣血	Mandarin	Han Hsiang Li	Not nominated
Hungary	The Fifth Seal	Az ötödik pecsét	Hungarian	Zoltán Fábri	Not nominated
Italy	Seven Beauties	Pasqualino Settebellezze	Italian	Lina Wertmüller	Nominated
Ivory Coast	Black and White in Color	Noirs et blancs en couleur	French, English	Jean-Jacques Annaud	Won Academy Award
Mexico	Length of War	Longitud de guerra	Spanish	Gonzalo Martínez Ortega	Not nominated
Netherlands	Max Havelaar	Max Havelaar of de koffieveilingen der Nederlandsche handelsmaatschappij	Dutch, Indonesian	Fons Rademakers	Not nominated
Philippines	Ganito Kami Noon, Paano Kayo Ngayon	Ganito Kami Noon, Paano Kayo Ngayon	Tagalog, Filipino, English, Spanish	Eddie Romero	Not nominated
Poland	Nights and Days	Noce i dnie	Polish	Jerzy Antczak	Nominated
Romania	The Doom	Osânda	Romanian	Sergiu Nicolaescu	Not nominated
Soviet Union	They Fought For Their Motherland	Они сражались за родину	Russian	Sergei Bondarchuk	Not nominated
Spain	Raise Ravens	Cría cuervos	Spanish	Carlos Saura	Not nominated
Sweden	City of My Dreams	Mina drömmars stad	Swedish	Ingvar Skogsberg	Not nominated
Switzerland	Jonah Who Will Be 25 in the Year 2000	Jonas qui aura 25 ans en l'an 2000	French	Alain Tanner	Not nominated
Taiwan	Eight Hundred Heroes	八百壮士	Mandarin	Ting Shan-hsi	Not nominated
Yugoslavia	The Rat Savior	Izbavitelj	Serbo-Croatian	Krsto Papić	Not nominated

== Sources ==
- Margaret Herrick Library, Academy of Motion Picture Arts and Sciences
