= Renyi =

Renyi or Rényi may refer to:

== People ==
- Alfréd Rényi (1921–1970), Hungarian mathematician
- Katalin Rényi (1951–2023), Hungarian painter and graphic designer
- Tibor Rényi (1973–), Hungarian painter
- Tom Renyi (1947–), American banker and businessman

== Locations in China ==
- Renyi, Rongchang County (仁义镇), town in Rongchang County, Chongqing
- Renyi, Hezhou (仁义镇), town in Babu District, Hezhou, Guangxi
- Renyi, Guiyang County (仁义镇), town in Guiyang County, Hunan
- Renyi, Leiyang (仁义镇), a town of Leiyang City, Hunan.
