= Fyvush Finkel =

American actor

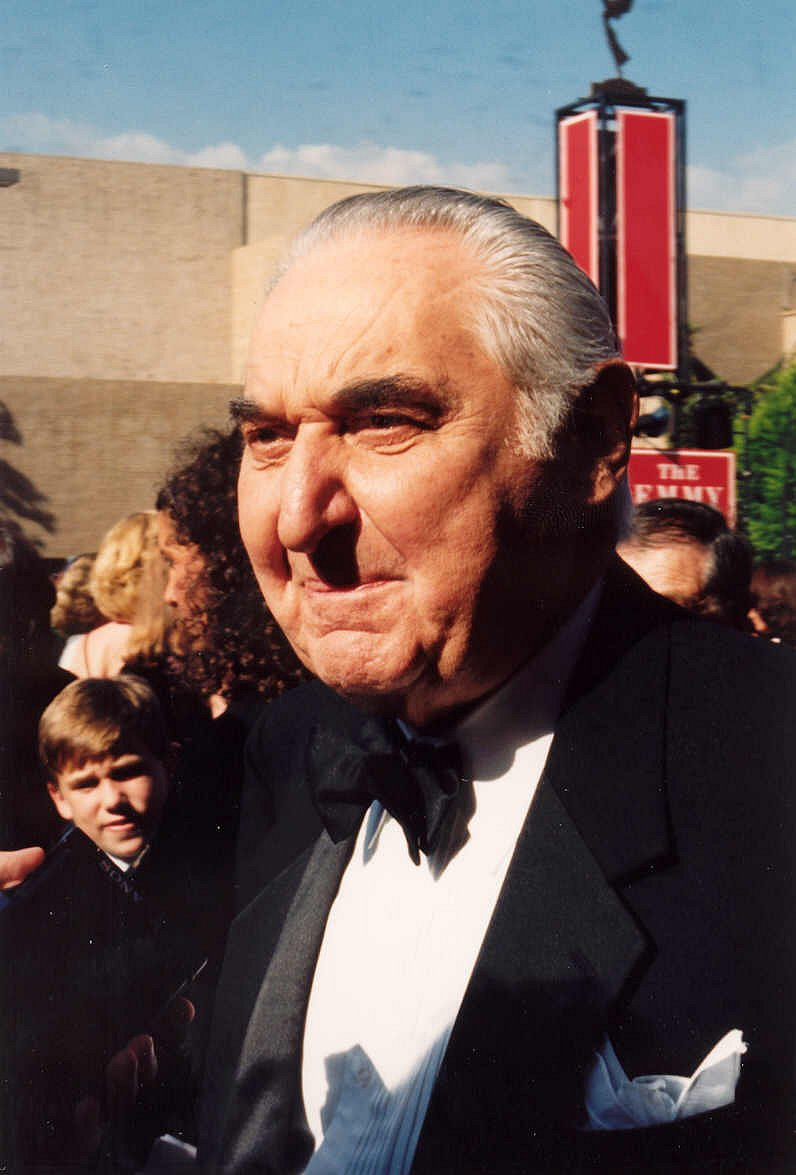
- Finkel on the red carpet at the 1994 Emmys
- Born: Philip Finkel; October 9, 1922; New York City, U.S.
- Died: August 14, 2016 (aged 93); New York City, U.S.
- Occupation: Actor
- Years active: 1931–2016
- Television: Picket Fences; Boston Public
- Spouse: Trudi Lieberman (m. 1947; died 2009)
- Children: 2
- Awards: Emmy Award (1994)

Philip "Fyvush" Finkel (Yiddish: פֿײַוויש פֿינקעל; October 9, 1922 – August 14, 2016) was an American actor and director known as a star of Yiddish theater and for his role as lawyer Douglas Wambaugh on the television series Picket Fences, for which he earned an Emmy Award for Outstanding Supporting Actor in a Drama Series in 1994. He is also known for his portrayal of Harvey Lipschultz, a crotchety history teacher, on the television series Boston Public.

== Early life ==
Philip Finkel was born at home in Brownsville, Brooklyn, New York City, the third of four sons of Jewish immigrant parents, Mary ("Miryam"), a housewife from Minsk, Belarus, and Harry ("Tsvi Hirsh") Finkel, a tailor from Warsaw. He adopted the stage name "Fyvush", a common Yiddish given name.

== Career ==
Finkel first appeared on the stage at age 9, and acted for almost 35 years in the thriving Yiddish theaters of the Yiddish Theater District of Manhattan's Lower East Side, as well as performing as a standup comic in the Catskills' Borscht Belt. In 2008, he recalled:

I played child parts till I was 14, 15, then my voice changed. So I decided to learn a trade and went to a vocational high school in New York. I studied to be a furrier, but I never worked at it. As soon as I graduated high school, I went to a stock company in Pittsburgh, a Jewish theater, and I played there for 38 weeks, and that's where I actually learned my trade a little bit as an adult.

He worked regularly until the ethnic venues began dying out in the early 1960s, then made his Broadway theatre debut in the original 1964 production of the musical Fiddler on the Roof, joining the cast as Mordcha, the innkeeper, in 1965. The production ran through July 2, 1972. Finkel then played Lazar Wolf, the butcher, in the limited-run 1981 Broadway revival, and eventually played the lead role of Tevye the milkman for years in the national touring company.

Shortly afterward, Finkel succeeded Hy Anzell in the role of Mr. Mushnik in the Off-Broadway musical Little Shop of Horrors. Then in 1988, Finkel's work as "Sam" in the New York Shakespeare Festival revival of the Yiddish classic Cafe Crown earned him an Obie Award and a Drama Desk nomination.

Finkel made his movie debut in the English-subtitled, Yiddish sketch-comedy revue Monticello, Here We Come (1950), then after small parts in an episode of the television series Kojak in 1977 and the miniseries Evergreen in 1985, returned to film in the detective comedy Off Beat (1986). That same year saw a role opposite Robin Williams in a PBS American Playhouse adaptation of Saul Bellow's novel Seize the Day and a role in the film adaptation of Neil Simon's Broadway comedy Brighton Beach Memoirs. An appearance as a lawyer in director Sidney Lumet's Q & A (1990) led TV producer-writer David E. Kelley to cast Finkel as public defender Douglas Wambaugh in the television series Picket Fences (CBS, 1992–1996). For the role, Finkel earned a 1994 Emmy Award, announcing at the televised ceremonies that he had waited 51 years for that moment.

Following the end of Picket Fences, Finkel had a regular role on the short-lived revival of Fantasy Island (ABC, 1998) and then reteamed with Kelley to play history teacher Harvey Lipschultz in Boston Public (Fox; 2000–04).

In the 1990s and 2000s, Finkel appeared in movies including Nixon and The Crew, guested on TV series including Chicago Hope, Law & Order, Early Edition, and Hollywood Squares, and provided voiceovers for episodes of the animated series The Simpsons ("Lisa's Sax") and Aaahh!!! Real Monsters ("Ickis! You'll Be Snorched!") and the animated direct-to-video feature The Brave Little Toaster Goes to Mars. In 2009, he appeared in the Coen brothers' film A Serious Man, and in 2013 had a guest appearance in Blue Bloods ("Men In Black")

Finkel continued to appear onstage in productions such as Fyvush Finkel: From Second Avenue to Broadway (1997) and Classic Stage Company's historical drama New Jerusalem (2007), by David Ives.

== Personal life ==
Finkel was married to Trudi Lieberman from March 1947 until her death in 2009. They had two sons: Ian, a musical arranger and xylophonist, and Elliot, a concert pianist.

Finkel died in Manhattan on August 14, 2016, at the age of 93, as a result of heart problems.

== Awards ==
- American Comedy Award for his performance in Picket Fences (1993)
- Emmy Award for Outstanding Supporting Actor in a Drama Series, Picket Fences (1993–94)
- Obie Award for his performance in Cafe Crown (1988–89)

== Filmography ==
=== Film ===
| Year | Title | Role | Notes |
|---|---|---|---|
| 1950 | Monticello, Here We Come | | |
| 1986 | Off Beat | Vendor | |
| 1986 | Seize the Day | Shomier | |
| 1986 | Brighton Beach Memoirs | Mr. Greenblat | |
| 1990 | Q&A | Preston Pearlstein | |
| 1991 | Mobsters | Tailor | |
| 1993 | The Pickle | Mr. Shacknoff | |
| 1993 | For Love or Money | Milton Glickman | |
| 1995 | Aaron's Magic Village | Narrator | English version, Voice |
| 1995 | Nixon | Murray Chotiner | Nominated—Screen Actors Guild Award for Outstanding Performance by a Cast in a Motion Picture |
| 1998 | The Brave Little Toaster Goes to Mars | Hearing Aid | Voice |
| 2000 | The Crew | Sol Lowenstein | |
| 2009 | A Serious Man | Traitl Groshkover | Nominated—Boston Society of Film Critics Award for Best Cast |
| 2013 | The Other Men in Black | Moshe | |
| 2015 | Deli Man | Himself | |
| 2016 | Game Day | Max | Final role |

=== Television ===
| Year | Title | Role | Notes |
|---|---|---|---|
| 1977 | Kojak | Simon | Episode: "Kojak Days: Part 1" |
| 1992–1996 | Picket Fences | Douglas Wambaugh | 87 episodes Primetime Emmy Award for Outstanding Supporting Actor in a Drama Series; Nominated—Viewers for Quality Television Award for Best Supporting Actor in a Quality Drama Series; Nominated—Golden Globe Award for Best Supporting Actor – Series, Miniseries or Television Film; Nominated—Primetime Emmy Award for Outstanding Supporting Actor in a Drama Series; Nominated—Screen Actors Guild Award for Outstanding Performance by an Ensemble in a Drama Series (1995–96); Nominated—Viewers for Quality Television Award for Best Supporting Actor in a Quality Drama Series (1993, 1995) |
| 1995 | Chicago Hope | Douglas Wambaugh | Episode: "Small Sacrifices" |
| 1995 | Aaahh!!! Real Monsters | Jackie Jarr | 2 episodes |
| 1995 | Great Performances | Himself | Episode: "Itzhak Perlman: In the Fiddler's House" |
| 1996, 1999 | Early Edition | Phil Kazakian | 2 episodes |
| 1996 | Rugrats | Shlomo | Episode: "Chanukah" |
| 1997 | The Simpsons | Himself as Krusty the Clown | Voice role, episode: "Lisa's Sax" |
| 1998–1999 | Fantasy Island | Fisher | 13 episodes |
| 2000–2004 | Boston Public | Harvey Lipschultz | 70 episodes |
| 2000–2003 | Hollywood Squares | Himself | 10 episodes |
| 2007 | The Wedding Bells | Saul Finkelstein | Episode: "For Whom the Bells Toll" |
| 2011 | Harry's Law | Abe Gold | Episode: "The Rematch" |
| 2013 | Blue Bloods | Moishe | Episode: "Men in Black" |
