= Tamás Rényi =

Hungarian film director

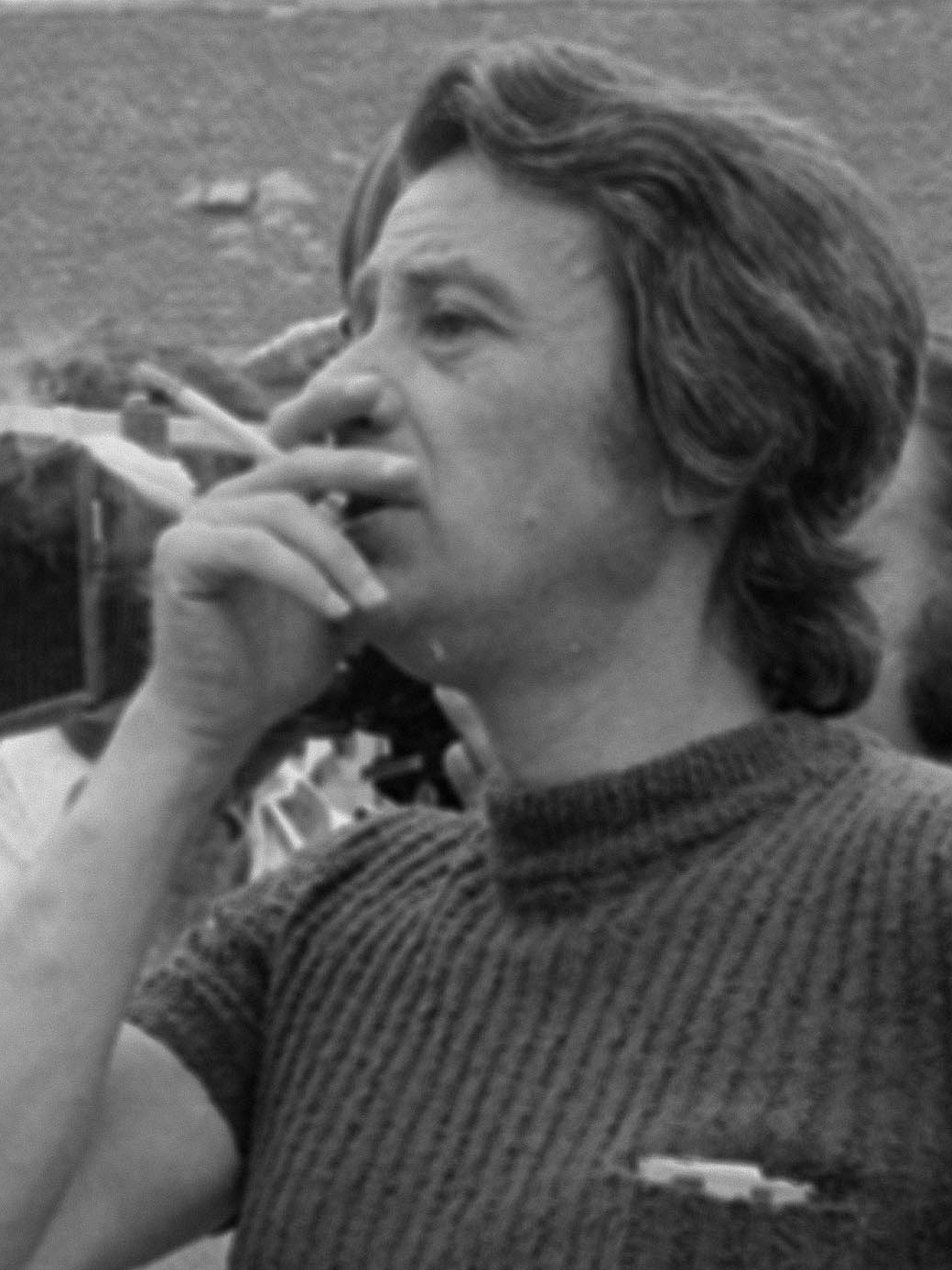
- Rényi in 1970
- Born: 29 May 1929; Budapest, Hungary
- Died: 28 July 1980 (aged 51); Budapest, Hungary
- Occupation: Film director
- Years active: 1953-1980
- Children: Katalin Rényi

Tamás Rényi (29 May 1929 – 28 July 1980) was a Hungarian film director. He directed 30 films between 1953 and 1980. His 1963 film Tales of a Long Journey was entered into the 3rd Moscow International Film Festival where it won a Silver Prize. His daughter was artist Katalin Rényi.

== Selected filmography ==
- Tales of a Long Journey (1963)
