= František Zvarík =

Slovak actor (1921–2008)

- Born: 17 July 1921; Vrútky, Czechoslovakia
- Died: 17 August 2008 (aged 87); Bratislava, Slovakia
- Occupation: Actor

František Zvarík (Slovak pronunciation: [ˈfraɲciʂeɡ ˈzʋariːk]; 17 July 1921 – 17 August 2008) was a Slovak actor. He played over 50 years in Slovak National Theatre and was a movie character actor. He has appeared in about two dozen Czechoslovak and Slovak films since the 1940s. Among his accomplishments is the key supporting role of the town commander Markuš Kolkotský in The Shop on Main Street, a film which won the 1965 Academy Award for Best Foreign Language Film.
