= The Angel Levine =

1970 film

- Theatrical release poster
- Directed by: Ján Kadár
- Screenplay by: Bill Gunn; Ronald Ribman
- Story by: Bernard Malamud
- Produced by: Harry Belafonte
- Starring: Zero Mostel; Harry Belafonte; Ida Kamińska; Milo O'Shea; Gloria Foster
- Cinematography: Richard C. Kratina
- Edited by: Carl Lerner
- Music by: Zdeněk Liška
- Distributed by: United Artists
- Release date: July 28, 1970
- Running time: 106 minutes
- Country: United States
- Language: English

The Angel Levine is a 1970 American drama film directed by Ján Kadár and starring Zero Mostel, Harry Belafonte, Ida Kamińska, Milo O'Shea, and Gloria Foster. It is based on a short story by Bernard Malamud about Morris Mishkin, an elderly, impoverished New York City tailor who becomes unable to work due to health problems. His wife has also been seriously ill for two years, and their situation is now desperate. The tailor's Jewish faith, or lack of it, is challenged when a man calling himself Alexander Levine enters his life, claiming to be his guardian angel. Levine says that he must make the tailor believe in his mission, or fail to earn his angelic wings.

== Plot ==
Morris Mishkin is a poor Jewish tailor struggling through a difficult life. The pain in his back keeps him from holding down a job, his daughter has run away, and his wife, Fanny, suffers from heart disease. While still waiting on relief from a backlogged welfare system, Mishkin takes his last bit of savings to the grocery store for necessities. During his trek to the store he witnesses a robbery in which a black man steals a fur coat. Mishkin yells for the police, which alerts the thief, who then attempts a getaway but is struck and killed by a passing car while dashing across the street. When Mishkin gets back to his home he finds his wife growing continually worse, and he curses the Lord for his troubles.

As Mishkin turns to his kitchen, he sees the black thief who was killed in the street, standing there. The mysterious man claims to be a Jewish angel in training going by the name of Alexander Levine. Levine says that he must perform a miracle within 24 hours to be promoted to accepted status as an angel. Mishkin does not believe Levine, but Fanny's health suddenly improves. Mishkin still disbelieves it is a miracle, or that God is showing mercy. When Levine's 24 hours have expired, he leaves the Mishkin household, only for Fanny's condition to revert and worsen. Mishkin has a change of heart, and rushes to the streets of Harlem in search of Levine. He finally enters a local synagogue, but finds only a single black feather, floating in the air which he feebly attempts to catch.

== Cast ==
- Zero Mostel as Morris Mishkin
- Harry Belafonte as Alexander Levine
- Ida Kamińska as Fanny Mishkin
- Milo O'Shea as Dr. Arnold Berg
- Gloria Foster as Sally
- Barbara Ann Teer as Welfare Lady
- Eli Wallach as Delicatessen Clerk
- Anne Jackson as Woman in Delicatessen
- Stephen Strimpell as Drugstore Clerk
- Sam Raskyn as Druggist
- Kathy Shawn as Woman in Drugstore

== Production ==
The Angel Levine was brought to the screen by Belafonte, who produced the film as his own return to movies after more than ten years. The story was adapted by Emmy nominated writer Ronald Ribman and Bill Gunn, who had written the satire The Landlord (1970), "a well-received and complex examination of American race relations." Hal Erickson remarks that while "Bernard Malamud seldom saw his works faithfully transferred to the screen...he issued no complaints over the cinemazation of his Angel Levine."

== Reception ==
The Angel Levine was poorly received when it was first released, with Roger Greenspun of The New York Times stating that "given the reputations of the talents involved, [the film is] a failure of major proportions. I have seen worse movies. But I cannot remember having seen a movie so nervously at odds with itself, so timid in its impulses, and so mistaken in its choices."

When the film was released on DVD in 2002, Glenn Erickson of DVD Talk commented: "The Angel Levine is one of dozens of interesting movies in the United Artists library that seem to have been created for the purpose of being obscure.”

Tana Hobart considers the film poorly served by its writing but saved by the actors: "With a hackneyed plotline almost lifted intact from It's a Wonderful Life, this is still a worthwhile movie due to the appeal and acting ability of the cast."

== See also ==
- List of American films of 1970
- List of films about angels
