= One Silver Piece =

1976 film

- Directed by: Jaroslav Balík
- Starring: Anatolij Kuzněcov
- Release date: 1976
- Running time: 97 minutes
- Country: Czechoslovakia
- Language: Czech

One Silver Piece (Czech: Jeden stříbrný) is a 1976 Czechoslovak drama film directed by Jaroslav Balík. It was selected as the Czechoslovak entry for the Best Foreign Language Film at the 49th Academy Awards, but was not accepted as a nominee.

== Cast ==
- Anatolij Kuzněcov as Laco Tatar (as Anatolij Kuznecov)
- Emil Horváth as Martin Uher
- Július Vasek as Gabor
- Ferdinand Kruta as Matej Korínek
- Miroslav Moravec as Forman

== See also ==
- List of submissions to the 49th Academy Awards for Best Foreign Language Film
- List of Czechoslovak submissions for the Academy Award for Best Foreign Language Film
