= Vojtech, Called the Orphan =

1990 film

- Directed by: Zdeněk Tyc
- Written by: Zdeněk Tyc
- Starring: Petr Forman
- Release date: October 1990
- Running time: 80 minutes
- Country: Czechoslovakia
- Language: Czech

Vojtech, Called the Orphan (Czech: Vojtěch, řečený sirotek) is a 1990 Czechoslovak drama film directed by Zdeněk Tyc. The film was selected as the Czechoslovak entry for the Best Foreign Language Film at the 63rd Academy Awards, but was not accepted as a nominee.

== Cast ==
- Petr Forman as Vojta
- Barbora Lukešová as Anezka
- Jana Dolanská as Blazena
- Vlastimil Zavřel as Lojza
- Jirí Hájek as Caretaker
- Břetislav Rychlík as Venca
- Jaroslav Mareš as Juz

== See also ==
- List of submissions to the 63rd Academy Awards for Best Foreign Language Film
- List of Czechoslovak submissions for the Academy Award for Best Foreign Language Film
