= Ian Finkel =

American musician (1948–2020)

Ian Lawrence Finkel
- Ian Finkel playing the xylophone

Background information
- Born: August 13, 1948; Brooklyn, New York, U.S.
- Died: November 16, 2020 (aged 72) New York City, U.S.
- Instrument: Xylophone
- Spouse: Cheryl Ann Allen

Ian Lawrence Finkel (August 13, 1948 – November 16, 2020) was an American musician specializing in the xylophone, author, and entertainer.

== Early life and education ==
Finkel was the son of Fyvush Finkel, and Gertrude (Lieberman) Finkel. His brother, Elliot Finkel, is also a known entertainer. The brothers performed as the comedic-duet the Finkel Boys.

Finkel attended Mannes School of Music at the New School and was a student of Walter Rosenberger. He also studied under Norman Grossman.

== Career ==
Finkel was known as one of the world’s greatest xylophone virtuosos. He was the musical director for Michael Feinstein. He also worked for Sid Caesar, Tito Puente, and Ginger Roberts. He played with the New York Philharmonic and played with orchestras that accompanied Whitney Houston, Michael Jackson, and Diana Ross. He had concert tours in Japan, Korea, Canada, Mexico, England, and America.

He was the editor of Solos for the Vibraphone Player and the writer of plays and musicals including Sophie Tucker in Person. His books include Three is The Charm, Sex Stories My Wife Told Me, and Transmutation Blues and Vaudeville 1922, and numerous short stories. In 2009, he authored the humorous book, You're Not Suppose to Be Here.

== Personal life ==
Finkel was married to Cheryl Ann Allen. The couple had two children.

He died of complications of COVID-19 in Manhattan, on November 16, 2020, aged 72, after battling the virus since March while hospitalized for a stroke.
