= Flying Clipper (1962 film) =

1962 West German travelogue film

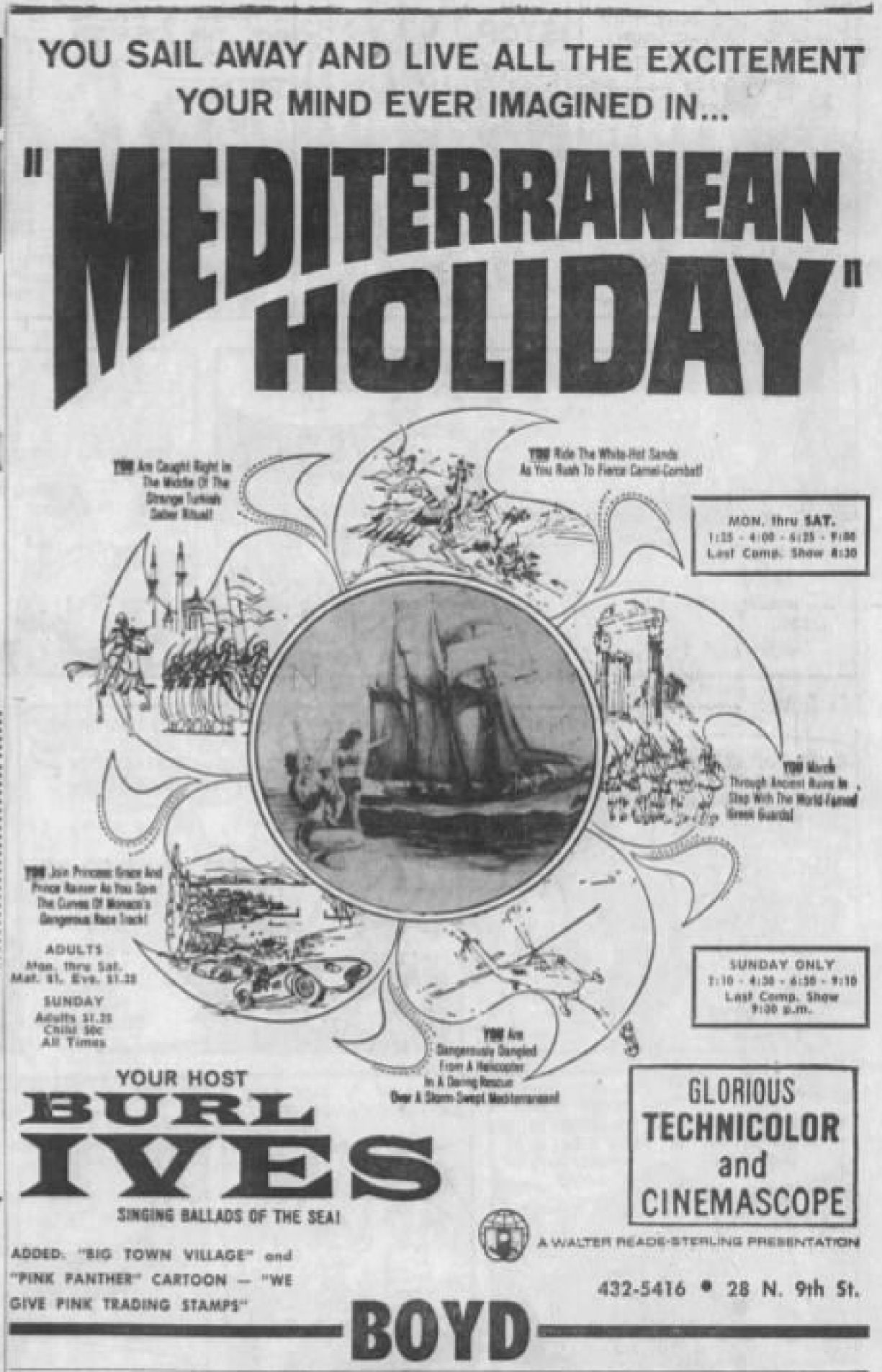
- American 1965 newspaper advertisement using the US title
- Directed by: Hermann Leitner; Rudolf Nussgruber
- Written by: Karl Hartl
- Produced by: Rudolf Travnicek
- Narrated by: Hans Clarin (German); Burl Ives (English)
- Cinematography: Tony Braun; Siegfried Hold; Heinz Hölscher; Klaus König; Bernhard Stebich
- Edited by: Karl Hartl
- Music by: Riz Ortolani
- Release date: 19 December 1962
- Running time: 158 minutes
- Country: West Germany
- Language: German

Flying Clipper (German: Traumreise unter weißen Segeln, lit. 'A Dream Trip Under White Sails') is a 1962 West German travelogue film directed by Hermann Leitner and Rudolf Nussgruber. It depicts the travels of the Swedish ship Flying Clipper and its merchant marine crew, who sail to various landmarks, both ancient and modern, around the Mediterranean coast. Countries visited include Portugal, Yugoslavia, Egypt (the Great Pyramid of Giza), Lebanon, Turkey (the Hagia Sophia), Greece (the Acropolis of Athens), France (the French Riviera), Monaco (the Monaco Grand Prix), and Spain.

The film premiered in Munich on 19 December 1962; it was the first German film to be shot in 70 mm. A dubbed version, retitled Mediterranean Holiday, was released in the United States by Continental Film Distributors in 1964.

== Cast ==
- Hans Clarin as narrator (German-language version)
- Burl Ives as narrator (English-language version)
- Graham Hill as himself
- Grace Kelly as herself (as Princess Grace of Monaco)
- Begum Aga Khan III as herself (as Die Begum)
- King Constantine II as himself (as Prince Constantine of Greece)
- Prince Rainier of Monaco as himself

== Production ==
Producer Rudolf Travnicek had originally intended for the film to be a sequel to Windjammer (1958), with the working title being "Windjammer 2". However, Cinemiracle International Pictures, the producers of Windjammer, sued Travnicek, forcing him to change its name to Flying Clipper.

Instead of Cinerama (the format previously used on Windjammer, which involved projecting onto a curved screen), Travnicek decided to film in the easier-to-handle 70 mm format. However, it was too expensive to rent 70 mm cameras from the only two companies that produced them, so engineer Jan Jacobsen was hired to develop an entirely new camera, the MCS-70. It was much smaller than the existing cameras, and so could be mounted under small aircraft and on top of cars.

Street-level scenes of the Monaco Grand Prix took place during qualifying laps, where a Mercedes-Benz 300 SL equipped with the MCS-70 was allowed to drive amongst the Formula One cars on the Circuit de Monaco.

There were no film labs in Germany at the time that could process 70 mm film, which used Eastman Color positive and negative stock, so it had to be sent to Technicolor Limited in London to be printed.

== Release ==
Flying Clipper had its world premiere on 19 December 1962 at the Royal-Palast in Munich, Germany. It played in competition at the 3rd Moscow International Film Festival. For its release in the United States, Continental Film Distributors renamed the film Mediterranean Holiday and produced it in various formats, including 35mm CinemaScope, 70mm Super Cinerama, and CineVision.

In 2017, German label Busch Media Group released a restoration in Blu-ray and 4K UHD Blu-ray, which was scanned from an original 70mm negative held in the German Federal Film Archive. The data from the full scan totaled 30 terabytes, with each frame being 6–8 megabytes in size. It took months for scratches and dust to be erased and color to be corrected; the original theatrical sound was restored as six-channel audio, with a new Dolby Atmos soundtrack also being produced. Busch later partnered with distributor Flicker Alley to release both versions as a single package in the US in 2019.
