= The Shop on Main Street =

1965 Czechoslovak film

- Film poster
- Directed by: Ján Kadár; Elmar Klos
- Written by: Ladislav Grosman; Ján Kadár; Elmar Klos
- Based on: The Shop on Main Street by Ladislav Grosman
- Starring: Ida Kamińska; Jozef Kroner; Hana Slivková; Martin Hollý, Sr. František Zvarík; Martin Gregor
- Cinematography: Vladimír Novotný
- Edited by: Diana Heringová; Jaromír Janáček
- Music by: Zdeněk Liška
- Production company: Barrandov Studios
- Release date: 8 October 1965
- Running time: 125 minutes
- Country: Czechoslovakia
- Languages: Slovak; Yiddish
- Box office: $1,450,000 (US/ Canada)

The Shop on Main Street (Czech/Slovak: Obchod na korze; in the UK The Shop on the High Street) is a 1965 Czechoslovak film about the Aryanization program during World War II in the Slovak Republic.

The film was written by Ladislav Grosman and directed by Ján Kadár and Elmar Klos. It was funded by the Czechoslovak central authorities, produced at the Barrandov Film Studio in Prague, and filmed with a Slovak cast on location in the town of Sabinov in north-eastern Slovakia and on the Barrandov sound stage. It stars Jozef Kroner as the Slovak carpenter Tóno Brtko and Polish actress Ida Kamińska as the Jewish widow Rozália Lautmannová.

The film won the 1965 Academy Award for Best Foreign Language Film, and Kamińska was nominated one year later for Best Actress in a Leading Role, making her the first Polish actress to be nominated for an Oscar. It was entered into the 1965 Cannes Film Festival.

== Plot ==
During World War II in a small town in the First Slovak Republic (a client state of Nazi Germany), mild-mannered Slovak carpenter Antonín "Tóno" Brtko is chosen by his brother-in-law, who holds an influential position in the local fascist government, to take over the sewing notions (i.e. haberdasher) shop owned by the elderly Jewish widow Rozália Lautmannová as part of the Aryanization efforts in the country. While Brtko is struggling to explain to Lautmannová, who is nearly deaf, oblivious to the outside world, and generally confused, that he is now her supervisor, Imrich Kuchár, Brtko's friend and a Slovak who opposes Aryanization, enters and informs Brtko that the business is unprofitable and Lautmannová relies on donations to make ends meet. Kuchár tells Lautmannová that Brtko has come to help her and connects Brtko with the leadership of the Jewish community of the town, who agree to pay him a regular salary to remain the official Aryan controller of the shop, since, if he quits, he might be replaced by someone more militantly fascist or antisemitic.

Brtko lets Lautmannová continue to run things in her shop, spending most of his time fixing her furniture or ineptly trying to assist her with customers, and the pair begin to develop a close relationship. When he hears that the authorities are going to gather the Jewish citizenry of the town and transport them elsewhere en masse, he does not tell Lautmannová and at first considers hiding her, but he starts to question this course of action when the roundup actually begins. Drinking steadily, he eventually loses his nerve and attempts to cajole and then force Lautmannová to join her friends in the street. She finally recognizes that a pogrom is happening and panics. Brtko chases her around inside the shop, but he stops and feels ashamed of himself after he witnesses his other Jewish neighbors actually being carted away. Seeing some soldiers heading toward the shop, he throws Lautmannová, who is in a frenzy, into a closet to hide her. The soldiers just glance in the window and keep walking. When Brtko opens the closet door, he discovers Lautmannová's dead body, (Note: It is not made explicit whether she died from injuries sustained when Brtko threw her into the closet, an adverse health event brought on by the stress of the situation, or a combination of the two.) and, devastated, hangs himself. The movie ends with a fantasy sequence in which the now deceased Lautmannová and Brtko run and dance through the town square together.

== Cast ==
Actor	Role
Jozef Kroner (1924–1998)	Antonín "Tóno" Brtko, a carpenter
Ida Kamińska (1899–1980)	Rozália Lautmannová, a button-store owner
Hana Slivková (1923–1984)	Evelína Brtková, Tóno's wife
Martin Hollý Sr. (1904–1965)	Imrich Kuchár, a friend of Tóno & Rozália and a member of the resistance
František Zvarík (1921–2008)	Markuš Kolkotský, Tóno's brother-in-law and the town commander
Elena Pappová-Zvaríková (1935–1974)	Ružena "Róžika" Kolkotská, Markuš' wife and Evelína's sister
Adam Matejka (1905–1988)	Piti-báči (Uncle Piti), the town crier
Martin Gregor (1906–1982)	Mr. Katz, a barber
František Papp (1930–1983)	Mr. Andorič, Rozália's neighbor and a railroad employee
Gita Mišurová (b. 1929)	Mrs. Andoričová, Mr. Andorič's wife
Eugen Senaj (1901–1981)	Mr. Blau, a publisher and the Jewish community treasurer
Lujza Grossová (1917–1981)	Mrs. Eliášová, Rozália's neighbor
J. Mittelmann	Daniel "Danko" Eliáš, Mrs. Eliášová's son
Mikuláš Ladžinský (1923–1987)	Marian Peter, a paramilitary guard officer
Alojz Kramár (1916–1985)	Balko-báči (Uncle Balko), a brass-band conductor
Tibor Vadaš (1908–1987)	Tobacconist

The Shop on Main Street was filmed on location at the town of Sabinov in north-eastern Slovakia with numerous local extras, whose voices bring in hints of the eastern regional variety of Slovak. Ida Kamińska's Polish accent is employed to the same effect.

== Screenplay ==
The screenplay had a bilingual Czech/Slovak history. The screenwriter Ladislav Grosman (1921–1981) was born and grew up in Slovakia, but he was writing in Czech at that point in his career. He published the short story "The Trap" ("Past"), a precursor to the screenplay that contained three themes that made it into the final film, in Czech in 1962. He reworked and expanded this story, still in Czech, as a literary-narrative screenplay that was published in 1964 under the title "The Shop on Main Street" (Obchod na korze). This version contained what would become the film's storyline, but it was not in a typical (American) screenplay format. Grosman reworked it into a shooting script with Slovak dialogue in cooperation with the film's designated directors, Ján Kadár and Elmar Klos.

The only other language in the film, other than Slovak, is Yiddish (which is sometimes misidentified as German), though this is limited to several lines that Mrs. Lautmannová mutters to herself. Her Hebrew reading from the siddur is indistinct.

== Production ==
The film was a collaborative effort between the Czechoslovak Socialist Republic and the Socialist Federal Republic of Yugoslavia. This collaboration was primarily due to the difficulties faced by the filmmakers in securing funding and logistical support within Czechoslovakia. Yugoslavia offered both financial support and access to locations that closely resembled the wartime Slovak setting of the story. The main filming location was the scenic village of Sabinov in Slovakia, which made the ideal setting for the fictional town portrayed in the movie.

== Score ==
The score was composed by Zdenek Liska. It incorporates traditional brass band style music that would have been common in Czechoslovakia during the 1940s. The soundtrack was released on record in the US—the first Czechoslovak movie soundtrack to see such a release.

== Critical response ==
Critics at the time praised the film for its profound exploration of the human psyche in the face of dire circumstances. On the review aggregator website Rotten Tomatoes, 100% of 15 critics' reviews are positive, with an average rating of 8.9/10. The Shop on Main Street was particularly lauded for its ability to navigate the delicate balance between humor and tragedy, often using dark humor to highlight the absurdity of the situation.

== See also ==
- List of Polish Academy Award winners and nominees
- List of submissions to the 38th Academy Awards for Best Foreign Language Film
- List of Czechoslovak submissions for the Academy Award for Best International Feature Film
- List of films featuring the deaf and hard of hearing
- List of Czech Academy Award winners and nominees
- BFI Top 100 British films
- Czechoslovak New Wave
