= Accused (1964 film) =

1964 film

The Defendant
- Directed by: Ján Kadár; Elmar Klos
- Written by: Vladimír Valenta, Ján Kadár, Elmar Klos
- Produced by: Ladislav Hanuš
- Starring: Vlado Müller
- Edited by: Jaromír Janáček
- Music by: Zdeněk Liška
- Production company: Barrandov Studios
- Release date: 25 February 1964
- Running time: 90 minutes
- Country: Czechoslovakia
- Language: Czech

The Defendant (Czech: Obžalovaný) is a 1964 film directed by Ján Kadár and Elmar Klos. The film won a Crystal Globe at 1964 Karlovy Vary International Film Festival.

== Plot ==
Three men are taken to the District court - Chairman Kurdrna, Engineer Potůček and Bureaucrat Zelenka. They are accused of stealing national property. Zelenka and Potůček are guilty and confessed. Kudrna on the other hand refuses guilt. He didn't steal any of the property and didn't know about actions of the other two. He is shocked when he finds out that his deputy Ludl who was responsible for finances committed suicide due to his guilt. He eventually realises that he is also responsible because he signed some illegal premies without reading those. Zelenka and Potůček are sentenced to a long time in prison while Kudrna's sentence is low and correspondents with his custody but Kudrna feels guilt and refuses avoiding punishment.

== Cast ==
- Vlado Müller as Josef Kudrna
- Zora Jiráková as Kudrna's mother
- Martin Štěpánek as Kudrna's son
- Jaroslav Blažek as a Chairman of Judicial Senate
- Pavel Bártl as Kábrt
- Milan Jedlička as František Duchoň
- Miroslav Macháček as Prosecutor
- Jiří Menzel as František Horáček
- Kamil Bešťák as Hruška
