= New Friendship =

1963 film

- Directed by: Ramón Comas
- Written by: Juan García Hortelano; Ramón Comas
- Starring: José Luis Albar
- Cinematography: Juan Julio Baena
- Release date: 16 September 1963
- Country: Spain
- Language: Spanish

New Friendship (Spanish: Nuevas amistades) is a 1963 Spanish drama film directed by Ramón Comas. It was entered into the 3rd Moscow International Film Festival.

== Cast ==
- José Luis Albar as Leopoldo
- María Andersen as Isabel
- Elena Balduque as Jovita
- Ángela Bravo as Julia
- Mer Casas as Neca
- Charo (as Charo Baeza)
