= 3rd Moscow International Film Festival =

Film festival

- Location: Moscow, Soviet Union
- Founded: 1959
- Awards: Grand Prix
- Festival date: 7–21 July 1963
- Website: http://www.moscowfilmfestival.ru

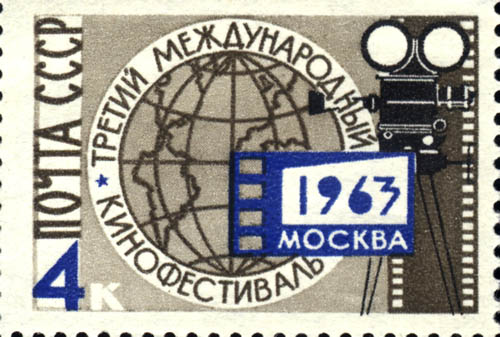
Stamp of the Moscow International Film Festival

The 3rd Moscow International Film Festival was held from 7 to 21 July 1963. The Grand Prix was awarded to the Italian film 8½ directed by Federico Fellini.

== Jury ==
- Grigori Chukhrai (USSR - President of the Jury)
- Shaken Aimanov (USSR)
- Sergio Amidei (Italy)
- Dušan Vukotić (Yugoslavia)
- Mohamed Kerim (Egypt)
- Stanley Kramer (USA)
- Jean Marais (France)
- Nelson Pereira dos Santos (Brazil)
- Emil Petrov (Bulgaria)
- Jan Procházka (Czechoslovakia)
- Satyajit Ray (India)
- Jan Rybkowski (Poland)
- Kiyohiko Ushihara (Japan)
- János Herskó (Hungary)

== Films in competition ==
The following films were selected for the main competition:

| English title | Original title | Director(s) | Production country |
|---|---|---|---|
| Shore of Waiting | Sahele entezar | Syamak Yasami | Iran |
| The Great Escape | The Great Escape | John Sturges | United States |
| The Marriage Circle | Saat Pake Bandha | Ajoy Kar | India |
| The Suitor | Le soupirant | Pierre Étaix | France |
| 8½ | Otto e mezzo | Federico Fellini | Italy, France |
| Changes in the Village | Gamperaliya | Lester James Peries | Ceylon |
| Naked Among Wolves | Nackt unter Wölfen | Frank Beyer | East Germany |
| The Twelve Chairs | Las doce sillas | Tomás Gutiérrez Alea | Cuba |
| Los signos del zodiaco | Los signos del zodiaco | Sergio Véjar | Mexico |
| Meet Baluyev! | Знакомьтесь, Балуев! | Victor Komissarjevski | Soviet Union |
| Bad Girl | Hiko shojo | Kirio Urayama | Japan |
| Kozara | Kozara | Veljko Bulajić | Yugoslavia |
| Flying Clipper | Flying Clipper – Traumreise unter weißen Segeln | Hermann Leitner, Rudolf Nussgruber | West Germany |
| Lupeni 29 | Lupeni 29 | Mircea Drăgan | Romania |
| The Boys | Pojat | Mikko Niskanen | Finland |
| Den kære familie | Den kære familie | Erik Balling | Denmark |
| The Silent Raid | De overval | Paul Rotha | Netherlands |
| The Beggars | Os Mendigos | Flávio Migliaccio | Brazil |
| New Friendship | Nuevas amistades | Ramón Comas | Spain |
| Ah, These Girls! | Ene huuhnuu duu | Ravjagiin Dorjpalam | Mongolia |
| Salladin the Victorious | الناصر صلاح الدين, Al Nasser Salah Ad-Din | Youssef Chahine | Egypt |
| A Trip Without a Load | Порожний рейс, Porozhniy reys | Vladimir Vengerov | Soviet Union |
| Tales of a Long Journey | Legenda a vonaton | Tamás Rényi | Hungary |
| Death Is Called Engelchen | Smrt si říká Engelchen | Ján Kadár, Elmar Klos | Czechoslovakia |
| The Dragonfly Is Not an Insect | La Cigarra no es un bicho | Daniel Tinayre | Argentina |
| Sammy Going South | Sammy Going South | Alexander Mackendrick | Great Britain |
| Those Who Take Risks | Die ihre Haut zu Markte tragen a.k.a. Deutschland – deine Sternchen | Edwin Zbonek | Austria, West Germany |
| Tоha, the Hero of South Bandung | Toha, Pahlawan Bandung Selatan | Usmar Ismail, N. D. Afifi | Indonesia |
| Mrs. Tu Hau | Chị Tư Hậu | Phạm Kỳ Nam | North Vietnam |
| Cold Tracks | Kalde spor | Arne Skouen | Norway |
| Black Wings | Czarne skrzydla | Ewa Petelska, Czesław Petelski | Poland |
| Adventures of Nils Holgersson | Nils Holgerssons underbara resa | Kenne Fant | Sweden |
| Stranger in the City | Şehirdeki Yabancı | Halit Refiğ | Turkey |
| Chouchou and the Million | Chouchou wa al million | Issam Hamawi | Lebanon |

== Awards ==
- Grand Prix: 8½ by Federico Fellini
- Golden Prizes:
  - Death Is Called Engelchen by Ján Kadár and Elmar Klos
  - Kozara by Veljko Bulajić
  - Bad Girl by Kirio Urayama
- Special Silver Prize: Frank Beyer for Naked Among Wolves
- Silver Prizes:
  - A Trip Without a Load by Vladimir Vengerov
  - Tales of a Long Journey by Tamás Rényi
  - Black Wings by Ewa Petelska and Czesław Petelski
  - Chi Tu Hau by Pham Ky Nam
  - Lupeni 29 by Mircea Drăgan
  - Best Actor: Steve McQueen for The Great Escape
  - Best Actress: Suchitra Sen for Saat Paake Bandha
  - Director of Photography: Jørgen Skov for Den kære familie
- Special Diploma: Pierre Étaix for The Suitor
- Prix FIPRESCI: The Four Days of Naples by Nanni Loy
