= Mr. Terrific (TV series) =

American television sitcom

- Genre: Sitcom
- Directed by: Byron Chudnow; Arthur Lubin; Jack Arnold
- Starring: Stephen Strimpell; Dick Gautier; Paul Smith; John McGiver
- Voices of: Paul Frees
- Theme music composer: Gerald Fried
- Country of origin: United States
- Original language: English
- No. of seasons: 1
- No. of episodes: 17 (+1 unaired pilot)

Production
- Executive producer: Jack Arnold
- Producer: Budd Grossman
- Running time: 25 minutes
- Production company: Universal Television

Original release
- Network: CBS
- Release: January 9 – May 8, 1967

Mr. Terrific is an American television sitcom that aired on CBS on Mondays at 8:00 p.m., from January 9 to August 28, 1967. Stephen Strimpell starred in the title role. A similar series on NBC, Captain Nice, also aired that season on Mondays, at 8:30 p.m.

The show was an attempt to capitalize on the "camp superhero" craze sparked by the success of the 1966 Batman TV series.

== Premise ==
Riding the tide of the camp superhero craze of the 1960s, the show's premise involved gas station attendant Stanley Beamish (Strimpell), a mild-mannered scrawny youth who secretly worked to fight crime for a government organization, "The Bureau of Secret Projects," in Washington. All he needed to do was to take a "power pill" which gave him the strength of a thousand men and enabled him to fly, much like Superman, albeit by furious flapping while wearing the top half of a wingsuit. To the often-lamented misfortune of the Bureau of Secret Projects, he was the only person on whom the pills worked. It was established that, although the pill would give him high strength levels, he was still vulnerable to bullets. Furthermore, each power pill had a time limit of one hour (like Underdog and DC Comics's Hourman), although he generally had two 10-minute booster pills available per episode. Much of the show's humor revolved around the tendency of the amiable yet gullible Beamish to lose Mr. Terrific's powers at inopportune times, before he completed his given assignment.

Beamish's government employers were Mr. Barton J. Reed and Mr. Harley Trent, and his day-job partner at the service station was Hal Walters. Beamish was sworn to secrecy concerning his alter-ego and super-powers.

Alan Young, who had just completed his run as Wilbur Post on Mister Ed, was the original choice to play Stanley H. Beamish, and appeared in the original 1966 unaired version of the pilot, which featured a different supporting cast (Edward Andrews as The Chief, All Checco as Dr. Kramer, Dick Merrifield as Tony Lawrence, Sheilah Wells as Gloria Dickinson, and Jesse White as Mr. Finney).

== Cast members ==
- Stanley Beamish/Mister Terrific: Stephen Strimpell.
- Barton J. Reed: John McGiver.
- Hal Walters: Dick Gautier.
- Harley Trent: Paul Smith.

== Episode list ==
Episode #	Episode title	Original airdate	Plot
1-1	"Matchless"	January 9, 1967	Mr. Terrific must locate the inventor of a hotly-pursued Power Paralysis device, unaware that the device is concealed in a book of matches in his coat pocket.
1-2	"Mr. Big Curtsies Out"	January 16, 1967	Stanley is assigned to locate and identify an elusive and mysterious crime boss known only as "Mr. Big" — who turns out to be a woman.
1-3	"I Can't Fly"	January 23, 1967	When a distress call arrives about a malfunctioning Air Force One that Mr. Terrific could repair easily, Stanley discovers that his power pills inexplicably have stopped working.
1-4	"My Partner, the Jewel Thief"	January 30, 1967	Concerned that Stanley's behavior suggests that Stanley may be turning into a criminal, Hal decides to block Stanley from any wrongdoing — and keeps getting in the way of Stanley stopping a major jewel heist.
1-5	"The Formula Is Stolen"	February 6, 1967	Spies steal Mr. Terrific's power-pill formula, and because the pills only work on Stanley, the thieves also need to kidnap Stanley, brainwash him, and sell him to the highest bidder.
1-6	"Stanley the Safecracker"	February 20, 1967	The government sends Stanley on a mission to catch a crime gang that requires him to impersonate a safecracker who looks exactly like him, fool the man's girlfriend, and somehow convince the gang that he knows how to break into bank vaults.
1-7	"Stanley the Fighter"	February 27, 1967	Stanley goes undercover as a boxer to obtain evidence that a gymnasium is actually a front for a counterfeiting ring.
1-8	"Stanley the Jailbreaker"	March 6, 1967	To find out where $2 million in stolen money is hidden, Stanley goes undercover as "Slippery Sloan" to help bank robber "Blackjack" Clayton escape from prison so that Clayton will trust Stanley enough to tell him where the money is.
1-9	"Fly, Ballerina, Fly"	March 13, 1967	Stanley poses as a ballet dancer to help a Soviet prima ballerina defect to the United States, but he grabs the wrong woman. Barrie Chase guest-stars.
1-10	"Harley and the Killer"	March 20, 1967	Stanley tries to protect Harley Trent after an escaped murderer vows to kill Trent for prosecuting him.
1-11	"Stanley and the Mountaineers"	March 27, 1967	Stanley is assigned to infiltrate a family of mountain moonshiners, and Hal ends up headed for a shotgun wedding.
1-12	"Has Mr. Terrific Sold Out?"	April 3, 1967	When a dignitary visits, enemy agents abduct Stanley, and Reed and Trent are concerned that he might betray the United States and its allies for his own financial gain.
1-13	"Stanley Goes To the Dentist"	April 10, 1967	Stanley goes undercover to investigate a dentist who seems to be successfully prying U. S. Government secrets from normally reliable agents.
1-14	"Stanley the Track Star"	April 17, 1967	Stanley is assigned to learn the location of a U. S. track and field champion enemy agents have kidnapped.
1-15	"Try This On For Spies"	April 24, 1967	Stanley is assigned to let the enemy get their hands on fake plans for a missile system, but a mix-up causes him to give them the actual plans, and he must figure out a way to get them back.
1-16	"Stanley Joins the Circus"	May 1, 1967	Stanley goes undercover as a circus strongman to discover which of the show's performers stole a government code book and to get the book back.
1-17	"The Sultan Has Five Wives"	May 8, 1967	Stanley is assigned to discreetly protect the polygamous sultan of an oil-rich Middle Eastern nation.

== The Pill Caper ==
- Episodes 1, 3, 5 and 9 of Mr. Terrific were edited together and combined with new footage filmed in 1967 to create a movie titled The Pill Caper, which was released in 1967. Hal Smith has a cameo in The Pill Caper as a passenger on a train.

== DVD release ==
The entire 17-episode series of Mr. Terrific was released commercially on DVD by Ufa/DVD in Germany under the title Immer wenn er Pillen nahm (Whenever He Took Pills) on July 17, 2009. The episodes can be heard in the original English, or in German.
