= Hermann Leitner =

Austrian film director and film editor (1927–2013)

- Born: 3 September 1927; Salzburg, Austria
- Died: 22 February 2013 (aged 85)
- Occupation: Film director
- Years active: 1949-1997

Hermann Leitner (3 September 1927 – 22 February 2013) was an Austrian film editor and film director. His 1962 documentary film Flying Clipper was entered into the 3rd Moscow International Film Festival.

== Selected filmography ==
Editor

- Viennese Girls (1945)
- Shadows Over Naples (1951)
- Captive Soul (1952)
- I Can't Marry Them All (1952)
- Queen of the Arena (1952)
- Shame on You, Brigitte! (1952)
- Lady's Choice (1953)
- Hit Parade (1953)
- The Empress of China (1953)
- Not Afraid of Big Animals (1953)
- Hooray, It's a Boy! (1953)
- The Flower of Hawaii (1953)
- Emil and the Detectives (1954)
- Victoria in Dover (1954)
- It Was Always So Nice With You (1954)
- The Beautiful Miller (1954)
- Love is Forever (1954)
- Love Is Just a Fairytale (1955)
- The Three from the Filling Station (1955)
- Wenn der Vater mit dem Sohne (1955)
- Charley's Aunt (1956)

Director

- Ferien auf Immenhof (1957)
- Nature Girl and the Slaver (1957)
- Lilli (1958)
- Glück und Liebe in Monaco (1959)
- Verdammt die jungen Sünder nicht (1961)
- Flying Clipper (1962)
- Drei Frauen im Haus (1968–1969, TV series)
- Der Kurier der Kaiserin (1970–1971, TV series)
- Die Melchiors (1972, TV series)
- Kein Abend wie jeder andere (1976, TV film)
- Sun, Wine and Hard Nuts (1977–1981, TV series)
- Waldheimat (1983–1984, TV series)
- ...Erbin sein - dagegen sehr (1985, TV series)
- Roda Roda (1992–1993, TV series)
- Blankenese (1994, TV series)

== Bibliography ==
- Körner, Torsten. Der kleine Mann als Star: Heinz Rühmann und seine Filme der 50er Jahre. Campus Verlag, 2001.
