= Death Is Called Engelchen =

1963 film

- Film poster
- Directed by: Ján Kadár; Elmar Klos
- Written by: Miloš Faber
- Starring: Jan Kačer
- Cinematography: Rudolf Milič
- Music by: Zdeněk Liška
- Distributed by: Ústřední půjčovna filmů Kouzlo Films Společnost
- Release date: 3 May 1963
- Running time: 129 minutes
- Country: Czechoslovakia
- Language: Czech

Death Is Called Engelchen (Slovak: Smrt sa volá Engelchen) is a 1963 Czechoslovak war film directed by Ján Kadár and Elmar Klos. It was entered into the 3rd Moscow International Film Festival where it won a Golden Prize.

== Plot ==
At the end of the Second World War, Zlín is liberated by the advancing Soviet army. A young Czechoslovak partisan named Pavel was injured in a gunfight with Germans and lies in hospital. He is paralyzed and while recovering, he spends his days by lying on his back. He recalls memories from his life during the war - his experience as a resistance fighter, his comrades, his fights with Germans in Slovak mountains and his love, Marta, who acted as a spy for the resistance. He also remembers Engelchen, an SS Sturmbannführer who was responsible for the deaths of many of Pavel's friends, and for the massacres of two mountain villages. Marta comes to visit Pavel in the hospital to say goodbye. Her work as a spy has made her look like a German collaborator to some and it has earned her hatred of him. After some time, Pavel recovers and leaves the hospital to find Engelchen.

== Cast ==
- Jan Kačer as Pavel
- Eva Poláková as Marta
- Martin Růžek as Doktor
- Blažena Holišová as Schwester Alžběta
- Otto Lackovič as Ondra
- Norbert Chotas as Engelchen
