= The Glass Cage (1965 film) =

1965 film

- Film poster
- Directed by: Philippe Arthuys; Jean-Louis Levi-Alvarès
- Written by: Philippe Arthuys
- Produced by: Jean-Pierre Barot
- Starring: Georges Rivière
- Cinematography: George Pessis
- Music by: Philippe Arthuys
- Release date: 1965
- Running time: 85 minutes
- Countries: Israel; France
- Languages: Hebrew; French

The Glass Cage (French: La cage de verre) is a 1965 internationally co-produced drama film directed by Philippe Arthuys and Jean-Louis Levi-Alvarès and written by Arthuys. The film was selected as the Israeli entry for the Best Foreign Language Film at the 38th Academy Awards, but was not accepted as a nominee. It was also entered into the 4th Moscow International Film Festival.

== Cast ==
- Georges Rivière as Claude
- Jean Négroni as Pierre
- Françoise Prévost
- Maurice Poli as Antoine
- Dina Doron as Sonia
- Azaria Rapaport as Journalist
- Rina Ganor as Tamar
- Natan Cogan as Doctor

== See also ==
- List of submissions to the 38th Academy Awards for Best Foreign Language Film
- List of Israeli submissions for the Academy Award for Best Foreign Language Film
