= Tales of a Long Journey =

1963 film

- Directed by: Tamás Rényi
- Written by: Mihály Várkonyi
- Starring: Imre Sinkovits
- Cinematography: Ottó Forgács
- Release date: July 1963
- Running time: 79 minutes
- Country: Hungary
- Language: Hungarian

Tales of a Long Journey (Hungarian: Legenda a vonaton) is a 1963 Hungarian drama film directed by Tamás Rényi. It was entered into the 3rd Moscow International Film Festival where it won a Silver Prize.

== Cast ==
- Imre Sinkovits as Karló
- Ádám Szirtes as Doktor
- Ildikó Pécsi as Ica
- László Bánhidi as Zsiga (as Bánhidy László)
- József Madaras as Gugis
- István Sztankay as Lakatos
- Attila Lõte as Bónus Miklós
- József Kautzky as Monostori
- Gábor Koncz as Kulacs
- Dezsö Garas as Gál fõmérnök
- László György as Pribó
