= Philippe Arthuys =

French composer and film director

- Born: 22 November 1928; Paris, France
- Died: 6 January 2010 (aged 81)
- Occupations: Composer; Film director
- Years active: 1959–1997

Philippe Arthuys (22 November 1928 – 6 January 2010) was a French composer and film director. He worked on over 20 films between 1959 and 1997. His 1965 film The Glass Cage was entered into the 4th Moscow International Film Festival.

== Selected filmography ==
- The Glass Cage (1965)
