= Katalin Rényi =

Hungarian artist (1951–2023)

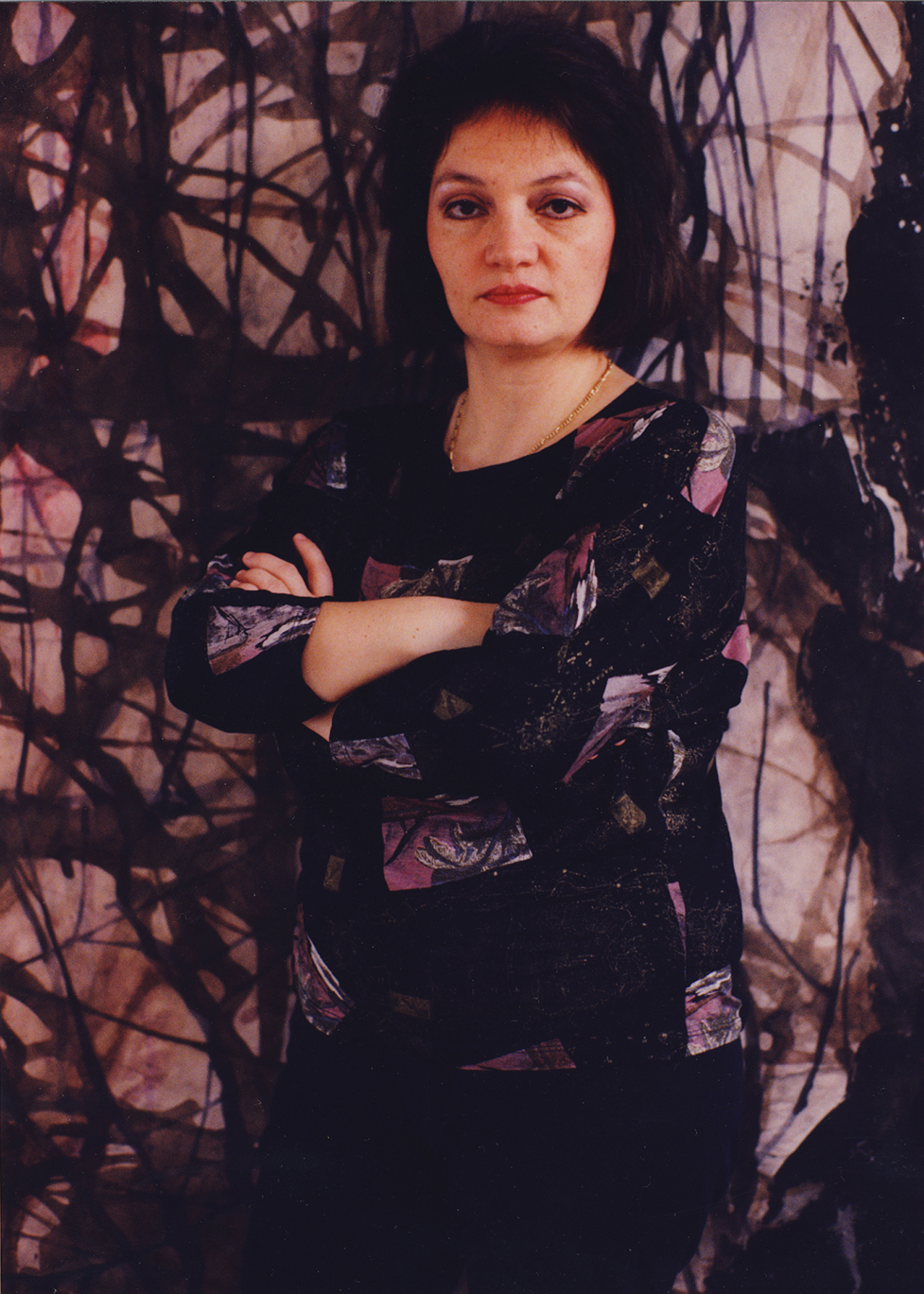
- Born: May 19, 1951; Budapest, Hungary
- Died: August 29, 2023 (aged 72)

Katalin Rényi ([ˈreːɲi ˈkɒtɒlin]; 19 May 1951 – 29 August 2023) was a Hungarian painter and graphic designer.

== Life and career ==
Rényi was born in Budapest on 19 May 1951. Her father was film director Tamás Rényi, whom she described as strict and critical. She was raised by her grandmother, and she attended the Secondary School of Fine and Applied Arts from 1965 to 1969. She graduated from the Hungarian University of Arts and Design (now the Moholy-Nagy University of Art and Design) in 1975 with a degree in graphic design. After graduating, she began a twenty-year career in advertisement design, specializing in movie posters.

Rényi married fellow artist József Baska in 1976. They had a son, Balázs, in 1978, and a daughter, Barbara, in 1984. Both children went on to become graphic artists and filmmakers. Baska and Rényi were instructors at the Hungarian University of Arts and Design, with Rényi taking a teaching position in 1985. She left graphic design when it became primarily digital. She instead painted independently, and she wrote poetry.

Rényi moved with her husband to Szentendre as he wished to be involved with the town's art colony. She was initially there as Baska's wife, but she was eventually invited to join them as an artist in her own right. Rényi held an art exhibition in 1992, and she founded the Montázs Drawing Studio in the same year. She and her husband also founded the annual artist camp, Csopaki Művésztelep. She held an exhibition titled "Giant Watercolours" in 1993, an exhibition titled "Kosovo I.N.R.I." in 1999, and further exhibitions in 2006, 2007, 2009, and 2012. She also held a family exhibition in 2012 with her husband and children titled "The Genetics of Art/Artist Family". She held an exhibition titled "Conjuring Spirits" in 2013.

Rényi was widowed with the death of Baska in 2017. According to her son, Baska's death prompted Rényi to distract herself with her work, producing art at five times her normal rate. In 2018, she held a retrospective exhibition across Europe titled "21 grams", in reference to the idea that the soul weighs 21 grams. This exhibition featured works related to religious themes and the meaning of life. For her career in art, she was awarded the Hungarian Order of Merit in 1994 and the Mihály Munkácsy Award in 2019.

Rényi died on 29 August 2023, at age 72.
