= Seize the Day (film) =

1986 film by Fielder Cook

- Directed by: Fielder Cook
- Written by: Ronald Ribman
- Starring: Robin Williams; Jerry Stiller; Joseph Wiseman; Richard B. Shull; Glenne Headly; Stephen Strimpell
- Cinematography: Eric Van Haren Noman
- Edited by: Sidney Katz
- Music by: Elizabeth Swados
- Production company: Learning In Focus
- Distributed by: HBO/Cannon Video
- Release dates: September 9, 1986 (Toronto International Film Festival); May 1, 1987 (U.S.)
- Running time: 93 minutes
- Country: United States
- Language: English

Seize the Day is a 1986 American drama film directed by Fielder Cook. It stars Robin Williams, Jerry Stiller and Joseph Wiseman, and is based on the novel of the same name by Saul Bellow. It was broadcast on the PBS series, Great Performances, in May 1987.

== Plot ==
In 1956, after losing his job as a traveling salesman of children's furniture, down-on-his-luck Tommy Wilhelm leaves Massachusetts for New York City. He is under financial strain because of the demands of his wife, from whom he is separated. He moves into the same hotel that houses his physician father, Dr. Adler, with whom he has a strained relationship.

Flashbacks show how Tommy moved to Los Angeles, changed his name, and tried to become an actor, which failed. His marriage failed, so he left his wife, and is estranged from their two sons.

In New York, Tommy becomes involved with Dr. Tamkin, an acquaintance of his father, who speculates in the commodities market. Tommy agrees to open an account managed by Tamkin on a 50–50 basis, but Tamkin persuades Tommy to put up most of the money. When prices decline and Tommy wants to cash in the account, Tamkin urges Tommy to remain calm and seize the day.

The commodities venture collapses, so Tommy has lost his life savings, and cannot even pay his hotel bill. His estranged wife is unsympathetic, and his father refuses to help him or even provide emotional support. Tommy tries to find Tamkin, who has vanished. He happens on a stranger's funeral, where he cries and is mistaken for a mourner.

== Cast ==
- Robin Williams as Tommy Wilhelm
- Jerry Stiller as Dr. Tamkin
- Joseph Wiseman as Dr. Adler
- Richard B. Shull as Rojax
- David Bickford as Son-in-Law
- Glenne Headly as Olive
- Stephen Strimpell as Stockbroker
- Katherine Borowitz as Margaret
- John Fiedler as Carl
- Jo Van Fleet as Mrs. Einhorn
- Allen Swift as Maurice Venice
- Tony Roberts as Bernie Pell
- Saul Bellow as man in hallway

== Production ==
Williams's casting in the role was billed as a sharp departure from his previous roles, most of which were comedic, such as the TV series, Mork and Mindy (although he had previously appeared in dramatic roles, including The World According to Garp). Williams described it as "kind of like a Jewish Greek drama". The movie was filmed in New York City during a period of 30 days, longer than most television movies on commercial networks at the time, but far shorter than the shooting schedule of a feature film.

The film was blocked from theatrical release by Williams's management company. The San Francisco Examiner reported that the decision was made because the film was not like the comedies for which Williams was known.

== Reception ==
The Philadelphia Inquirer critic, Ken Tucker, praised the performances, but wrote that the film was "a little boring in its relentless depression". The director, he wrote, was "all too willing to let a scene dawdle, the better to emphasize Tommy's torture".

A San Francisco Examiner critic called the film a "powerful drama" and a "remarkably faithful reproduction" of the Bellow novel, and praised the performances, calling Williams "first rate".

The New York Times critic, John J. O'Connor, praised Wiseman's performance, and said that Stiller "steals the film". But he criticized the casting of Robin Williams as too "Middle American" for a role as a Jewish New Yorker. He wrote that Williams's performance was excessively intense, and that the portrayal of Jewish people whose only yardstick is money is "a scenario calculated to unsettle, possibly even offend".

Writing in New York magazine, critic John Leonard called the film "ugly stuff", but said that Williams "is, for the most part, up to it".
