= Stephen Strimpell =

American actor

- Born: January 17, 1934; New York City, U.S.
- Died: April 10, 2006 (aged 72); Los Angeles, California, U.S.
- Occupation: Actor
- Years active: 1967–2006
- Known for: Playing Stanley Beamish in Mister Terrific

Stephen Strimpell (January 17, 1934 - April 10, 2006) was the star of the Universal Television series Mister Terrific.

== Personal life ==
Strimpell was born on January 17, 1934. He was a junior Phi Beta Kappa at Columbia College, a graduate of Columbia Law School, and a member of the New York Bar before embarking in earnest on his acting career. Well known for many years as a popular New York acting teacher at HB Studio and in his private classes, Strimpell was also an accomplished actor, having played the title role in The Disintegration of James Cherry at Lincoln Center and appearing in such off Broadway plays as To Be Young Gifted and Black and The Exhaustion of Our Son’s Love. At the American Shakespeare Festival he appeared in plays with Katharine Hepburn, among others, including Antony and Cleopatra, All's Well That Ends Well, Romeo and Juliet, Twelfth Night, The Merry Wives of Windsor, and A Midsummer Night’s Dream. He also had featured parts in over a dozen films, including Fitzwilly, Death Play, Jenny, The Angel Levine, Act One, and Hester Street. He directed at the Mark Taper Forum in Los Angeles, and appeared there in Douglas Campbell's 1968 production of The Miser with Hume Cronyn and Jessica Tandy.

== Television ==
When Stephen Strimpell moved to Los Angeles, his most famous role may have been in the 1967 CBS comedy series owned by Universal Television, Mister Terrific, filmed in Universal City at Universal Studios, in which he played Stanley Beamish, an innocent gas station attendant, who morphed into the title character, a superhero with an ability to fly. Although the series lasted only one season, it had a second life as a cult favorite. Strimpell's personal account of his experiences doing Mr. Terrific appears in a long article, "The amazing Mr. Terrific: How TV actor Stephen Strimpell Survived the ‘Flying Harness’ and Other Inane Hollywood Inventions".

== Death ==
On March 13, 2006, Stephen Strimpell suffered heart failure and cardiac arrest. He died on April 10, 2006.

== Filmography ==
Year	Title	Role	Notes
1967	Fitzwilly	Byron Casey	
1970	Jenny	Peter	
1970	The Angel Levine	Drugstore clerk	
1975	Hester Street	Joe Peltner	
1976	Death Play	Jerry	
1979	All That Jazz	Alvin Rackmil	
1982	A Stranger Is Watching	Detective Marlowe	
1985	Almost You	Lecturer	
1985	Hot Resort	Cruse	
1986	Seize the Day	Stockbroker	(final film role)
