= Jaroslav Balík =

Czechoslovak film director

- Born: 23 June 1924; Prague, Czechoslovakia (now Czech Republic)
- Died: 17 October 1996 (aged 72); Prague, Czech Republic
- Occupations: Film director, screenwriter
- Years active: 1952–1987

Jaroslav Balík (23 June 1924 – 17 October 1996) was a Czechoslovak film director and screenwriter. He directed 26 films between 1952 and 1987.

== Selected filmography ==
- Lovers in the Year One (1973)
- One Silver Piece (1976)
