= Elmar Klos =

Czech film director

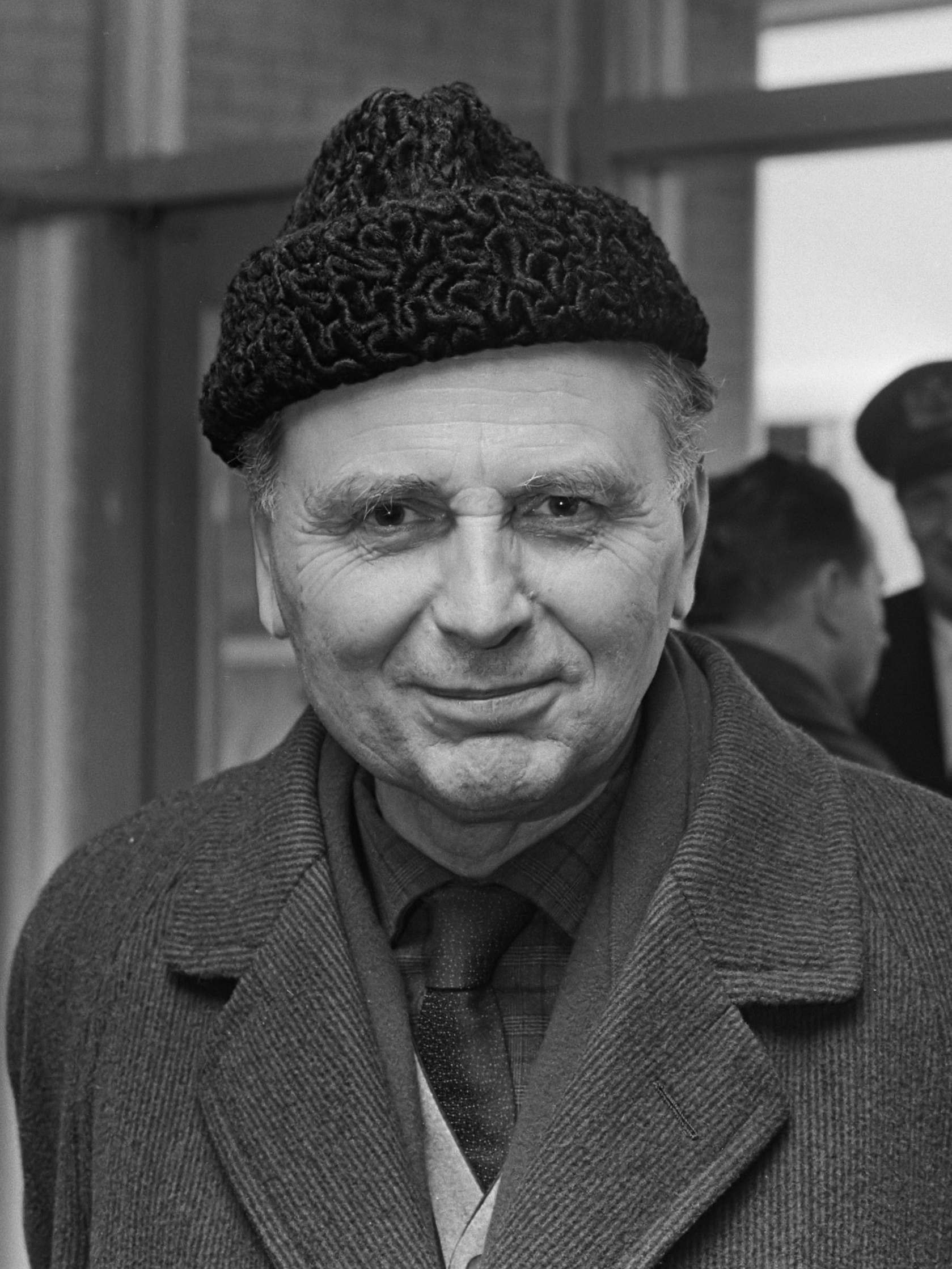
- Elmar Klos (1966)
- Born: 26 January 1910; Brno, Moravia, Austria-Hungary
- Died: 19 July 1993 (aged 83); Prague, Czech Republic
- Resting place: Vyšehrad Cemetery

Elmar Klos (26 January 1910 – 19 July 1993) was a Czech film director. He collaborated for 17 years with his Slovak colleague Ján Kadár and with him won the 1965 Oscar for Best Foreign Language Film for the film The Shop on Main Street.

They directed the 1963 film Death Is Called Engelchen, which entered into the 3rd Moscow International Film Festival and won a Golden Prize.

== Filmography ==
Year	Title	Director	Writer	Notes
1953	Kidnapped	Yes	Yes	
1955	Music from Mars	Yes	Yes	
1957	At the Terminus	Yes	Yes	
1958	Three Wishes	Yes	Yes	
1963	Death Is Called Engelchen	Yes	Yes	Won a Golden Prize at the 3rd Moscow International Film Festival
1964	Accused	Yes	Yes	Won a Crystal Globe at 1964 Karlovy Vary International Film Festival
1965	The Shop on Main Street	Yes	Yes	Won the 1965 Academy Award for Best Foreign Language Film
1971	Adrift	Yes	Yes	
1989	Bizon	Yes	No	
