= Ján Kadár =

Slovak film writer and director

- Born: János Kadár; 1 April 1918; Budapest, Austria-Hungary
- Died: 1 June 1979 (aged 61); Los Angeles, California, U.S.
- Occupations: Screenwriter, film director
- Years active: 1945–1979
- Spouse: Judita Kadár
- Awards: NY Critics Best Foreign Film Award; 1966 The Shop on Main Street; Canadian Etrog; 1976 Lies My Father Told Me; Golden Globe for Best Foreign Film; 1976 Lies My Father Told Me; Oscar for Best Foreign Film; 1966 The Shop on Main Street

Ján Kadár (1 April 1918 – 1 June 1979) was a Slovak film writer and director of Jewish heritage.

As a filmmaker, he worked in Czechoslovakia, the United States, and Canada. Most of his films were directed in tandem with Elmar Klos. The two became best known for their Oscar-winning The Shop on Main Street (Obchod na korze, 1965). As a professor at FAMU (Film and TV School of the Academy of Performing Arts) in Prague, Kadár trained most of the directors who spawned the Czechoslovak New Wave in the 1960s.

Kadár was a dean at the American Film Institute.

== Early years ==
Kadár was born in Budapest, Austria-Hungary (now Hungary). Later his family moved to Rožňava, in the newly created Czechoslovakia, where he grew up. His mother was Louisa Tyroler.

Kadár took up the law in Bratislava after high school, but soon transferred to the first Department of Film in Czechoslovakia (probably the third such department in Europe) at the School of Industrial Arts in Bratislava in 1938, where he took classes with Slovak film's notable director Karel Plicka until the department was closed in 1939.

With the application of anti-Jewish laws, Kádár was detained in a labor camp. He later said that it was for the first time in his life that he acted as a Jew: He refused conversion and served in a work unit with a yellow armband rather than a white one which was the privilege of those baptized. Kadar's parents and sister were murdered in the death camp at Auschwitz concentration camp.

== Film director ==
=== Overview ===
Kadár began his directing career in Bratislava, Slovakia after World War II with the documentary Life Is Rising from the Ruins (Na troskách vyrastá život, 1945). After several documentaries expressing the views of the Communist Party, which he joined, Kadár moved to Prague in 1947 and returned to Bratislava temporarily in order to make Kathy (Katka, 1950), his first feature film.

Beginning in 1952, he co-directed all his Czechoslovak films with Elmar Klos solely in Prague except their Czech−Slovak projects Death Is Called Engelchen (Slovak: Smrť sa volá Engelchen, Czech: Smrt si říká Engelchen, 1963), The Shop on Main Street (Obchod na korze, 1965), and Adrift (Czech: Touha zvaná Anada, Slovak: Túžba zvaná Anada, Hungarian: Valamit visz a víz, 1969) shot with Slovak, Hungarian, and Czech actors on location at Rusovce, Slovakia. Kadár returned to finish the latter one from the United States, where he immigrated in November 1968.

It was his last work with Klos. He then resumed his career in the U.S. and Canada working in both films and television. He was also a popular professor of film directing at the American Film Institute's Center for Advanced Film Studies.

=== 1950s ===
While touting the obligatory Marxist-Leninist doctrine and adhering to Socialist-Realist filmmaking, Ján Kadár and Elmar Klos first bounced between comedy and hard-core propaganda. Kadár's first feature film, Kathy (Katka) was released in 1950.

Their choice of themes began to change with the first, mild relaxation of communism in Czechoslovakia after Soviet leader Khrushchev's secret speech in 1956. Kadár and Klos's first film during this minor thaw, Three Wishes (Tři přání, 1958), a cagey satire on aspects of everyday life, outraged the authorities and was shelved until the more relaxed conditions in 1963.

The studios suspended both directors for two years.

Their Communist Party membership protected them from a worse fate, however, and Kadár was able to find a refuge in semi-propagandist, technically avant-garde work for the early Czechoslovak multi-screen shows at the Laterna magika (Magic Lantern) project.

=== 1960s ===
The first feature film Ján Kadár and Elmar Klos were able to make in five years showed a decided return to classical black-and-white film-making with barely a trace of Kadár's more experimental work at the Laterna magika.

A gradual relaxation of communist control in Czechoslovakia, whose first signs came from Slovakia, enabled the Bratislava journalist and writer Ladislav Mňačko to publish his novel Death Is Called Engelchen (Smrť sa volá Engelchen, 1959) and Kadár and Klos to reach for it from Prague after their suspension was over. The novel and their film Death is Called Engelchen (Slovak: Smrť sa volá Engelchen, Czech: Smrt si říká Engelchen, 1963) spotlighted a new take on the massive pro-democratic Slovak revolt of 1944 that previously had been portrayed only as invariably glorious. It showed some of its aspects that brought about human tragedy.

The film was entered into the 3rd Moscow International Film Festival where it won a Golden Prize.

The directors' next film, Accused aka Defendant (Obžalovaný, 1964), rehashed the propagandist structures of the earlier Socialist-Realist filmmaking.

All of these experiences and influences intersected to bring Kadár and Klos their enduring success with The Shop on Main Street (Obchod na korze, 1965), a compassionate and tormenting depiction of the dead-end street faced by many in Central Europe during the deportations of the Jews to German concentration camps during World War II. The film received several awards, including a foreign-language Oscar. Slovak and Czech film academics and critics still consider it the best film in the history of Slovak cinema.

Kadár and Klos's work on their next project based on the Hungarian novel Something Is Drifting on the Water (Valamit visz a víz, 1928) by Lajos Zilahy, and, effectively, a remake of the Hungarian film with the English international title Something Is in the Water (Valamit visz a víz, dir. Gusztáv Oláh and Lajos Zilahy, 1943) was interrupted by the Soviet-led invasion of Czechoslovakia in August 1968.

Kadár and his family quickly resettled in the United States, returning briefly to help finish Adrift (Czech: Touha zvaná Anada, Slovak: Túžba zvaná Anada, 1969).

=== 1970s ===
Ján Kadár's first film after immigration to the United States and his first solo feature film since 1950 was The Angel Levine (1970), a substantially modified version of Bernard Malamud's short story Angel Levine (1958).

He later directed Lies My Father Told Me (1975) in Canada. He also directed The Other Side of Hell (1978), starring Alan Arkin and Roger E. Mosley, for television.

== Filmography ==
- Life Is Rising from the Ruins (Na troskách vyrastá život, 1945)
- They Are Personally Responsible for Crimes against Humanity (Sú osobne zodpovední za zločiny proti ľudskosti, 1946)
- They Are Personally Responsible for a Betrayal of the National Uprising (Sú osobne zodpovední za zradu na národnom povstaní, 1946)
- Katka (1950)
- The Hijacking; aka Kidnapped (Únos, 1952)
- Music from Mars (Hudba z Marsu, 1954)
- House at the Terminus (Tam na konečné, 1957)
- Three Wishes (Tři přání, 1958)
- Death Is Called Engelchen (Czech: Smrt si říká Engelchen, Slovak: Smrť sa volá Engelchen, 1963)
- Accused (Obžalovaný, also known as Defendant, 1964)
- The Shop on Main Street (Obchod na korze, 1965)
- Adrift (Czech: Touha zvaná Anada, Slovak: Túžba zvaná Anada, Hungarian: Valamit visz a víz, 1969)
- The Angel Levine (1970)
- Lies My Father Told Me (1976)
- The Case against Milligan (1976)
- The Other Side of Hell (1978)
- Freedom Road (1979)
