= Sokolovo (film) =

1974 Soviet–Czechoslovak war film

- Russian film poster
- Directed by: Otakar Vávra
- Written by: Otakar Vávra; Miloslav Fábera; Nikolai Figurovsky
- Starring: Ladislav Chudík; Yury Solomin; Martin Štěpánek; Lev Ivanov; Jiří Pleskot; Hannjo Hasse; Vladimír Ráž
- Cinematography: Andrej Barla
- Edited by: Antonín Zelenka
- Music by: Zdeněk Liška
- Production company: Mosfilm
- Release date: 1974
- Running time: 128 minutes
- Countries: Czechoslovakia; USSR
- Languages: Czech, Russian
- Budget: 28 Million KČs

Sokolovo (Russian title Соколово) is a 1974 Soviet–Czechoslovak war film made by Otakar Vávra depicting the Battle of Sokolovo in 1943. The film was published in two parts and was meant as the middle part of Vávra's "war trilogy" consisting of movies Days of Betrayal, Sokolovo and Liberation of Prague.

== Plot ==
The film tells the story of Soviet aircraft designers and test pilots who, after the end of World War II, dedicate themselves to mastering MiG jet fighters, often risking their lives in the process. The plot focuses on three main characters—Viktor (Igor Yasulovich), Yevgeny (Sergey Nikonenko), and Alexei (Gennady Saifullin)—as they return from the war in the Far East and begin working on the development of a new jet aircraft. Viktor and Yevgeny take positions at an aviation factory as a designer and an engineer, respectively, while Alexei becomes a test pilot for the new technology.

The film also explores the personal challenges faced by the protagonists. Viktor's wife (Elena Sanaeva) leaves him for a wounded man she nursed in a hospital. Alexei's actions lead to the destruction of his own family. Only Yevgeny manages to maintain a stable and happy family life amidst the professional and personal turmoil.

== Cast ==
- Ladislav Chudík as Ludvík Svoboda
- Vladimir Samoilov as generálporučík
- Yury Solomin as general Shafarenko
- Bohumil Pastorek as Klement Gottwald
- Martin Štěpánek as npor. Otakar Jaroš
- Lev Ivanov as náměstek lidového komisaře
- Jiří Pleskot as Eduard Beneš
- Hanjo Hasse as Reinhard Heydrich
- Vladimír Ráž as Sergěj Ingr
- Josef Langmiler as Zdeněk Fierlinger
- Ladislav Hádl as Kopecký
- Ivan Ryzhov as pplk. Bilyutin
- Štefan Kvietik as Špígl
- Pavel Pípal as Opatrný
- Jiří Krampol as Karel Horák
- Jan Kanyza as Rataj
- Rudolf Jelínek as ppor.Antonín Sochor
- Ladislav Lakomý as Rediš
- Emil Horváth as Daniš
- Renáta Doleželová as Anka Kadlecová
- Yuriy Nazarov as npor. Filatov
- Vladimír Protasenko as por. Šironin
