= The Drama Club =

Theatre in Prague, Czechia

- Činoherní klub

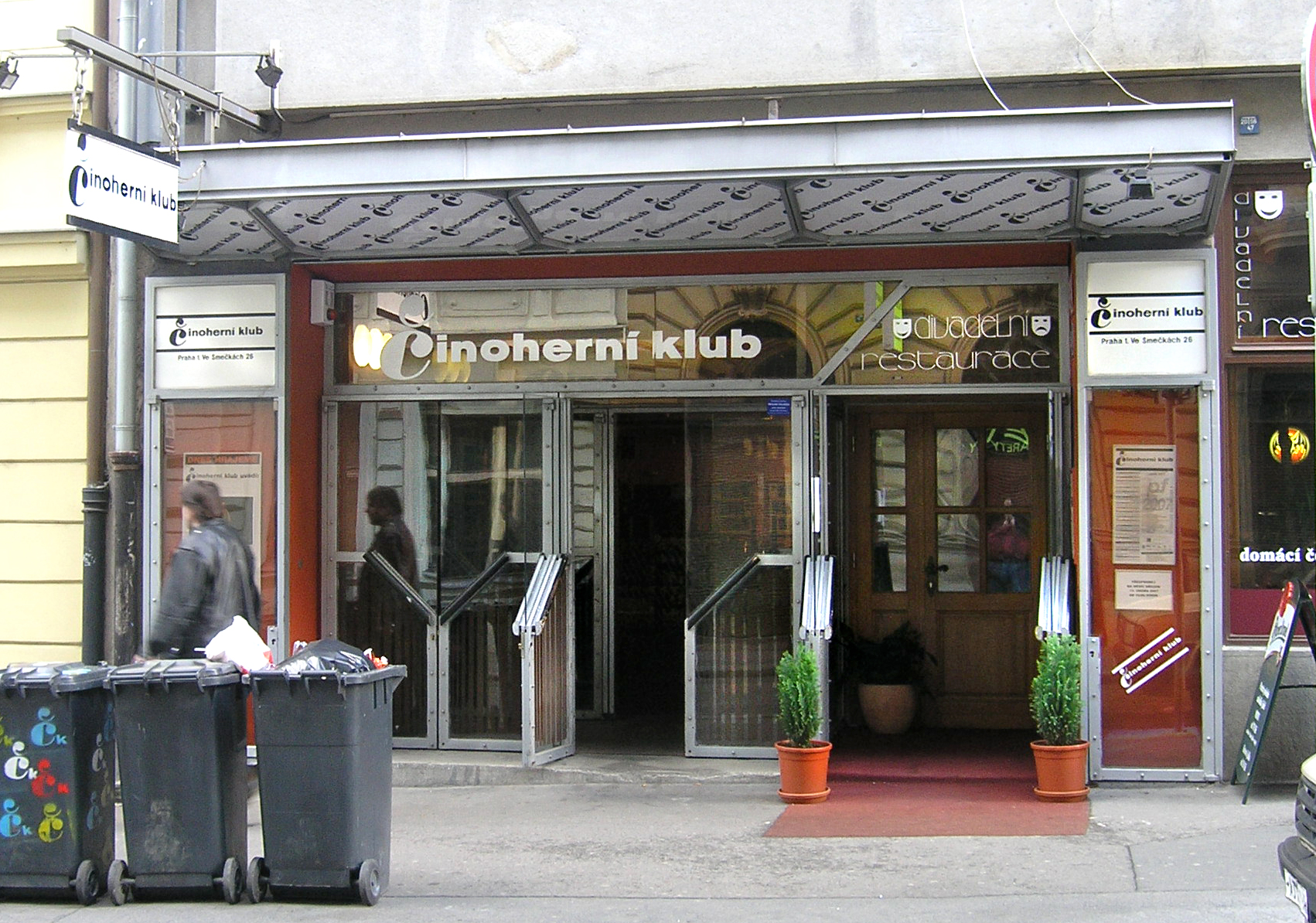
- Entrance into the theatre in Prague's street Ve Smečkách
- Interactive map of The Drama Club
- Address: Ve Smečkách 26; Prague; Czech Republic
- Coordinates: 50.079342°N 14.427372°E

Construction
- Opened: 1965

Website
- Official website

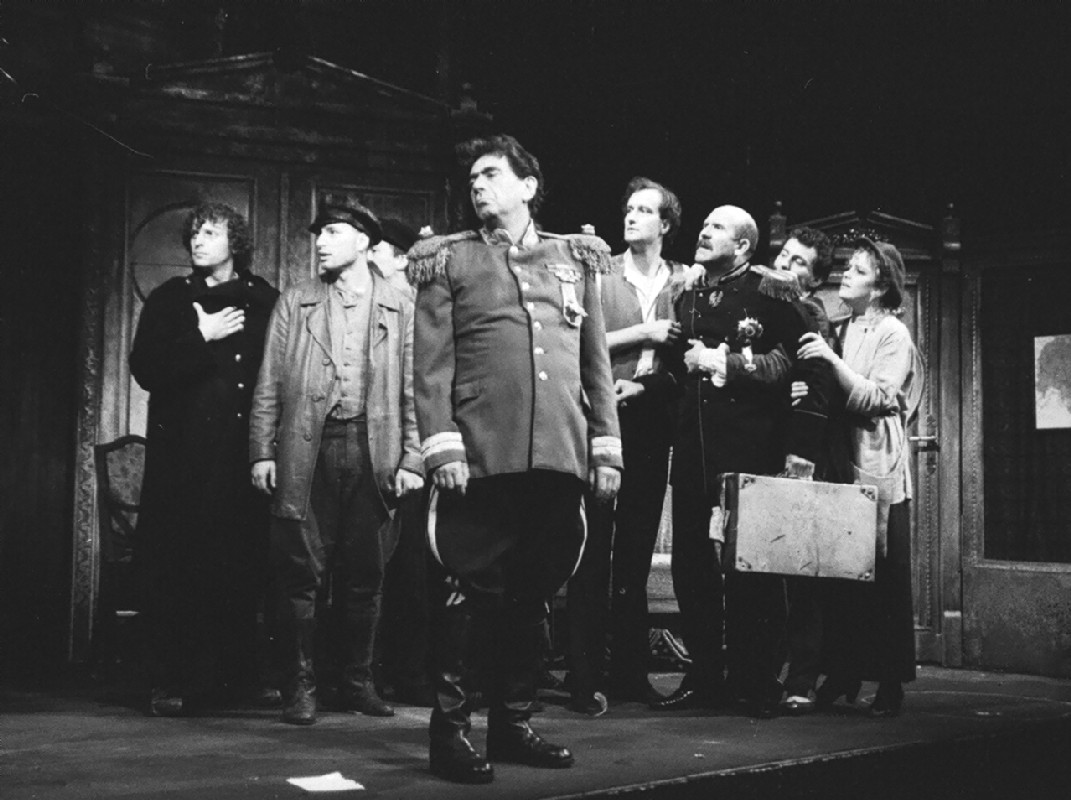
Leo Birinski ´s Mumraj (Dance of Fools) in The Drama Club, 1991.

The Drama Club (Czech: Činoherní klub) is a theatre located in Prague.

The Drama Club was founded by Ladislav Smoček and Jaroslav Vostrý. The opening performance of Piknik took place on 3 March 1965. The actors in the 1970s and 1980s included Petr Čepek, Pavel Landovský, Josef Somr, Jiří Kodet, Jirina Trebicka, Libuše Šafránková and Josef Abrhám. On 19 November 1989, two days after the Velvet revolution, the Civic Forum was founded there. The Drama Club was awarded Alfréd Radok Award in category Theatre of the Year in 2002, and 2008. The current actors include Jaromír Dulava, Ivana Chýlková, Ondřej Vetchý and Petr Nárožný. Founder Jaroslav Vostry died on 18 March 2025.

== Selected performances ==
- 2008 – Ptákovina (The Blunder) by Milan Kundera, directed by Ladislav Smoček
- 2006 – American Buffalo by David Mamet, d. Ondřej Sokol
- 2005 – The Pillowman by Martin McDonagh, d. Ondřej Sokol
- 2004 – The Goat, or Who Is Sylvia? by Edward Albee, d. Martin Čičvák, co-production with Slovak Arena Theatre
- 2004 – Sexual Perversity in Chicago by David Mamet, d. Ondřej Sokol
- 2002 – The Lonesome West by Martin McDonagh, d. Ondřej Sokol
- 2000 – Return to the Desert by Bernard-Marie Koltès, d. Roman Polák
- 1992 – The Miser by Molière, d. Vladimír Strnisko
- 1991 – Mumraj (The Dance of Fools) by Leo Birinski, d. Ladislav Smoček
- 1989 – I Served the King of England by Bohumil Hrabal, d. Ivo Krobot
- 1986 – Noises Off by Michael Frayn, d. Jiří Menzel
- 1982 – The Gamblers by Nikolai Gogol, d. Ladislav Smoček
- 1981 – Něžný barbar by Bohumil Hrabal, d. Ivo Krobot
- 1981 – Geschichten aus dem Wienerwald by Ödön von Horváth, d. Ladislav Smoček
- 1978 – Tři v tom by Jaroslav Vostrý, d. Jiří Menzel
- 1970 – Hurá na Bastilu by Jan Vodňanský and Petr Skoumal, d. Petr Skoumal
- 1969 – Hodinový hoteliér by Pavel Landovský, d. Evald Schorm
- 1967 – The Birthday Party by Harold Pinter, d. Jaroslav Vostrý
- 1967 – The Government Inspector by Nikolai Gogol, d. Jan Kačer
- 1966 – Crime and Punishment by Fyodor Dostoyevsky, d. Evald Schorm
- 1966 – Dr. Burke's Strange Afternoon , written and directed by Ladislav Smoček
- 1965 – Piknik, written and directed by Ladislav Smoček
