= Píča =

Czech and Slovak profanity

Drawing of the symbol píča

Píča (Czech pronunciation: [piːt͡ʃa]), sometimes short piča or pyča [pit͡ʃa]/[pɪt͡ʃa], is a Czech and Slovak profanity that refers to the vagina similar to the English word cunt. It is often represented as a symbol of a spearhead, a rhombus standing on one of its sharper points with a vertical line in the middle, representing a vulva.

The meaning is clear for Czechs, Slovaks and Hungarians. In some other languages it has other spellings (e.g. in the non-Slavic Hungarian language it is written as "picsa"), but has similar pronunciation and carries the same meaning and profanity. Drawing this symbol is considered a taboo, or at least unaccepted by mainstream society.

The word píča is of a feminine gender, in order to insult also men Czechs derived its masculine form píčus.

== Symbol in culture ==
This symbol has occurred in a few Czech movies, including Bylo nás pět. In the 1969 drama The Blunder (Ptákovina), Milan Kundera describes the havoc, both public and private, that ensues after the headmaster of a school draws the symbol on a blackboard. In Jára Cimrman's play Akt ("The Nude") one of the characters, sexologist Jan Turnovský, is caught drawing rhombi in his notepad.

Jaromír Nohavica confessed, in the 1983-song Halelujá, to "drawing short lines and rhombi on a plaster" (in Czech: tužkou kreslil na omítku čárečky a kosočtverce). František Ringo Čech named one of his provoking pictures The animals are admiring píča (in Czech: Zvířátka obdivují píču). The Czech punk band Tři sestry (Three Sisters) uses a variant of the píča symbol with three vertical lines, similar to the IEC 60417 Class III symbol, as its logo.

== Píča in Ostrava region ==
In Moravian-Silesian Region, especially in Ostrava, the word is used strictly in its short form pyča, mostly as a filler. The fans of football club FC Baník Ostrava very often chant "Banik pyčo, Banik pyčo, FCB!". Pyča is used in plenty of meanings, there is even a joke ridiculing Ostrava inhabitants; according to this joke the people there have a lack of vocabulary so if a man says "Pyča v pyči, pyčo!", he means "I broke up with my wife, my friend!".

== See also ==
- Lozenge, a similar symbol
- Vesica piscis
