= The Return of the Prodigal Son (1966 film) =

1966 film

- Directed by: Evald Schorm
- Written by: Evald Schorm; Sergej Machonin
- Produced by: Václav Rouha
- Starring: Jan Kačer; Jana Brejchová
- Cinematography: František Uldrich
- Edited by: Jiřina Lukešová
- Music by: Jan Klusák
- Production company: Filmové studio Barrandov
- Distributed by: Ústřední půjčovna filmů
- Release date: March 10, 1967
- Running time: 99 minutes
- Country: Czechoslovakia
- Language: Czech

The Return of the Prodigal Son (Czech: Návrat ztraceného syna) is a 1966 Czechoslovak drama film directed by Evald Schorm. The film won Special Mention at Locarno International Film Festival in 1967.

== Cast ==
- Jan Kačer as Jan Šebek
- Jana Brejchová as Jana Šebková
- Jiří Menzel as Jiří
- Milan Morávek as Doctor
- Dana Medřická as Olga
- Anna Lebedová as Jana's mother
- Antonín Lebeda as Jana's father
- Jiřina Třebická as Nurse
- Jiří Kylián as Dancer Zdeněk
- Nina Divíšková as Young patient

== Release ==
in 2012, the film was released on DVD by The Criterion Collection as a part of the Eclipse Series compilation Pearls of the Czech New Wave.
