= Martin Štěpánek (actor) =

Czech actor, journalist, and politician

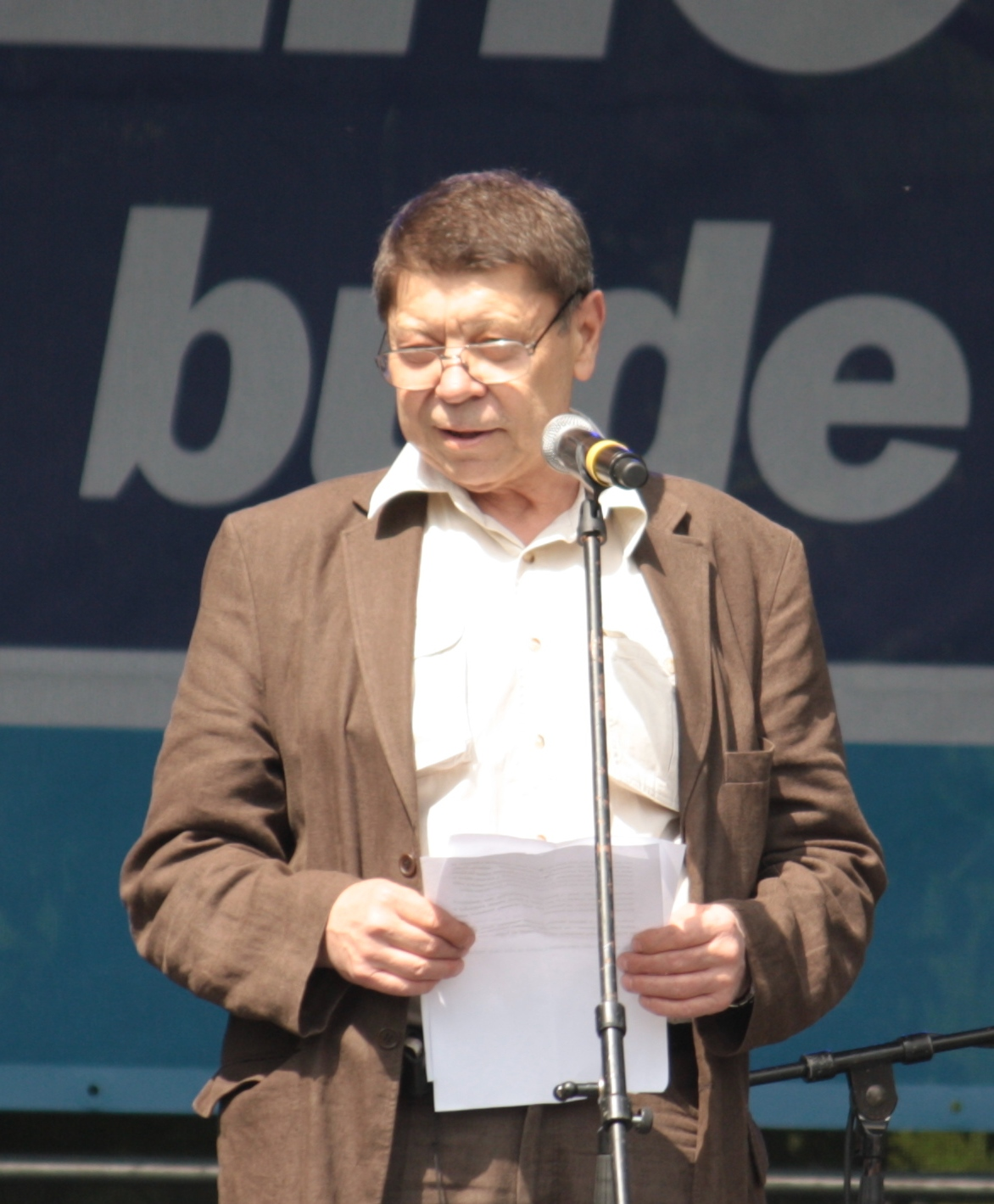

Minister of Culture
- In office 4 September 2006 – 9 January 2007
- Prime Minister: Mirek Topolánek
- Preceded by: Vítězslav Jandák
- Succeeded by: Helena Třeštíková

Personal details
- Born: 11 January 1947 Prague, Czechoslovakia
- Died: 16 September 2010 (aged 63) Prague, Czech Republic
- Party: Independent for the Civic Democratic Party
- Parent: Zdeněk Štěpánek (father)

Martin Štěpánek (11 January 1947 – 16 September 2010) was a Czech actor, journalist and politician. He joined Mirek Topolánek's First Cabinet as Culture Minister in September 2006, serving in the position until January 2007. He was the son of actor Zdeněk Štěpánek. In 1981 he emigrated to Austria. In 1983 he moved to Munich, where he spent a significant part of his career working for Radio Free Europe. In Munich he joined Czech language exile Masonic Lodge U tří hvězd, which moved to Czechoslovakia in 1990, today part of the Grand Lodge of the Czech Republic. Štěpánek died in Prague in September 2010 due to suicide.

== Filmography ==
Year	Title	Role	Notes
1964	Accused	Kudrna syn	
1966	Alibi na vode	kajakár Karel Ostrý	
1966	Serif za mrezami	Karol	
1967	Zenu ani kvetinou neuhodís	Dásin mladík	
1968	Objízdka	Olda	
1969	Flirt se slecnou Stribrnou	Hartman	
1970	Svatá hrísnice	Ferdys Pistora	
1971	Four Murders Are Enough, Darling	Gangster	
1971	Pet muzu a jedno srdce	Zdenek	
1972	Tajemství velikeho vypravece	Alexandre Dumas	
1972	Vlak do stanice Nebe	Lékar-partyzan	
1973	Days of Betrayal	Sergeant Václav Rataj	
1973	Dream City	von Brendel	
1975	Sokolovo	Npor. Jaros	
1978	Proč nevěřit na zázraky	Hospodár	
1980	Rukojmí v Bella Vista	Bocman Janda	
1981	Ten svetr si nesvlíkej		
1997	Pasáz	Main Door-Keeper	
2001	Královský slib	Vyslanec princezny	
2009	Jménem krále	Markvart z Vartemberka	
