= Courage for Every Day =

1964 film

- Directed by: Evald Schorm
- Screenplay by: Antonín Máša
- Story by: Antonín Máša
- Starring: Jana Brejchová; Jan Kačer
- Cinematography: Jan Čuřík
- Edited by: Filmové studio Barrandov
- Music by: Jan Klusák
- Production company: Filmové studio Barrandov
- Distributed by: Státní fond kinematografie
- Release date: 15 January 1965
- Running time: 85 minutes
- Country: Czechoslovakia
- Language: Czech

Courage for Every Day (Czech: Každý den odvahu) is a 1964 Czechoslovak drama film directed by Evald Schorm.

== Plot ==
Director Evald Schorm reflects on the changing political tides of his generation in this clear-eyed study of idealism and disillusionment. Jarda (Jan Kačer) is a passionate Communist worker fervently dedicated to the principles of his party. But as those around him grow increasingly disenchanted with the cause, he must confront a sobering realization: that everything he has fought for has been for nothing.

== Cast ==
- Jana Brejchová as Věra
- Jan Kačer as Jarda Lukáš
- Josef Abrhám as Bořek
- Vlastimil Brodský as Journalist
- Jiřina Jirásková as Olina, journalist's wife
- Olga Scheinpflugová as Landlady
- Václav Trégl as Eduard Mrázek
- Jan Libíček as Photographer
- Jan Cmíral as Company director
- Josef Krameš as Magician
- Helena Uhlířová as Magician's assistant
- Jiří Menzel as Jarda's colleague

== Reception ==
=== Awards ===
1966 Locarno International Film Festival

- Won: Golden Leopard
