= Evald Schorm =

Czech theatre director (1931–1988)

- Born: 15 December 1931; Prague, Czechoslovakia
- Died: 14 December 1988 (aged 56); Prague, Czechoslovakia
- Occupations: Film director, screenwriter, actor
- Years active: 1959–1988

Evald Schorm (15 December 1931 – 14 December 1988) was a Czech film and stage director, screenwriter and actor. He directed 26 films between 1959 and 1988. Schorm was a notable exponent of the Czech Film New Wave.

== Biography ==
Schorm was born into a farmer family, and spent his childhood at the family farm in Elbančice near Mladá Vožice. After communists confiscated the family property, he was expelled from school and moved to Zličín near Prague, together with his parents. Schorm had to become a construction worker, but in 1956 he was finally accepted at the Film and TV School of the Academy of Performing Arts in Prague. He graduated in Film direction in 1963, together with other future members of the Czech New Wave. He began his career at the Studio dokumentárního filmu (Studio of the Documentary Film) together with cameraman Jan Špáta. Together they created many short films and documentaries of strong humanistic and emotional content, in close and long-lasting collaboration.

In 1964, Schorm directed his first full-length film, Courage for Every Day which dealt with the disillusionment of individuals victimized in the name of false ideals. He explored the ethical principles of human behavior in films such as the psychological drama The Return of the Prodigal Son (1966). He also acted minor roles in films made by his friends.

During the 1970s and 1980s he was regarded as too "politically undesirable" to be involved in Czech filmmaking, and therefore only worked as a stage director. He was involved with many Prague theatres, such as Činoherní klub, Studio Ypsilon, Theatre on the Balustrade, Semafor, Laterna Magika, and the National Theatre as well as with theatres in Brno, Olomouc, Cheb and Gottwaldov. Schorm was also a notable opera director, and directed opera performances in Prague (Fidelio in Smetana Theatre), and at the Janáček Opera House Brno for posthumous premiere in 1971 of Martinů's film opera Les trois souhaits, Geneva and Stuttgart. From 1982 he was engaged by the Prague theatre Laterna Magika.

From 1964 to 1970 he taught at the Film and Television School of The Academy of Performing Arts in Prague. In 1988, shortly before his death, he created his last film Vlastně se nic nestalo. In 1992, he was posthumously awarded the Order of Tomáš Garrigue Masaryk.

== Filmography ==
=== Fiction film ===
- The Tourist (1961) - short film
- Railwaymen (1963) - short film
- Courage for Every Day (1964)
- Pearls of the Deep (1965) - Segment House of Joy, based on Bohumil Hrabal's work
- The Return of the Prodigal Son (1966)
- Left with Five Girls (1967)
- End of a Priest (1969)
- The Seventh Day, the Eighth Night (1969)
- Dogs and People (1971)
- Nothing Really Happened (1988)

=== Documentary ===
- Blok 15 (1959) - a documentary on construction workers at the Orlík Dam
- Kostelník (1961)
- Jan Konstantin, zasloužilý umělec (1961) - on the National Theatre singer Jan Konstantin
- Země zemi (1962)
- Stromy a lidé (1962)
- Žít svůj život (1963) - a short film about the Czech photographer Josef Sudek.
- Proč? (1964)
- Reflection (1965)
- Odkaz (1965)
- Žalm (1966) - a montage of stills from the Old New Synagogue in Prague, to commemorate the tragic destiny of the Jewish people.
- Carmen nejen podle Bizeta (1968)
- Etuda o zkoušce (1976)

=== Television ===
- Král a žena (1967)
- Rozhovory (1969)
- Lítost (1970)
- Úklady a láska (1971)
- Lepší pán (1971)
- Král jelenem (1977)
- The Brothers Karamazov (1981)

=== Actor ===
- Hotel for Strangers (1967)
- A Report on the Party and the Guests (1966)
- The Joke - based on the novel by Milan Kundera, directed by Jaromil Jireš (1968)
- Útěky domů (1980)
- Krajina s nábytkem (1986)

== Theatre direction ==
Činoherní klub Theatre:

- Zločin a trest (Crime and Punishment)
- Hodinový hoteliér

Laterna Magika Theatre:

- Láska v barvách karnevalu
- Kouzelný cirkus (A Magic Circus) - Schorm was also author of the script
- Sněhová královna (The Snow Queen) - Schorm was also author of the script
- Noční zkouška -
- Černý mnich -
- Oddyseus (Ulysses) - Schorm was also author of the script

Ypsilon Theatre in Liberec

- Comedy, Satire, Irony and Deeper Meaning
- The Eternal Husband
- Thirteen Scents
- The Twelve Chairs

Malo kazalište Trešnja in Zagreb (1982)

- Braća Karamazovi (The Brothers Karamazov) - Schorm was also author of the dramatization
