= Lozenge (shape) =

Quadrilateral with sides of equal length

◊o

Lozenge
- In Unicode: U+25CA ◊ LOZENGE (&loz;, &lozenge;)

Related
- See also: U+2311 ⌑ SQUARE LOZENGE; U+29EB ⧫ BLACK LOZENGE; U+25C8 ◈ WHITE DIAMOND CONTAINING BLACK SMALL DIAMOND

A lozenge (/ˈlɒzɪndʒ/ LOZ-inj; symbol: ◊), often referred to as a diamond, is a form of rhombus. The definition of lozenge is not strictly fixed, and the word is sometimes used simply as a synonym (from Old French losenge) for rhombus. Most often, though, lozenge refers specifically to a thin rhombus, especially one with two acute angles of 45° and two obtuse angles of 135°.

The lozenge shape is often used in parquetry (with acute angles that are 360°/n with n being an integer higher than 4, because they can be used to form a set of tiles of the same shape and size, reusable to cover the plane in various geometric patterns as the result of a tiling process called tessellation in mathematics) and as decoration on ceramics, silverware and textiles. It also features in heraldry and playing cards.

== Symbolism ==
The lozenge motif dates from the Neolithic and Paleolithic period in Eastern Europe and represents a sown field and female fertility. The ancient lozenge pattern often shows up in Diamond vault architecture, in traditional dress patterns of Slavic peoples, and in traditional Ukrainian embroidery. The lozenge pattern also appears extensively in Celtic art, art from the Ottoman Empire, and ancient Phrygian art.

The lozenge symbolism is one of the main symbols for women in Berber carpets. Common Berber jewelry from the Aurès Mountains or Kabylie in Algeria also uses this pattern as a female fertility sign.

In 1658, the English philosopher Sir Thomas Browne published The Garden of Cyrus, subtitled The Quincunciall Lozenge, or Network Plantations of the Ancients, in which he outlined the mystical interconnection of art, nature and the universe via the quincunx pattern. He also suggested therein that ancient plantations were laid out in a lozenge pattern.

Lozenges appear as symbols in ancient classic element systems, in amulets, and in religious symbolism. In playing cards, the symbol for the suit of diamonds is a lozenge.

== Applications ==
=== Calculator ===
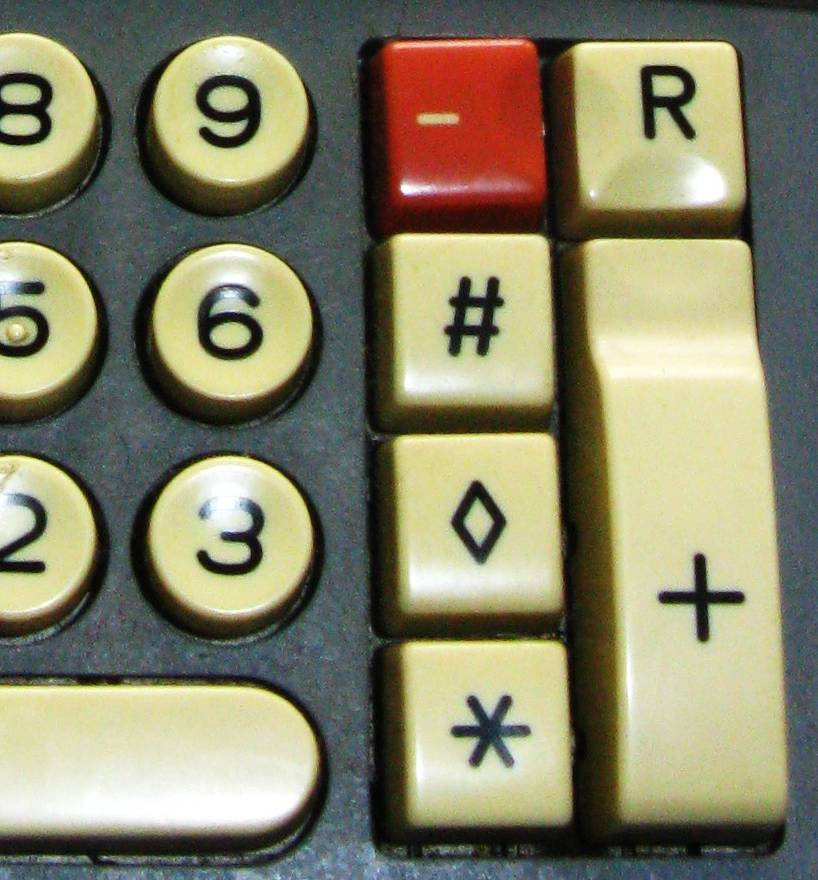
Lozenge (subtotal) key on a Walther Multa 32 calculator keyboard, c. 1970

On equipment, especially calculators, the lozenge is used to mark the subtotal key. It is standardized in ISO 7000 as symbol ISO-7000-0650 ("Subtotal"). In a similar fashion, the square lozenge (⌑), part of the BCDIC character set, was often used on tabulation listings to indicate second level totals in banking installations in the 1960s.

=== Computing ===
The APL programming language uses the lozenge, called diamond, as statement separator.

=== Camouflage ===
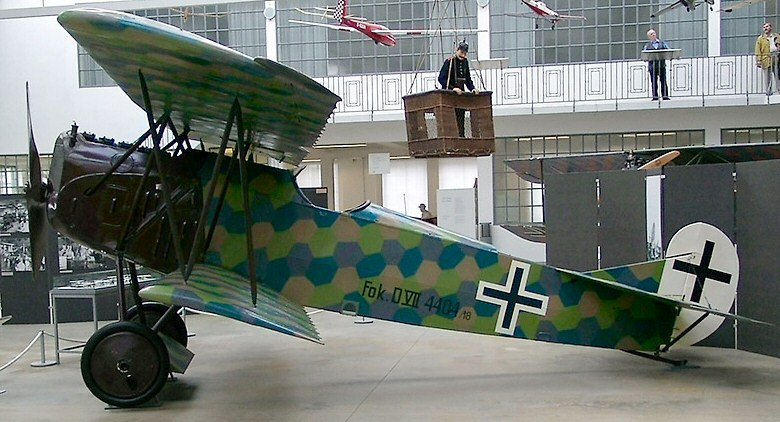
A Fokker D.VII shows a four-color lozenge camouflage

During the First World War, the Germans developed lozenge camouflage (German: Lozenge-Tarnung). This camouflage was made up of colored polygons of four or five colors. The repeating patterns often used irregular four-, five- and six-sided polygons, but some contained regular rhombi or hexagons. Because painting such a pattern was very time-consuming, and the paint added considerably to the weight of the aircraft, the pattern was printed on fabric. This pre-printed fabric was used from 1916 until the end of the war, in various forms and colours.

=== Flags and emblems ===
Flag of Brazil

Several flags feature lozenges, including the flag of Brazil, which contains a yellow lozenge at the center. One official flag of Bavaria is entirely made of blue and white lozenges.

Several emblems feature lozenges, including the Emblem of Uttarakhand, one of the twenty-eight states of India.

=== Heraldry ===
The lozenge in heraldry is a diamond-shaped charge, usually somewhat narrower than it is tall. A mascle is a voided lozenge—that is, a lozenge with a lozenge-shaped hole in the middle—and the rarer rustre is a lozenge containing a circular hole. A field covered in a pattern of lozenges is described as lozengy; a similar field of mascles is masculy.

=== Mathematics ===
In axiomatic set theory, the lozenge refers to the principles known collectively as the diamond principle.

=== Medicine ===
Cough tablets have taken the name lozenge, based on their original shape. According to the Oxford English Dictionary the first use of this sense was in 1530.

In Finland, the lozenge is associated with salmiak, through Apteekin Salmiakki. Thus, the lozenge is commonly called salmiakkikuvio "salmiak shape". The pattern is often used even if the candy is not actually lozenge-shaped.

=== Military insignia ===
==== Finland ====
In the Finnish military, the lozenge symbol is used in the insignia of conscripts undergoing officer training to signify their rank and progress. Conscript Officer Students, who are still in the early stages of their training, wear an insignia with one lozenge. As they advance in their training, they become Conscript Officer Candidates, identified by an insignia with two lozenges. This progression marks their nearing completion of officer training, with the lozenge serving as a clear visual indicator of their status.

==== United States ====
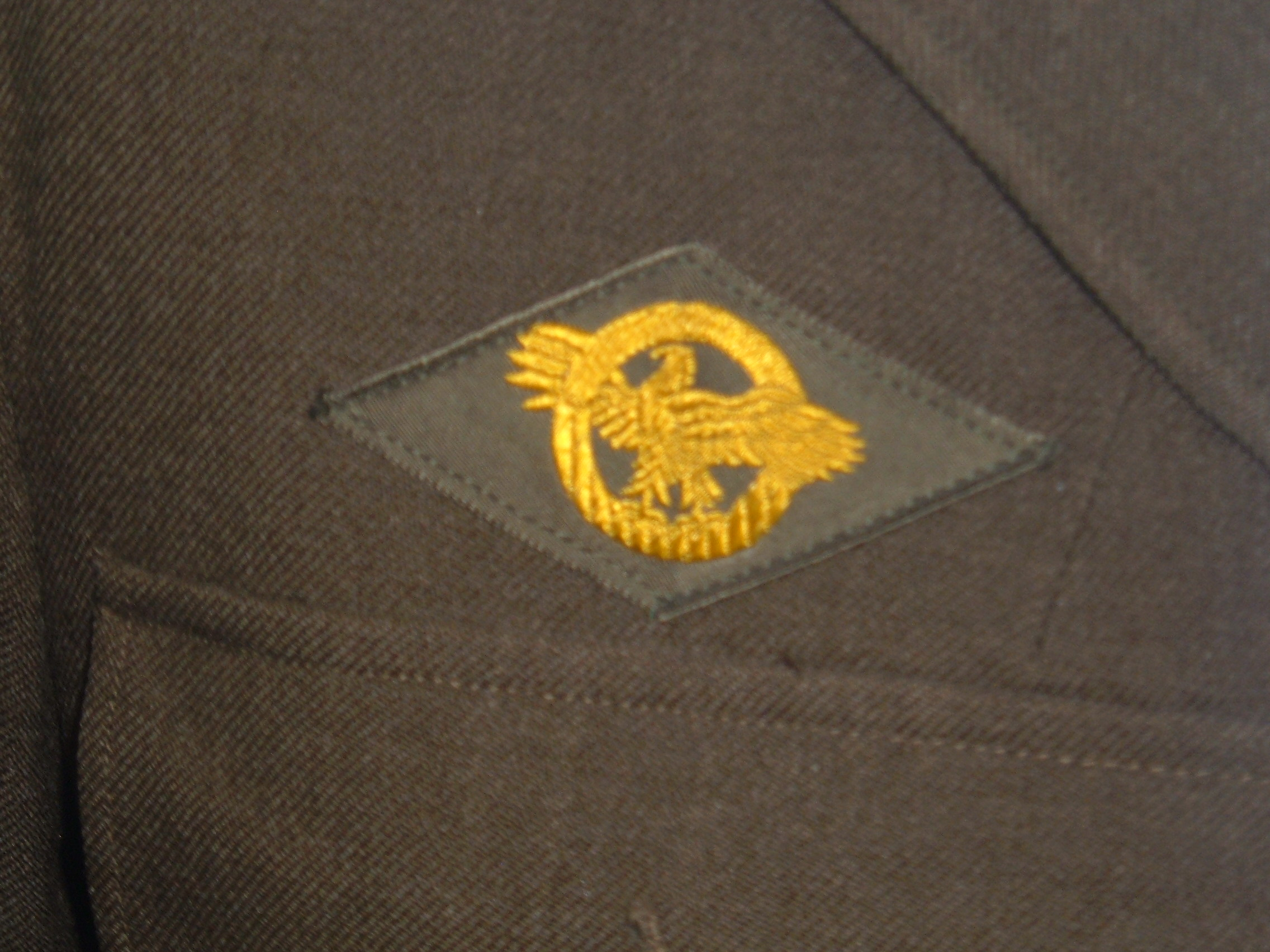
WWII "ruptured duck" Honorable Discharge Emblem lozenge

To implement 10 U.S.C 773, the Secretary of the Navy has prescribed the following distinctive mark for wear by members of military societies which are composed entirely of honorably discharged officers and enlisted personnel, or by the instructors and members of duly organized cadet corps.

"The distinctive mark will be a diamond, 3 1/2 inches long by 2 inches wide, of any cloth material. A white distinctive mark will be worn on blue, green, or khaki clothing; and a blue distinctive mark will be worn on white clothing."

"The distinctive mark will be worn on all outer clothing on the right sleeve, at the point of the shoulder, the upper tip of the diamond to be 1/4 inch below the shoulder seam."

The lozenge is used in the Army, Marine Corps, and Air Force on the insignia of their respective first sergeants. It is also used in the cadet programs of Army ROTC, Army and Marine Corps Junior ROTC, and the Civil Air Patrol as rank insignia of cadet officers corresponding to the military pay grades of O-4 to O-6 (Cadet Major, Cadet Lieutenant Colonel, and Cadet Colonel).

=== Visual arts ===
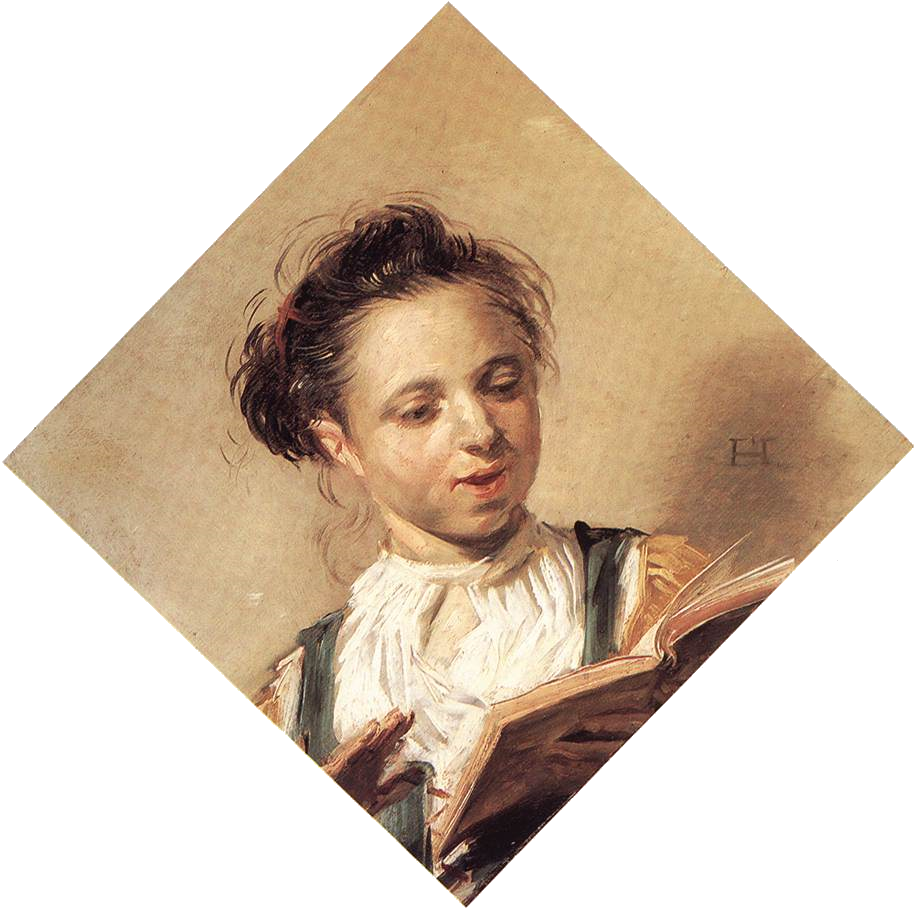
Girl Singing by Frans Hals, from about 1628, is an example of a painting in lozenge format.

Lozenge is the term used to identify the format of a two-dimensional work of art, typically a parallelogrammatic painting on a canvas, panel, or paper support, that hangs as if from one of its corners. An example is Girl Singing by Frans Hals.

=== Modal logic ===
In modal logic, the lozenge expresses that there is "possibility". For example, the expression $\lozenge P$ expresses that it is possible that $P$ is true.

=== Traffic signs ===
Bicycle lane

The lozenge (technically a mascle) can be used on public roadways in the United States and Canada to mark a specific lane for a particular use. The lane will usually be painted with a lozenge at a regular interval, and signage will be installed to indicate the restrictions on using the lane. This marking is most often used to denote high-occupancy vehicle lanes or bus lanes, with accompanying signage reading "◊ HOV LANE" or "◊ BUS LANE" and giving the requirements for a vehicle to be accepted. Prior to 17 January 2006, lozenges could also be used to mark bicycle-only lanes, often in conjunction with a bicycle icon.

Starting in August 2023 on a four-years trial in France, a white lozenge on blue background reserves lanes to car-sharing vehicles (at least one passenger besides the driver).

In Japan and South Korea, a lozenge marked in white paint on the road indicates an upcoming uncontrolled pedestrian crossing. Similarly, in New Zealand a lozenge marked in white paint on the road may be placed to indicate an upcoming pedestrian crossing.

In the United Kingdom, lozenges are used on tramway signs. For instance, speed limits are shown as a black lozenge on a white background, containing the speed limit in kilometres per hour.

This road has priority

In many parts of Europe, traffic from the right has right of way at all junctions, unless otherwise stipulated. A yellow lozenge is used (typically on major routes) to indicate that the rule does not apply to the current route.

A hollow lozenge is also used in the signage of waterways to identify a hazard. A cross is placed in the lozenge, dividing it in four, to mark a restricted area.

== Square lozenge (pillow symbol) ==
A similar shape, the square lozenge (⌑), with concavely curved edges instead of straight lines and oriented such that its edges lie up, down, left and right, has a codepoint in Unicode as U+2311 ⌑ SQUARE LOZENGE. It is used in travel agencies, where it appears on the specialist keyboards used with booking terminals with the familiar name, the pillow symbol. In the 1960s, it was used in banking and for other purposes.

== Encodings ==
In Unicode, the lozenge is encoded in multiple variants:

- U+22C4 ⋄ DIAMOND OPERATOR (&diam;, &Diamond;, &diamond;)
- U+25CA ◊ LOZENGE (&loz;, &lozenge;)
- U+2662 ♢ WHITE DIAMOND SUIT (Note: The term 'white' is perhaps a misnomer, since colour is font choice. A more accurate description might be 'outline'.)
- U+2666 ♦ BLACK DIAMOND SUIT (&diamondsuit;, &diams;) (Note: The term 'black' is perhaps a misnomer, since colour is font choice. A more accurate description might be 'solid'.)
- U+27E0 ⟠ LOZENGE DIVIDED BY HORIZONTAL RULE
- U+27E1 ⟡ WHITE CONCAVE-SIDED DIAMOND
- U+29EB ⧫ BLACK LOZENGE (&blacklozenge;, &lozf;)
- U+2B27 ⬧ BLACK MEDIUM LOZENGE
- U+2B28 ⬨ WHITE MEDIUM LOZENGE
- U+2B2A ⬪ BLACK SMALL LOZENGE
- U+2B2B ⬫ WHITE SMALL LOZENGE
- U+25C6 ◆ BLACK DIAMOND
- U+25C7 ◇ WHITE DIAMOND
- U+2756 ❖ BLACK DIAMOND MINUS WHITE X
- U+20DF ⃟ COMBINING ENCLOSING DIAMOND
- U+1CC8D 𜲍 INVERSE BLACK DIAMOND

The lozenge is present in IBM PC code page 437 (at character code 4) and Mac-Roman (at character 215 = 0xd7). The AMS-LaTeX command for the lozenge is \lozenge ($\lozenge$).

Other related unicode characters include:

- U+2311 ⌑ SQUARE LOZENGE
- U+2726 ✦ BLACK FOUR POINTED STAR
- U+2727 ✧ WHITE FOUR POINTED STAR

In IBM 026 punched card code the pillow-shaped square "lozenge" ⌑ is (12-8-4).

== Imagery ==
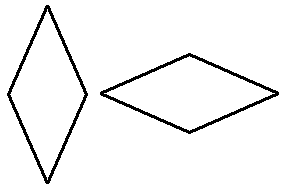
Lozenge

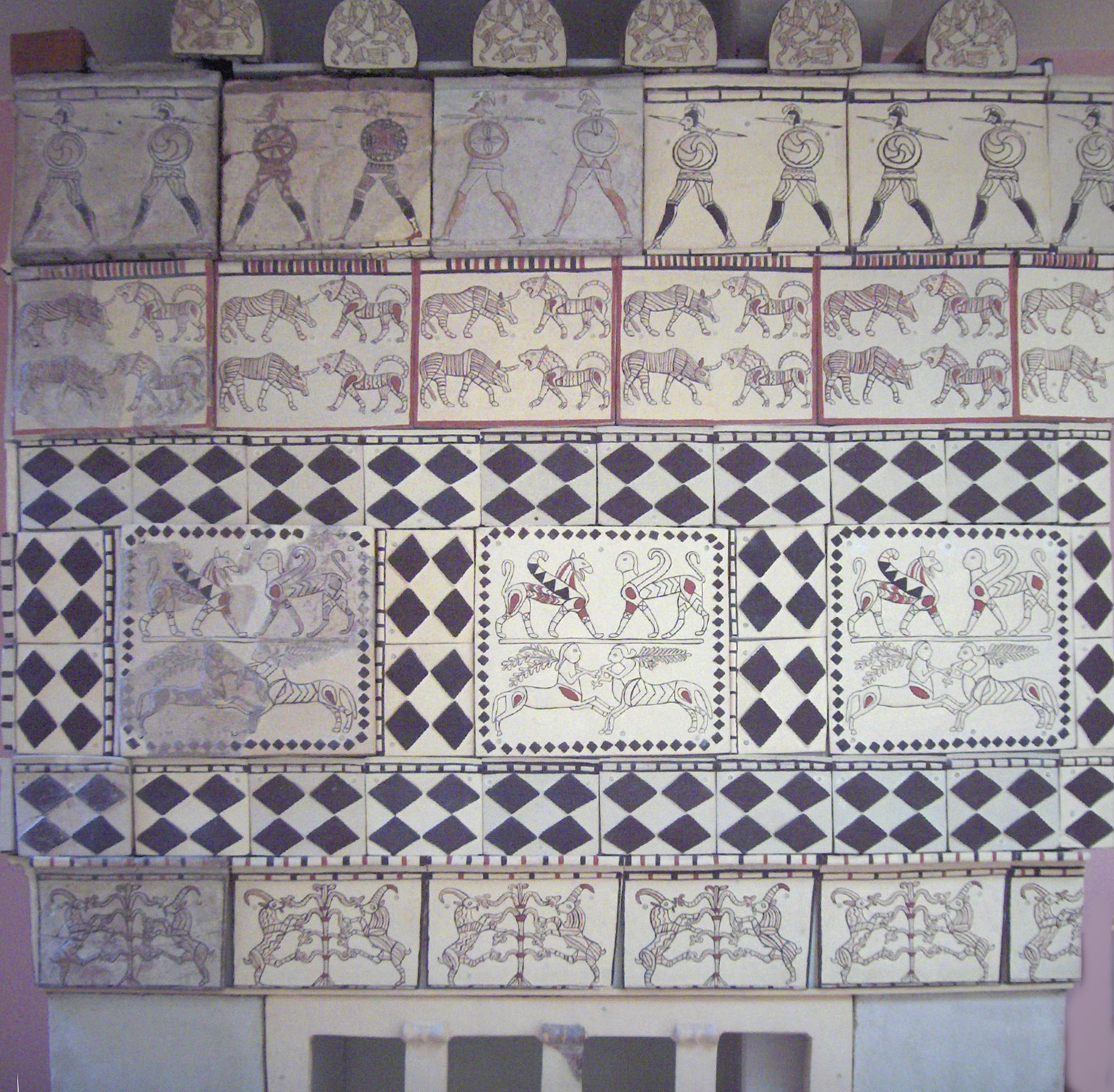
Phrygian art, 7th Century BC

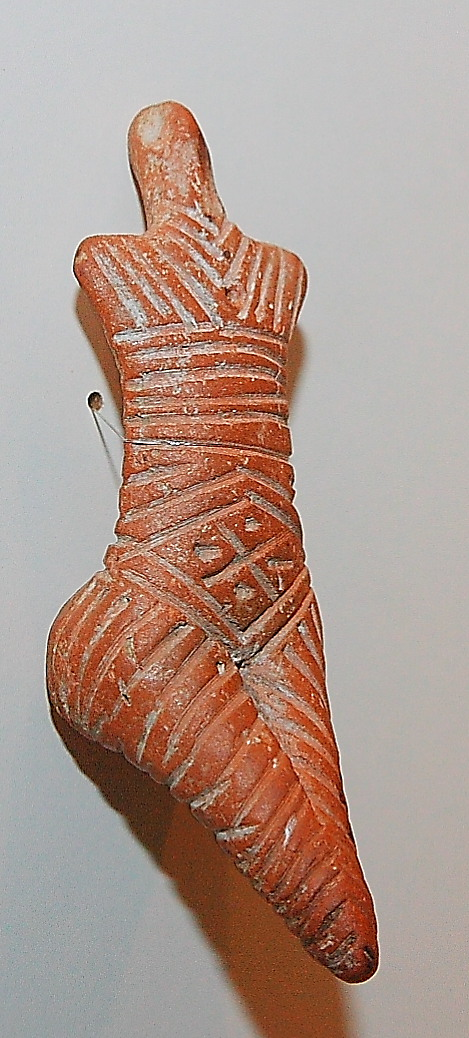
Cucuteni-Trypillian figurine with sown field pattern

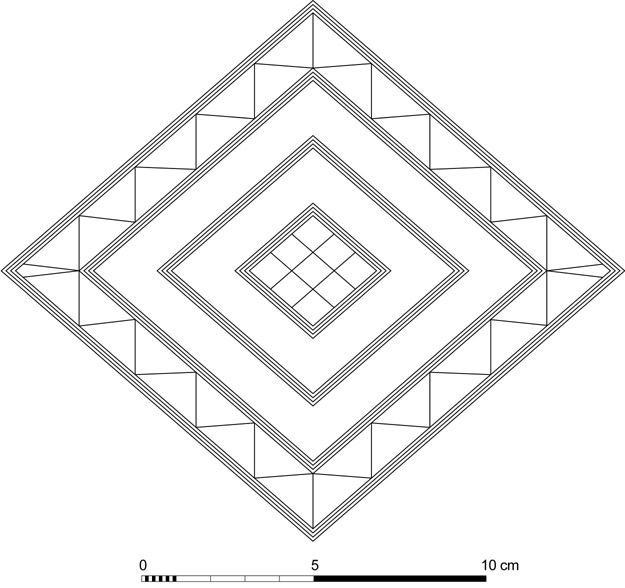
Bush Barrow Lozenge British Bronze Age

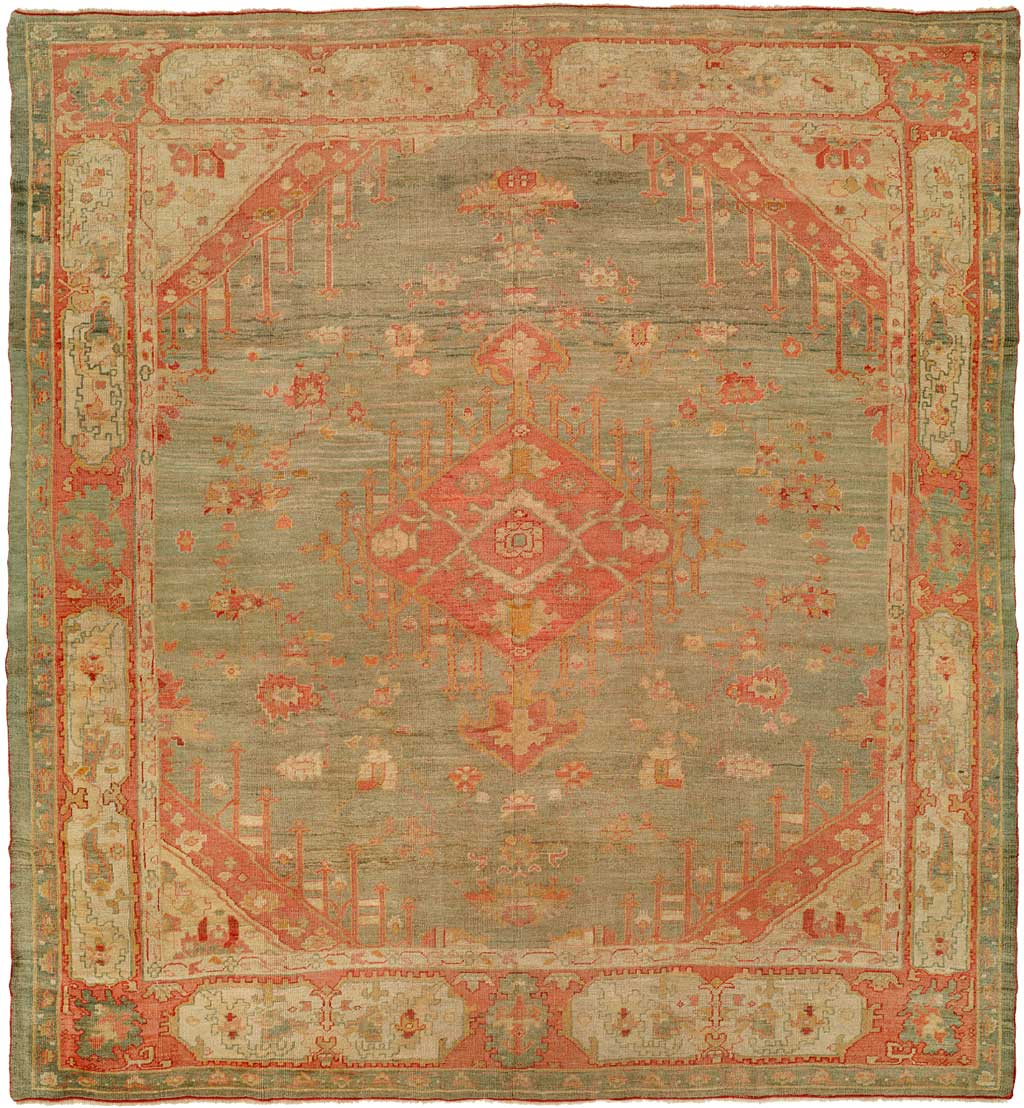
Ushak carpet, Ottoman Empire

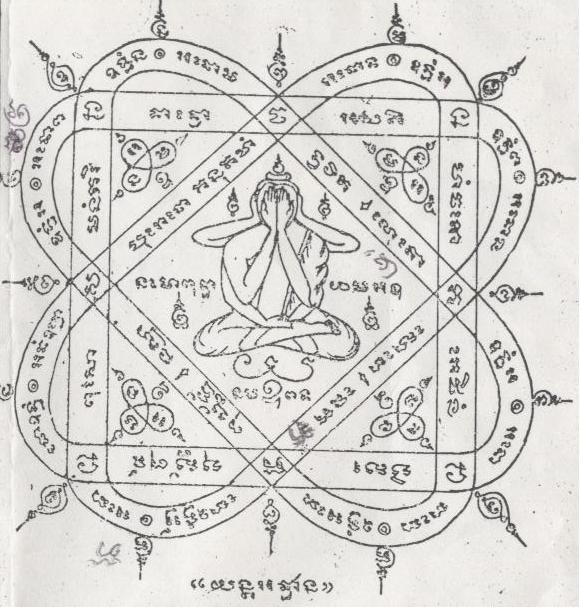
Khatha, sacred Yantra amulet from Thailand

Hindu Star of Lakshmi

Muslim Rub el Hizb

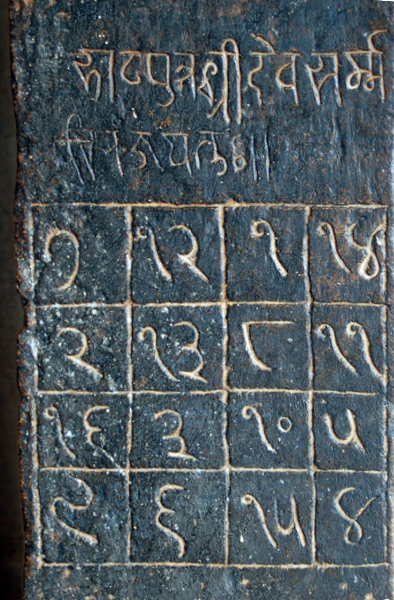
Magic squares were used as amulets

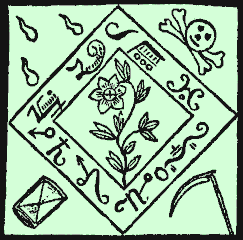
Talisman design from an 18th-century French grimoire

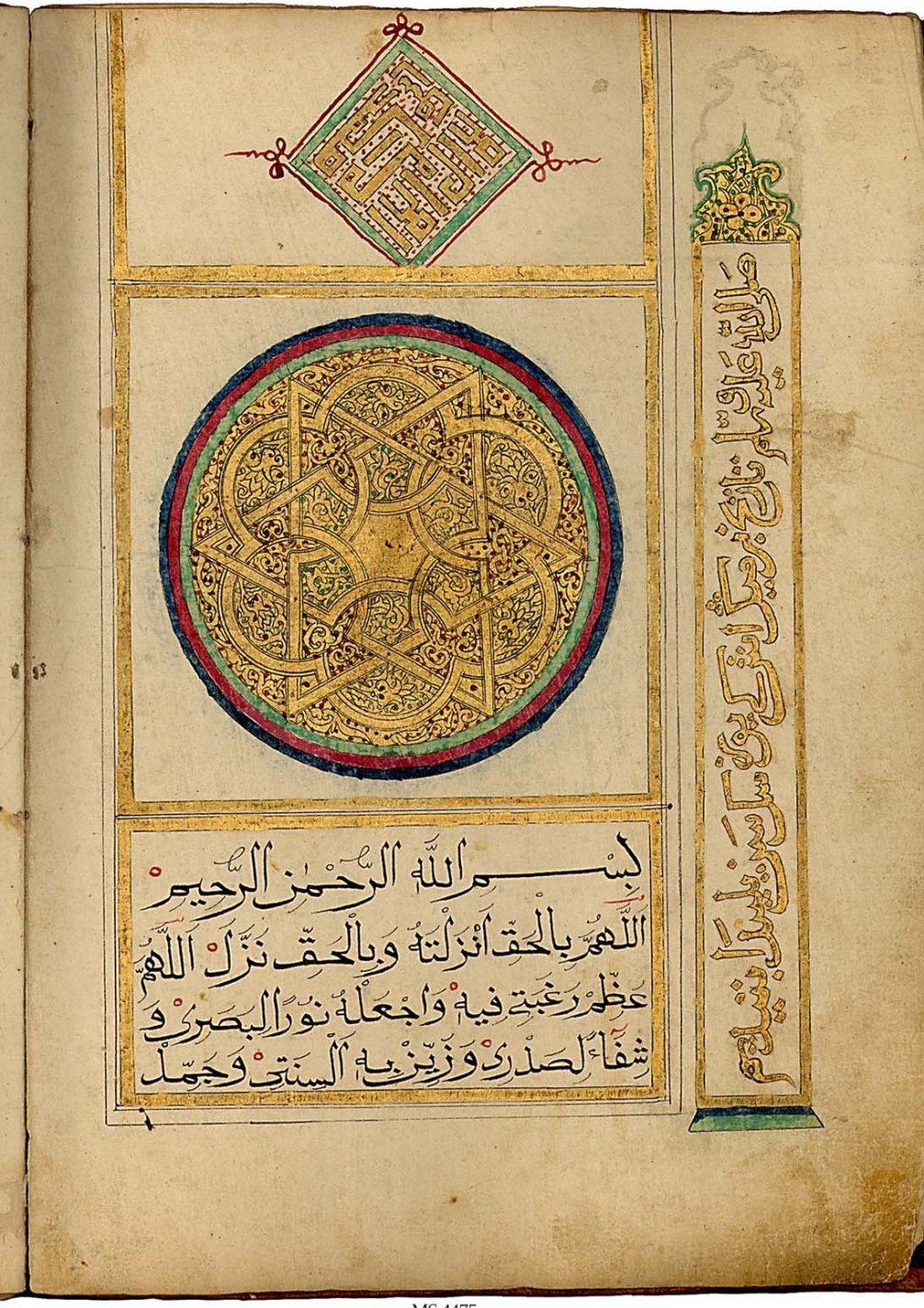
Arabic manuscript China, 16th Century

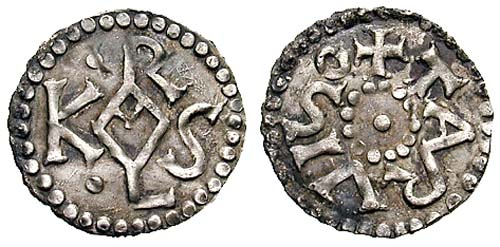
Charlemagne coins, denier or denaro c. 771–793

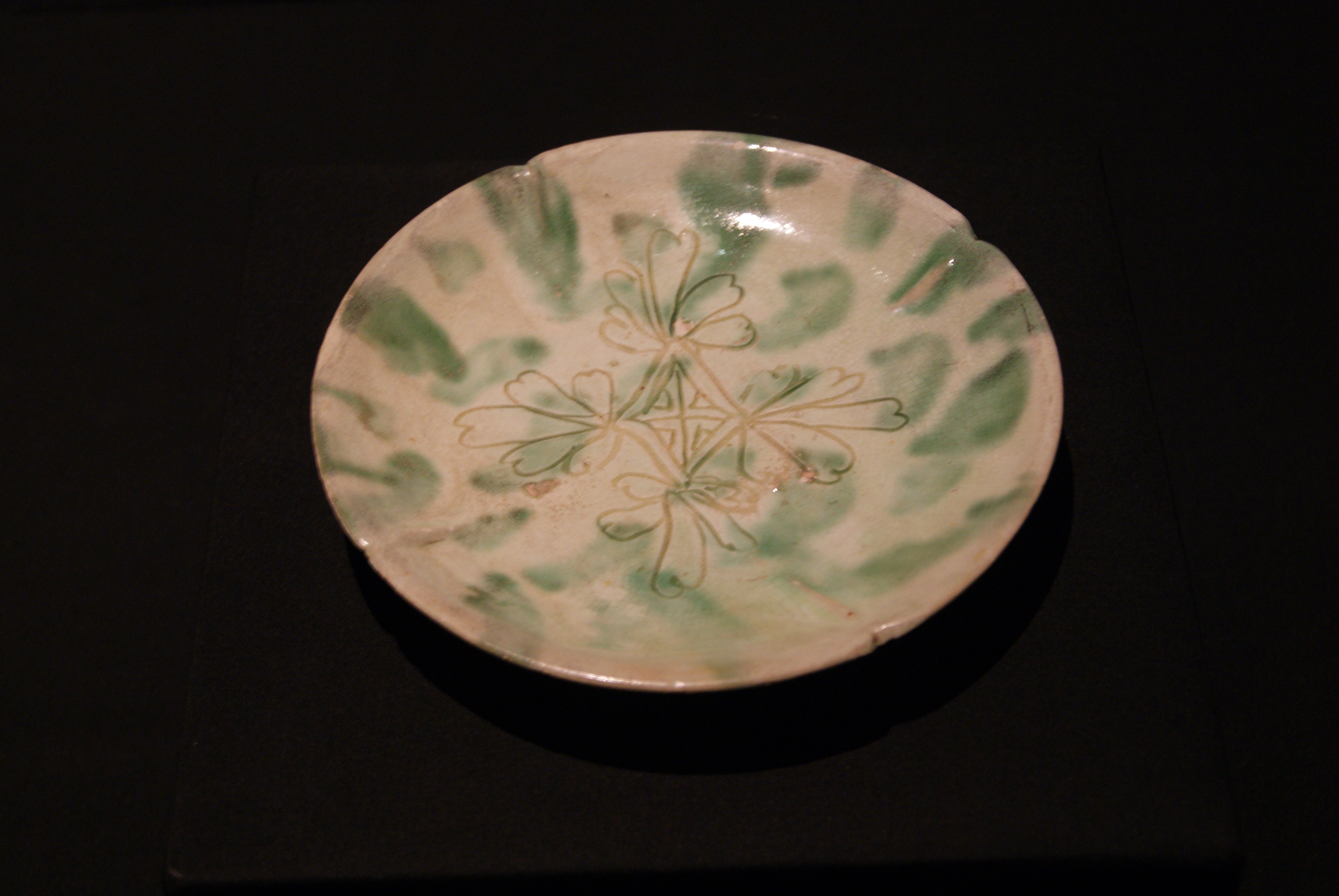
Belitung shipwreck, Tang dynasty c. 825

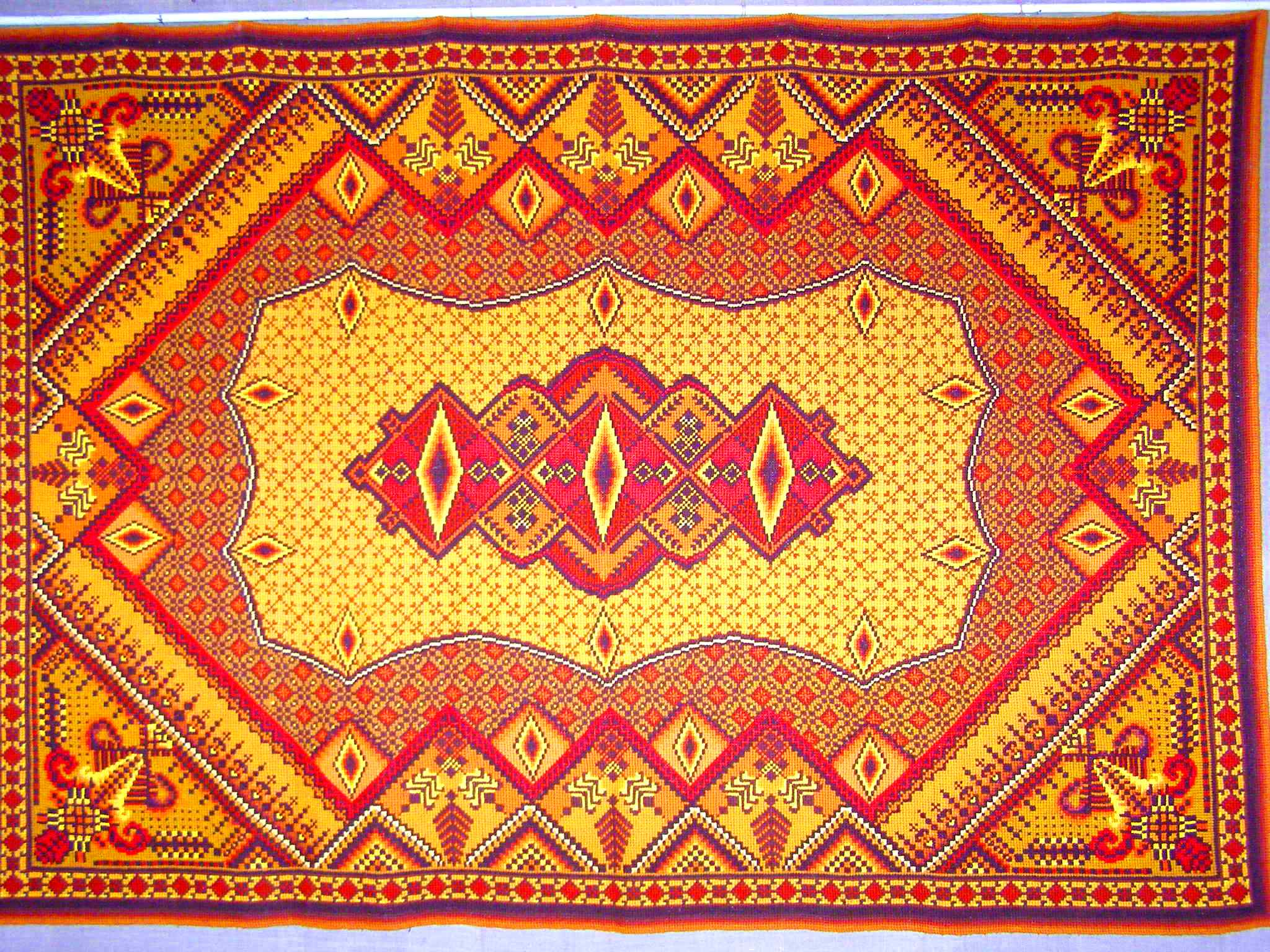
Traditional sown field pattern of Western Ukraine

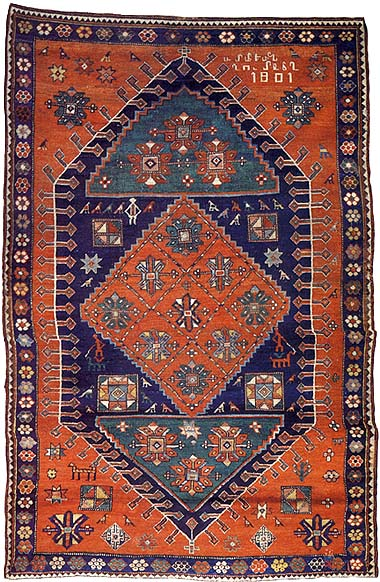
Armenian tapestry

Rongorongo proto-writing, possible lunar calendar calculating device

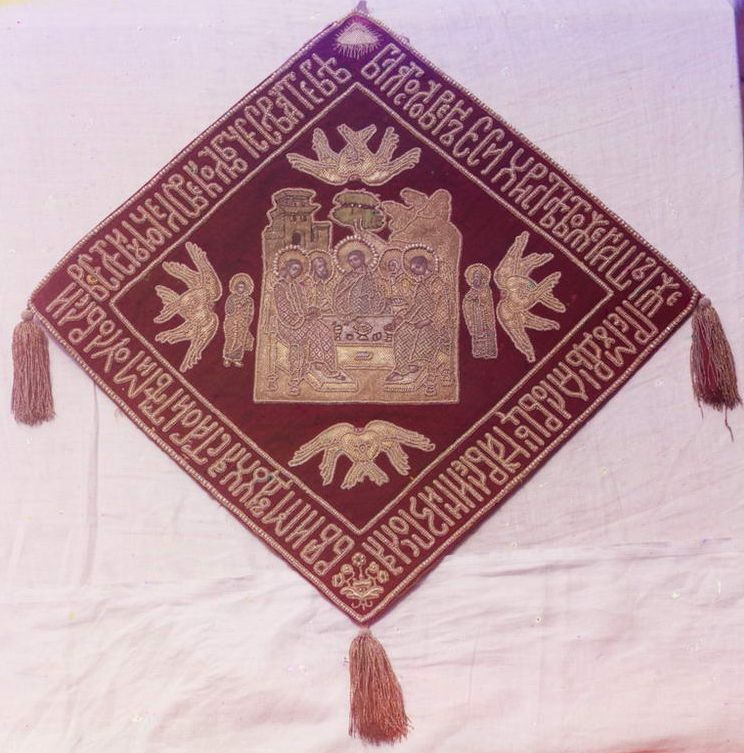
Epigonation in Eastern Christianity

Greek Classical elements

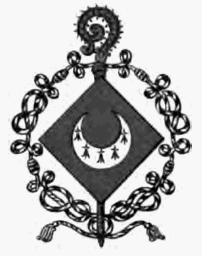
In Ecclesiastical heraldry lozenge shape is reserved for women

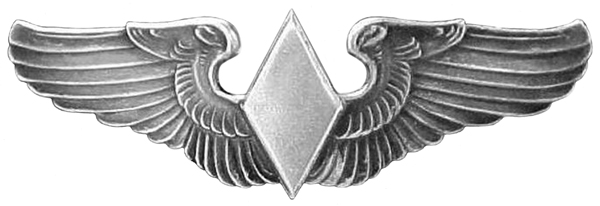
Women Airforce Service Pilots Badge

Philippine Air Force roundel

Mitsubishi logo

Renault logo

SV Werder Bremen crest

National flag of Belarus with sown field pattern

National flag of Saint Vincent and the Grenadines

Lozenge-shaped coat of arms is reserved for women

Ace of diamonds

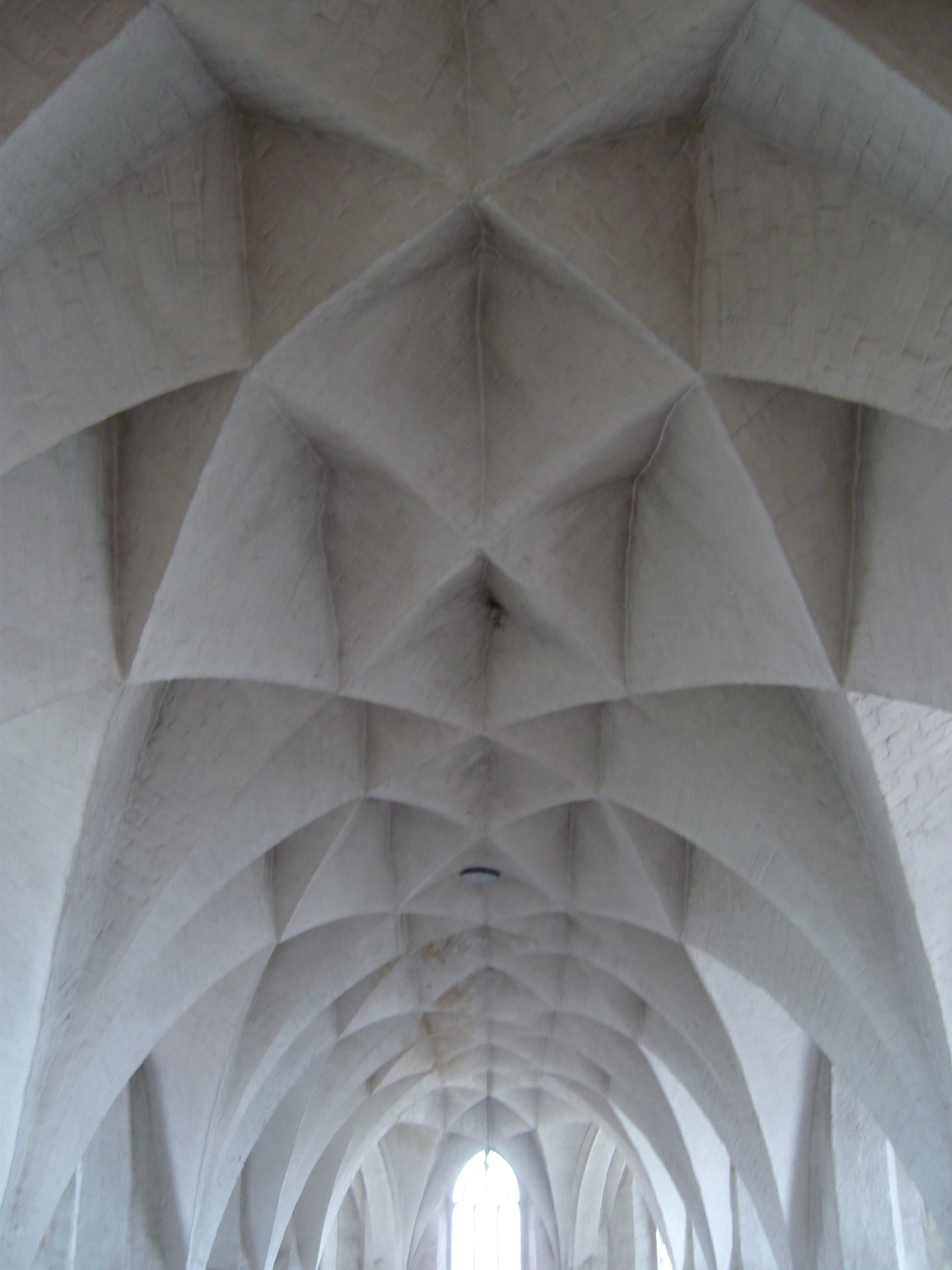
Diamond vault in German architecture

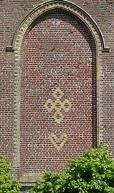
Rune-shaped designs (five-lozenges cross and heart) on the gable of Ledringhem's church

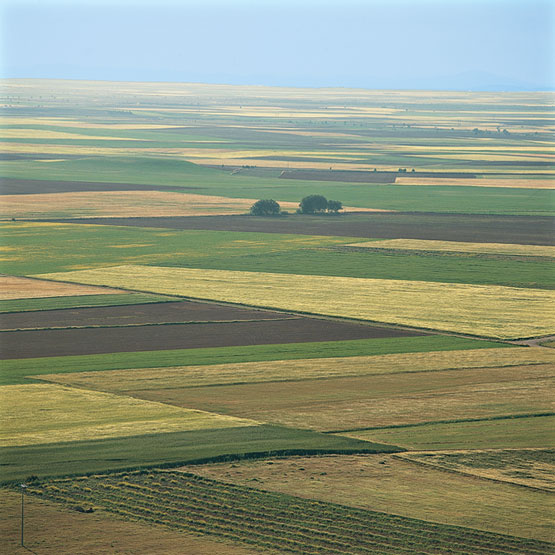
Sown fields in an open field system of farming

Czech and Slovak píča symbol

== See also ==
- Parallelepiped, 3-D Lozenge
- Petrosomatoglyph, lozenges as symbols in prehistory
