= Višňová (Příbram District) =

- Municipality
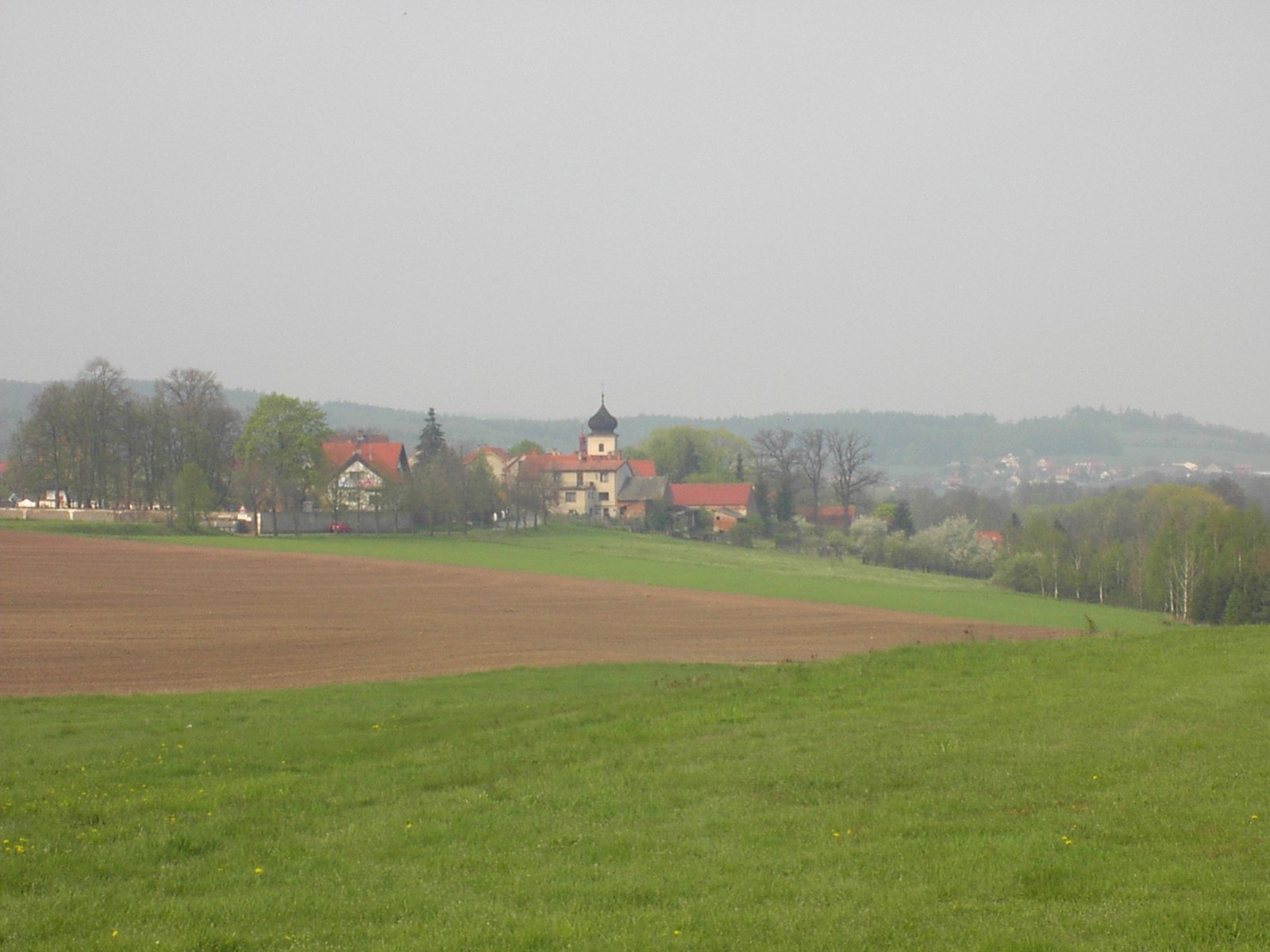
- Panorama of Višňová

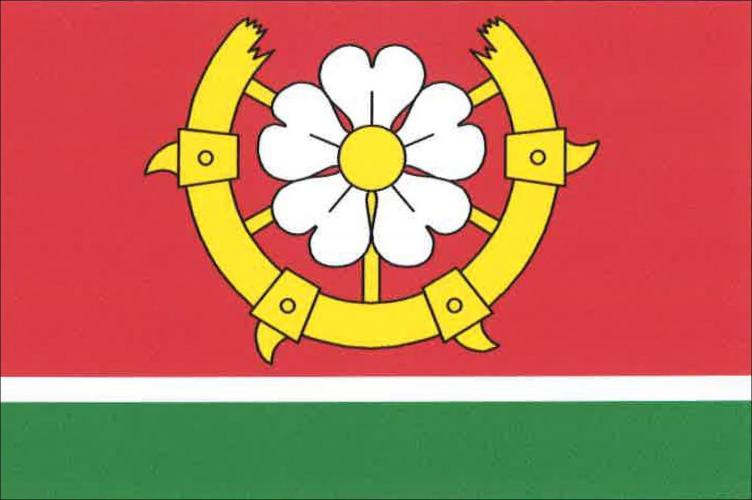
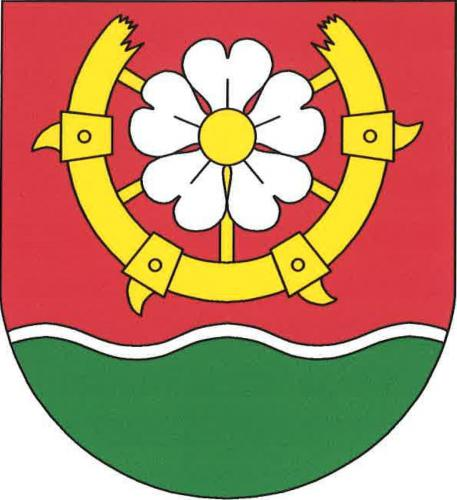
- Flag Coat of arms

- Location in the Czech Republic
- Coordinates: 49°42′21″N 14°8′44″E
- Country: Czech Republic
- Region: Central Bohemian
- District: Příbram
- First mentioned: 1369

Area
  - Total: 17.17 km^{2} (6.63 sq mi)
- Elevation: 411 m (1,348 ft)

Population (2026-01-01)
  - Total: 720
  - Density: 42/km^{2} (110/sq mi)
- Time zone: UTC+1 (CET)
  - Summer (DST): UTC+2 (CEST)
- Postal code: 262 61
- Website: www.visnova.cz

Višňová is a municipality and village in Příbram District in the Central Bohemian Region of the Czech Republic. It has about 700 inhabitants.

== Etymology ==
The word višňová is an adjective derived from the Czech word višeň, i.e. 'sour cherry'.

== Geography ==
Višňová is located about 9 kilometres (6 mi) east of Příbram and 39 km (24 mi) southwest of Prague. It lies in the Benešov Uplands. The highest point is at 572 m (1,877 ft) above sea level. The Kocába River flows through the municipality.

== History ==
The first written mention of Višňová is from 1369.

== Demographics ==
Historical population

Year	Pop.	±%
1869	562	—
1880	529	−5.9%
1890	599	+13.2%
1900	627	+4.7%
1910	574	−8.5%

Year	Pop.	±%
1921	577	+0.5%
1930	612	+6.1%
1950	514	−16.0%
1961	512	−0.4%
1970	491	−4.1%

Year	Pop.	±%
1980	500	+1.8%
1991	614	+22.8%
2001	595	−3.1%
2011	625	+5.0%
2021	662	+5.9%

Source: Censuses

== Transport ==
The D4 motorway from Prague to Písek runs along the western municipal border.

== Sights ==
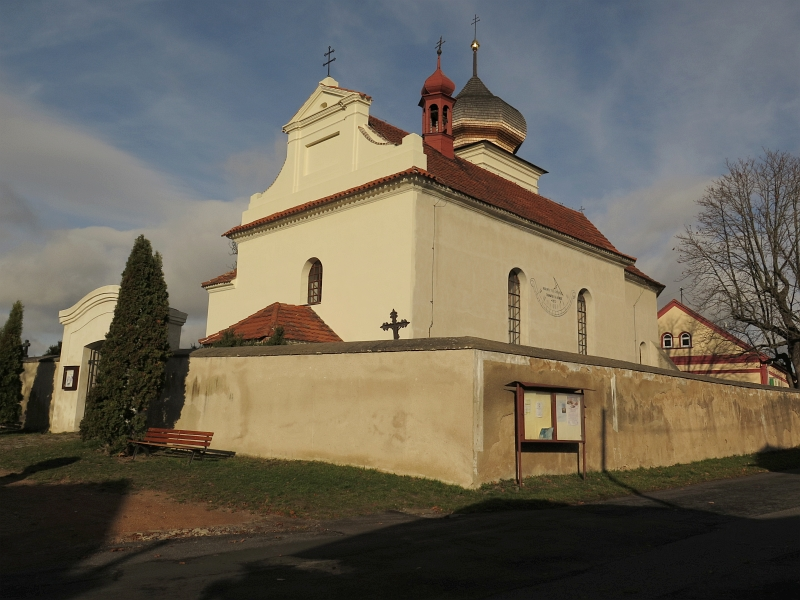
Church of Saint Catherine

The main landmark of Višňová is the Church of Saint Catherine. It was built in the Gothic style probably at the turn of the 13th and 14th centuries. At the turn of the 17th and 18th centuries, it was rebuilt in the Baroque style.

== In popular culture ==
Višňová is nationwide known for featuring in the TV series Chalupáři in the mid-1970s.

== Notable people ==
- Antonín Máša (1935–2001), film director and screenwriter
