= Proč nevěřit na zázraky =

Pro nevěřit na zázraky (English: Why Not Believe in Miracles?) is a 1977 Czechoslovak film. It was directed by Antonín Máša. The film starred Josef Kemr and Jiřina Třebická
