= Milostín =

- Municipality
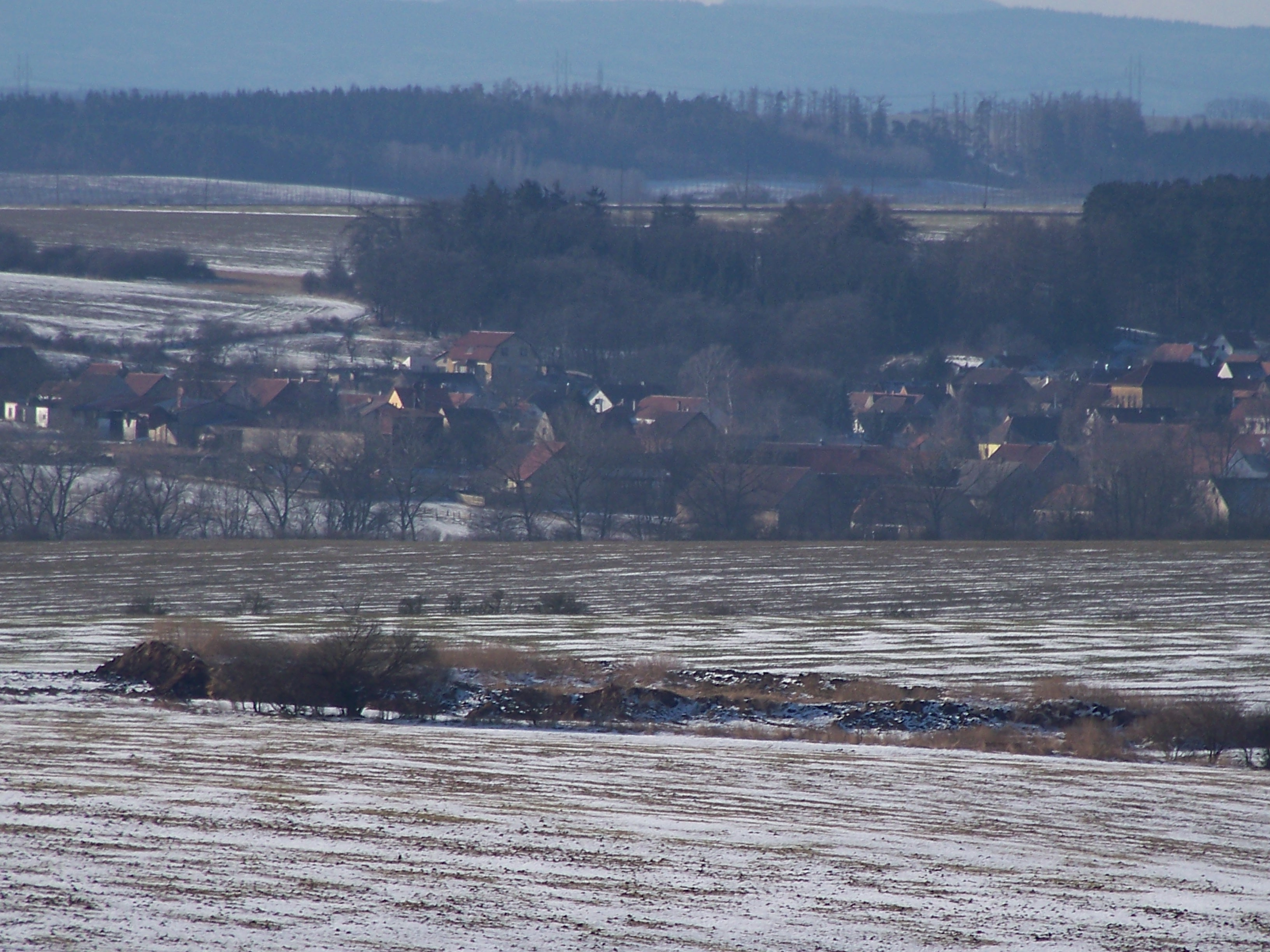
- View from the east

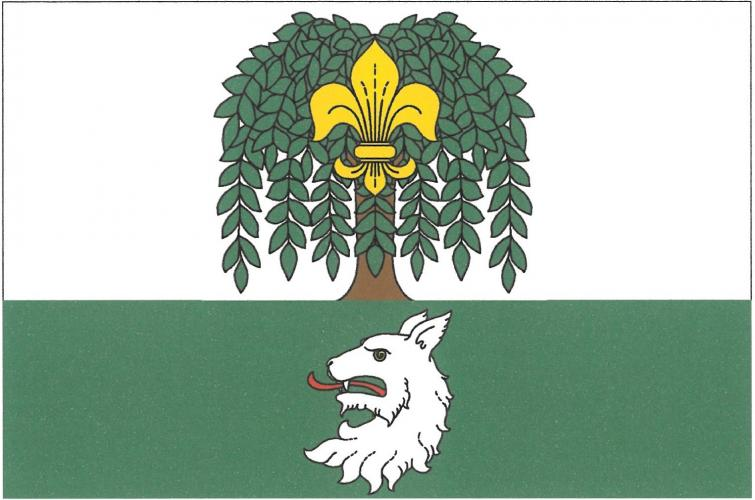
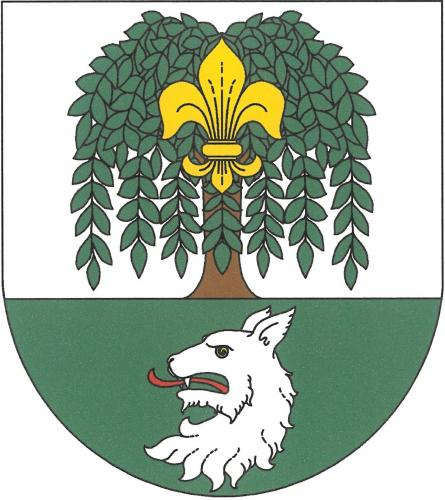
- Flag Coat of arms

- Location in the Czech Republic
- Coordinates: 50°11′38″N 13°40′9″E
- Country: Czech Republic
- Region: Central Bohemian
- District: Rakovník
- First mentioned: 1115

Area
  - Total: 7.18 km^{2} (2.77 sq mi)
- Elevation: 382 m (1,253 ft)

Population (2026-01-01)
  - Total: 312
  - Density: 43.5/km^{2} (113/sq mi)
- Time zone: UTC+1 (CET)
  - Summer (DST): UTC+2 (CEST)
- Postal code: 270 04
- Website: www.obec-milostin.cz

Milostín is a municipality and village in Rakovník District in the Central Bohemian Region of the Czech Republic. It has about 300 inhabitants.

== Administrative division ==
Milostín consists of two municipal parts (in brackets population according to the 2021 census):

- Milostín (220)
- Povlčín (66)

== Demographics ==
Historical population
| Year | Pop. | ±% |
|---|---|---|
| 1869 | 714 | — |
| 1880 | 761 | +6.6% |
| 1890 | 736 | −3.3% |
| 1900 | 817 | +11.0% |
| 1910 | 843 | +3.2% |
| 1921 | 787 | −6.6% |
| 1930 | 747 | −5.1% |
| 1950 | 532 | −28.8% |
| 1961 | 513 | −3.6% |
| 1970 | 419 | −18.3% |
| 1980 | 326 | −22.2% |
| 1991 | 259 | −20.6% |
| 2001 | 273 | +5.4% |
| 2011 | 295 | +8.1% |
| 2021 | 286 | −3.1% |
Source: Censuses

== Notable people ==
- Jiří Pleskot (1922–1997), actor
