= Albert (1985 film) =

1985 film

- Written by: Dušan Mitana
- Directed by: František Vláčil
- Starring: Jaroslav Filip, Jan Kačer
- Music by: Jarmil Burghauser
- Country of origin: Czechoslovakia

Production
- Cinematography: Jaromír Šofr
- Editor: Miroslav Hájek
- Running time: 70 Minutes
- Production company: Slovenská televízia

Original release
- Release: 1985

Albert is a 1985 Czechoslovak film directed by František Vláčil. It is based on a short story by Lev Nikolaevic Tolstoj. Vláčil made the film for Slovak television. It has won an award at Tokyo International Film Festival. Vláčil's health was poor at the time of shooting which led to many difficulties.

== Cast ==
- Jaroslav Filip as Albert
- Jan Kačer as hrabě Delesov
- Peter Debnár as sluha Zachar
- Zora Kolínska as Anna Ivanovna
- Elena Kucháriková
- Ivan Romančík
- František Rebarbora
- Jiří Menzel
