= Hvězdy nad hlavou =

- Genre: Romantic comedy
- Directed by: Martin Kopp; David Laňka; Martin Müller
- Starring: Tereza Kostková; Roman Vojtek; Roman Zach
- Country of origin: Czech Republic
- Original language: Czech
- No. of seasons: 1
- No. of episodes: 16

Production
- Running time: 59–63 minutes

Original release
- Network: Prima televize
- Release: August 30 – December 13, 2021

Hvězdy nad hlavou (Stars over Head) is a Czech romantic comedy television series that was broadcast by Prima televize in 2021. The series takes place in the village of Poběžovice and tells the story of veterinarian Lucia Boučková, who saves not only animals, but also human destinies. In her personal life, she decides between two men in order to secure a happy future for herself and her son Filip. Producers Tomáš Hoffman, Jana Gospičová and directors Martin Kopp and David Laňka are behind the creation of the series.

The series, consisting of sixteen parts, was filmed in the summer and autumn of 2020 in exteriors in Rokycany. The series premiered on 30 August 2021 in prime time. The premiere of the series became the most watched program of the evening, the first episode was watched by 1,163,000 viewers.

== Cast ==
- Tereza Kostková as MVDr. Lucie Boučková
- Roman Vojtek as Jiří Bouček
- Roman Zach as Ing. Jan Veselý
- Veronika Khek Kubařová as teacher Pavlína Nejezchlebová
- Filip Antonio as Filip Bouček
- Pavel Zedníček as Václav Bouček
- Jitka Smutná as Marie Boučková
- Veronika Žilková as Marcela Šímová
- Václav Kopta as bus driver Pavel Šíma
- Amelie Pokorná as Kristýna Nejezchlebová
- Miroslav Táborský as starosta a předseda družstva Karel Snop
- Jaromír Dulava as Radek Macháně
- Ondřej Bauer as Franta Douša
- Bolek Polívka as Jindřich Prokeš
- Alena Mihulová as Jitka Prokešová
- Kateřina Marie Fialová as Táňa Prokešová
- Petr Nárožný as MUDr. Otakar Mrázek
- Martin Pechlát as Standa Tuček
- Oldřich Vlach as Alois Karásek
- Eva Leinweberová as Vlasta Snopová
- Pavlína Mourková as Božena
- Anna Schmidtmajerová as Květa
- Prokop Zach as Roman Macháně
- Anita Krausová as Magda
- Lukáš Příkazký as Michal Zemánek
- Matěj Havelka as František Válek
- Radka Pavlovčinová as Kateřina
- Adam Ernest as Patrik
- Vasil Fridrich as Miloš
- Nela Boudová as social worker Evženie Budková
