= Zora Kolínska =

Slovak actress and singer

- Born: 27 July 1941; Kráľova Lehota, Slovakia
- Died: 17 June 2002 (aged 60); Bratislava, Slovakia
- Occupation: Actress
- Years active: 1964-1999

Zora Kolínska (27 July 1941 – 17 June 2002) was a Slovak actress and singer. She studied at the Academy of Performing Arts in Bratislava (VŠMU). At the 1998 DOSKY Awards she won in the category of Best Actress, for her performances in the play Scény z Domu Bessemenovcov - Meštiaci.

== Selected filmography ==
- Ve znamení Merkura (television, 1978)
- Sladké starosti (1984)
- Albert (1985)
- Alžbetin dvor (television, 1986)
