= Sexual Perversity in Chicago =

Play written by David Mamet

- Original language: English
- Written by: David Mamet
- Genre: Drama, comedy
- Setting: Chicago

Premiere
- Date: 1974
- Place: Organic Theater Company

Sexual Perversity in Chicago is a play written by David Mamet that examines the sex lives of two men and two women in the 1970s. The play is filled with profanity and regional jargon that reflects the working-class language of Chicago. The characters' relationships come to be corroded by the caustic nature of their words, as much of the dialogue includes insults and arguments. The play presents "intimate relationships [as] minefields of buried fears and misunderstandings."

The play has twice been adapted for film as About Last Night, first in 1986, then again in 2014.

== Characters and plot ==
- Dan Shapiro: An urban male in his late twenties
- Bernard Litko: Dan's friend and associate
- Deborah Soloman: A woman in her late twenties
- Joan Webber: Deborah's friend and roommate

Scene: Various spots around the North Side of Chicago, a Big City on a Lake.
Time: Approximately nine weeks one summer.

Danny and Bernie balance their mundane office jobs with sexual banter, particularly their experiences and preferences in the bedroom. Likewise, Joan and Deborah frequently discuss the shortcomings of men while at their apartment.

The main plot point is Danny and Deborah's relationship, driving much of the dialogue about men and women. Their romance is quickly established by sexual attraction, but as the play progresses and Deborah moves into Danny's apartment, they are unable to talk with each other seriously. Danny complains in frustration, "Everything's fine. Sex, talk, life, everything. Until you want to get 'closer', to get 'better'. Do you know what the fuck you want?" When the couple eventually breaks up, Danny and Bernie revert to their usual talk about "broads" and what is wrong with the world.

Joan says:

I don't know anything, Deborah, I swear to God, the older I get the less I know. (pause) It's a puzzle. Our efforts at coming to grips with ourselves ... in an attempt to become "more human" (which, in itself, is an interesting concept). It has to do with an increased ability to recognize clues... and the control of energy in the form of lust... and desire (And also in the form of hope)... But a finite puzzle. Whose true solution lies, perhaps, in transcending the rules themselves ... (pause) ... and pounding of the fucking pieces into places where they do not fit at all.

== Production history ==
An early version of Sexual Perversity in Chicago was first produced at Goddard College in Plainfield, Vermont by the members of St. Nicholas Theater. The production was directed by Mamet.

The play was a series of blackouts showing various people (waitresses, policemen, investment bankers) having discussions about sex. It featured:

- William H. Macy
- Steven Schachter
- Alison Zucker
- Mary Tibbetts
- Madeleine Dammers
- Peter Vincent

The play was subsequently reworked by Mamet with director Stuart Gordon into the four character structure that made it famous and established David Mamet as a playwright. An earlier Mamet play, Danny Shapiro and his Search for the Mystery Princess, was combined with Sexual Perversity, adding the characters of Bernie Litko and Joan Webber. It was produced and performed by Organic Theater Company in Chicago in June 1974 in a production directed by Stuart Gordon. The cast featured:

- Warren Casey as Bernie Litko
- Eric Loeb as Danny Shapiro
- Carolyn Purdy Gordon as Deborah Soloman
- Roberta Custer as Joan Webber

In December 1975, the play was mounted off-off Broadway at the St. Clements Theatre in New York. An off-Broadway production directed by Albert Takazauckas opened on a double bill with the playwright's The Duck Variations on June 16, 1976 at the Cherry Lane Theatre in Greenwich Village and ran for 273 performances. The cast included F. Murray Abraham and Peter Riegert. Subsequent cast members included Jeff Zinn.

Jake Johannsen first thought of being a comedian when trying out for the Iowa State production of Sexual Perversity in Chicago in the early 1980s.

=== Blancs-Manteaux Theatre ===
In 1980, the play was mounted at the Blancs-Manteaux Theatre in Paris, with Daniel Russo and Nathalie Courval.

=== West End Theatre ===
In 2003, Matthew Perry made his stage debut in a West End production co-starring Minnie Driver, Hank Azaria, and Kelly Reilly.

=== Činoherní klub ===
Directed by Ondřej Sokol, the play premiered on 18 March 2004 in The Drama Club, Prague.

- Bernard Litko .... Jaromír Dulava
- Joan Weber .... Ivana Chýlková
- Dan Shapiro .... Marek Taclík
- Deborah Solomon .... Lucie Pernetová

== Film adaptations ==
David De Silva bought the motion picture rights to Sexual Perversity In Chicago and went with David Mamet on Mamet's first trip to Hollywood, to meet with Michael Eisner, head of Paramount Pictures, regarding doing a film version of the play. Eisner was very enthusiastic about the project, but Mamet ultimately was not able to deliver an acceptable screenplay to the studio. Years later, De Silva sold the film rights to a Chicago producer, Stuart Oken. Oken produced the 1986 film, About Last Night, directed by Edward Zwick, with Demi Moore, Rob Lowe, Jim Belushi and Elizabeth Perkins in the cast. The screenplay was written by Tim Kazurinsky and Denise Declue. The title change resulted from many newspapers refusing to advertise a movie with the original title.

Mamet disavowed the movie, ruefully recalling that "as a callow youth with hay sticking out of my ears, I sold both the play and the screenplay for about $12 and a mess of porridge".

A second film adaptation, also based on the 1986 film and again titled About Last Night, was released in 2014. This film had an African-American cast and was set in Los Angeles. The film starred Kevin Hart, Michael Ealy, Regina Hall and Joy Bryant.
