= Dům pro dva =

1988 Czechoslovak drama film

- Directed by: Miloš Zábranský
- Written by: Rudolf Ráž
- Produced by: Blažej Vráb
- Starring: Ondřej Vetchý; Jiří Schmitzer; Ivana Velichová; Jiřina Třebická; Jaroslav Mareš; Zdena Sajfertová; Miloslav Maršálek; Jan Hraběta; Jana Marková
- Cinematography: Martin Benoni
- Music by: Jan Paukert and Pavel Dražan
- Distributed by: Ústřední půjčovna filmů
- Release date: 1988
- Running time: 78 minutes
- Country: Czechoslovakia
- Language: Czech

Dům pro dva (English: House for Two) is a 1988 Czechoslovak drama film directed by Miloš Zábranský. This film stars two of the most recognized Czech actors, Ondřej Vetchý who plays Dan, and Jiří Schmitzer as Bóza.

== Plot ==
The story is about two brothers, both competing for the affection of their ailing mother, the friendship of their workmates and the love of a beautiful woman.

Boza, the older brother dedicates himself to hard work at the printing plant where they are both employed. His younger brother Dan slacks off and loots the factory for things to sell on the black market. He drinks with his friends at the local bar and has sex with many loose women.

When Boza falls in love with a beautiful coworker, Dan has sex with her just to spite his older brother (in a very shocking sex scene). Dan's torment and cruelty to his older brother continues until it has a shocking result.

Set in the dark world of Communist era Czechoslovakia, this disturbing film targets the very cruel nature of human beings to take advantage of those less fortunate. It also targets the corruption of the world in which the characters live.
