= Antonín Máša =

Czechoslovak film director

- Born: 22 July 1935; Višňová, Czechoslovakia (now Czech Republic)
- Died: 4 October 2001 (aged 66); Příbram, Czech Republic
- Occupations: Film director Screenwriter
- Years active: 1960-1990

Antonín Máša (22 July 1935 – 4 October 2001) was a Czech film director and screenwriter. His movie Hotel for Strangers competed in Cannes Film Festival.

== Life ==
Máša was born in Višňová on 22 July 1935. He was a childhood friend with Pavel Juráček. They both went to study screenwriting at Film and TV School of the Academy of Performing Arts in Prague.

== Filmography ==
=== As screenwriter ===
- A Place in the Group (1964)
- Courage for Every Day (1965)
- Holiday for a Dog (1980)
- What’s the Matter With You, Doctor? (1984)

=== As director ===
- Searching (1965)
- Hotel for Strangers (1967)
- Looking Back (1968)
- Rodeo (1972)
- Proč nevěřit na zázraky (1977)
- Silence of the Larks (1989)
- Were We Really Like This? (1990)
