= Hotel for Strangers =

1967 film

- Directed by: Antonín Máša
- Written by: Antonín Máša
- Starring: Petr Čepek
- Cinematography: Ivan Slapeta
- Release date: 1967
- Running time: 103 minutes
- Country: Czechoslovakia
- Language: Czech

Hotel for Strangers (Czech: Hotel pro cizince) is a 1967 Czechoslovak comedy film directed by Antonín Máša. It was entered into the 1967 Cannes Film Festival. The film reconstructs the last days of murdered young poet Petr Hudec (Petr Čepek), from the random entries of his journal, after he registers at the Hotel Svet.

== Cast ==
- Petr Čepek as Petr Hudec
- Táňa Fischerová as Veronika
- Marta Krásová as Rosická
- Vladimír Šmeral as Blech
- Evald Schorm as Curate
- Jiří Hrzán as Kája
- Jiří Pleskot as Hotel trustee
- Jiřina Jirásková as Marie
- Ladislav Mrkvička as Vladimír
- Jiří Kodet as Jirí
- Jiří Menzel as Pot-boy
- Jan Libíček as Hynek
- Josef Somr as Receptionist
- Waldemar Matuška as Otomar
- Jan Kačer as Narrator (voice)
- Evelyna Juhanová as Ruzena
