= The Blunder =

The Blunder (Czech: Ptákovina, lit. 'Poultry') is a Czech play by Milan Kundera.

== Productions ==
=== Činoherní klub, Prague ===
- Directed by Ladislav Smoček. Preview was 9 June 2008, 11 June 2008 and 13 June 2008. The premiere was 19 September 2008 in The Drama Club, Prague.
- Chairman .... Jaromír Dulava
- Director .... Ondřej Vetchý
- Eva .... Lucie Žáčková
- Růžena .... Marika Sarah Procházková
- Mother .... Lenka Skopalová
- Schoolboy .... David Šír / Braňo Holiček
- Mrs. Prušánková .... Jana Břežková
- Gym master .... Pavel Kikinčuk
- An old teacher .... Milan Riehs / Stanislav Zindulka
- Teacher of Drawing .... Petr Meissel
- Manager of Building .... Nela Boudová / Lada Jelínková
- Schoolboy .... Jonáš Zbořil / Jiří Moudrý / Matěj Nechvátal / Šimon Stiburek
- School porter .... Stanislav Štícha
- Younger with long hairs .... Daniel Pešl
