= Days of Betrayal =

1973 film

- Directed by: Otakar Vávra
- Written by: Miloslav Fábera; Otakar Vávra
- Produced by: Ladislav Kalas; Gustav Rohan
- Starring: Jiří Pleskot
- Cinematography: Jaromír Sofr
- Release date: April 1973
- Running time: 227 minutes
- Country: Czechoslovakia
- Language: Czech

Days of Betrayal (Czech: Dny zrady) is a 1973 Czechoslovak drama film directed by Otakar Vávra. The film was entered into the 8th Moscow International Film Festival, where it won a Diploma. It was also selected as the Czechoslovak entry for the Best Foreign Language Film at the 46th Academy Awards, but was not accepted as a nominee. The film was meant as the first part of Vávra's "war trilogy" consisting of movies Days of Betrayal, Sokolovo and Liberation of Prague.

== Cast ==
- Jiří Pleskot as Dr. Edvard Beneš
- Bohuš Pastorek as Klement Gottwald
- Gunnar Möller as Adolf Hitler
- Jaroslav Radimecký as Neville Chamberlain
- Martin Gregor as Édouard Daladier
- Bořivoj Navrátil as Sergey S. Alexandrovsky
- Otakar Brousek Sr. as Bonnet
- Josef Langmiler as Cooper
- Rudolf Krátký as Dr. Paul Schmidt – Hitler's interpreter
- Günter Zschieschow as K. H. Frank
- Fred Alexander as Joseph Goebbels
- Rudolf Jurda as Hermann Göring

== See also ==
- List of submissions to the 46th Academy Awards for Best Foreign Language Film
- List of Czechoslovak submissions for the Academy Award for Best Foreign Language Film
