= Jiřina Třebická =

Czech actress

- Born: 1 November 1930; Prague, Czechoslovakia
- Died: 23 January 2005 (aged 74); Prague, Czech Republic
- Occupation: Actress
- Years active: 1947–2000
- Children: Marcela Sidon
- Relatives: grandma of actor Daniel Sidon, actress Halka Třešňáková and Jakub Třešňák

Jiřina Třebická (1 November 1930 – 23 January 2005) was a Czech dancer and theatre and film actress.

== Career ==
Her artistic career began first as a dancer in regional theaters. Since 1947, she worked in urban theatres in Most and České Budějovice and then moved to Ostrava where she worked since 1953 in a Dramatical ensemble of Petr Bezruč. Remained there until 1965 when, together with actor and director Jan Kačer and other colleagues stood before the founding of The Drama Club, where she was engaged in constant until 1993, featured a guest here still in 2000.

== Filmography ==
Year	Title	Role	Notes
1967	Návrat ztraceného syna		
1969	Ohlédnutí	Olga Machová	
1971	Sance	Jiřina	
1971	Pet muzu a jedno srdce	Journalist	
1973	Rodeo	Imrich's mother	
1975	Poslední ples na roznovske plovarne	Uzrilová	
1975	Plavení hríbat	Chrástková	
1978	Proc neverit na zázraky	Mrázová	
1980	Love Between the Raindrops	Married prostitute	
1981	Mateji, proc te holky nechtejí?	Bzochová	
1983	Malinový koktejl		
1983	Fandy, ó Fandy	kreslička Suchá	
1984	Evo, vdej se!	Vanícková	
1987	Pavucina		
1988	Dům pro dva	Pístalová	
1989	Dobří holubi se vracejí	Wife of prof. Zlámal	
1990	Larks on a String	Drobečková	
1990	Skriváncí ticho		
1993	Krvavý román	Háta	
1995	Fany	Marečková	
1996	Mission: Impossible	Cleaning woman	
1997	An Ambiguous Report About the End of the World	Comedian	
2004	Up and Down	Jeno's mother	(final film role)
