= Jaromír Dulava =

Czech actor

- Born: 18 December 1960 (age 64); Frýdek-Místek, Czechoslovakia
- Occupation: Actor
- Years active: 1979–present

Jaromír Dulava (born 18 December 1960) is a Czech actor.

== Selected filmography ==
=== Film ===
- Housata (1980)
- The Inheritance or Fuckoffguysgoodday (1992)
- Černí baroni (1992)
- Dark Blue World (2001)
- Román pro ženy (2001)
- I Served the King of England (2006)
- Všechno nejlepší! (2006)
- Grandhotel (2006)
- Taková normální rodinka (2008)
- Men in Rut (2009)
- Habermann (2010)
- Milada (2017)
- Insects (2018)
- Toman (2018)
- My Uncle Archimedes (2018)
- Bourák (2020)

=== Television ===
- Konec velkých prázdnin (1996)
- Three Kings (1998)
- Hotel Herbich (1999)
- Přízraky mezi námi (2001)
- Útěk do Budína (2002)
- Místo nahoře (2004)
- Bazén (2005)
- Místo v životě (2006)
- Ach, ty vraždy! (2010)
- O mé rodině a jiných mrtvolách (2011)
- Czech Century (2013)
- Škoda lásky (2013)
- Sanitka 2 (2013)
- Neviditelní (2014)
- Život a doba soudce A. K. (2014)
- Doktor Martin (2015)
- Reportérka (2015)
- Vraždy v kruhu (2015)
- Doktorka Kellerová (2016)
- Pouť (2019)
- Most! (2019)
- Zločiny Velké Prahy (2021)
- Osada (2021)
- Hvězdy nad hlavou (2021)
- Revír (2023)

=== Play ===
- The Lonesome West (2002)
- Sexual Perversity in Chicago (2004)
- The Blunder (2008)
