= Jiří Pleskot =

Czech actor

- Born: 3 May 1922; Milostín, Czechoslovakia (now Czech Republic)
- Died: 1 December 1997 (aged 75); Prague, Czech Republic
- Occupation: Actor
- Years active: 1958 – 1990

Jiří Pleskot (3 May 1922 – 1 December 1997) was a Czech actor. He appeared in over 60 films and television shows 1958 and 1990.

== Selected filmography ==
- The End of Agent W4C (1967)
- Hotel for Strangers (1967)
- Days of Betrayal (1973)
- Léto s Kovbojem (1976)
