= Jan Kačer =

Czech actor and film director (1936–2024)

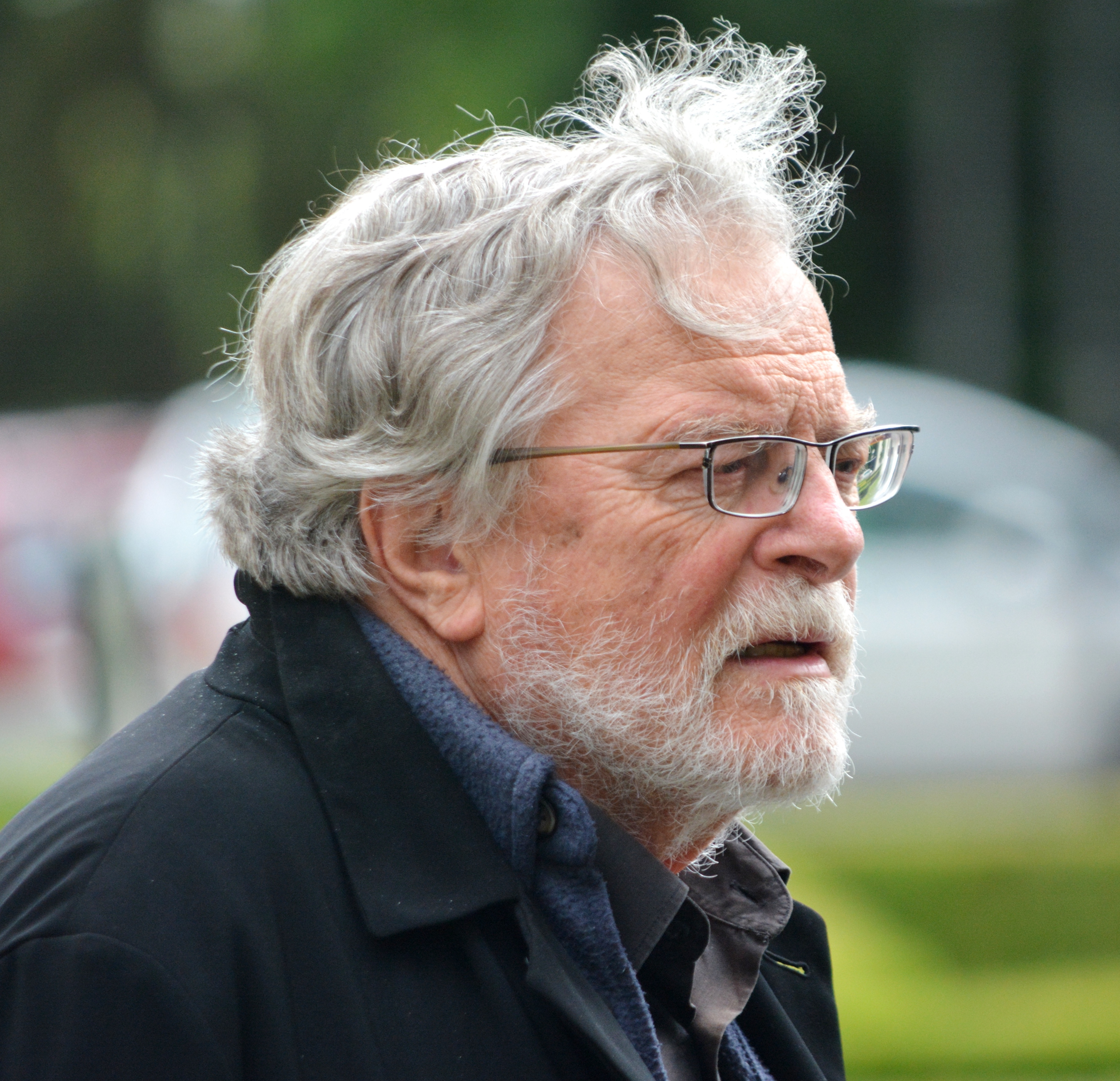
- Kačer in 2015
- Born: 3 October 1936; Holice, Czechoslovakia
- Died: 24 May 2024 (aged 87); Prague, Czech Republic
- Occupations: Actor, film director
- Years active: 1960–2023
- Spouse: Nina Divíšková (m. 1962; died 2021)

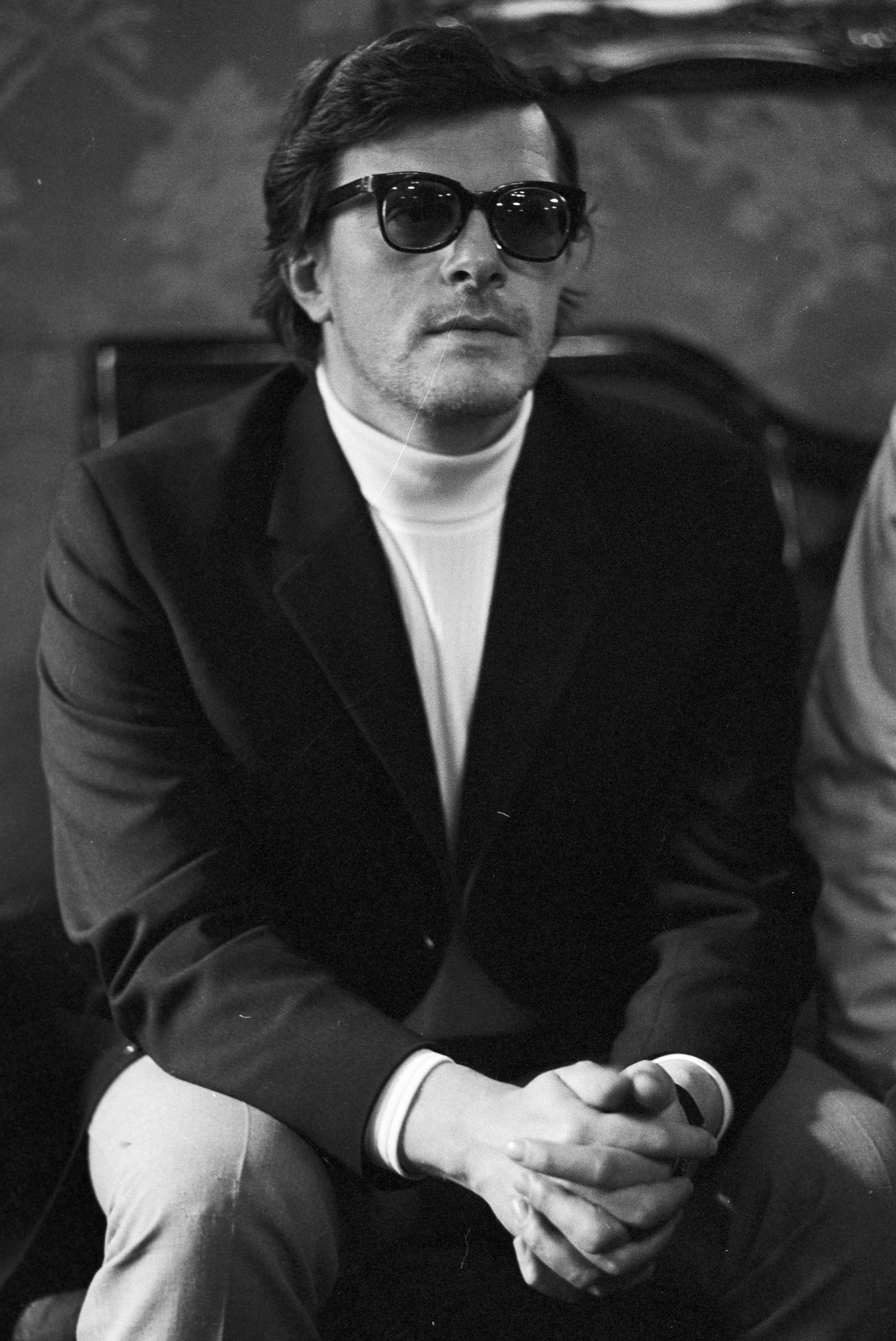
Kačer in 1971

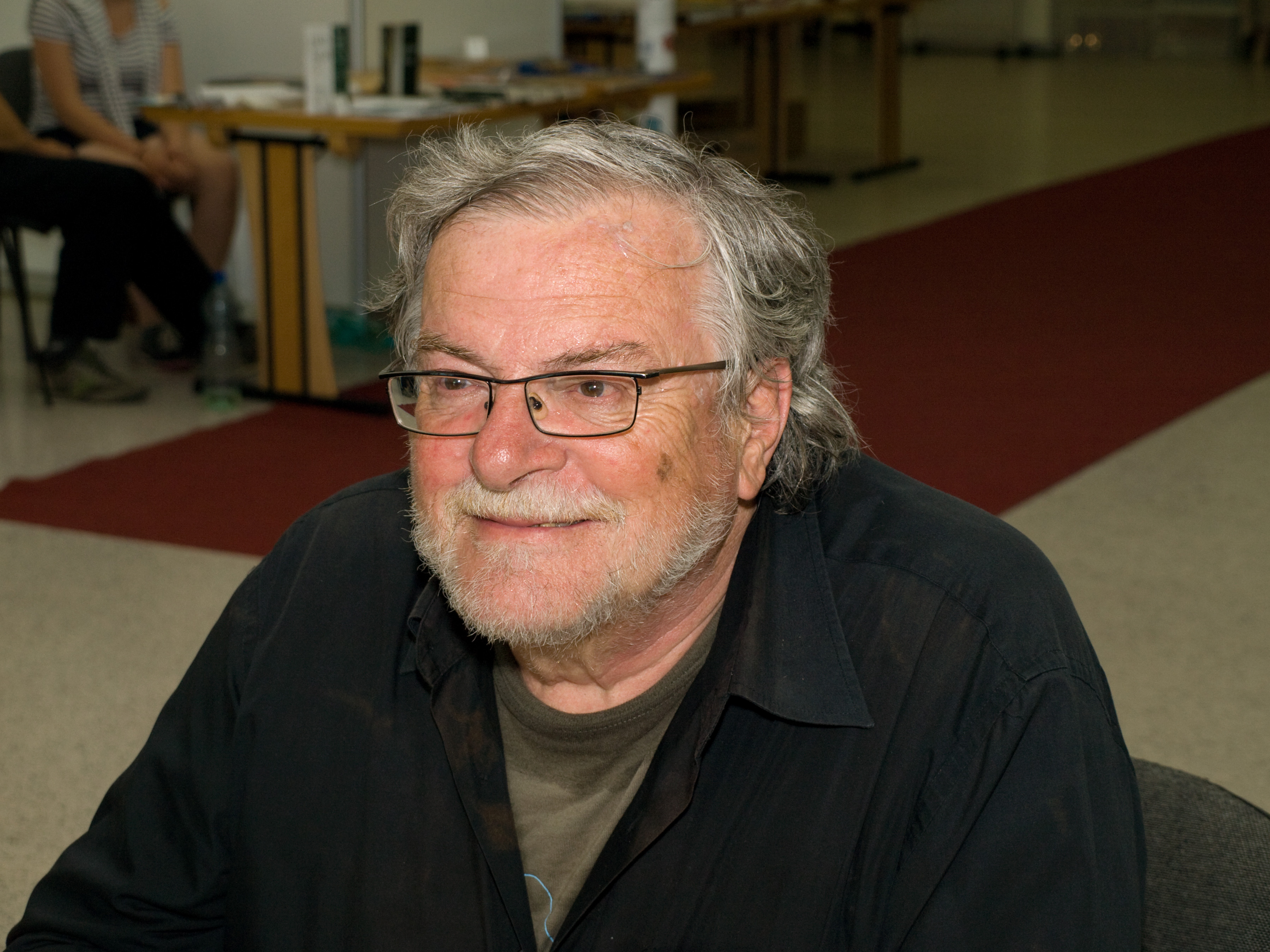
Kačer in 2012

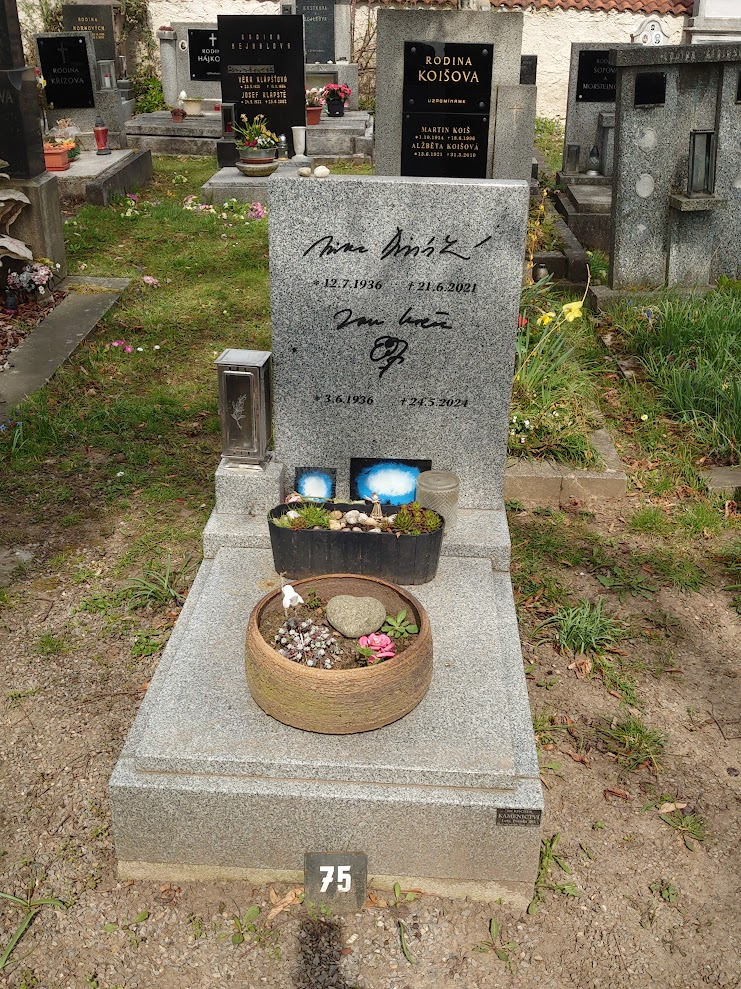
Grave

Jan Kačer (3 October 1936 – 24 May 2024) was a Czech actor and theatrical director. He appeared in more than sixty films from 1960 onwards.

== Life and career ==
Kačer studied theatrical directing at DAMU. He was an actor and a director in The Drama Club and later Theatre on the Balustrade.

Kačer was a parliamentary representative in the Federal Assembly from 1990 to 1992. His wife was the actress Nina Divíšková.

== Death ==
Kačer died on 24 May 2024, at the age of 87. His grave is located on the cemetery of Prague 5 Slivenec.

== Selected filmography ==
Year	Title	Role	Notes
1963	Death Is Called Engelchen	Pavel	
1966	The Pipes	John	
1966	The Return of the Prodigal Son	Jan Šebek	
1967	The Smooth Career	Stefan	
1967	Hotel for Strangers	Narrator (voice)	
1967	The Valley of the Bees	Armin	
1967	The End of Agent W4C	Agent W4C	
1985	Albert	Count Delesov	
