= All Is Possible in Granada =

All Is Possible in Granada refers to:

- All Is Possible in Granada (1954 film), Spanish film
- All Is Possible in Granada (1982 film), remake of the 1954 film
