= Chendru Ram Mandavi =

Chendru Ram Mandavi (c. 1935 – 18 September 2013), popularly known as the "Tiger Boy" or "Bastar's Mowgli", was an Indian tribal man from the Bastar region of Chhattisgarh. He gained fame during the late 1950s due to his unusual childhood friendship with an orphaned Bengal tiger cub named Tendru (also referred to as Tembu). His story inspired the 1957 Swedish documentary film En djungelsaga directed by Arne Sucksdorff, as well as a book authored by his wife Astrid Bergman Sucksdorff.

== Biography ==
Mandavi was born into the Muria tribe (a subgroup of the Gondi people) in Garh Bengal village, now located in the Narayanpur district of the Bastar division in Chhattisgarh, India. During his childhood, his grandfather brought an orphaned Bengal tiger cub from the forests in a bamboo basket. He adopted the cub and named him Tendru (also referred to as Tembu). The two formed an unusual companionship, spending their days playing together, sharing meals, roaming the local forests, and swimming in nearby rivers.

In the mid-1950s, Swedish director Arne Sucksdorff learned about Chendru's relationship with the tiger. Sucksdorff traveled to Bastar and spent between one and two years filming Chendru and Tendru in their native environment, casting Chendru as the film's main protagonist. The 75 minute documentary film En djungelsaga (known in English as The Flute and the Arrow or A Jungle Tale) was released in 1957 and became critically acclaimed. Arne Sucksdorff's wife and photographer Astrid Bergman Sucksdorff published a book Chendru får en tiger (1959) which was translated into English by British novelist William Sansom as Chendru: The Boy and the Tiger. Following the release of the film, Arne Sucksdorff took Chendru to Sweden, where he lived with the Sucksdorff family for nearly a year and experienced widespread public media coverage.

Shortly after Chendru returned to his village, his tiger Tendru died. In his later years, he suffered a paralytic stroke and experienced prolonged illness. He died on 18 September 2013 at the age of 78 in his village.

== Memorials ==
A statue depicting Chendru alongside his tiger Tendru was erected at the Jungle Safari in Raipur, and a public park was named after him in Narayanpur. In 2023, a statue was erected at New Bus Stand Chowk in Garh Bengal.
