= 1954 Cannes Film Festival =

- Official poster of the 7th Cannes Film Festival, an original illustration by Piva.
- Opening film: Le Grand Jeu
- Location: Cannes, France
- Founded: 1946
- Awards: Grand Prix: Gate of Hell
- No. of films: 43 (In Competition)
- Festival date: 25 March 1954 – 9 April 1954
- Website: festival-cannes.com/en

Cannes Film Festival
- 1955 1953

The 7th Cannes Film Festival took place from 25 March to 9 April 1954. French writer and filmmaker Jean Cocteau served as jury president for the main competition. This was the last festival with a predominantly French jury.

The Grand Prix was awarded, as the highest prize of the Festival, to Gate of Hell by Teinosuke Kinugasa.

As the festival was becoming more and more a pole of showbiz attraction, scandals and romances of stars were appearing in the press. In 1954, the Simone Silva affair during the Cannes Festival ended up in the destruction of her career as an actress and her premature death, three years later.

The festival opened with Flesh and the Woman by Robert Siodmak.

== Juries ==
=== Main Competition ===
- Jean Cocteau, French writer and filmmaker - Jury President
- Jean Aurenche, French writer
- André Bazin, French film critic
- Luis Buñuel, Spanish filmmaker
- Henri Calef, French fimmaker
- Guy Desson, French MP official
- Philippe Erlanger, French
- Michel Fourre-Cormeray, French
- Jacques-Pierre Frogerais, French CNC official
- Jacques Ibert, French composer
- Georges Lamousse, French Senate official
- André Lang, French
- Noël-Noël, French actor
- Georges Raguis, French union official

=== Short Films Competition ===
- Henning Jensen, Danish filmmaker, actor and editor
- Albert Lamorisse, French filmmaker
- Jean Queval, French journalist
- Jean Tedesco, French filmmaker
- Jean Vivie, French CST official

== Official Sections ==
=== In Competition ===
The following feature films competed for the Grand Prix:

English title	Original title	Director(s)	Production country
Adventures of the Barber of Seville	Aventuras del barbero de Sevilla	Ladislao Vajda	France, Spain
All Is Possible in Granada	Todo es posible en Granada	Carlos Blanco and José Luis Sáenz de Heredia	Spain
As Long as You're Near Me	Solange Du da bist	Harald Braun	West Germany
Before the Deluge	Avant le déluge	André Cayatte	France, Italy
Beneath the 12-Mile Reef		Robert D. Webb	United States
The Blazing Sun	صراع في الوادي	Youssef Chahine	Egypt
The Boy and the Fog	El Niño y la niebla	Roberto Gavaldón	Mexico
Bread of Love	Kärlekens bröd	Arne Mattsson	Sweden
Chronicle of Poor Lovers	Cronache di poveri amanti	Carlo Lizzani	Italy
Circus Fandango	Cirkus Fandango	Arne Skouen	Norway
Comedians	Cómicos	Juan Antonio Bardem	Spain
Five Boys from Barska Street	Piatka z ulicy Barskiej	Aleksander Ford	Poland
Flesh and the Woman	Le Grand Jeu	Robert Siodmak	France, Italy
From Here to Eternity		Fred Zinnemann	United States
Gate of Hell	地獄門	Teinosuke Kinugasa	Japan
The Great Adventure	Det Stora Ädventyret	Arne Sucksdorff	Sweden
The Great Warrior Skanderbeg	Великий воин Албании Скандербег	Sergei Yutkevich	Soviet Union, Albania
An Inlet of Muddy Water	にごりえ	Tadashi Imai	Japan
The Kidnappers		Philip Leacock	United Kingdom
Kiskrajcár		Márton Keleti	Hungary
Knave of Hearts	Monsieur Ripois	René Clément	France, United Kingdom
Knights of the Round Table		Richard Thorpe	United Kingdom
Komedianti		Vladimír Vlcek	Czechoslovakia
The Last Bridge	Die Letzte Brücke	Helmut Käutner	Austria, Yugoslavia
Little Boy Lost		George Seaton	United States
The Living Desert		James Algar	United States
Love in a Hot Climate	Sang et lumières	Georges Rouquier and Ricardo Muñoz Suay	France, Spain
Love Letter	恋文	Kinuyo Tanaka	Japan
Maddalena		Augusto Genina	France, Italy
Man of Africa		Cyril Frankel	United Kingdom
Marina's Destiny	Судьба Марины	Isaak Shmaruk and Viktor Ivchenko	Soviet Union
The Martyr of Calvary	El Mártir del Calvario	Miguel Morayta	Mexico
Mayurpankh		Kishore Sahu	India
Memories of a Mexican	Memorias de un Mexicano	Carmen Toscano	Mexico
The Monster	الوحش	Salah Abu Seif	Egypt
Naked Amazon	Feitiço do Amazonas	Zygmunt Sulistrowski	Brazil
Neapolitan Carousel	Carosello napoletano	Ettore Giannini	Italy
Pamposh		Ezra Mir	India
Si mis campos hablaran		José Bohr	Chile
Song of the Sea	O Canto do Mar	Alberto Cavalcanti	Brazil
Stars of the Russian Ballet	Мастера русского балета	Herbert Rappaport	Soviet Union
Two Acres of Land	Do Bigha Zamin	Bimal Roy	India
Windfall in Athens	Κυριακάτικο Ξύπνημα	Michael Cacoyannis	Greece

=== Short Films Competition ===
The following short films competed for the Short Film Palme d'Or:

- Apollon kai Dafni by Thanassis Meritzis
- Aptenodytes forsteri (Les Pingouins) by Mario Marret
- Aquarium by Ágoston Kollányi
- The Blakes Slept Here by Jacques Bernard Brunius
- Christophe Plantin, imprimeur des humanistes du XVIeme siècle by Gaston Vermaillen
- Der dom zu Koeln by Ulrich Kayser
- El Greco en su obra maestra : El entierro del Conde Orgaz by Juan Serra
- Er is altijd een tockomst by Kees Stip
- Exploratieboren by Bert Haanstra
- Feminine Fashions by Mohan Dayaram Bhavnani
- Il fiume della vita by Enrico Castelli Gattinara
- Folk Dances of India by Mohan Dayaram Bhavnani
- Det gjelder livet by Titus Vibe Müller
- Una goccia d'acqua by Enzo Trovasilli
- Highlands of Iceland by Magnus Johannsson
- Hokusai by Hiroshi Teshigahara
- Jaktflygare by Helge Sahlin
- Jyske kyst by Søren Melson
- Kék vércsék erdejében by István Homoki-Nagy
- Koziołeczek by Lechosław Marszałek
- Kutna hora by Fr. Lukas
- Land of Enlightment by Mohan Wadhwani
- Den lille pige med svovlstikkerne by Johan Jacobsen
- Lumière by P. Paviot
- Miniatury kodesku behema by Stanisław Lenartowicz
- Le mystère de la Licorne by Arcady, Jean-Claude See
- Nouveaux horizons by Marcel Ichac
- Nytt land under svillene by Per Opsahl
- O kohoutkovi a slepičce by Zdenec Miler
- A Drop Too Much (O sklenicku víc) by Bretislav Pojar
- L'Ombre de St Michel by Jean Pichonnier, Paul Pichonnier
- De Opsporing van Aardolie by Bert Haanstra
- The Owl and the Pussy Cat by Brian Borthwick, John Halas
- Pik droujby by I. Goutman
- Plastik im Freien by Adalbert Baltes
- The Pleasure Garden by James Broughton
- Polyot na lunu by Vladimir Brumberg, Zinaida Brumberg
- Promenade au Luxembourg by Philippe Schneider
- Rene Leriche chirurgien de la douleur by René Lucot
- River of Hope by Mohan Dayaram Bhavnani
- Ruban noir by Henry Jacques
- El solitario de Sayan by Enrico Gras
- Stare miasto (The Old Town of Warsaw) by Jerzy Bossak
- Stern von Bethlehem by Wilhelm Döderlein
- Toot, Whistle, Plunk and Boom by Ward Kimball, Charles A. Nichols
- Uspavana ljepotica by Rudolf Sremec
- La vie des Chamois by André Bureau, Paul Claudon, P. Dalli, Pierre Levent, André Villard
- Vieren maar by Herman van der Horst
- Viragos kalocsa by Vince Lakatos
- Vita della libellula by Alberto Ancillotto
- Wild Life Sanctuary by D.D. Reucassel

== Official Awards ==
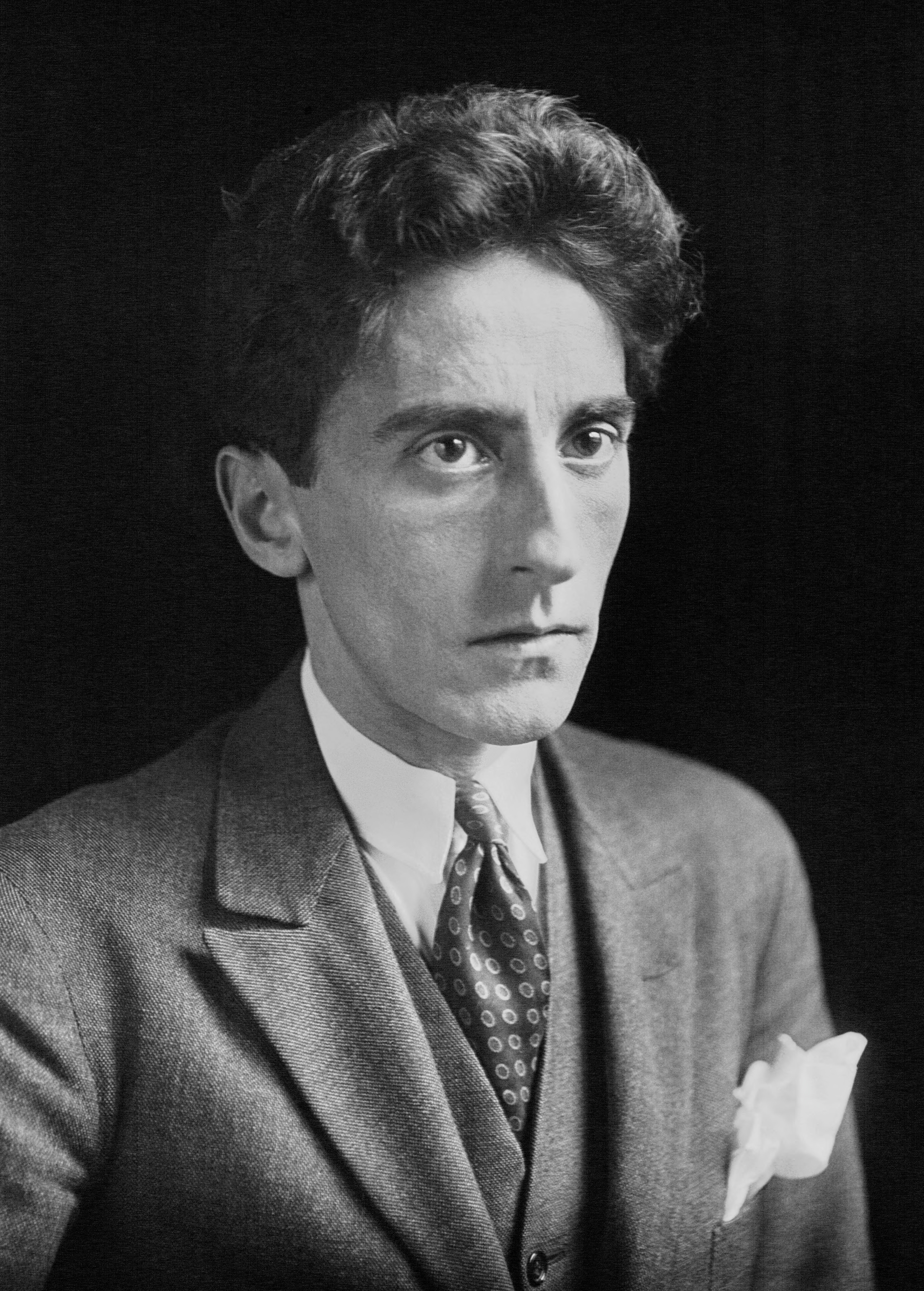
Jean Cocteau, Jury President

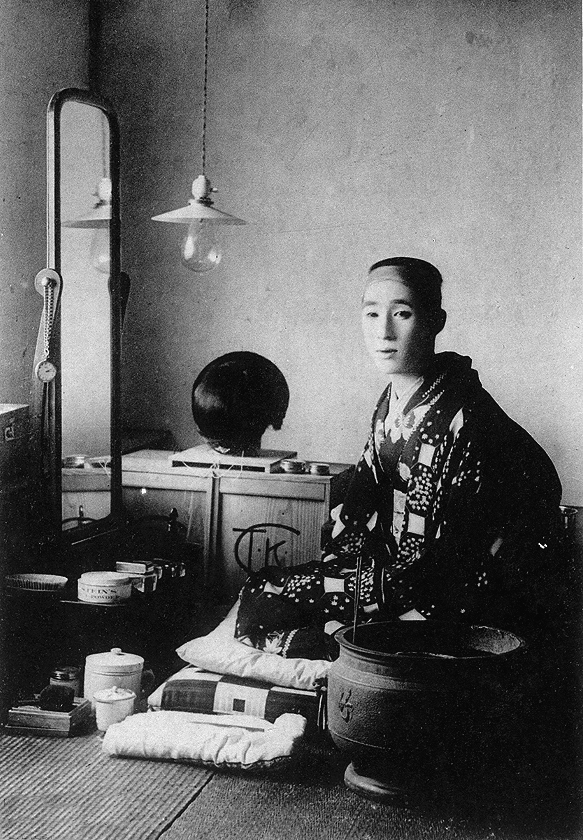
Teinosuke Kinugasa, Grand Prix winner

=== Main Competition ===
- Grand Prix: Gate of Hell by Teinosuke Kinugasa
- International Prize
  - Before the Deluge by André Cayatte
  - Neapolitan Carousel by Ettore Giannini
  - Chronicle of Poor Lovers by Carlo Lizzani
  - Two Acres of Land by Bimal Roy
  - Five Boys from Barska Street by Aleksander Ford
  - The Last Bridge by Helmut Käutner
  - The Living Desert by James Algar
  - The Great Adventure by Arne Sucksdorff
  - The Great Warrior Skanderbeg by Sergei Yutkevich
- Jury Special Prize: Knave of Hearts by René Clément
- Special Mention:
  - André Cayatte and Charles Spaak for Before the Deluge
  - Maria Schell for her performance in The Last Bridge
  - The camera crew of The Living Desert
  - Aleksander Ford for Five Boys from Barska Street
  - Arne Sucksdorff for The Great Adventure
  - Sergei Yutkevich for The Great Warrior Skanderbeg

== Independent Awards ==
=== FIPRESCI Prize ===
- Before the Deluge by André Cayatte

=== OCIC Award ===
- The Last Bridge by Helmut Käutner

== Media ==
- Institut National de l'Audiovisuel: Opening of the 1954 Festival (Michèle Morgan and Robert Mitchum, commentary in French)
- INA: Opening of the 1954 Festival (Daniel Gélin and Gina Lollobrigida, commentary in French)
