= List of Brazilian films of 2007 =

A list of films produced in Brazil in 2007 (see 2007 in film):

== 2007 ==
Title	Director	Cast	Genre	Notes
Os 12 Trabalhos	Ricardo Elias	Sidney Santiago		
3 Efes	Carlos Gerbase	Cris Kessler, Carla Cassapo, Ana Maria Mainieri	Drama	
5 Frações de uma Quase História	Armando Mendz, Cristiano Abud, Cris Azzi, Guilherme Fiúza, Lucas Gontijo, Thales Bahia	Jece Valadão, Luiz Arthur, Claudio Jaborandy, Cynthia Falabella, Leonardo Medeiros	Drama	Six segments film
Ainda Orangotangos	Gustavo Spolidoro		Comedy drama	
Alice's House	Chico Teixeira	Carla Ribas	Drama	
Amigos de Risco	Daniel Bandeira	Ênio Borba, Fleurange Santos, Hissa Hazin Irandhir Santos	Drama	
Caixa Dois	Bruno Barreto	Giovana Antonelli, Fúlvio Stefanini, Cássio Gabus Mendes, Daniel Dantas, Zezé Polessa, Thiago Fragoso	Comedy	
Cão sem Dono	Beto Brant, Renato Ciasca	Júlio Andrade, Tainá Müller	Drama	
Cartola - Música Para os Olhos	Lírio Ferreira, Hilton Lacerda		Documentary	
City of Men	Paulo Morelli	Douglas Silva, Darlan Cunha, Jonathan Haagensen, Rodrigo dos Santos	Drama	
Conceição: Autor Bom é Autor Morto	Daniel Caetano, Samantha Ribeiro, Andre Sampaio, Guilherme Sarmiento, Cynthia Sims	Augusto Madeira, Dado Amaral, Jards Macalé, Thelmo Fernandes	Comedy drama	
Cousin Bazilio		Fábio Assunção	Drama	
Elite Squad	José Padilha	Wagner Moura	Action/crime drama	2008 Golden Berlin Bear Winner
Estômago	Marcos Jorge	João Miguel, Fabiula Nascimento, Babu Santana	Comedy drama	
Fabricando Tom Zé	Décio Matos Jr.		Documentary	
Forbidden to Forbid	Jorge Durán	Caio Blat, Maria Flor, Alexandre Rodrigues	Drama	
A Grande Família - O Filme	Maurício Farias	Marco Nanini, Marieta Severo, Pedro Cardoso	Comedy	
O Homem Que Desafiou o Diabo	Moacyr Góes	Marcos Palmeira, Lívia Falcão, Fernanda Paes Leme, Flávia Alessandra	Comedy	
Inesquecível	Paulo Sérgio Almeida	Murilo Benício, Caco Ciocler, Guilhermina Guinle	Drama	
Jogo de Cena	Eduardo Coutinho	Marília Pêra, Andrea Beltrão, Fernanda Torres	Documentary	
Maré, Nossa História de Amor	Lúcia Murat	Marisa Orth, Cristina Lago, Vinícius D'Black	Drama, musical	
Maria Bethânia - Pedrinha de Aruanda	Andrucha Waddington	Maria Bethânia, Caetano Veloso	Documentary	
Memória do Movimento Estudantil	Silvio Tendler	Chico Díaz, Cássio Gabus Mendes, Amir Haddad	Documentary	
Meteoro	Diego de la Texera	Paula Burlamaqui, Daisy Granados, Cláudio Marzo	Drama	Co-production with Puerto Rico and Venezuela
Noel - Poeta da Vila	Ricardo Van Steen	Rafael Raposo, Camila Pitanga	Drama	
Not by Chance	Philippe Barcinski, Leonardo Medeiros, Letícia Sabatella	Rodrigo Santoro	Drama	
O Mundo Em Duas Voltas	David Schurmann	Heloisa Schurmann, Kat Schurmann, Vilfredo Schurmann	Documentary	
Ó Paí, Ó	Monique Gardenberg	Lázaro Ramos, Wagner Moura, Dira Paes	Comedy, musical	
Pequenas Histórias	Helvécio Ratton	Gero Camilo, Paulo José, Patricia Pillar, Marieta Severo	Family	
Podecrer!	Arthur Fontes	Dudu Azevedo, Maria Flor, Erika Mader, Fernanda Paes Leme	Drama	
Querô	Carlos Cortez	Maxwell Nascimento, Ailton Graça, Milhem Cortaz, Maria Luisa Mendonça, Ângela Leal	Drama	
Saneamento Básico	Jorge Furtado	Fernanda Torres, Wagner Moura, Lázaro Ramos	Comedy	
Santiago	João Moreira Salles		Documentary	
Sem Controle	Cris D'Amato	Eduardo Moscovis, Milena Toscano	Drama	
The Sign of the City	Carlos Alberto Riccelli	Bruna Lombardi, Juca de Oliveira, Malvino Salvador, Graziella Moreto, Luiz Miranda, Denise Fraga, Eva Vilma	Drama	
Uma Aventura no Tempo	Maurício de Souza	Marli Bortoletto, Angélica Santos, Paulo Camargo, Elza Gonçalves, Rodrigo Andreatto	Animation	
Valsa para Bruno Stein	Paulo Nascimento	Walmor Chagas, Araci Esteves, Fernanda Moro, Ingra Liberato	Drama	
Xuxa em Sonho de Menina	Rudi Lagemann	Xuxa, Carlos Casagrande	Family	

== See also ==
- 2007 in Brazil
- 2007 in Brazilian television
- List of 2007 box office number-one films in Brazil
