= Dirce Migliaccio =

Brazilian actress (1933–2009)

- Born: 30 September 1933; São Paulo, Brazil
- Died: 22 September 2009 (aged 75); Rio de Janeiro, Brazil
- Occupation: Actress
- Years active: 1958–2008
- Known for: Emília; In Sítio do Picapau Amarelo
- Spouse: Lio Dias (1964-197?)
- Parent(s): Domingos Migliaccio; Jandira Migliaccio
- Relatives: Flávio Migliaccio (brother); Marcelo Migliaccio (nephew)

Dirce Migliaccio (30 September 1933 – 22 September 2009) was a Brazilian actress and sister of actor Flávio Migliaccio. Her films include My Home Is Copacabana and She also portraying the character Emília in Sítio do Picapau Amarelo in 1977.

== Filmography ==
=== Film ===
- 1962: O Assalto ao Trem Pagador - Edgar's Wife
- 1962: Pluft, o Fantasminha - Pluft
- 1963: The Beggars
- 1965: Mitt hem är Copacabana
- 1966: Cuidado, Espião Brasileiro em Ação
- 1974: Conjugal Warfare - Laura
- 1975: O Roubo das Calcinhas - Filó - Segment 2 - Manuel's wife
- 1975: O Caçador Fantasma
- 1975: Nem Os Bruxos Escapam
- 1976: Padre Cícero
- 1986: Baixo Gávea - Clara's mother
- 1998: Simão, o Fantasma Trapalhão - Srª. Dolsty (Dona Ghost)
- 2000: Célia e Rosita (Short)
- 2001: Bufo & Spallanzani - Dona Bernarda
- 2007: Sem Controle - Dona Iolanda
- 2007: Xuxa em Sonho de Menina - Vozinha

=== Television ===
- 1977: Sítio do Picapau Amarelo - Emília
- 2004: Da Cor do Pecado - Zazi
- 2006: Sítio do Picapau Amarelo - Valdo's mother
