= Baltes =

Baltes is a German language surname. It stems from the male given name Balthasar – and may refer to:

- Adalbert Baltes (1916–1992), German inventor
- Benjamin Baltes (1984), German footballer
- Hansjörg Baltes (1964), German speed skater
- Heiner Baltes (1949), German footballer
- Paul Baltes (1939–2006), German psychologist
- Peter Baltes (1958), German rock musician
- Peter Joseph Baltes (1827–1886), German-born American prelate
