= Listed buildings in Värmland County =

There are 64 listed buildings (Swedish: byggnadsminne) in Värmland County.

== Arvika Municipality ==
Image	Name	Premises	Number of buildings	Year built	Architect	Coordinates	ID
	Oppstuhage	Oppstuhaget 7 previously Taserud 2:24	3			59.67075°N 12.61290°E	21300000013776
	Övre Stortorpet, Långvak	Långvak 3:118	1			59.66703°N 12.66202°E	21300000013774
	Sölje herrgård	Sölje 3:4 previously Sölje 3:1	1			59.48777°N 12.69562°E	21300000013897
	Älgå smedja	Älgå Stom 1:21 previously Älgå Stom 1:1	1			59.64347°N 12.47409°E	21300000013898

== Filipstad Municipality ==
Image	Name	Premises	Number of buildings	Year built	Architect	Coordinates	ID
	Långbans hytta Herrgård	Långbanshyttan 1:230 previously Långbanshyttan 1:186, 1:204	17			59.85467°N 14.26170°E	21300000013799
	Bergmästaregården, Filipstad	Bergmästaren 1	4			59.71017°N 14.17180°E	21300000013964
	Brattforshyttan	Brattforshyttan 3:1	2			59.66657°N 14.02129°E	21300000013787
	Filipstads kvarn	Kvarnen 1	1			59.71222°N 14.16072°E	21300000013980
	Kärns gård	Gräsbosjön 1:9	10			59.83249°N 13.93005°E	21300000013798
	Motjärnshyttan	Motjärnshyttan 1:19 previously Järnshyttan 1:1	1			59.92789°N 13.97705°E	21300000013899
	Nedre Kallsteniigården	Bryggaren 1	4			59.71116°N 14.16993°E	21300000013797
	Rämmens herrgård	Rämmen 1:163	8			60.02610°N 14.10986°E	21300000013901
	Storbrohyttan	Storbrohyttan 2:30	2			59.72029°N 14.15617°E	21300000013800

== Grums Municipality ==
Image	Name	Premises	Number of buildings	Year built	Architect	Coordinates	ID
	Borgviks herrgård	Borgviksbruk 1:82, 1:98, 1:99 previously Borgviksbruk 1:1	5			59.35197°N 12.96109°E	21300000013781

== Hagfors Municipality ==
Image	Name	Premises	Number of buildings	Year built	Architect	Coordinates	ID
	Bessemerverket i Hagfors	Hagfors 2:61	1			60.03150°N 13.69015°E	21300000013806
	Uddeholms herrgård	Uddeholm 18:22 previously Uddeholm 18:1	5			60.01760°N 13.61875°E	21300000013805

== Karlstad Municipality ==
Image	Name	Premises	Number of buildings	Year built	Architect	Coordinates	ID
	Geijerska gården, Karlstad	Almen 15	3			59.38000°N 13.49534°E	21300000013951
	Kvarteret Ugglan 6, Karlstad	Ugglan 6	1			59.38161°N 13.49579°E	21300000013855
		Ugglan 5	1			59.38163°N 13.49636°E	21300000013854
	Alsters herrgård	Alsters herrgård 2:1	4			59.39844°N 13.60246°E	21300000013843
	Biskopsgården, Karlstad	Udden 1	3			59.38303°N 13.50125°E	21300000013808
	Expositionshuset, Karlstad	Styrmannen 3 tidigare Vänershov 10	1			59.37679°N 13.50379°E	21300000013859
	Frimurarelogen, Karlstad	Mercurius 4	1			59.38021°N 13.50225°E	21300000013959
	Gamla gymnasiet, Karlstad	Falken 7	1			59.38086°N 13.50678°E	21300000019238
	Grevgården, Karlstad	Gäddan 15 previously Kv Gäddan 9	1			59.38027°N 13.49292°E	21300000013826
	Hammars säteri	Hammar 1:31	3			59.38044°N 13.80994°E	21300000013902
	Hypoteksföreningen, Karlstad	Björnen 5	1			59.38017°N 13.49892°E	21300000013813
	Höglunda herrgård	Höglunda 1:311 previously 1:51	1			59.42910°N 13.23751°E	21300000013867
	Karlstads centralstation	Järnvägen 1:1	1			59.37799°N 13.49910°E	21300000013939
	Karlstads teater	Teatern 1 previously Klara 1:2	1			59.38206°N 13.49730°E	21300000013833
	Ve kronofogdegård	Västra Ve 1:5	4			59.41835°N 13.82693°E	21300000013906
	Landshövdingegården; Doktorsgården	Almen 19	3			59.38008°N 13.49640°E	21300000013946
	Nors prästgård	Nor 1:10	1			59.41227°N 13.23692°E	21300000013868
	Pihlgrensgården	Gäddan 12	2			59.38006°N 13.49451°E	21300000013829
	Sandbäckens gård	Sandbäcken 1:9	5			59.38680°N 13.49544°E	21300000013832
	Tingvallagymnasiet	Falken 8	1			59.38077°N 13.50532°E	21300000013815
	Värmlands museum	Cyrillus 1 previously Tingvallastaden 1:1; Stg 1413	1			59.38530°N 13.50028°E	21300000013952
	Väse prästgård	Väse prästgård 1:8 previously Väse prästgård 1:1	3			59.40973°N 13.84808°E	21300000013904
	Wermlandsbanken	Mercurius 14	1			59.38003°N 13.50318°E	21300000013831
	Älvsbacka missionshus	Stenåsen 1:14	1			59.71083°N 13.67966°E	21300000013907

== Kil Municipality ==
Image	Name	Premises	Number of buildings	Year built	Architect	Coordinates	ID
	Apertins herrgård	Apertin 3:3 previously Apertin 3:2	6			59.51740°N 13.36797°E	21300000013909
	Fryksta järnvägsstation	Halsmo 1:33	1			59.52721°N 13.33123°E	21300000013926

== Kristinehamn Municipality ==
Image	Name	Premises	Number of buildings	Year built	Architect	Coordinates	ID
	Kristinehamns stadshotell	Tellus 1	1			59.31004°N 14.10895°E	21300000013864
	Krontorps herrgård	Krontorp 1:5	3			59.16718°N 14.19932°E	21300000013910
	Nordenfeldtska gården	Nebulosan 8	1			59.31064°N 14.10363°E	21300000013861
	Värmlands Säby herrgård	Säby 1:6	5			59.09169°N 14.14767°E	21300000013911
	Wahlundska gården	Vågen 3	5			59.30975°N 14.10514°E	21300000013865
	Gustafsviks mejeri, Österviks kapell	Östervik 1:8-9	4			59.35136°N 14.07272°E	21300000013912

== Munkfors Municipality ==
Image	Name	Premises	Number of buildings	Year built	Architect	Coordinates	ID
	Ransäters bruksgård	Geijersgården 2:1	3			59.76632°N 13.44178°E	21300000013913
	Munkfors herrgård, Martinverk	Heden 1:44, 1:6 previously stg 1164–1165	6			59.84623°N 13.54384°E	21300000013984

== Storfors Municipality ==
Image	Name	Premises	Number of buildings	Year built	Architect	Coordinates	ID
	Alkvetterns herrgård	Alkvettern 2:93 previously Alkvettern 2:1	8			59.44101°N 14.41130°E	21300000013778

== Sunne Municipality ==
Image	Name	Premises	Number of buildings	Year built	Architect	Coordinates	ID
	Mårbacka	Mårbacka 1:4	1			59.78093°N 13.23313°E	21300000013914

== Säffle Municipality ==
Image	Name	Premises	Number of buildings	Year built	Architect	Coordinates	ID
	Björnö gård	Björnö 1:8 previously Björnö 1:1	3			59.39555°N 12.84509°E	21300000013801
	Karl XII-magasinet	Säffle 6:18	1			59.12036°N 12.91807°E	21300000013916
	Nysäters marknadsbodar	Nysäter 1:1, 1:9	4			59.28320°N 12.77784°E	21300000013802
	Odenstad herrgård	Odenstad 1:2 previously Odenstad 1:1	1			59.33345°N 12.79621°E	21300000013804
	Von Echstedtska gården	Västra Smedbyn 1:14	7			59.22793°N 12.73178°E	21300000019254

== Torsby Municipality ==
Image	Name	Premises	Number of buildings	Year built	Architect	Coordinates	ID
	Gravols soldattorp	S:2 previously Gravol 1:13 m fl	4			60.33218°N 13.36954°E	21300000013917
	Halvarsgården	Båtstad 1:121	1			60.88476°N 12.64750°E	21300000013918
	Röjdåfors kvarn	Röjdoset 1:40	2			60.39147°N 12.64021°E	21300000013920
	Johula finngård	Multtjärn 1:9	9			60.4189°N 12.7188°E	21300000013919
	Kvarntorps finngård	Södra Lekvattnet 1:23	15			60.1265°N 12.5884°E	21300000013968
	Ritamäki finngård	Södra Lekvattnet 1:87	7			60.1489°N 12.5413°E	21300000013866

== Årjäng Municipality ==
Image	Name	Premises	Number of buildings	Year built	Architect	Coordinates	ID
	Holmedals prästgård	Holmedals prästgård 1:13, 1:56 previously Holmedals prästgård 1:2	2			59.47221°N 11.95763°E	21300000013807
	Långelanda tingshus	Långelanda 1:69; Långemåla 1:69	3			59.44175°N 12.14378°E	21300000013974
	Ögården, Dusserud	Dusserud 1:18	8			59.47454°N 11.88303°E	21300000013970
