= Naked Amazon =

1954 film

- Directed by: Zygmunt Sulistrowski
- Written by: Richard Olizar
- Starring: Andrea Bayard
- Cinematography: Richard Olizar
- Edited by: Monique Jaubert Sulistrowski
- Release date: 1954
- Running time: 69m
- Country: Brazil
- Language: Portuguese

Naked Amazon (Portuguese: Feitiço do Amazonas) is a 1954 Brazilian adventure film directed by Zygmunt Sulistrowski. It was entered into the 1954 Cannes Film Festival.

== Cast ==
- Monique Jaubert Sulistrowski
- Andrea Bayard
- Dercy Gonçalves
- Angela Maria
- Jeffrey Mitchell
- Richard Olizar
- José Osorio
