= Flávio Migliaccio =

Brazilian actor (1934–2020)

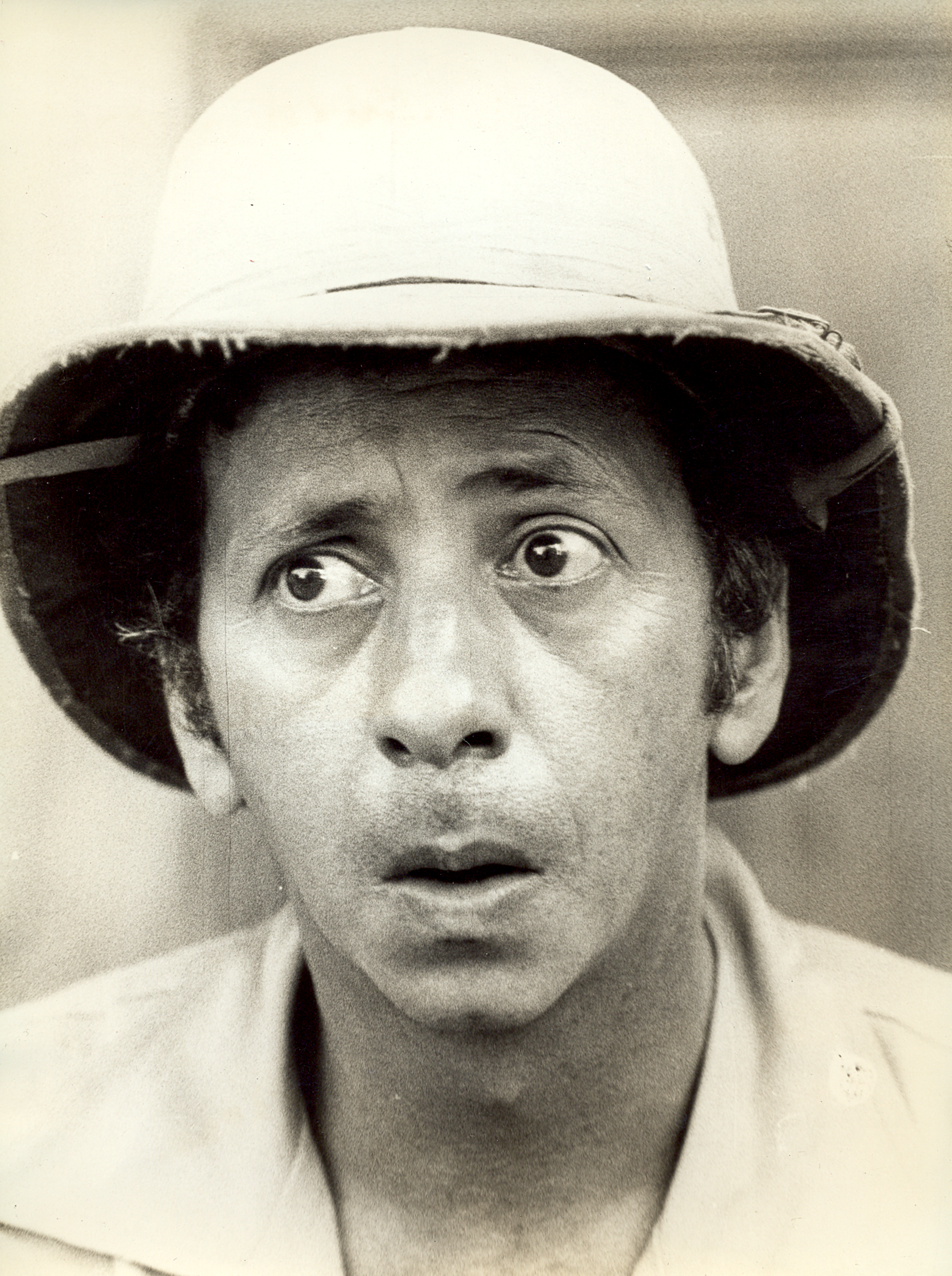
- Migliaccio in 1971
- Born: 26 August 1934; São Paulo, Brazil
- Died: 4 May 2020 (aged 85); Rio Bonito, Rio de Janeiro, Brazil
- Occupations: Actor; film director; screenwriter
- Years active: 1958–2019
- Spouse: Yvonne Migliaccio (m. 1956)
- Children: 1
- Relatives: Dirce Migliaccio (sister)

Flávio Migliaccio (26 August 1934 – 4 May 2020) was a Brazilian actor, film director and screenwriter. He appeared in more than 90 films and television shows between 1958 and 2019. His 1962 film The Beggars was entered into the 3rd Moscow International Film Festival. His elder sister Dirce Migliaccio was also an actress.

Migliaccio was found dead by his property caretaker at his farm in Rio Bonito, Rio de Janeiro, on 4 May 2020, aged 85. According to Military Police of Rio de Janeiro State, he left a suicide note and hanged himself.

== Selected filmography ==
- O Grande Momento (1958)
- Cinco vezes Favela (1962) – João (segment "Um favelado")
- The Beggars (1963)
- My Home Is Copacabana (1965)
- Canalha em Crise (1965)
- The Hour and Turn of Augusto Matraga (1965) – Quim Recadeiro
- Todas as Mulheres do Mundo (1966) – Edu
- Cuidado, Espião Brasileiro em Ação (1966)
- Entranced Earth (1967) – Common people man
- Arrastão (1967)
- O Homem Que Comprou o Mundo (1968) – José Guerra
- O Homem Nu (1968)
- A Penúltima Donzela (1969) – The Priest
- Pobre Príncipe Encantado (1969)
- Máscara da Traição (1969) – Correia
- Como Vai, Vai Bem? (1969)
- A Cama Ao Alcance de Todos (1969) – The Beggar
- O Donzelo (1970) – Nestor
- Quatro Contra o Mundo (1970) – (segment "História da Praia")
- Vida e Glória de um Canalha (1970)
- Uma Garota em Maus Lençóis (1970)
- Parafernália o Dia de Caça (1970)
- Pais Quadrados... Filhos Avançados (1970)
- Em Busca do Su$exo (1970)
- Pra Quem Fica, Tchau (1971) – Chuca
- Roberto Carlos a 300 Quilômetros por Hora (1971) – Luigi
- Os Caras de Pau (1971)
- Como Ganhar na Loteria sem Perder a Esportiva (1971)
- Aventuras com Tio Maneco (1971) – Tio Maneco
- Assalto à Brasileira (1971) – Zeca
- Os Machões (1972) – Chuca
- Um Virgem na Praça (1973) – José
- O Filho do Chefão (1974)
- O Caçador de Fantasma (1975) – Tio Maneco
- Maneco, o Super Tio (1978) – Tio Maneco
- Sítio do Picapau Amarelo (1978) – Ptolomeu
- A Noiva da Cidade (1978)
- Parceiros da Aventura (1980) – Marcelo
- Pra Frente, Brasil (1982)
- Tanga (1987) – Partido Comunista Tanganês
- Rainha da Sucata (1990) – Osvaldo Moreiras (Seu Moreiras)
- A Próxima Vítima (1995, TV Series) – Vitinho Giovanni
- Boleiros - Era uma Vez o Futebol... (1998) – Naldinho
- Menino Maluquinho 2: A Aventura (1998)
- Sítio do Picapau Amarelo (2004–2006) – Iaú / Eremita
- Boleiros 2: Vencedores e Vencidos (2006) – Naldinho
- Os Porralokinhas (2007) – Tio Maneco
- Verônica (2008) – Seu Luís
- Caminho das Índias (2009, TV Series) – Karan Ananda
- The Dognapper (2013) – Seu João
- Êta Mundo Bom! (2016, TV Series) – Josias
- Jovens Polacas (2019) – Mr. Abrahão
- Órfãos da Terra (2019) – Mamede Al Aud
