= The Great Adventure (1953 film) =

1953 film

- Swedish DVD cover
- Directed by: Arne Sucksdorff
- Written by: Arne Sucksdorff
- Produced by: Arne Sucksdorff
- Starring: Gunnar Sjöberg
- Cinematography: Arne Sucksdorff
- Edited by: Arne Sucksdorff
- Release date: 29 September 1953
- Running time: 77 minutes
- Country: Sweden
- Language: Swedish

The Great Adventure (Swedish: Det stora äventyret) is a 1953 Swedish drama film directed by Arne Sucksdorff.

== Cast ==
- Gunnar Sjöberg as Narrator (Anders as an adult) (voice)
- Luis Van Rooten as Narrator (Anders as an adult) (U.S. version) (voice)
- Anders Nohrborg as Anders
- Kjell Sucksdorff as Kjell
- Holger Stockman as KvastasEmil
- Arne Sucksdorff as Father
- Amanda Haglund as Grandmother
- Annika Ekedahl as Annika
- Aina Fritzell as Teacher
- Stina Andersson as Mother
- Erik Bodin as Store Keeper
- Sigvard Kihlgren as Jens
- Norman Shelley as Narrator

== Awards ==
Won

- 4th Berlin International Film Festival: Big Silver Medal (Documentaries and Culture Films)

Nominated

- 1954 Cannes Film Festival: Palme d'Or
