= Félix Dafauce =

Spanish actor (1896–1990)

- Born: 13 November 1896; Madrid, Spain
- Died: 5 October 1990 (aged 93); Madrid, Spain
- Occupation: Actor
- Years active: 1925-1987

Félix Dafauce (13 November 1896 – 5 October 1990) was a Spanish film actor. He appeared in 120 films between 1925 and 1987. He was born and died in Madrid, Spain.

== Selected filmography ==
- When the Angels Sleep (1947)
- Dawn of America (1951)
- Lola the Coalgirl (1952)
- Flight 971 (1953)
- Airport (1953)
- The Seducer of Granada (1953)
- The Devil Plays the Flute (1953)
- I Was a Parish Priest (1953)
- All Is Possible in Granada (1954)
- Rebellion (1954)
- Judas' Kiss (1954)
- The Lost City (1955)
- Afternoon of the Bulls (1956)
- The Legion of Silence (1956)
- The Battalion in the Shadows (1957)
- Night and Dawn (1958)
- Back to the Door (1959)
- Where Are You Going, Alfonso XII? (1959)
- Plácido (1961)
- Rogelia (1962)
- The Secret of the Black Widow (1963)
- Two Mafiamen in the Far West (1964)
- The Complete Idiot (1970)
- All Is Possible in Granada (1982)
- The Autonomines (1984)
