= The Flute and the Arrow =

1957 film

- Film poster
- Directed by: Arne Sucksdorff
- Written by: Arne Sucksdorff
- Produced by: Arne Sucksdorff
- Starring: Chendru
- Cinematography: Arne Sucksdorff
- Music by: Ravi Shankar
- Release date: 1957
- Running time: 75 minutes
- Country: Sweden
- Language: Swedish

The Flute and the Arrow (Swedish: En djungelsaga) is a 1957 Swedish drama film directed by Arne Sucksdorff. It was entered into the 1958 Cannes Film Festival.

== Story ==
The film documents tribal boy Chendru's unusual friendship with Bengal tiger named Tendru whom he adopted as a cub when his grandfather got it for him from the forest.

== Cast ==
- Chendru Ram Mandavi as self, the boy
- Ginjo as self, the hunter
- Riga as self, the hunter's wife
- Tengru Shikari as self, the boy's grandfather
