= Graham Billing =

Novelist, journalist and poet

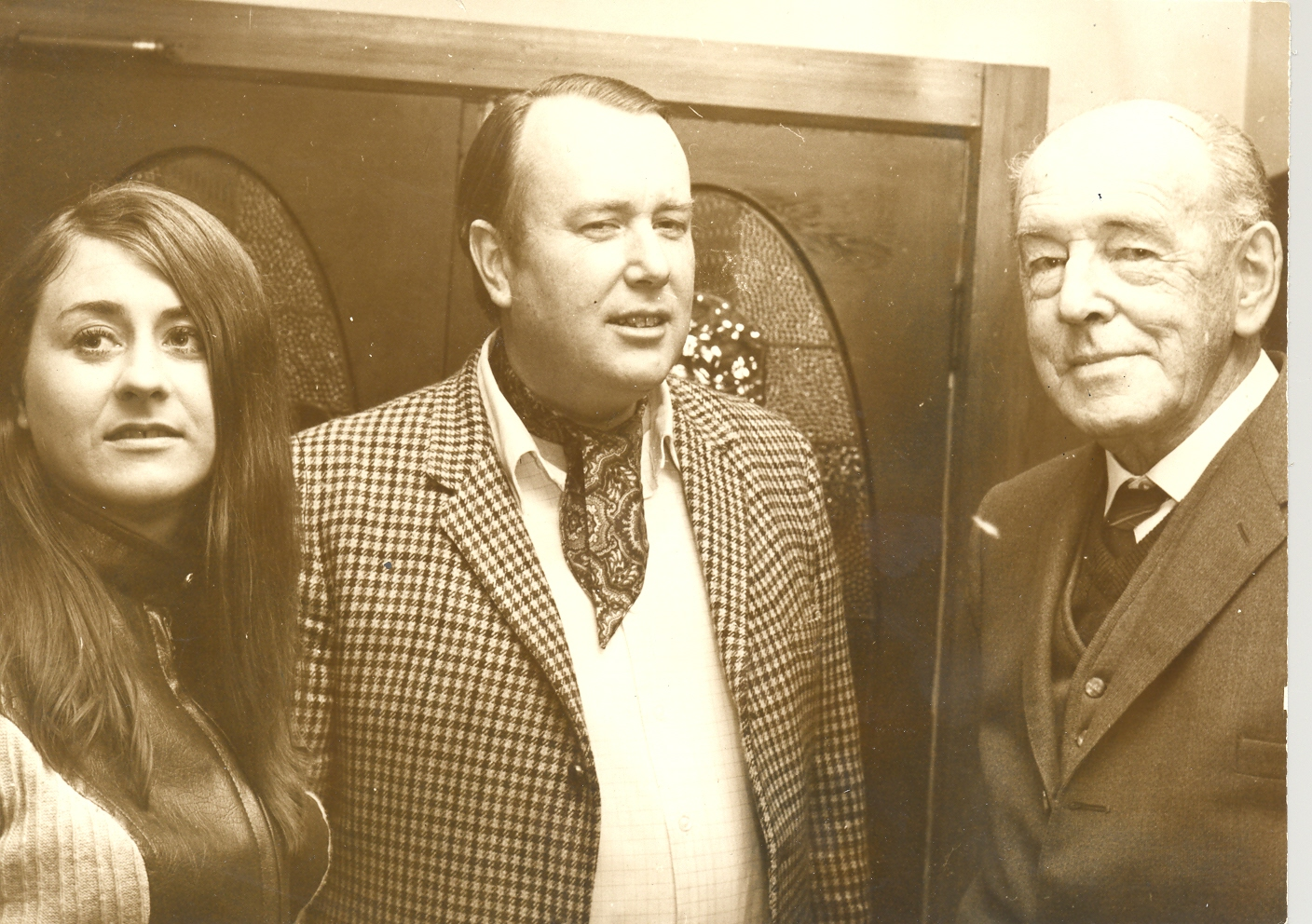
- Billing in 1971, center; Mrs. Billing to the left.
- Born: Graham John Billing; 12 January 1936; Dunedin, New Zealand
- Died: 11 December 2001 (aged 65); Berhampore, Wellington, New Zealand
- Occupations: novelist, poet, journalist

Graham John Billing (12 January 1936 – 11 December 2001) was a New Zealand novelist, journalist and poet. He was born in Dunedin, and educated at the Otago Boys' High School and the University of Otago where his father was professor of economics.

He was a newspaper and radio journalist from 1958 to 1977. He had spent four years working on ships, which is reflected in the novel The Slipway. He was information officer for the New Zealand Antarctic Research Programme from 1962 to 1964, reflected in his first novel Forbush and the Penguins, which was adapted to film in 1971 as Mr. Forbush and the Penguins. Billing was awarded the Robert Burns Fellowship in Dunedin in 1973. The poems in Changing Countries were written after two years teaching in Australia from 1974 to 1975.

An autobiographical element in The Slipway is his struggle with alcoholism. He also wrote three radio plays and the text for three non-fiction works South: Man and Nature in Antarctica (1964), New Zealand: The Sunlit Land (1966) and The New Zealanders (1975, 1979).

== Published works ==
=== Novels ===
- Forbush and the Penguins (A.H. & A.W. Reed, 1965)
- The Alpha Trip (Whitcombe & Tombs, 1969)
- Statues (Hodder and Stoughton, 1971)
- The Slipway (Quartet Books, 1973)
- The Primal Therapy of Tom Purslane (Caveman Press, 1980)
- The Chambered Nautilus (Canterbury University Press, 1993)
- The Lifeboat (Cape Catley, 1997)
- The Blue Lion: An Historical Love Story (Cape Catley, 2002)

=== Poetry ===
- Changing Countries (Caveman Press, 1980)

=== Non-fiction ===
- South: Man and Nature in Antarctica: A New Zealand View (photographs by Guy Mannering, A.H. & A.W. Reed, 1964)
- New Zealand: The Sunlit Land (photographs by R.J. Griffith; A.H. & A.W. Reed, 1966)
- The New Zealanders (photographs by Robin Smith and Warren Jacobs; Golden Press, 1975)
