= All Is Possible in Granada (1982 film) =

- Directed by: Rafael Romero Marchent
- Written by: José Luis Sáenz de Heredia (story); Carlos Blanco (story); Vicente Coello; Rafael Romero Marchent
- Produced by: Alfredo Fraile
- Starring: Manolo Escobar; Tessa Hood; Manolo Gómez Bur
- Cinematography: Domingo Solano
- Edited by: Mercedes Alonso
- Music by: Gregorio García Segura
- Production company: Filmayer
- Distributed by: Filmayer
- Release date: 5 April 1982
- Running time: 95 minutes
- Country: Spain
- Language: Spanish

All Is Possible in Granada (Spanish: Todo es posible en Granada) is a 1982 Spanish musical comedy film directed by Rafael Romero Marchent and starring Manolo Escobar, Tessa Hood and Manolo Gómez Bur. The film's sets were designed by the art director Luis Vázquez. It is a remake of the 1954 film of the same name.

== Cast ==
- Manolo Escobar as Manolo Ortega
- Tessa Hood as Margaret
- Manolo Gómez Bur as José Heredia Jiménez 'Petaca'
- Luis Varela as Roby
- Rafael Alonso as Mr. Taylor
- Luis Barbero as Falsificador
- Félix Dafauce as Mr. Colman
- José Moreno
- Francisco Nieto
- Emilio Fornet as Curro
- Rafael Romero Marchent as Camarero

== Bibliography ==
- José Luis Borau. Palabra de cine: su presencia en nuestro lenguaje. Ediciones Península, 2010.
