= Betty Lago =

Brazilian actress and model (1955–2015)

- Born: Elizabeth Lago Netto; June 24, 1955; Rio de Janeiro, Brazil
- Died: September 13, 2015 (aged 60); Rio de Janeiro, Brazil
- Occupation(s): Actress, model
- Years active: 1976-2015

Elizabeth Lago Netto (June 24, 1955 – September 13, 2015) was a Brazilian actress and model.

Lago was born in Rio de Janeiro. She was married to singer and actor Eduardo Conde for many years.

In 2012, Lago was diagnosed with gallbladder cancer, which spread into her liver. She died from the disease at the age of 60 on September 13, 2015.

== Filmography ==
=== Film ===
- 1976: Dona Flor e seus dois maridos .... Zizi
- 1997: Alô? .... Dora
- 2002: Xuxa e os duendes 2 - No caminho das fadas .... Algaz
- 2005: Mais uma Vez Amor .... Mendonça
- 2007: Xuxa em Sonho de Menina .... Pandora Raquel

=== Television ===
- 1992: Anos Rebeldes .... Natália
- 1993: Sex Appeal .... Vicky
- 1994: Quatro por Quatro .... Abigail
- 1996: Vira-Lata .... Walkíria
- 1997: O Amor Está no Ar .... Sofia
- 1998: Pecado Capital .... Mila
- 2000: Uga-Uga .... Brigitte
- 2002: O Quinto dos Infernos .... Carlota Joaquina de Bourbon e Bragança
- 2004: Kubanacan .... Mercedes
- 2006: Bang Bang .... Calamity Jane
- 2006: A Diarista .... Leda
- 2006: Pé na Jaca .... Morgana Botelho Bulhões
- 2006: A Diarista .... Leda (Special guest)
- 2007: Duas Caras .... Soraya
- 2009: Caminho das Índias .... Herself (Special guest)
- 2009: Cinquentinha .... Rejane Batista
- 2011: Vidas em Jogo .... Marizete Bastos da Silva
- 2013: Pecado Mortal .... Stella Nolasco (final appearance)
