= Ransäter =

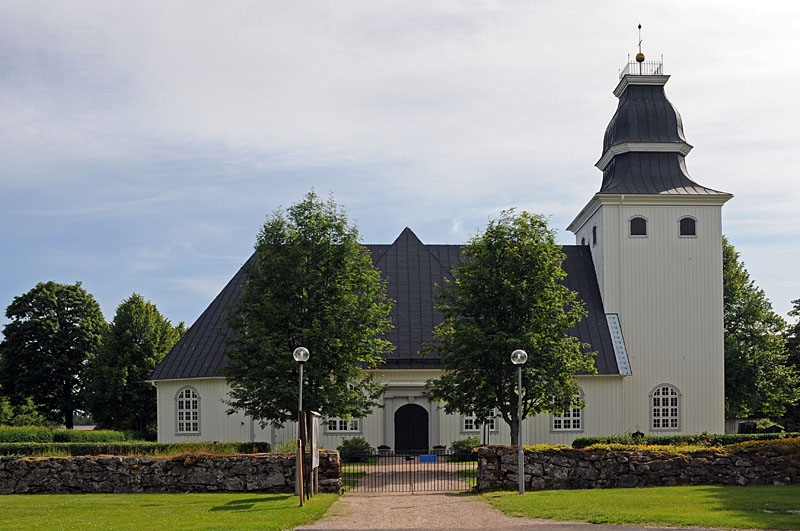
- Ransäter Church

- Location within Värmland County Location within Sweden
- Coordinates: 59°46′N 13°27′E
- Country: Sweden
- Province: Värmland
- County: Värmland County
- Municipality: Munkfors Municipality

Area
  - Total: 0.35 km^{2} (0.14 sq mi)

Population (2023)
  - Total: 103
  - Density: 290/km^{2} (760/sq mi)
- Time zone: UTC+1 (CET)
  - Summer (DST): UTC+2 (CEST)

Ransäter (Swedish pronunciation: [ˈrǎnːsɛtɛr]) is a smaller locality in Munkfors Municipality, Värmland County, Sweden with 103 inhabitants in 2023.

== Notable natives ==
- Erik Gustaf Geijer, writer, historian, poet, philosopher and composer
- Sten Bergman, zoologist and adventurer
- Tage Erlander, politician and statesman, served as the 25th Prime Minister of Sweden
