= Munkfors =

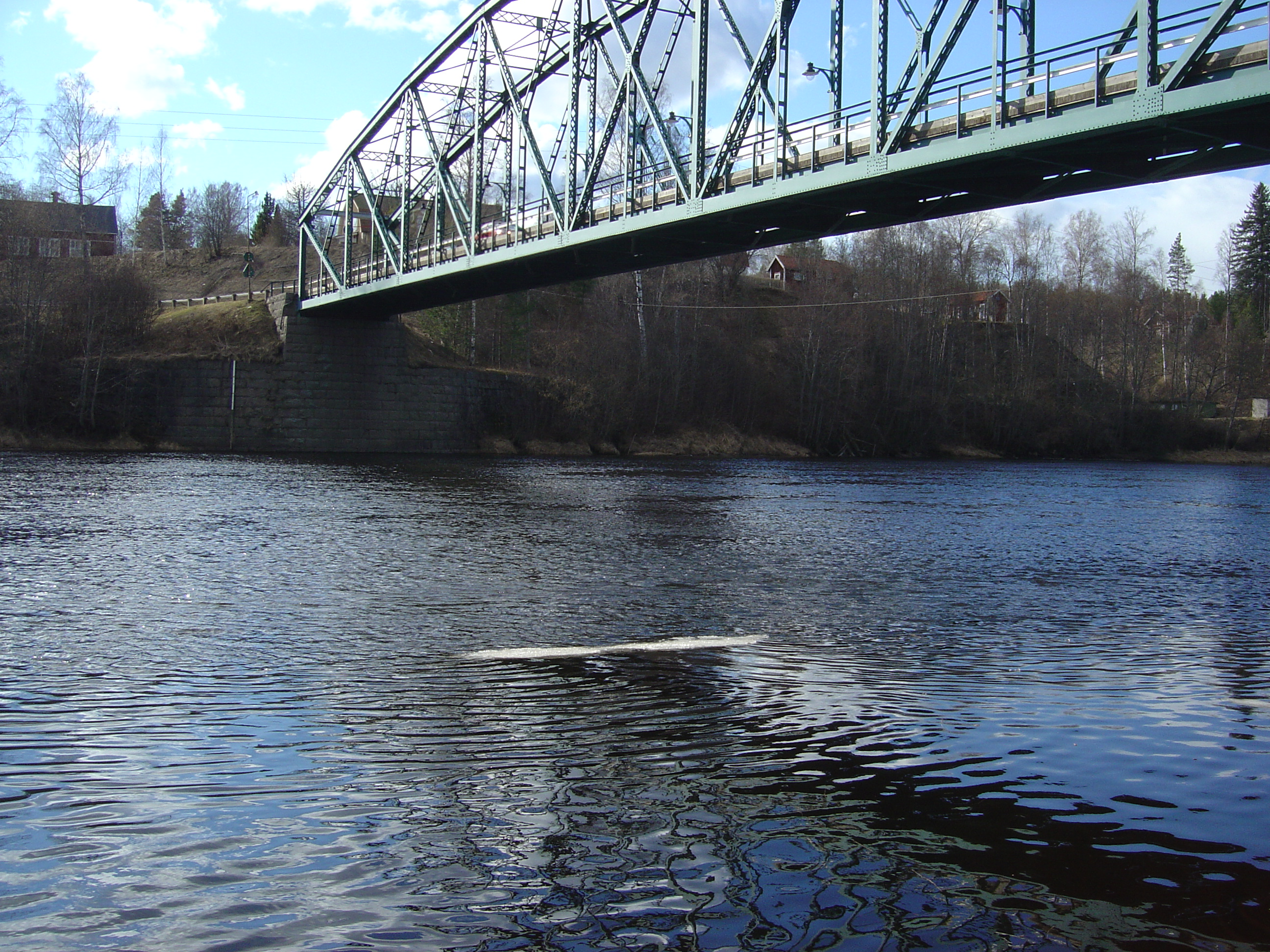
- Klarälven running through Munkfors in April 2006

- Location within Sweden
- Coordinates: 59°50′N 13°32′E
- Country: Sweden
- Province: Värmland
- County: Värmland County
- Municipality: Munkfors Municipality and Hagfors Municipality

Area
  - Total: 7.31 km^{2} (2.82 sq mi)

Population (31 December 2010)
  - Total: 3,054
  - Density: 418/km^{2} (1,080/sq mi)
- Time zone: UTC+1 (CET)
  - Summer (DST): UTC+2 (CEST)
- Climate: Dfb

Munkfors is a bimunicipal locality and the seat of Munkfors Municipality in Värmland County, Sweden with 3,054 inhabitants in 2010. It is also partly located in Hagfors Municipality.

== People ==
- Charlotte Karlinder (born 1975), journalist
