= Sten Bergman =

Swedish biologist, zoologist and explorer

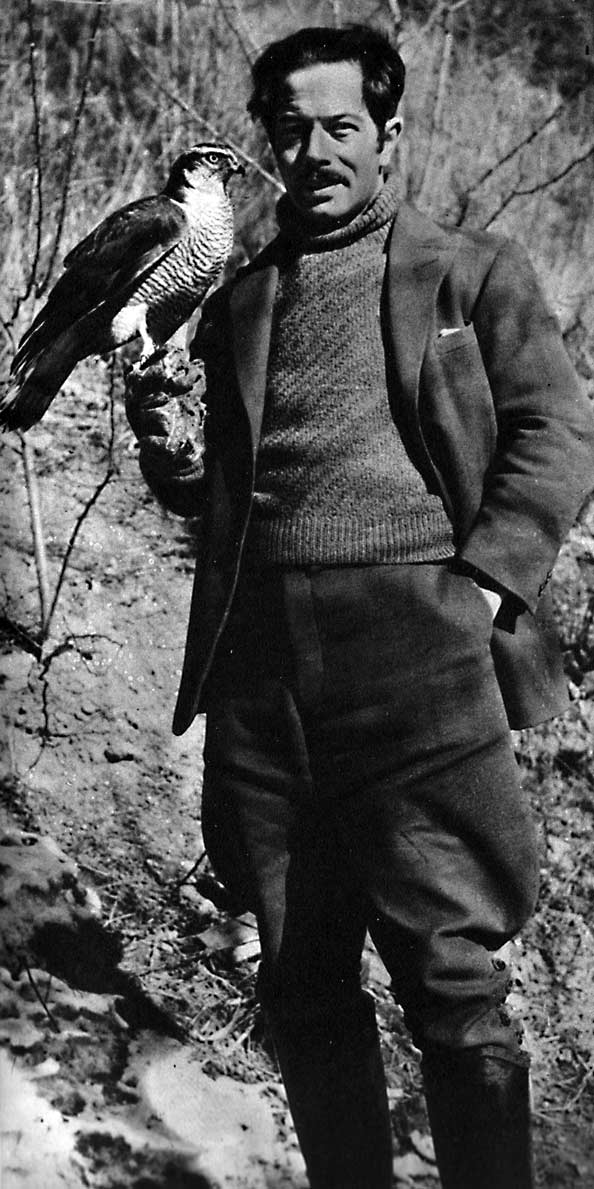
- Born: 20 October 1895; Ransäter, Sweden
- Died: 19 February 1975
- Known for: explorations
- Scientific career
- Fields: zoology

Sten Bergman (20 October 1895 – 19 February 1975) was a Swedish zoologist and adventurer who visited Korea, Kamchatka, Papua New Guinea, Japan and many other places.

== Career ==
Bergman was born in Ransäter, Sweden, and was the son of professor Johan Bergman and Kerstin Henriksson. He passed his studentexamen in 1914 and obtained a Bachelor of Arts degree in 1917, Licentiate of Philosophy degree in 1925 and became an honorary doctor in Stockholm in 1952.

He was acting assistance and acting director of the Swedish Museum of Natural History during different periods from 1923. Bergman was a popular science lecturer from 1923 and conducted tours in Central Europe in 1926, 1933 and 1955, in Italy in 1955 as well as in Japan in 1960 and 1962. He was explorer in the Kamchatka Peninsula from 1920 to 1923, in the Kuril Islands from 1929 to 1930, in Korea from 1935 to 1936 and in New Guinea from 1948 to 1949, 1952 to 1953 and from 1956 to 1959.

Bergman was an honorary member of the Royal Danish Geographical Society and corresponding member of the Geographische Gesellschaft i Vienna.

== Travels to Japan ==
Bergman visited Japan on several occasions during his expeditions in the 1920s and 1930s during his explorations of the Kamchatka Peninsula (1920-1923), Kuril Islands (1929-1930) and Korea (1935-1936).

He would later return to the Japanese islands in 1960-1962 which resulted in his travel book Det Fagra Landet (1962). During his travels in the country he travelled extensively and visited such places as Tokyo, Mount Fuji, Hokkaido, Yamagata, Matsushima, Kinkazan and Izu Oshima. As during his earlier visits in the 1920s and 30s Bergman spent time with the Ainu people.

His travels in Japan resulted in the ornithological study of several Japanese species and breeds of birds such as Red-crowned crane, the famous Onagadori, Great egret, Little grebe, White-cheeked starling and the Siberian rubythroat.

== Expedition to Korea ==
Bergman's 1938 book In Korean Wilds And Villages recounts an expedition to study the birds found in the North of Korea. Traveling with a taxidermist, Bergman also collected specimens for the Swedish Natural History and Ethnographical museums. The book also provides commentaries on various aspects of Korean culture and wildlife.

== Cannibalism In New Guinea ==
In his 1962 book My father is a cannibal, Bergman relates the experiences of two years spent with his wife in New Guinea from 1956 to 1958. He describes his adoption by the Papuan Chief Pinim, and his wife, Akintjes, and the festivals, ceremonies and cannibalistic practises of the native Papuans. The book also includes his observations of interesting plants and animals, including the tree kangaroos, forest turkeys, flame-coloured lianas, Bauhinia and flying beetles.

== Personal life ==
In 1920, Bergman married Dagny Lindhé (born 1890), the daughter of major Nils Lindhé and Ida Arnell. He was the father of the nature photographer and writer Astrid Bergman Sucksdorff (1927–2015). Bergman died in 1975 and was buried at Salem cemetery in Salem Municipality on the cape closest to Bornsjön.

== Awards and decorations ==
Bergman's awards:

- Commander of the Order of the Polar Star
- Knight of the Order of Vasa
- Officer of the Order of Orange-Nassau
- Anders Retzius medal in silver
- Royal Swedish Academy of Sciences' Linné Medal in gold
- Travellers Club's medal in silver
- Johan August Wahlberg's medal in silver

== Bibliography ==
- Through Kamchatka by Dog-Sled and Skis by Sten Bergman (Seeley, Service & Co., Ltd., 1927), ISBN 978-1-135-48149-0.
- Sport and exploration in the far east by Sten Bergman (Methuen & Co. 1933)
- In Korean Wilds And Villages by Sten Bergman (1938), translated by Frederic Whyte.
- My Father Is A Cannibal by Sten Bergman (Robert Hale, 1961)
- Blåhake, Tiger, Pungbjörn Och Andra Djur by Sten Bergman, Albert Bonniers Förlag (1947)
- Det Fagra Landet (Albert Bonniers Förlag, 1962)
