= 2nd Guldbagge Awards =

Annual Swedish film awards ceremony

- Date: 15 October 1965
- Site: Röda Kvarn & city hall/Golden Hall, Stockholm, Sweden

Highlights
- Best Picture: Swedish Wedding Night

The 2nd Guldbagge Awards ceremony, presented by the Swedish Film Institute, honored the best Swedish films of 1964 and 1965, and took place on 15 October 1965. Swedish Wedding Night directed by Åke Falck was presented with the award for Best Film.

== Awards ==
- Best Film: Swedish Wedding Night by Åke Falck
- Best Director: Arne Sucksdorff for My Home Is Copacabana
- Best Actor: Jarl Kulle for Swedish Wedding Night
- Best Actress: Eva Dahlbeck for The Cats
- Special Achievement: Leif Furhammar
