= Astrid Bergman Sucksdorff =

Swedish nature photographer and children's writer (1927–2015)

- Born: January 17, 1927; Stockholm, Sweden
- Died: January 12, 2015 (aged 87); Skara, Sweden
- Occupations: Photographer, author
- Spouse: Arne Sucksdorff (m. 1951–1964)
- Father: Sten Bergman

Astrid Bergman Sucksdorff (17 January 1927 – 12 January 2015) was a Swedish nature photographer and children's writer. She received the Astrid Lindgren Prize in 1984.

Born in Stockholm, she was the daughter of Dagny Lindhé and the well-known zoologist and adventurer Sten Bergman. She was a photographer and children's writer for most of her life. Her interest in photography started when she got a job as an assistant to a Stockholm photographer before she turned 20. As a photographer, she was active in documentary, art and nature photography. She also worked as a press photographer during her early career. She wrote several books, including children's books. She died on 12 January 2015 in Skara, Sweden, where she lived near the end of her life.

== Selected works ==
- 1953 – Micki rävungen
- 1959 – Chendru får en tiger (based on Chendru Ram Mandavi)
- 1964 – Ödetorpet
- 1965 – Tiger i sikte
- 1967 – En bok om rådjur
- 1970 – Toni, elefantförarens son
- 1971 – Tranorna vid Hornborgasjön
- 1975 – Förstoringsglaset
- 1977 – Till en jaktkamrat
- 1978 – Blommor
- 1979 – Insekter
- 1979 – Fåglar
- 1980 – Vilda djur
- 1982 – Träd
- 1984 – Saras hundvalp
- 1984 – Gläntan
- 1988 – Djur i naturen, däggdjur, fåglar, insekter
- 1990 – Träd & Blommor
- 1990 – Möten med djur i skogar, vid vattendrag, kring hus
- 1991 – Mina första vilda djur
- 1991 – Mina första små kryp
- 1991 – Mina första fåglar
- 1991 – Mina första blommor
- 1991 – Djur på landet
- 1992 – Mina första fåglar vid vattnet
- 1992 – Mina första djur på zoo
- 1993 – Mina första trädgårdsblommor
- 1993 – Mina första husdjur
- 1997 – Med livet i fokus

== Awards ==
- Astrid Lindgren Prize, 1984
