= Xuxa em Sonho de Menina =

2007 film directed by Rudi Lagemann

- Theatrical release poster
- Directed by: Rudi Lagemann
- Written by: Flávio de Souza
- Produced by: Luiz Cláudio Moreira; Mônica Muniz
- Starring: Xuxa Meneghel; Letícia Botelho; Carlos Casagrande; Alice Borges; Betty Lago; Dirce Migliaccio; Marcelo Adnet
- Cinematography: Andre Horta; Paulo Souza
- Edited by: Aruanã Cavalleiro; Marcelo Moraes
- Music by: Ary Sperling; Vanessa Alves
- Production companies: PlayArte; Conspiraçao Filmes; Globo Filmes; Warner Bros. Pictures
- Distributed by: Warner Bros. Pictures
- Release date: December 21, 2007
- Running time: 107 minutes
- Country: Brazil
- Language: Portuguese
- Budget: R$ 6.0 million
- Box office: R$ 1.8 million

Xuxa em Sonho de Menina (transl. Xuxa in Girl's Dream) is a 2007 Brazilian fantasy children's film, written by Flávio de Souza and directed by Rudi Lagemann. It was the first film with the actress Xuxa (Xuxa Meneghel) to be directed by Conspiração Filmes, and was distributed by Warner Bros. Pictures and Globo Filmes. The film starred Xuxa Meneghel and Letícia Botelho, with the participation of Carlos Casagrande, Alice Borges, Betty Lago, Dirce Migliaccio, and Marcelo Adnet.

In the film, Xuxa plays a teacher, Kika, whose dream is to be an actress. Encouraged by her childhood best friend, Lara, Kika decides to go to Rio de Janeiro for an audition. However, a misunderstanding separates the two friends. Kika, alone in a bus station, finds a group of children who are going on a bus to Rio for an important math test. Kika ends up getting on the bus and the trip is the backdrop to many adventures and discoveries. A spell makes Kika go back to being a child - and she ends up dealing with the children's antics at a roadside hotel.

The film was released on December 21, 2007, in Brazil. It performed poorly at the box office, grossing R$6 million reais with more than 1,814,152 million box offices. Sonho de Menina received negative reviews from critics and audiences.

== Plot ==
Kika (Xuxa Meneghel) is a math teacher in a quiet inner-city who cherishes her dream of being an actress. Encouraged by her childhood friend, Lara (Alice Borges), she decides to participate in a casting test in Rio de Janeiro. After losing her wallet and quarreling with Lara, Kika finds herself at the bus station alone and without a penny in her pocket. The young teacher is then approached by a sweet grandmother, Vozinha (Dirce Migliaccio), who kindly invites her to board the Stromboli, a bus that is taking her own granddaughter (Raquel Bonfante) and six other children to do a math test in Rio. Kika becomes friends with the two while waiting for the departure of the bus.

Beginning with a TV report in which Lara and Pandora (Betty Lago) appear, a news reporter is seen asking for information regarding their whereabouts. Frightened, and fearing the police presence at the bus station, Kika accepts a magic cookie offered by Vozinha, the effect of which makes her a child again. So it is that as Kikinha (Letícia Botelho) joins the group of Stromboli.

The pilot Olavo (Luan Assimos), MP9 (Gabriel Lepsch) and Batata (Victor Andrade) are also on the bus, along with the patrons Glorinha (Maria Clara David), Thayane (Gabrielly Nunes) and Vanessa (Isabela Cunha). But the engine pifa and the troupe are forced to spend a night in a roadside hotel - run by the hard-nosed Elói (Marcelo Adnet). It is there where the characters will live out their most entertaining adventures and learn a little more about themselves.

The story unfolds amid positive messages regarding ecological issues, the background of the novel between Kika and the environmentalist Ricardo (Carlos Casagrande). On a symbolic journey that does not always need to tread real roads, Kika learns that, rather than focusing on the destination, one must be aware of the paths one chooses to arrive at it. It is important to believe in the signs that life offers us, so that the true dream of each person can be realized.

== Cast ==
- Xuxa Meneghel as Kika
- Letícia Botelho as Kikinha (kika children)
- Carlos Casagrande as Ricardo
- Alice Borges as Lara
- Raquel Bonfante as Juju
- Dirce Migliaccio as Deolinda
- Betty Lago as Pandora Raquel
- Marcelo Adnet as Elói
- Sergio Loroza as Jeandro
- Isabella Cunha as Vanessa
- Maria Clara David as Glorinha
- Gabrielly Nunes as Thayane
- Luan Assimos as Olavo
- Victor Andrade as Batata
- Milton Gonçalves as school principal
- Letícia Spiller as mother of Kikinha
- Ilana Kaplan as tia Memélia
- Gabriel Lepsch as Maicon Pereira (MP9)
- Gilberto Torres as dad of Glória

== Production ==
=== Background and conception ===
Xuxa Meneghel, who is the owner of the highest average audience in the resumption of Brazilian cinema (2.5 million per film) and accumulated box office, created her new feature film Xuxa en Sonho de Menina, the 17th of her career. grossing R$6 million reais. This is the first cinematographic partnership of Xuxa Produções with Conspiração Filmes in the making of feature films (the producer has already signed the DVD Xuxa Só Para Baixinhos 7 (2007). The co-production is from Globo Filmes and Warner Bros. The actress and host already have more than 35 million viewers since 1983, the year of her film debut. In 1988, the host starred in her first feature (Super Xuxa contra Baixo Astral). Its biggest box office is Lua de Cristal (1990): with 5 million viewers. The idea of producing a film with this content came from the very personal experience of Xuxa. When she was 10 years old, Xuxa dreamed of having a bluebird. Although she had heard from her mother that, unfortunately, that was not possible, she did not give up on the dream and continued to believe, until one day, a real bluebird came through her window and became part of the family. The event - a landmark in the life of the host - is used as a starting point for Sonho de Menina, which deals precisely with one of Xuxa's greatest convictions: the importance of believing in dreams for them to come true. Xuxa explained the concept of the film.

"The most important thing was to make a movie with a message for people to reflect on. That is, you have to chase after your dreams, but also pay attention to the signs that come along the way. She has a vocation for what she wants."

The screenplay by Flavio de Souza, responsible for the plot of other films of the hosts, such as Xuxinha e Guto contra os Monstros do Espaço (2005), Xuxa e o Tesouro da Cidade Perdida (2004) and Xuxa Abracadabra (2003). His text came to life through the eyes of director Rudi Lagemann, the "Foguinho", invited by Conspiração Filmes, especially for the project. He explained the concept of the film.

"I understand cinema as a product of the fusion between art and technology, which was born with the vocation of the people. Define the activity of the company: careful with the production, technical dedication, do not save on hiring talent, in short, deliver a product well done".

=== Cast ===
The role of Kikinha, the children's version of the protagonist, was Leticia Botelho, who had already participated in the feature films Ouro Negro (2006) and Fica Comigo Essa Noite (2006), as well as presenting the program Janela Janelinha on TVE Brasil. To accomplish the scenes, Leticia had an intense preparation with the director and Xuxa, who had to observe to capture both the gestural and the way of speaking of the hosts. "Staying with Xuxa, playing with the little rocker and the kids was a lot of fun," says the young eight-year-old actress. I find it harder in the scene where you do not speak, but you have to record the expressions because you can not open your mouth to speak. You have to speak with your face," he continues.

The cast also includes Betty Lago (in the role of Pandora Raquel, a powerful TV producer), Ilana Kaplan (Aunt Memelia, who takes care of the children on the trip), Alice Borges (Lika, Kika's best friend), Sérgio Loroza the driver Jeandro) and Marcelo Adnet (Elói, the hotel's doer). And with special guest appearances by Dirce Migliaccio (the grandmother of one of the girls on the tour), Letícia Spiller (mother of Kika as a child), Milton Gonçalves (director of the school where she works) and Alexandra Richter (a casting producer).

In the children's cast, the film star Maria Clara David, who previously had participated in commercials and TV shows, such as Zorra Total, Sob Nova Direção and Linha Direta, by Globo TV, stand out. She plays Glorinha, a girl who is pressured by her parents to pursue a future that is not exactly what she dreams for herself. "The movie talks about it too. You have to think about whether you're running after the right dream, or if that's not just the dream your father or mother wants for you, "says Xuxa.

Carlos Casagrande lives with Ricardo, the romantic couple of Xuxa, and leads the environmental message of the film. He plays a biologist and environmental secretary for Quimera, a fictional city where people are ecologically conscious and take care of everything not to attack the planet. "Xuxa is a very calm person. It's very nice to work with her" says Casagrande. For the actor, the director Foguinho has a lot of patience and tranquility to deal with children. "His sensitivity is very great. He passes everything he wants from the actor in a very clear way. First, it makes you feel comfortable doing what you have in your head, and then it shapes."

=== Filming ===
Most of the scenes from "Xuxa en Sonho de Menina" were filmed on location in the capital and the interior of the state of Rio de Janeiro, in only two days. Places known to Cariocas, such as the Glauce Rocha Theater in the center, and the Lage Park, in addition to the Hotel Le Canton in Teresópolis, were redecorated and served as a setting for history. The Jockey Club, located in the South Zone of Rio, was transformed into a bus station and, to look like a small town terminal, only a small part of the central hall in which the betting bag occurs was used. It is at this point in the film that the transition from reality to the dream happens and vice versa. In this way, the space had to be decorated in two different ways, to distinguish both universes. "We created two versions for every road sign, real-world signs were more facetious, square, and dreamy," says Art Director Daniel Flaksman. It was a mansion in Alto da Boa Vista that received the main scenes of the film, to generate the "cartunesca" atmosphere of Hotel Paratodos. "The hotel is the greatest setting in terms of concepts because we had to change the facade, the reception, the dining room, the staircase, the corridors and the rooms," says Flaksman.

Each of the rooms was ornamented with strange objects ordered improbably. The idea was to bring in "visual jokes" so that the environment would indeed look like a dream. "We put a picture upside down, a giant log book... it has a wall with several clocks, the pointers do not walk and each one sets a different time. Why don't they walk? Because time stands still, "he explains. One day after the filming began, director Rudi Lagemann already felt the usual apprehension that precedes the beginning of the production of a feature film. "We are anxious, in a hallucinatory rhythm of preparation, an immense team of artists and technicians rehearsing, designing choreographies, making costumes, constructing scenarios to arrive at this magic hour that is to enter the set, and we can say the blessed word: 'Action!' "Said the director, at the time, noting that filming is, in all its aspects, a moment of great pleasure. "I feel privileged. I love filming, solving typical shooting problems, exchanging ideas, directing actors, and choosing camera angles. It's very enjoyable to get along with good-humored and intelligent people, and the movies provide that."

Preparing the cast during pre-production helped to ensure that everyone was tuned in to shoot the scenes. Xuxa participated actively in the trials. "I really like essays because we exchange ideas with them and consistently build the dramatic tempo of a cinematic narrative. Adults and children rehearsed with Xuxa. These rehearsals were marked by fun and professionalism and all contributed to characterize their characters and give internal rhythm to the scenes" says Foguinho. The Xuxa em Sonho de Menina set was marked by the daily presence of many children. In addition to the children cast, on many occasions, the children of team members were invited to watch the footage. This made the environment a relaxed place, which eventually infected the adults. "We have become a little brat, having fun as they have fun," confirms actor Serjão Loroza. "I really like being in touch with the kids because they bring new energy to the set," adds Dirce Migliaccio. At the time of the scenes, however, the work was taken very seriously. "We used to play every day and rehearsal was messy all the time, but at the time of the scene it was full concentration," says Maria Clara David, who plays Glorinha. After four weeks on the set, he was sure that the work was well done, despite the short time to meet the schedule. For the director, the professionalism of his team and the serenity of Xuxa were determining factors for the good environment of filming. "The great difficulty was the meager time for preparation and filming. The team was able to transform, with creativity and talent, such difficulty in quality differential ", praises. "What could become a tense process has become something pleasurable. And much of this is due to the playful and peaceful spirit of Xuxa", he adds.

=== Special effects ===
The visual effects were developed and executed by the post-production team of Conspiração Filmes, in partnership with Megacolor, under the supervision of Cláudio Peralta and Adenilson Muri Cunha, two specialists in the area. "We have already begun the process knowing what scenes we would play in the story. Our main job was to print a magical and fanciful character at specific points in the film. They are subtle and beautiful effects, pleasant for both adults and children", says Peralta.

=== Music Production ===
Ary Sperling is the author of the musical production and soundtrack of the film, whose theme "Sonho de Menina (Eu Acredito)" is a collaboration between him and Vanessa Alves, who has participated in other projects of the presenter, such as the DVD Xuxa Só Para Baixinhos 7. "The song was based on the script and the elements that Xuxa asked were: talking about imagination, the power to believe in things and run after your dreams, and paying attention to the signs. It seems like an obvious thing, but a lot of people do not realize the circumstances of life" summarizes Ary.

=== Release ===
The press conference of presentation of the film occurred on December 14, 2007, The premiere took place on December 11, 2007, in São Paulo and December 19, 2007, in Rio de Janeiro. The site teaser was developed by the agency RMG Connect, the site allows Internet users to check the teaser trailer, some photos, the synopsis and the technical file of the film. The film was released on December 21, 2007.

== Reception ==
=== Critical response ===
The site Cine Dica gave an average score of 34 points to the movie. The audience surveyed by Filmow gave the film an average of 2.1 votes. The AdoroCinema audience gave the film four and a half stars out of five, and an average of 3.5 points. In a poll conducted by The Enemy, the film was voted worst of the year, with more than 52% of the audience vote.

Diego Benevides writing for Cinema com Rapadura, gave the film only a 1 note, defined Xuxa em Sonho de Menina, as one more unsuccessful onslaught from the children's film presenter, writing that "The story of Flávio de Souza has more quality than the lousy Xuxa Gêmeas, but still makes a point of highlighting the TV hots as a child. There is always the moment when Xuxa equals the public, whether in the way of dressing or telepathy with a teddy bear named Bebeto. Xuxa is already in her forties and the main reason for the failure in its televising or cinematographic attacks is to remain in the usual." He praised the adult cast of the film, however, considered them to be "in a story that no character is deepened, other than Xuxa herself or her miniature, the nice Leticia Botelho." To the critic "all the technical aspects are regrettable, but the soundtrack and the sound can be shameful. In addition to the invariable songs that accompany the heroes in the story, the audience has yet to witness the constant use of 'toin' BGs and such 'grace-making' stuff in the story. It even seems that the technical team is doing one of those pictures of the children's program of Xuxa, without the slightest responsibility of having a cinematic posture." A critic of Cineclick, compared Sonho de Menina, with the previous film of Xuxa, Lua de Cristal (1989), for having as an intention to transmit to the viewers "messages of realizing the dreams, but now the presenter wants to give a new learning to the" little ones: to want, power and achieve. It is the formula of success." He defined the film's script as "autobiographical, with stories from Xuxa's past, seasoned with fiction." He praised the performance of Letícia Botelho, writing that she has a "sweet and sweet way that enchants." But she criticized the script for the film, stating that "What could signal a change of style in a production starring Xuxa is not happening, as Xuxa em Sonho de Menina retains the characteristics of her previous films that is not found in this production, the pattern of the previous ones is followed: adventure, a light novel, children and a hideous villain." The Cine Gospel site criticized the film's performances, writing that "they are all pretty bad, taking away from the always excellent veteran Dirce Migliaccio." The actress children are not good enough and Xuxa plays, as always, Xuxa. He praised the production for representing a breakthrough in Xuxa's film career, writing that unlike his predecessors, "it does not bring fashionable singers as pseudo-actors, and the audience is largely spared from traditional musical numbers." The site defined the story as puerile by writing that it can even reveal its superficiality if we think it is aimed at children. But according to him, the children deserved more. Luiz Joaquim writing for the Cinema Escrito said that there is something nice in "Sonho de Menina", unlike his recent work for the movies. "The fact that it is an urban story with a few fantastic elements has made it closer, and therefore easier, in a good way." For the author, the ecologically correct galan interpreted by Carlos Casagrande, "has no narrative function, only to be beautiful." but he praised the performance of Sergio Loroza, as the driver of the Stromboli bus. Writing that "Despite the weight, Segio transits light through the entire film." Writing for the Omelette, Marcelo Forlani wrote that "In the movie, Xuxa dreams of being an actress, but in real life, she has given up." Mariane Morisawa from Terra gave the film three stars. She wrote that the film "is funny and reminds us in some moments of the presenter's trajectory, but misses mixing ecological messages with messages about dreams".

=== Box office ===
Xuxa em Sonho de Menina was a box office failure, conquering a smaller audience than all the films starring the TV hots since Xuxa Requebra (1999), accounting for meager 309,174 box offices. The bad performance of the films of TV hots recorded in recent years is the result of the separation between Xuxa and Diler & Associados. Xuxinha e Guto contra os Monstros do Espaço (2005), an animated film that had the special participation of the presenter in flesh and blood, was until then the lowest income of the brand, with 596,218 spectators. The latter, Xuxa Gêmeas (2006), garnered just over a million box offices. The film was withdrawn from display in theaters in Rio de Janeiro, and just 2 months after its launch, due to the weak box office, continuing in only 16 other rooms in Brazil. The film grossed only 1,814,152 million reais, the lowest gross of a film starring Xuxa, of all time.

== See also ==
- List of Brazilian films of 2007
