= My Home Is Copacabana =

1965 film

- Directed by: Arne Sucksdorff
- Written by: João Bethencourt; Flávio Migliaccio; Arne Sucksdorff
- Starring: Leila Santos de Sousa
- Cinematography: Arne Sucksdorff
- Edited by: Arne Sucksdorff
- Release date: 29 March 1965
- Running time: 88 minutes
- Country: Sweden
- Language: Swedish

My Home Is Copacabana (Swedish: Mitt hem är Copacabana) is a 1965 Swedish drama film directed by Arne Sucksdorff. It was entered into the 1965 Cannes Film Festival and the 4th Moscow International Film Festival. Sucksdorff won the award for Best Director at the 2nd Guldbagge Awards.

In 2019, Toninho's daughter Anna de Lima Fagerlind published a book titled "My Home is Not Copacabana" about her father's experience in connection with the filming. According to the book, Toninho was nine years old when Sucksdorff came to Rio and picked him to star in the movie. Toninho was presented as an orphan street child, which was not true as he had a mother and siblings and lived in a favela house overlooking Ipanema beach, and was flown to Sweden to promote the movie. While in Sweden, a wealthy family offered to adopt Toninho, and his mother reluctantly agreed having seen his brother slide into criminality.

== Cast ==
- Leila Santos de Sousa - Lici (as Leila)
- Cosme dos Santos - Jorginho (as Cosme)
- Josafá Da Silva Santos - Paulinho (as Josafá)
- Toninho Carlos de Lima - Rico (as Toninho)
- Herminia Gonçalves
- Dirce Migliaccio
- João Lucas
- Flávio Migliaccio
- Alvaro Peres
- Andrey Salvador
- Antonio Pitanga
- Joel Barcellos
- Alberto Carvalho
- Walter Lira
- Benedito de Assis
- Anael Pereira
- Allan Edwall - Narrator (voice)
