= All Is Possible in Granada (1954 film) =

1954 film

- Film poster
- Directed by: José Luis Sáenz de Heredia
- Written by: José Luis Sáenz de Heredia; Carlos Blanco
- Starring: Merle Oberon; Francisco Rabal; Rafael Bardem
- Cinematography: Theodore J. Pahle
- Edited by: Julio Peña
- Music by: Ernesto Halffter
- Production company: Chapalo Films
- Distributed by: Orbi Films
- Release date: 8 March 1954
- Running time: 90 minutes
- Country: Spain
- Language: Spanish

All Is Possible in Granada (Spanish: Todo es posible en Granada) is a 1954 Spanish comedy film directed by José Luis Sáenz de Heredia and starring Merle Oberon, Francisco Rabal and Rafael Bardem. It was entered into the 1954 Cannes Film Festival. In 1982 it was remade under the same title. The film's sets were designed by the art director Ramiro Gómez.

The film was shot in black and white but also contains several fantasy and musical scenes with Antonio 'the Dancer' and his ballet, all of them shot in color with the Spanish cinefotocolor system, of which few examples remain.

== Plot ==
Following a prologue in the early 19th century concerning the finding of a hoard belonging to Boabdil, the fiction moves forward to 1950s Granada, involving the arrival of an American mining company to the city and the expropriation of land plots in the surroundings in order to extract uranium.

== Cast ==
- Merle Oberon as Margaret Faulson
- Francisco Rabal as Fernando Ortega
- Peter Damon as Robbie
- Rafael Bardem as Mr. Taylor
- Félix Dafauce as Mr. Olivier
- Gustavo Re as Quincallero
- José Isbert as Joaquín
- Antonio Riquelme as Padre del limpiabotas
- José G. Rey as Mr. Cummings
- Antonio Fernández as Sereno
- Luis Pérez de León as Anticuario
- Joaquín Roa as Labrador 1º
- José Alburquerque as Corregidor
- Arturo Marín as El Jerezano
- Casimiro Hurtado as Labrador 2º
- Félix Briones
- Pedro Giménez 'El Pili' as El Petaca
- Josefina Fortea as Peggy
- Maruja Coral as Mujer
- Antonio (actor) as Limpiabotas
- Rosita Segovia as Primera Bailarina

== Bibliography ==
- Mira, Alberto. The A to Z of Spanish Cinema. Rowman & Littlefield, 2010.
