= Mr. Forbush and the Penguins =

1971 British film by Roy Boulting

- Directed by: Roy Boulting (uncredited); Al Viola; Antarctica sequences Arne Sucksdorff
- Written by: Anthony Shaffer
- Based on: novel by Graham Billing
- Produced by: Henry Trettin
- Starring: John Hurt; Hayley Mills
- Cinematography: Edward Scaife
- Edited by: Bernard Gribble
- Music by: John Addison
- Production companies: EMI Films; PGL Productions
- Distributed by: British Lion Films
- Release date: December 1971 (UK)
- Running time: 101 minutes
- Country: United Kingdom
- Language: English
- Budget: £638,842

Mr. Forbush and the Penguins (also known as Cry of the Penguins) is a 1971 British comedy drama film, directed by Arne Sucksdorff, Alfred Viola and Roy Boulting. It stars John Hurt, Hayley Mills, Dudley Sutton and Tony Britton. The screenplay was adapted by playwright Anthony Shaffer, based on the 1965 novel Forbush and the Penguins by Graham Billing.

== Plot ==
A brilliant biology student, Richard Forbush, is sent to Antarctica for six months to study a penguin colony. At first he does it mostly to impress a girl he is chasing, Tara. He stays in Shackleton's Hut with his only links to the outside world being a two-way radio to contact the navy who occasionally visit to deliver supplies and take his letters and tape recordings to Tara.

He is challenged mentally by skuas preying on the penguins' eggs and chicks and he builds a catapult to try to fight them although he is meant to observe and not interfere with nature. He is reminded of this by his failure to get rid of the skuas.

By the end of his expedition, Forbush is a changed man with a totally new outlook on life.

== Cast ==
- John Hurt as Richard Forbush
- Hayley Mills as Tara St. John Luke
- Dudley Sutton as Starshot
- Tony Britton as George Dewport
- Thorley Walters as Mr. Forbush Sr.
- Judy Campbell as Mrs. Forbush
- Joss Ackland as The leader
- Nicholas Pennell as Julien
- Avril Angers as Fanny
- Cyril Luckham as Tringham
- Sally Geeson as Jackie
- Brian Oulton as foodstore clerk
- John Comer as Police Sergeant
- Hugh Moxey as Lord Cheddar
- Burnell Tucker as The co-pilot

== Production ==
=== Development ===
The film was based on a 1965 novel by Graham Billing, who had worked for the New Zealand Antarctic Division. Film rights were bought by PGL, a production company of two Americans living in London, Al Viola and Henry Trettin, who made commercials.

PGL succeeded in raising finance from EMI Films and British Lion Films, in association with the National Film Finance Corporation. Each pledged £200,000 each.

Forbush was part of the initial slate of movies greenlit by Bryan Forbes who had been appointed head of EMI. Forbes announced it in August 1969 as part of fifteen films. Forbes was enthusiastic about backing new talent and Forbush would be the first feature film for director Viola, producer and screenwriter Anthony Shaffer. Viola and Trettin had a strong track record making television commercials while Schaffer was an established playwright.

Swedish filmmaker Arne Sucksdorff was hired to shoot footage in Antarctica using associate producer Gordon L.T. Scott. Forbes later described the film as a "calculated risk" with an "intriguing script" and "formidable logistical problems... Admittedly a far cry from The Sound of Music, but positively different and worth attempting." Finance came from British Lion, EMI and the National Film Finance Corporation. Filmink later argued " it boggles the mind that" Forbes "allowed someone as green as Al Viola to direct Forbush which involved having to match footage with scenes shot in Antarctica."

The original stars were John Hurt and Susan Fleetwood. Fleetwood was under contract to the Royal Shakespeare Company. According to Sidney Gilliat of British Lion, that company only agreed to invest "under the strict understanding that Michael Crawford played the lead and certain revisions were made to the script. In the event, neither undertaking was carried out but British Lion was still left holding part of the baby."

=== Shooting ===
Filming started 4 November 1969 at Palmer Peninsula in Antarctica. Fifteen technicians, including the producer Henry Trettin and director Al Viola, plus John Hurt, travelled to Antarctica and stayed for eight weeks living at Esperanza Base. It was the first movie to be shot on that continent. Scott researched the trip by consulting with members of Sir Vivian Fuchs' British Antarctic Survey and John Green accompanied them as a technical adviser. "It’s really astonishing the things a unit needs on a five-week trip, but of course there's no shop on the corner they can pop out to if you’ve missed out some small item," said Scott.

This was followed by studio work at Elstree Studios. By March 1970 it was reported that filming was expected to finish soon.

=== Reshoots ===
According to Forbes, penguin footage shot by Arne Sucksdorff on location in Antarctica did not cut smoothly into scenes involving humans shot in the studio. He says the Boulting Brothers, Frank Launder and Sidney Gilliat, then on the Board of British Lion "were adamant that drastic changes had to be made. They insisted that the director be replaced together with the leading lady and that the Boultings take over the rescripting and reshooting with Hayley Mills, then Roy Boulting’s wife, recast as the female lead. I felt that such drastic surgery was bound to make matters worse at such a late and critical stage but I was outvoted and landed with the unhappy task of conveying these decisions to those concerned."

Teddy Darvas, an editor working at EMI, had wanted to work on the movie ("a wonderful script") but lost the job to Bernard Gribble; according to Darvas the film was "a mess" and Gribble "was very, very unhappy. He went in one day to these two Americans and he said something which I always give him screen credit for but I say this in front of directors and producers, always naming him. He went in and he said 'You know you had a six month option on my goodwill and that has just expired'."

Viola was replaced by Roy Boulting and Susan Fleetwood by Hayley Mills. John Hurt was angry at this and Bryan Forbes of EMI claimed he had to spend an entire evening persuading him not to quit. Filming involving Hayley Mills took place in November 1970 at Shepperton Studios.

Madeleine Smith, who had been cast as Hurt's girlfriend, recalled she was also cut from the film, along with Madhav Sharma, saying "I was told to go and forget the stills and the photographs and take them home quick... it was to be a vehicle for Haley rather than Susan Fleetwood starring in it. And Susan Fleetwood was a fantastic, RSC actress. I think it was a foolish move."

Anthony Shaffer, the screenwriter, recalled it as "a fairly chaotic movie which had the young John Hurt capering about the Atlantic slinging rocks at Skuas with a Roman balista, in a vain attempt to protect penguins' eggs from their deprivations. I'm not sure that it all added up, though my younger daughter assures me... it's her favourite film of mine." He added that the female lead "was replaced after the first rough assembly and it was the only film I know of in which a stage direction was delivered as spoken dialogue. It didn't matter. No one noticed - which should generally tell you something about the respect accorded the screen writer's craft."

Sidney Gilliat then on the board of British Lion called the film "a terrible hodgepodge" and felt Bryan Forbes "made a great mistake putting Hurt in it instead of [Michael] Crawford."

== Reception ==
=== Box office ===
The film failed to recoup its considerable cost. Sidney Gillat claimed the failure of the movie, along with Loot and The Three Sisters did particular damage to British Lion.

=== Critical reception ===
Variety called it "a corny story, overly familiar with respect to plotting and sentimentality" in which "the only bright spot" was the penguins.

The Monthly Film Bulletin wrote:

In the introduction to Forbush and the Penguins, its author Graham Billing claimed that it was "the first serious novel to come out of Antarctica". The film, as it has emerged from EMI, has managed not only to banish all seriousness but also to minimise the relevance of the Antarctic setting – this despite some fine, hard-edged location photography by Edward Scaife, and the drama of the wild-life sequences compiled by Arne Sucksdorff. Of course, the novel has been through a few mutations on its way to the screen: the original version of the film, completed by Al Viola and featuring Forbush alone with his terror in the face of the cruelty of life and death in the Antarctic, has been pruned and supplemented by entirely new framing material, set in London and shot by an uncredited Roy Boulting. This new footage inserts Hayley Mills and that weariest of old pop moralities, the futility of the promiscuous life, even bringing the point – and Forbush – confidently home with a final clinch on the London rooftops. Before being subjected to this inexplicable attack of double-think, the film conceivably held some interest. The surviving Antarctic material features some realistically gruelling action; but the central character is now reduced to the abbreviated, caricatured motions of a clown, comic and tragic by unconvincing turns.

The Guardian said the film "isn't as bad as we'd been led to believe, though there's a pretty grotty first half hour to sit through."

The Evening Standard called it "a comfortably old fashioned comedy in the Ealing tradition" in which the lead character was "a stale bore".

The movie was not released in the US until 1981. The New York Times called it "a pleasant surprise... many of these birds' best scenes have a passion and poignancy that human players don't often match."

Filmink called it "a spectacularly charmless movie in which Mills is wasted, only worth watching for its location photography. Hayley is charming in her few scenes and the film would’ve been better if she’d played the lead – she would have been more at home with the material than the actual star, John Hurt."
