= Boleiros - Era uma Vez o Futebol... =

- Directed by: Ugo Giorgetti
- Written by: Ugo Giorgetti
- Starring: Adriano Stuart; Otávio Augusto; Flávio Migliaccio; Cássio Gabus Mendes; Rogério Cardoso
- Production company: SP Filmes
- Release date: 24 April 1998
- Running time: 93 minutes
- Country: Brazil
- Language: Portuguese

Boleiros - Era uma Vez o Futebol... is a 1998 Brazilian comedy drama film written and directed by Ugo Giorgetti. The film revolves around a group of former football players who gather at a bar in São Paulo, where they reminisce about past glories and curious stories from the time when they were still professional players. The film received the Special Jury Prize at the Amiens International Film Festival in 1998 and an APCA Award for Best Screenplay in 1999. The film received a sequel, Boleiros 2 - Vencedores e Vencidos, in 2006.

== Plot ==
In a São Paulo bar, with photographs of players on the walls, a group of men share something in common: they are all boleiros—current and former football professionals. They regularly gather there to talk about matches, athletes, teams, and referees. From these conversations emerge memories of events and characters from the world of football, suffused with nostalgia.

== Cast ==
- Adriano Stuart as Otávio (former São Paulo player)
- Flávio Migliaccio as Naldinho (former Corinthians player)
- Otávio Augusto as Virgílio Paiva (Virgilio Pênalti)
- Rogério Cardoso as former referee
- João Acaiabe as Ari
- Oswaldo Campozana as Tito
- Cássio Gabus Mendes as Zé Américo
- Aldo Bueno as Paulinho Majestade (former Santos player)
- Bruno Giordano as editor
- Matinas Suzuki Júnior as himself
- Cléber Colombo as Azul (Lusa player)
- Denise Fraga as Neidinha
- Antônio Grassi as Azul's businessman
- Vitor Dourado as Vitão
- Cazé Peccini as radio announcer
- Cláudio Curi as TV commentator
- Serginho Leite as TV commentator
- Nelson Tatá Alexandre as TV commentator
- Odayr Baptista as TV commentator
- Lima Duarte as Edil, Palmeiras coach
- César Negro as Mamamá (former Palmeiras player)
- Paulo Coronato as Fabinho Guerra (Palmeiras player)
- Marisa Orth as hotel guest
- André Bicudo as Caco (Corinthians player)
- Elias Andreato as Corinthians doctor
- André Abujamra as Pai Vavá
- Henrique Stroeter as tow truck driver
- Walter Breda as Lira
- Borges de Barros as resident of the neighborhood
- Wandi Doratiotto as building doorman
- Eduardo Mancini as Corinthians fan
- Robson Nunes as Corinthians fan
- Adilson Pancho as Corinthians fan
- Ciro Jatene as radio announcer

== Reception ==
Pablo Villaça, from the website Cinema em Cena, said that "Boleiros is a film that talks about football, not about football—the match itself", focusing instead on the lives of players, coaches, and other figures connected to the sport. The film is divided into six episodes narrated by friends at a bar in São Paulo. Vilaça praises the opening episode, "Penalty", as "the funniest of the entire film", and chooses "Paulinho Majestade" as his favorite, describing it as "moving, tender" and "working marvelously well". He notes that "Azul" offers an "open critique of prejudice", but criticizes the fifth episode for having a "poorly resolved" ending and the sixth, "Frio", for being "the weakest of all", with an "unsatisfactory" resolution. He praises the "beautiful performances", especially the "wonderful performance of Flávio Migliaccio", and considers Giorgetti's direction "perfect". He concludes that the film is "yet another fine example of our cinema, deserving to be seen".

José Carlos Marques said that Boleiros, released in 1998 amid World Cup fervor, remains relevant in its themes—corruption, racism, and social inequality—but criticizes its exclusion of women's football and its melancholic, hopeless tone. He praises the film's episodic structure and its homage to São Paulo clubs, and sees it as a pioneering effort to bring football into Brazil's cultural and academic discourse. Framing it as a modern Arabian Nights, he concludes that storytelling is what keeps both the characters and the sport alive, and hopes the film would inspire further cinematic explorations of football.
