= Eduardo Conde =

Brazilian singer and actor

- Born: April 9, 1948
- Died: January 16, 2003 (aged 54)
- Occupations: Singer, actor
- Spouse: Betty Lago

Eduardo Conde (April 9, 1948 – January 16, 2003) was a Brazilian singer and actor.

He portrayed Jesus Christ Superstar in Brazil in the 1970s, and a journalist in the movie The Emerald Forest in 1985. He was married to model and actress Betty Lago for many years.
