= Ransäter Church =

Coordinates: 59°46′11″N 13°27′00″E

- Ransäter kyrka
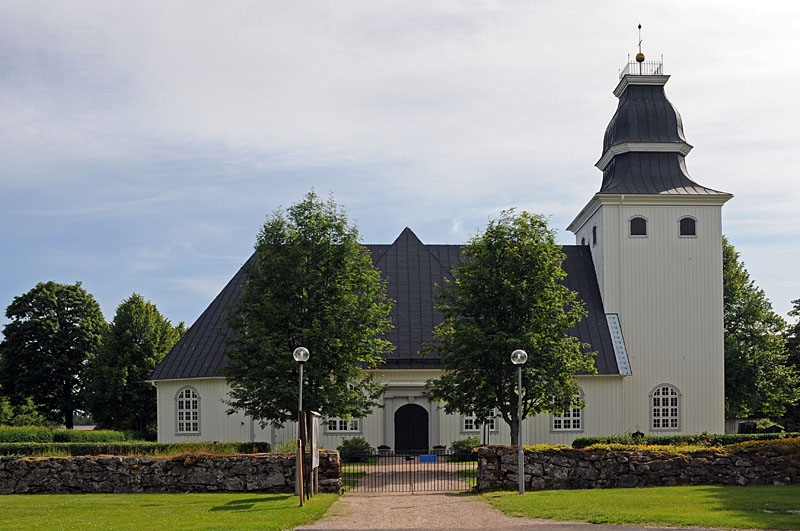
- Ransäter Church in July 2011
- Ransäter Church
- Location: Ransäter
- Country: Sweden
- Denomination: Church of Sweden

History
- Consecrated: 2 February 1986

Administration
- Diocese: Karlstad
- Parish: Forshaga-Munkfors

Ransäter Church (Swedish: Ransäters kyrka) is a wood church, located in Ransäter in Värmland, Sweden.

== History ==
In the 17th century a lumber longhouse church was built in Ransäter, after initiative from Johan Börjesson Carlberg. In the 1740s the church was rebuilt as a cross church, but on 6 December 1983 the church burnt down. The present wood church opened on Candlemas Day 1986, where the architect was Jerk Alton. The church also includes pictures by Sven-Bertil Svensson. The pipe organ in the church was built in 1988 by Grönlunds Orgelbyggeri.

Politician Tage Erlander and his wife Aina are buried on the cemetery near the church.
