= Arne Sucksdorff =

Swedish film director (1917–2001)

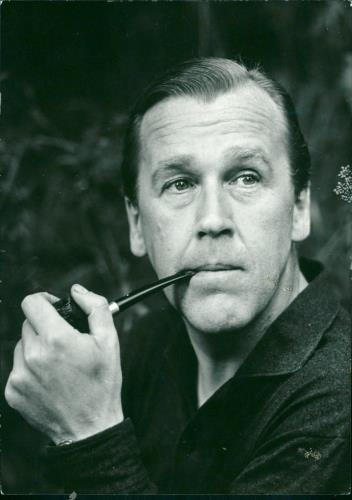
- Born: Arne Edvard Sucksdorff; 3 February 1917; Stockholm, Sweden
- Died: 4 May 2001 (aged 84); Stockholm, Sweden
- Occupation: Film director
- Years active: 1940–1972
- Spouses: Alfhild Nordendahl; Astrid Bergman (m. 1951–1964): Maria Graca
- Children: 5

Arne Edvard Sucksdorff (3 February 1917 – 4 May 2001) was a Swedish film director, considered one of cinema's greatest documentary filmmakers. He was particularly celebrated for his visually poetic and scenic nature documentaries. His works include Pojken i trädet (The Boy in the Tree) and the Academy Award-winning Människor i Stad (Symphony of a City).

Perhaps Sucksdorff's most widely admired work was the internationally acclaimed Det Stora Äventyret (1953) (The Great Adventure) about a year in the outdoors told in semidocumentary fashion from the viewpoint of a farmboy. It is noted for its remarkable photography and authentic scenes of nature, and its appeal to children for its story of domesticated otters. Sucksdorff also appeared as an actor in this film, portraying the father, while his real-life son is an actor as well. The film won the International Prize at the 1954 Cannes Film Festival and the Big Silver Medal (Documentaries and Culture Films) at the 4th Berlin International Film Festival.

In the early 1960s, Sucksdorff moved to Alghero, Sardinia, and lived there about 2 years doing spear fishing and exploring the coast with a rubber inflatable Zodiak mark V, after moved to Rio de Janeiro, where he taught cinema at the film school and continued making documentaries, as well as the documentary-style drama Mitt hem är Copacabana (My Home Is Copacabana), which is controversial due to Sucksdorff making up a back story as a street orphan for one of the main actors, a nine year old boy from Ipanema, whose daughter told the real story in a 2019 book. The film was entered into the 1965 Cannes Film Festival and the 4th Moscow International Film Festival. Sucksdorff also won the award for Best Director at the 2nd Guldbagge Awards. At the 29th Guldbagge Awards he won the Creative Achievement award.

In later life, he became an outspoken critic of deforestation and a fervent environmentalist.

Sucksdorff's last film was the 1971 feature Cry of the Penguins (also titled Mr. Forbush and the Penguins), starring John Hurt and Hayley Mills.

He died of pneumonia in May 2001 at his birthplace, Stockholm, Sweden.

== Filmography ==
=== Director ===
- Skuggor över snön (1945, Short)
- Symphony of a City (1947, Short)
- Uppbrott (short; 1948)
- Indisk by (short; 1951)
- The Great Adventure (1953) - Father
- Vinden och floden (1953, Short)
- The Flute and the Arrow (1957)
- My Home Is Copacabana (1965)
- Mr. Forbush and the Penguins (1971) (with Roy Boulting and Alfred Viola)
