= List of 2007 box office number-one films in Brazil =

This is a list of films which have placed number one at the weekend box office in Brazil during 2007 (Amounts are in Brazilian reais; 1 real is approximately equivalent to 0.64 US dollars).

== Number-one films ==
†	This implies the highest-grossing movie of the year.

Date	Film	Gross	Notes
6 January	Casino Royale	R$1.555.420	
13 January	Night at the Museum	R$4.856.380	
20 January	Night at the Museum	R$3.201.425	
27 January	A Grande Família – O Filme	R$2.563.360	Brazilian film, based on a TV series
4 February	The Pursuit of Happyness	R$2.310.923	
11 February	The Pursuit of Happyness	R$1.755.529	
18 February	The Pursuit of Happyness	R$1.070.610	
25 February	The Pursuit of Happyness	R$1.207.911	
4 March	Ghost Rider	R$3.973.064	
11 March	Ghost Rider	R$2.609.492	
18 March	Ghost Rider	R$1.821.129	
25 March	Ghost Rider	R$1.137.388	
1 April	300	R$5.507.500	
8 April	300	R$4.441.600	
15 April	300	R$2.539.280	
22 April	300	R$1.690.000	
29 April	300	R$1.134.000	
6 May	Spider-Man 3	R$14.814.652	Biggest opening weekend ever in Brazil; highest-grossing movie of 2007
13 May	Spider-Man 3	R$8.823.158	Biggest opening weekend ever in Brazil; highest-grossing movie of 2007
20 May	Spider-Man 3	R$5.913.098	Biggest opening weekend ever in Brazil; highest-grossing movie of 2007
27 May	Pirates of the Caribbean: At World's End †	R$9.452.091	
3 June	Pirates of the Caribbean: At World's End †	R$5.718.743	
10 June	Pirates of the Caribbean: At World's End †	R$3.782.077	
17 June	Shrek the Third	R$9.739.246	
24 June	Shrek the Third	R$6.026.122	
1 July	Fantastic Four: Rise of the Silver Surfer	R$4.463.545	
8 July	Fantastic Four: Rise of the Silver Surfer	R$2.819.373	
15 July	Harry Potter and the Order of the Phoenix	R$7.500.101	
22 July	Harry Potter and the Order of the Phoenix	R$2.904.724	
29 July	Harry Potter and the Order of the Phoenix	R$2.488.000	
5 August	Live Free or Die Hard	R$3.033.794	
12 August	Live Free or Die Hard	R$1.740.689	
19 August	The Simpsons Movie	R$4.989.569	
26 August	The Simpsons Movie	R$3.164.134	
2 September	The Simpsons Movie	R$2.008.166	
9 September	The Simpsons Movie	R$1.502.558	
16 September	The Simpsons Movie	R$ 656.569	
23 September	I Could Never Be Your Woman	R$ 582.025	
30 September	Next	R$ 861.225	
7 October	Resident Evil: Extinction	R$ 2.199.706	
14 October	Elite Squad	R$4.018.000	Reached #1 at its second week; highest-grossing Brazilian film of 2007
21 October	Elite Squad	R$2.576.653	Reached #1 at its second week; highest-grossing Brazilian film of 2007
28 October	Elite Squad	R$1.765.200	Reached #1 at its second week; highest-grossing Brazilian film of 2007
4 November	Surf's Up	R$2.286.521	
11 November	The Heartbreak Kid	R$1.237.900	
18 November	Mr. Magorium's Wonder Emporium	R$1.525.742	
25 November	The Heartbreak Kid	R$930.719	
2 December	Beowulf	R$1.952.010	
9 December	Bee Movie	R$2.365.694	
16 December	Bee Movie	R$1.545.737	
23 December	Bee Movie	R$924.420	
30 December	The Golden Compass	R$1.314.049	

== See also ==
- List of Brazilian films — Brazilian films by year
