= Adalbert Baltes =

German inventor

Adalbert Baltes (27 July 1916 in Wiesbaden – 5 April 1992) was a German inventor of the Cinetarium and a film producer. His short film Plastik im Freien was presented at the 1954 Cannes Film Festival.
