= Munkfors Municipality =

Munkfors Municipality Munkfors kommun
- Municipality
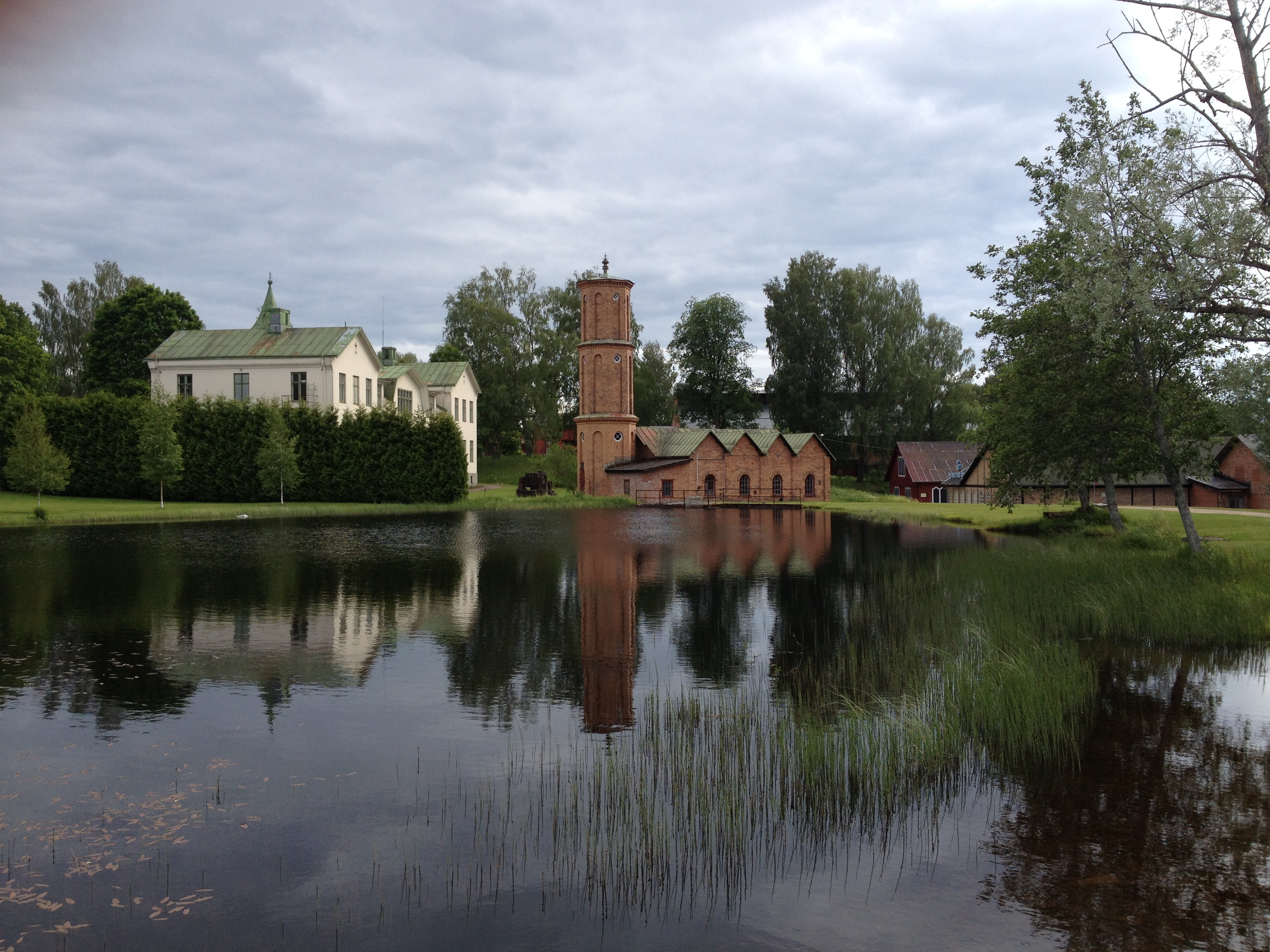

- Coat of arms

- Coordinates: 59°50′N 13°32′E
- Country: Sweden
- County: Värmland County
- Seat: Munkfors

Area
  - Total: 147.97 km^{2} (57.13 sq mi)
  - Land: 141.58 km^{2} (54.66 sq mi)
  - Water: 6.39 km^{2} (2.47 sq mi)
- Area as of 1 January 2014.

Population (30 June 2025)
  - Total: 3,627
  - Density: 25.62/km^{2} (66.35/sq mi)
- Time zone: UTC+1 (CET)
  - Summer (DST): UTC+2 (CEST)
- ISO 3166 code: SE
- Province: Värmland
- Municipal code: 1762
- Website: munkfors.se

Munkfors Municipality (Swedish: Munkfors kommun) is a municipality in Värmland County in west central Sweden. Its seat is located in the town of Munkfors.

In 1952 the rural municipality Ransäter got the title of a market town (köping) and the name Munkfors after its only built-up locality. With the local government reform of 1971 it became a municipality of unitary type without addition of territory. The municipality is today the 9th smallest by population in Sweden.

In Ransäter lies the Geijer School, in honour of author Erik Gustaf Geijer (1783–1843), who was born at the Ransäter farm. A second notable Ransäter native was Tage Erlander (1901–1985), who was Prime Minister of Sweden 1946–1969.

The municipality has one sister city: Lindsborg, Kansas, US

== Demographics ==
This is a demographic table based on Munkfors Municipality's electoral districts in the 2022 Swedish general election sourced from SVT's election platform, in turn taken from SCB official statistics.

In total there were 3,679 residents, including 2,714 Swedish citizens of voting age. 56.8% voted for the left coalition and 42.0% for the right coalition. Indicators are in percentage points except population totals and income.

Location	Residents	Citizen adults	Left vote	Right vote	Employed	Swedish parents	Foreign heritage	Income SEK	Degree
Location			%	%					
Munkfors C	1,914	1,467	61.5	37.1	73	83	17	20,124	18
Munkfors S	612	432	56.9	42.2	75	85	15	23,453	36
Munkfors V	1,153	815	48.4	50.8	81	84	16	25,469	19
Source: SVT

== Elections ==
=== Riksdag ===
These are the local results of the Riksdag elections since the 1972 municipality reform. The results of the Sweden Democrats were not published by SCB between 1988 and 1998 at a municipal level to the party's small nationwide size at the time. "Votes" denotes valid votes, whereas "Turnout" denotes also blank and invalid votes.

Year	Turnout	Votes	V	S	MP	C	L	KD	M	SD	ND
1973	94.6	3,933	4.7	67.7	0.0	15.5	6.3	1.0	4.4	0.0	0.0
1976	94.4	3,978	3.6	67.1	0.0	15.8	7.0	0.6	5.7	0.0	0.0
1979	94.2	3,871	4.8	67.4	0.0	13.7	5.3	0.5	8.0	0.0	0.0
1982	93.5	3,758	4.7	69.3	1.1	11.7	3.5	0.8	8.8	0.0	0.0
1985	90.6	3,599	4.9	68.7	0.9	9.4	7.8	0.0	8.1	0.0	0.0
1988	88.8	3,412	5.5	68.9	2.8	9.8	5.9	1.2	5.6	0.0	0.0
1991	88.2	3,326	6.1	63.0	1.6	8.7	5.4	3.2	7.8	0.0	3.5
1994	88.2	3,275	7.7	67.3	2.2	7.3	4.3	1.8	8.0	0.0	0.6
1998	81.3	2,798	16.4	57.1	2.3	5.7	2.9	6.1	8.1	0.0	0.0
2002	80.4	2,576	9.6	59.2	2.9	8.5	6.9	4.1	6.1	1.8	0.0
2006	80.7	2,492	9.1	55.8	2.4	9.7	5.5	2.7	9.5	3.2	0.0
2010	83.9	2,484	6.6	56.1	2.6	7.3	5.9	2.9	11.8	4.9	0.0
2014	85.1	2,463	4.6	58.1	2.1	6.2	3.5	2.0	9.7	11.4	0.0
2018	85.1	2,340	6.1	52.2	1.4	8.1	2.9	3.9	8.3	15.4	0.0
2022	84.1	2,281	5.1	44.0	2.1	5.6	2.4	4.4	10.3	24.9	0.0

Blocs

This lists the relative strength of the socialist and centre-right blocs since 1973, but parties not elected to the Riksdag are inserted as "other", including the Sweden Democrats results from 1988 to 2006, but also the Christian Democrats pre-1991 and the Greens in 1982, 1985 and 1991. The sources are identical to the table above. The coalition or government mandate marked in bold formed the government after the election. New Democracy got elected in 1991 but are still listed as "other" due to the short lifespan of the party. "Elected" is the total number of percentage points from the municipality that went to parties who were elected to the Riksdag.

Year	Turnout	Votes	Left	Right	SD	Other	Elected
1973	94.6	3,933	**72.4**	26.0	0.0	1.6	98.4
1976	94.4	3,978	70.7	**28.5**	0.0	0.8	99.2
1979	94.2	3,871	72.2	**27.0**	0.0	0.8	99.2
1982	93.5	3,758	**74.0**	24.0	0.0	2.0	98.0
1985	90.6	3,599	**73.6**	25.3	0.0	1.1	98.9
1988	88.8	3,412	**77.2**	21.3	0.0	1.5	98.5
1991	88.2	3,326	69.1	**25.1**	0.0	5.8	97.4
1994	88.2	3,275	**77.2**	21.4	0.0	1.4	98.6
1998	81.3	2,798	**75.8**	22.8	0.0	1.4	98.6
2002	80.4	2,576	**71.7**	25.6	0.0	2.7	97.3
2006	80.7	2,492	67.3	**27.4**	0.0	5.3	94.7
2010	83.9	2,484	65.3	**27.9**	4.9	1.9	98.1
2014	85.1	2,463	**64.8**	21.4	11.4	2.4	97.6
