= The Beggars (film) =

1962 film

- Directed by: Flávio Migliaccio
- Written by: Flávio Migliaccio
- Produced by: João Elias Ribeiro
- Starring: Vanja Orico
- Cinematography: Afonso Viana
- Release date: 1962
- Running time: 82 minutes
- Country: Brazil
- Language: Portuguese

The Beggars (Portuguese: Os Mendigos) is a 1962 Brazilian drama film directed by Flávio Migliaccio. It was entered into the 3rd Moscow International Film Festival.

== Cast ==
- Vanja Orico
- Oswaldo Loureiro
- Ruy Guerra
- Fábio Sabag
