= Carlos Blanco (writer) =

Spanish writer, academic, and former child prodigy

Carlos Alberto Blanco Pérez (born 7 March 1986 in Madrid) is a Spanish writer, academic and former child prodigy.

He is the author of "Conciencia y Mismidad", "Athanasius" and "La integración del conocimiento". In 2015 he was elected to the World Academy of Art and Science. and he is a member of the European Academy of Sciences and Arts.

== Biography ==
Carlos Blanco began to speak when he was seven months old and by age two he learned to read. At eight he started to learn ancient languages, studying on his own Egyptian. He attended local state school in Coslada, "C.P. Pablo Neruda". In 1997, when he was eleven years old, he was admitted to the Spanish Association of Egyptology.

In May 1998, after getting the highest mark in the course on Egyptian hieroglyphs offered by the Spanish Association of Egyptology, he was regarded as the youngest Egyptologist in Europe and the youngest hieroglyphs decipherer in the world by the Spanish newspaper El Mundo, and by age 12 he was named honorary member of "Fundación Arqueológica Clos" (Barcelona), giving his first lectures at "Museo Egipcio" in Barcelona. He was also invited to visit Egypt by the Egyptian Government and he was awarded a scholarship to study Arabic at "Instituto Egipcio de Estudios Islámicos" (Madrid).

In 1999 he became popular in Spain for his interventions at Crónicas marcianas, one of the leading TV programs of the moment, where under the label of "superdotado" (in Spanish, name referring to highly gifted children) he spoke about science, philosophy, history and politics every week. He was invited for a second time to Egypt, where he was interviewed for "Good Evening, Egypt", and he went to Argentina, where he was interviewed by Samuel “Chiche” Gelblung in Buenos Aires.

In 2000 he got a scholarship to study at Westminster School, London, where he was interested in Russian, Chinese and Greek. In 2001 he was given a grant to attend lessons at University of Navarra (Spain). He took three degrees ("licenciaturas") at the same time: Philosophy (M.A. 2006), Chemistry (M.Sc.2007) and Theology (M.A.2007), continuing his studies on Russian and Chinese.

Blanco has been a member of the International Association of Egyptologists, "Sociedad Española Leibniz" and Asociación Española de Superdotados y con Talento.

As of 2009, he studies as a visiting fellow in the Committee on the Study of Religion at Harvard University. As of 2011, he holds two doctorates: Philosophy and Theology. He is a faculty member of the Pontifical University of Comillas, a Jesuit institution in Madrid, where he teaches philosophy, and he is a founding member of The Altius Society, a global association of young leaders which organizes an annual conference at Oxford University. In 2025, he became the first documented philosopher to have a dialogue with his digital clon, discussing philosophical and scientific questions.

== Works ==
- “Disco de Phaistos: Investigaciones para una traducción bajo un punto de vista gramático e histórico” (Coslada, diciembre de 1998; registro de la propiedad intellectual 80716, 16/02/99).
- El nacimiento de la civilización egipcia (Coslada, 1999)
- "Estudio comparativo entre el desciframiento de las escrituras jeroglíficas egipcia y maya”, lecture read at the Egyptian Museum of Barcelona (September 2001)
- "El Éxodo: aspectos literarios, arqueológicos y teológicos” (Coslada, diciembre 2003; Estudios Bíblicos vol. LXII, cuad. 3).
- “Leibniz y la teoría de la relación” Thémata n. 34, 2005.
- “El concepto de creación en la teología menfita” (Coslada, 2005)
- Why Resurrection? An Introduction to the Belief in the Afterlife in Judaism and Christianity (Pickwick, 2011)
- Philosophy and Salvation. An Essay on Wisdom, Beauty, and Love as the Goal of Life (Pickwick 2012)
- Filosofía, Teología y el Sentido de la Historia (Fundación José Antonio de Castro, 2011)
- God, the future, and the fundamentum of history in Wolfhart Pannenberg
- Conciencia y Mismidad (Dykinson, 2013)
- El Pensamiento de la Apocalíptica Judía (Trotta, 2013)
- Leonardo da Vinci o la Tragedia de la Perfección (De Buena Tinta 2015)
- Grandes Problemas Filosóficos (Síntesis 2015)
- The Integration of Knowledge
- Athanasius (DidacBook 2016), ISBN 978-84-15969-66-2
- The role of presuppositions in the social sciences
- La integración del conocimiento (Evohé 2018), ISBN 978-84-9483-070-9
