= 2015 in comics =

Notable events of 2015 in comics. It includes any relevant comics-related events, deaths of notable comics-related people, conventions and first issues by title. For an overview of the year in Japanese comics, see 2015 in manga.

== Events ==
=== January ===
- January 7: Charlie Hebdo shooting: In Paris, terrorists invade the office of the French satirical magazine Charlie Hebdo and murder 12 people, injuring 11. Among the cartoonists murdered that morning are Cabu, Charb, Philippe Honoré, Tignous and Georges Wolinski. The shooting brings about a huge rally of national unity under the name Je suis Charlie. Two days later, the assassins are shot by the police.
- January 23: An original The Adventures of Tintin cover for The Shooting Star is auctioned and sold for €2.5 million ($2.854 million) at the Brussels Antiques and Art Fair.

=== March ===
- March 4:
  - American Gothic Press is founded.
  - Ken Bald makes the Guinness Book of Records as the oldest active comics artist in the world. He would break this record again on 8 May 2017.
- March 7–8: During the Stripdagen in Gorinchem, Marcel Ruijters wins the Stripschapprijs. The Dutch comics magazine Tina wins the P. Hans Frankfurtherprijs. Thom Roep wins the Bulletje en Boonestaakschaal.

=== April ===
- April 1: Taylor Robins' webcomic Never Satisfied makes its debut.
- April 20: The 533th issue of Mad Magazine is guest-edited by "Weird Al" Yankovic and Patton Oswalt.

=== May ===
- May 3: The final episode of the long-running comic panel Grin and Bear It, originally created by George Lichty, is published.

=== June ===
- June 9: Hergé's estate Moulinsart loses the court case against a Dutch Tintin fanclub, Hergé Society, because the court rules that the rights to the character are not theirs, but belong to Casterman.
- June 20: The first chapter of the long-awaited sequel to the Dragon Ball series Dragon Ball Super is published.

=== July ===
- July 17: Belgian comic writer Jean Van Hamme is knighted.

=== September ===
- September 8: Zep makes a special Titeuf comic in which the cast members becomes victims of warfare and become refugees, to provide commentary on the war refugee crisis.
- September 23: Joep Bertrams wins his second Inktspotprijs for Best Political Cartoon.

=== October ===
- October 6: A rare drawing of the Tintin story The Blue Lotus is auctioned and sold for over 1 million dollars.
- October 16: Suske en Wiske receive a comics mural in Antwerp, Belgium.
- October 27: Two pages from the Tintin story King Ottokar's Sceptre are auctioned and sell for €1.56 million ($1.7 million).

=== November ===
- November 2: Snoopy receives a star on the Hollywood Walk of Fame.
- November 7: The final episode of Larry Wright's Kit 'n' Carlyle appears in print.
- November 13: In Paris terrorist attacks take place at the Bataclan concert hall. One of the people to witness this tragic events at the theater is cartoonist Fred Dewilde, who adapted the experience into the graphic novel Mon Bataclan in 2016.
- November 22: The final episode of the long-running comics series Apartment 3-G, originally created by Nicholas P. Dallis and Alex Kotzky, is published.

=== Specific date unknown ===
- Dutch illustrator Cor Blok releases his graphic novel The Iron Parachute at age 82, making him the second oldest man at that time to ever debut as a comics author.
- Anton Martin of the design agency Power & Glory releases a comic strip based on the lyrics of the song Badaboum by Hooverphonic.

== Deaths ==
=== January ===
- January 7: Charlie Hebdo shooting:
  - Charb (Stéphane Charbonnier), French cartoonist and editor-in-chief, killed at age 47.
  - Cabu (Jean Cabut), French cartoonist (Le Grand Duduche), killed at age 76.
  - Philippe Honoré, French cartoonist, killed at age 73.
  - Tignous (Bernard Verlhac), French cartoonist, killed at age 57.
  - Georges Wolinski, French cartoonist (Paulette), killed at age 80.
- January 13:
  - Ulli Bürer, Dutch comics artist and illustrator (Six Inch Stiletto's), dies at age 49.
  - José Luis Moro, Spanish animator and comics artist (Hazañas del ratoncito Lepi, Roechapas, El Abuelo Jonás, Tip y Top), dies at age 88.
- January 20: Peter Pontiac, Dutch underground comics artist, illustrator and letterer (The Amsterdam Connection, Kraut), dies from liver disease at age 63.
- January 26: R. K. Laxman, Indian comics artist (The Common Man, You Said It), dies at age 93.

=== February ===
- February 3: Géri, Belgian comics artist (Skblllz, Mr. Magellan), dies at age 80.
- February 4: Roland Garel, French comics artist (Galax, Les 4 As, Jack et Minuit, Chère Pauline, Les Pionniers de l'Impossible), dies at age 84 or 85.
- February 4: Dick Millington, British comics artist (Mighty Moth, I Don't Believe It) and writer (The Telegoons, Barney Bear), dies at age 81.
- February 6: Jacques Kamb, French comics writer (Teddy Ted) and artist (Le Mousquetaire Pardaran, Zor et Mlouf, Couik, Zup, Dicentim), dies at age 81.
- February 7: Ugurcan Yüce, Turkish painter, illustrator and comics artist, dies at age 68.
- February 9: Lucia Steinbach, Dutch illustrator and comic artist (Tim Toeter Bij De Muziek), dies at age 92.
- February 16: Brett Ewins, British comic book artist (worked for the magazines 2000 AD and Deadline magazine), dies at age 59
- February 19: Talus Taylor, French novelist (co-creator of Barbapapa), dies at the age of 82.
- February 20: Gérard Calvi, French composer (composed music for the Astérix animated feature films), dies at age 92.

=== March ===
- March 7: Yoshihiro Tatsumi, Japanese manga artist (Black Blizzard), credited with starting the gekiga style of alternative comics in Japan, dies from lung cancer at age 79.
- March 8: Göte Göransson, Swedish comics artist (Texas Jim, Tiger Lasse, comics based on Biggles), dies at age 94.
- March 9: Lou Silverstone, American TV and comics writer (Mad Magazine, Cracked), dies at age 90.
- March 13: Irwin Hasen, American comics artist (Dondi), dies at age 96.
- March 18: Roy Doty, American comics artist (Wordless Workshop), dies at age 92.
- March 20: Jim Berry, American comics artist (Berry's World) and comic writer (Benjy), dies at age 83.
- March 22: Tom Koch, American comics writer (Mad Magazine), dies at age 89.
- March 29: Jim Whiting, American comic artist (Ad Libs, 'Vincent the Magician, continued Li'l Ones), dies at age 88.
- March 30: Roger Slifer, American comics writer (The Omega Men and co-creator of Lobo), dies at age 60 from the effects of a 2012 hit-and-run accident.

=== April ===
- April 1: Cynthia Powell, AKA Cynthia Lennon, British graphic artist and painter (made comic-like drawings for her autobiographical book A Twist of Lennon), dies at age 75.
- April 6: Cliff Voorhees, American animator and comics artist (continued The Toodles, Disney comics, Hanna-Barbera comics, Walter Lantz comics), dies at age 85.
- April 10: Jordi Macabich, Spanish comic artist (Aunque le Cueste Creelo, Dígame vd., El Inspector Dan), dies at age 89 or 90.
- April 13:
  - Dexter Taylor, American comics writer and artist (Archie Comics, Little Archie), dies at age 84.
  - Herb Trimpe, American comics artist (continued The Incredible Hulk), dies at age 75.
- April 14: Kō Kojima, Japanese manga artist (Sennin Buraku), dies at age 87.
- April 25: Marcel Steurbaut, Belgian comics artist (Pedro en Margino, assisted on Bessy), dies at age 82.
- April 23: Sixto Valencia Burgos, Mexican comic artist (continued Memín Pinguín), dies at age 81.

=== May ===
- May 7: John Dixon, Australian comics artist (Air Hawk and the Flying Doctors), dies at age 86.
- May 17: Robert Bressy, French comics artist (worked for Opera Mundi, Independent Associated Agency and made Disney comics), dies at age 90.
- May 30: Michele Wrightson (née Robinson), American underground cartoonist and superhero comic colorist, as well as the former wife of both Roger Brand and Bernie Wrightson, dies at age 73.

=== June ===
- June 19: Earl Norem, American magazine and comics illustrator known for his painted covers for Marvel Comics, dies at age 92.
- June 25: Fred Marcus, Dutch comics artist and illustrator (Het G.P.-mannetje, Joris en Jopie, Uit Het Barre Leven van Barend Buskruit, Bengeltje), dies at age 91 or 92.
- June 26: Kája Saudek, Czech comics artist (Muriel a andělé, Muriel a oranžová smrt , Lips Tullian), dies at age 80.
- June 30:
  - Leonard Starr, American comics artist (Mary Perkins, On Stage, revived Little Orphan Annie), dies at age 89.
  - Paolo Piffarerio, Italian comics artist and animator (Viva l'Italia, Atomik, Maschera Nera, El Gringo, Milord, Alan Ford), dies at age 90.

=== July ===
- July 16: Alan Kupperberg, American animator, comics writer and artist (Obnoxio the Clown vs. the X-Men, continued Howard the Duck and Little Orphan Annie), dies of thymus cancer at age 62.
- July 20: Tom Moore, American comics artist (Archie), dies at age 86.
- July 22: Stuf, Belgian comics artist (Passe-moi l'Ciel), dies at age 56 from a heart attack.
- July 31: Jean-Jacques Loup, French comics artist and caricaturist (worked for Fluide Glacial), dies at age 78 or 79.

=== August ===
- August 7: Art Finley, American radio and TV comedian, presenter and comics writer (Art's Gallery), dies from a heart attack at age 88 or 89.
- August 8: Coyote, French comics artist (Mammouth et Piston, Litteul Kévin), dies from cardiac arrest at age 52.
- August 11: Randy Glasbergen, American comics artist (The Better Half), dies from cardiac arrest at age 58.
- August 19: Emmanuel Ratier, A.K.A. Rémi, French essayist, editor, political activist and comic artist (Balder), dies at age 57.
- August 30:
  - Brad Anderson, American comics artist (Marmaduke), dies at age 91.
  - The Pizz, American illustrator, graphic designer and comics artist, commits suicide at age 57.

=== September ===
- September 13: Jay Scott Pike, American comics artist (Dolphin, co-creator of Jann of the Jungle), dies at age 91.
- September 26: Liliane Funcken, Belgian comics artist and writer (Le Chevalier Blanc, Harald le Viking, Jack Diamond, Lieutenant Burton, Capitan and Doc Silver), dies at 88.

=== October ===
- October 8: Dennis Eichhorn, American comics writer/editor (Real Stuff), dies of pneumonia at age 70.
- October 9: Tony Rafty, Australian caricaturist and comics artist (Jimmy Rodney of the Secret Service), dies at age 99.
- October 9: Zdravko Zupan, Serbian comics artist (Tom & Jerry comics, Disney comics) and comics journalist (founder of the fanzine Cepelin), dies at age 65.
- October 14: Vince Musacchia, American comics artist (created a comic book series based on The Honeymooners, Looney Tunes comics, Hanna-Barbera comic), dies at age 63.
- October 16: Angus McGill, Scottish columnist and comic writer (Clive (later retitled Augusta), dies at age 87.
- October 22: Murphy Anderson, American comics artist (Buck Rogers, Superman), dies at age 89.

=== November ===
- November 8: Félix Arburola Bustos, Costa Rican comics artist and children's book illustrator (Tricolín), dies at age 77 or 78 from lymphatic cancer.
- November 16: Ingvar Persson, Swedish comics artist (Frid och Fröjd, continued Agust och Lotta), dies at age 85.
- November 17: Henri Arnold, American comics artist (Bibs 'n' Tucker, This Man's Army, Meet Mr. Luckey), dies at age 91.
- November 28: Rosa Galcerán Vilanova, Spanish comics artist (Katy), editor and publisher (founder of the magazine Azucena), dies at age 98.
- November 30: Shigeru Mizuki, Japanese manga artist (GeGeGe no Kitarō), dies at age 93.

=== December ===
- December 11: Zyx, Canadian cartoonist and comics artist (Sombre Vilain), dies at age 65.
- December 12: Luis Bermejo, Spanish comics artist and illustrator (Apache, continued Heros the Spartan and Johnny Future), dies at age 84.
- December 13: Suzzy Bailleux, Belgian comic artist (part of the Ercola collective), dies at age 77.
- December 19: Jacques Rampal, French playwright, comic writer and artist (worked for the comic magazine Mormoil), dies at age 71.
- December 22: Carson Van Osten, American comics artist (Disney comics), dies at age 69.

=== Specific date unknown ===
- Jordi Macabich, Spanish comics artist (El Inspector Dan), dies at age 89 or 90.
- The Pizz (Stephen Pizzurro), American painter and comics artist (Rat Fink Comix), dies at age 56 or 57.

== Exhibitions ==
- May 14 – September 21: The Type Directors Club (New York City) — "The Super Type of Ira Schnapp", curated by Arlen Schumer

== Conventions ==
- January 29–31: Salt Lake Comic Con FanXperience (Salt Palace Convention Center, Salt Lake City, Utah) — guests include Matt Smith, Karen Gillan, Billie Piper, Carrie Fisher, Christopher Lloyd, Felicia Day, Tom Felton, Steven Yeun, Emily Kinney, Laurie Holden, Lena Headey, Nikolaj Coster-Waldau, Brandon Routh, Ray Park, Paul Wesley, Phoebe Tonkin, Nichelle Nichols, Anthony Michael Hall, Mark Pellegrino, Alaina Huffman, Ralph Macchio, Glenn Morshower, RJ Mitte, Jim Cummings, Jess Harnell, Rob Paulsen, and over 100 other guests
- January 29 – February 1: Angoulême International Comics Festival (Angoulême, France)
- March 7: New York Comic Book Marketplace (Penn Plaza Pavilion, New York City) — guests include Jason David Frank, "Rowdy" Roddy Piper, Jake "The Snake" Roberts, Rich Buckler, Bill Plympton, Bob Camp, and Johnny Brennan
- March 7–8: STAPLE! (Marchesa Hall and Theater, Austin, Texas)
- March 27–29: Emerald City Comicon (Washington State Convention Center, Seattle, Washington)
- March 28: Towson Black Comic Mini-Fest (Towson University Liberal Arts Building, Towson, Maryland)
- April 3–5: WonderCon (Anaheim Convention Center, Anaheim, California)
- April 10–12: MegaCon (Orange County Convention Center, Orlando, Florida)
- April 11: FLUKE Mini-Comics & Zine Festival (40 Watt, Athens, Georgia)
- April 11–12: MoCCA Arts Festival (Center 548, New York City) — guests of honor: Aline Kominsky-Crumb, Scott McCloud, Raina Telgemeier, and J. H. Williams III
- April 11–12: East Coast Comicon (Meadowlands Exposition Center, Meadowlands, New Jersey)
- April 24–26: C2E2 (McCormick Place Complex, Chicago, Illinois)
- May 3–10: San Francisco Comics Fest (San Francisco, California) — week-long series of events presented by the California College of the Arts, the Cartoon Art Museum, Academy of Art University and the San Francisco Public Library
- May 9–10: Toronto Comic Arts Festival (Toronto Reference Library, Toronto, Canada) — featured guests include Lucy Knisley, Matt Holm, Scott McCloud, Jennifer Holm, Ed Luce, and Hunt Emerson
- May 15–17: Motor City Comic Con (Suburban Collection Showplace, Novi, Michigan)
- May 16: East Coast Black Age of Comics Convention (Enterprise Center, Philadelphia, Pennsylvania)
- May 22–24: St. Louis Comicon (America's Center, St Louis, Missouri)
- May 28–31: Phoenix Comicon (Phoenix Convention Center, Phoenix, Arizona) — guests include Summer Glau, Jason Momoa, Paul Cornell, Mike Zeck, Edward James Olmos, Charisma Carpenter, Renee Witterstaetter, Sherrilyn Kenyon, Jim Beaver, William Tucci, Scott Sigler, Lou Ferrigno, Weston Ochse, Yvonne Navarro, Van Jensen, Michael Shanks, Alexis Denisof, Alyson Hannigan among others.
- May 29–31: Dallas Comic Con (Kay Bailey Hutchison Convention Center, Dallas, Texas) — guests include Stan Lee, Amanda Conner, Alex Maleev, Esad Ribić, Kaare Andrews, Greg Pak, Steve Epting, Jimmy Palmiotti, and Bob Layton
- June 6–7: Chicago Alternative Comics Expo [CAKE] (Center on Halsted, Chicago, Illinois) — special guests: Eleanor Davis, Gilbert Hernandez, Jaime Hernandez, Keiler Roberts, Zak Sally, Dash Shaw, Jillian Tamaki, Lale Westvind
- June 19–21: Heroes Convention (Charlotte Convention Center, Charlotte, North Carolina)
- July 9–12: San Diego Comic-Con (San Diego Convention Center, San Diego, California)
- July 18–19: Small Press and Alternative Comics Expo (Northland Performing Arts Center, Columbus, Ohio)
- August 20–23: Wizard World Chicago (Donald E. Stephens Convention Center, Rosemont, Illinois)
- September 4–7: Dragon*Con (Atlanta, Georgia)
- September 18–20: Wizard World Ohio Comic Con (Greater Columbus Convention Center, Columbus, Ohio)
- September 19–20: Small Press Expo (Bethesda North Marriott Hotel & Conference Center, North Bethesda, Maryland)
- September 20: CanalCon/Comica Comiket (Floating Cinema barge, Granary Square, Central Saint Martin’s College of Art and Design, London, England) — exhibitors include Rebellion Publishing, SelfMadeHero, Knockabout Comics, First Second Books, Soaring Penguin, Centrala Books, Escape Books; guests include Dave Gibbons
- September 25–27: Baltimore Comic-Con (Baltimore Convention Center, Baltimore, Maryland)
- October 1–3: Cartoon Crossroads Columbus (CXC) (Columbus, Ohio) — first annual event; featured guests include Jeff Smith, Kate Beaton, Art Spiegelman, Craig Thompson, Bill Griffith, Francoise Mouly, and animation historian Jerry Beck
- October 8–11: New York Comic Con (Jacob K. Javits Convention Center, New York City)
- October 17–18: Massachusetts Independent Comics Expo [MICE] (Lesley University, University Hall, Porter Square, Cambridge, Massachusetts) — guests include Jennifer Hayden, Lucy Knisley, Dustin Harbin, and Ryan North
- October 31 – November 2: Comikaze Expo (Los Angeles Convention Center) — scheduled guests include Stan Lee, Elvira, Kevin Smith, Kevin Conroy, Burt Ward, Gwendoline Christie, Alfie Allen, Stephen Moyer, Kristin Bauer, Barbara Eden, Mindy Sterling, John Barrowman, Jewel Staite, Tara Strong, Howie Mandel, James Hong, Eric Roberts, Original Power Rangers (David Yost and Walter Emanuel Jones), Cast of AMC's Comic Book Men (Bryan Johnson, Mike Zapcic, Ming Chen, Robert Bruce), and Tommy Wiseau
- November 6–8: Rhode Island Comic Con (Rhode Island Convention Center, Providence, Rhode Island)
- November 7–8: Comic Arts Brooklyn [CAB] (Our Lady of Mt. Carmel Church & Wythe Hotel, Brooklyn, New York)
- December 5–6: NY Winter Comic & Sci-Fi Expo (Resorts World Casino, Jamaica, New York)
- December 5–6: Comic Arts Los Angeles (Think Tank Gallery, Los Angeles, California) — featured guests: Jaime Hernandez, ND Stevenson

== First issues by title ==
Accelerators: Momentum
Release: May 20 by Blue Juice Comics. Writer: R. F. I. Porto Artist: Gavin Smith

Arcadia
Release: May 6 by Boom! Studios. Writer: Alex Paknadel Artist: Eric Scott Pfeiffer

Archie vs. Predator
Release: March 25 by Archie Comics with Dark Horse Comics. Writer: Alex de Campi Artist: Fernando Ruiz

Convergence
Release: April 1 by DC Comics. Writer: Jeff F. King Artists: Ethan Van Sciver, Jason Paz, & Carlo Pagulayan

The Grievous Journey of Ichabod Azrael (and the Dead Left in His Wake)
Release: February 25 by Rebellion Developments/2000AD. Writer: Rob Williams Artist: Dom Reardon

Harrow County
Release: May by Dark Horse. Writer: Cullen Bunn Artist: Tyler Crook

Hellbreak
Release: by Oni Press. Writer: Cullen Bunn Artist: Brian Churilla

Invader Zim
Release: July 8 by Oni Press. Writers: Jhonen Vasquez & Eric Trueheart Artist: Aaron Alexovich, Dave Crosland & Warren Wucunich

Invisible Republic
Release: March 18 by Image Comics. Writers: Corrina Bechko & Gabriel Hardman Artist: Gabriel Hardman

James Bond 007
Release: November by Dynamite Entertainment. Writer: Warren Ellis Artist: Jason Masters

King Tiger
Release: August 12 by Dark Horse Comics. Writer: Randy Stradley Artist: Doug Wheatley

Metal Locus
Release: April 22 by Cosmic Times. Writer: Stephan Nilson Artist: Larry Watts

Pastaways
Release: March 25 by Dark Horse Comics. Writer: Matt Kindt Artist: Scott Kolins

Pisces
Release: April 29 by Image Comics. Writer: Kurtis J. Wiebe Artist: Johnnie Christmas

Postal
Release: February 4 by Top Cow. Writer: Matt Hawkins Artist: Bryan Hill
Resident Alien: The Sam Hain Mystery
Release: April by Dark Horse. Writer: Peter Hogan Artist: Steve Parkhouse
Reyn
Release: January 21 by Image Comics. Writer: Kel Symons Artist: Nathan Stockman

Secret Wars
Release: May 6 by Marvel Comics. Writer: Jonathan Hickman Artist: Esad Ribic

Sons of the devil
Release: May by Image Comics. Writer: Brian Buccellato Artist: Toni Infante

Star Wars
Release: January 14 by Marvel Comics. Writer: Jason Aaron Artist: John Cassaday

Surface Tension
Release: May 27 by Titan Comics. Writer and Artist: Jay Gunn

Tokyo Ghost
Release: September 16 by Image Comics. Writer: Rick Remender Artist: Sean Murphy

The Violent
Release: December by Image Comics. Writer: Ed Brisson Artist: Adam Gorham
