= Muriel a oranžová smrt =

1969-70 comic album by Miloš Macourek and Kája Saudek

Among other things, Kája Saudek sought an inspiration in the art works of the past.

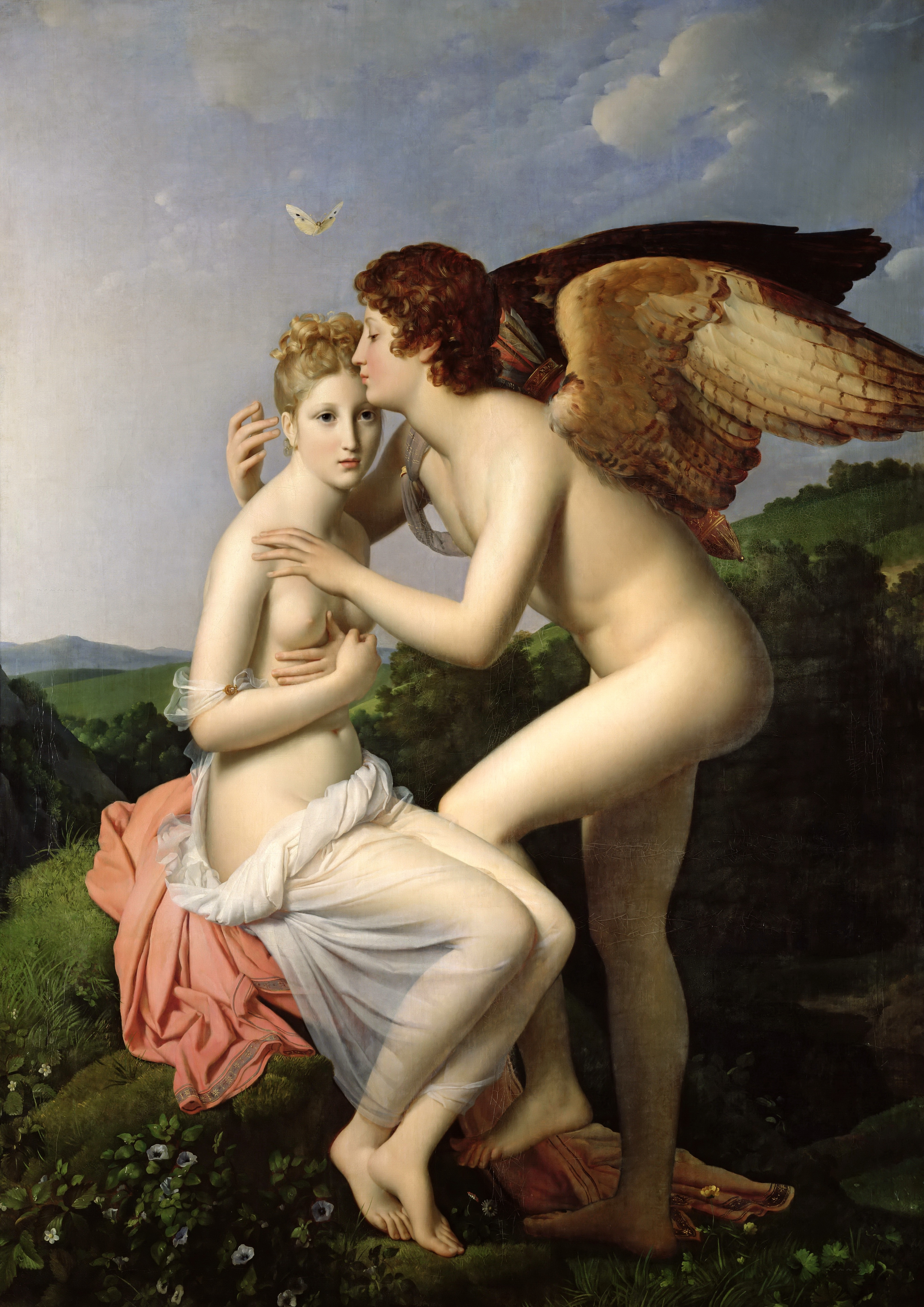
One of the drawings for the album Muriel a oranžová smrt was inspired by the painting Cupid and Psyche (1798) by François Gérard.

Muriel a oranžová smrt (in English: Muriel and the Orange Death) is a Czech comic album written by Miloš Macourek and drawn by Kája Saudek in 1969/1970. The story was inspired by the Warsaw Pact invasion of Czechoslovakia in 1968. The album is the second and the last part of the planned cycle of adventures of young physician Muriel and her friend, angel Ró. It is considered one of the masterpieces of Czech comics. The 1st edition of the album was published in 2009, forty years after its creation, and sold out in four days.

== Background ==
Kája Saudek and Miloš Macourek first worked together in the early 1960s, as filmmakers. Inspired by the French Barbarella comic-book series, they began work on a cycle of graphic novels that featured a young, beautiful woman and a winged man (an 'angel'). The first installment, Muriel a andělé (Muriel and Angels), was announced in 1969, but not published until 1991. While the second installment was being planned, Warsaw Pact forces invaded Czechoslovakia, in August 1968, and occupied the country, ending the Prague Spring liberalization period, and bringing about a restructure of the Czechoslovak communist regime. Faced with official repression and censorship, Czech authors, filmmakers and musicians reacted with a spate of ingeniously subversive new works: Macourek was no exception, and wove his own experience and opinions of Czechoslovakia's occupation into a new installment of Muriel's adventures. In the tightened communist censorship of the period, both installments met with official disapproval. Under the "normalization" of Czech society, comics - and particularly Saudek's - were considered bourgeois propaganda. Muriel a oranžová smrt was a flagrant satire against central communist authority.

== Plot ==
Muriel a oranžová smrt follows its characters on from where Muriel a andělé left them. The militaristic General Xeron, the main antagonist, has managed to escape justice. Both Muriel and Xeron are captured by a spy from the Orange Planet. Once at the Orange Planet, Muriel is imprisoned, but Xeron, true to character, unhesitatingly joins its autocratic ruling regime, and persuades its leader, the Central Brain, to invade Earth. After a brief, hopeless resistance, Earth is defeated; but Muriel's boyfriend Ró (a visitor from an alien planet of the distant future) contacts his compatriots and allies, and together, they drive the invaders back. Ró journeys to the Orange Planet, destroys its Central Brain, frees Muriel, and liberates the Planet's ordinary inhabitants, who have been unknowingly enslaved all the while.

== Symbolism ==
The Orange Planet reflects a prevalent Czechoslovak viewpoint on Soviet life during the 1960s: its men are depicted as ugly, malformed orange monsters, who serve a life of comfortable routine in the Planet's enormous army. Its women live a life of drudgery, at the service of heavy labour and heavy industry. The Planet is controlled by a dictator (The Central Brain) who brainwashes its inhabitants into obedience by means of implanted radio antennae. Saudek depicts the women with his characteristic sense of eroticism, usually half-naked and in sexually provocative poses. Czech comics expert Tomáš Prokůpek claims that this is probably the first Czech comic to depict naked female breasts. By 1970, it was ready for publication but in the atmosphere of Husakian "normalization", the publication of a comic whose main theme was an invasion of monsters from the Orange Planet invited "political suicide".

Despite the restrictions of "normalisation", Macourek and Saudek continued their collaboration, mingling film and comic-book artistic conventions. Saudek designed the 1970 film production Čtyři vraždy stačí, drahoušku (Four Murders is Enough, Honey: screenplay by Macourek); the film employed graphic elements from a comic book developed in tandem. The influence of Muriel and the Orange Death is apparent in Saudek's next work, the comic album Lips Tullian. Eventually, this too was banned. Muriel a oranžová smrt was published only in 2009, two years after Saudek suffered an accident and fell into a coma, and forty years after its creation. It sold out in four days, and is considered one of the masterpieces of Czech comics.

== Style ==
Saudek employs visual techniques that were unusually inventive for their day, derived from film editing and story-boarding, with heightened and wide-screen perspectives, recurrent motifs and a strong narrative style. Leading characters are based on real-life models: Muriel herself was based on the Czech film star Olga Schoberová (Saudek's former fiancée), and her antagonist, the militant general Ian Xeron, on Saudek's twin brother, the photographer Jan Saudek. A character called Nurse Haney is based on Saudek's wife, Hana. Other minor characters are taken from Western comic-books; Archie Andrews, Jughead Jones, Alfred E. Neuman and Batman inhabit Muriel's world, which is rich with in-jokes, double entendres and hidden meanings, typical of Saudek's work.
