= Kája Saudek =

Czech comics illustrator and graphic artist (1935–2015)

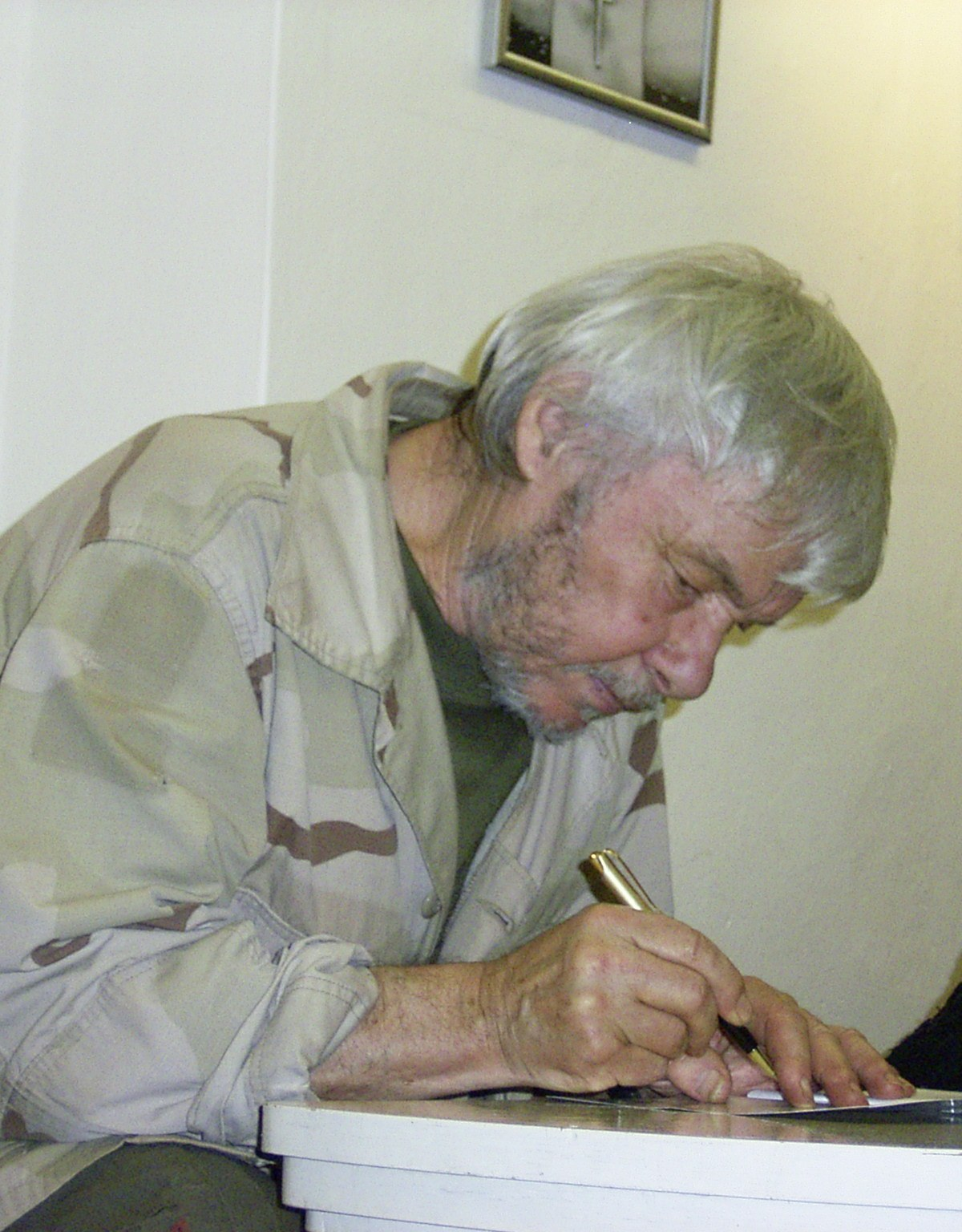
- Kája Saudek in 2006
- Born: Karel Saudek; 13 May 1935 Prague, Czechoslovakia
- Died: 25 June 2015 (aged 80) Prague, Czech Republic
- Areas: Writer, penciller, inker

Kája Saudek (born Karel Saudek; 13 May 1935 – 26 June 2015) was a Czech comics illustrator and graphic artist. He was considered one of the best artists of Czech comics. He has been called the "King of Czech comic books". His twin brother Jan Saudek is an internationally known photographer and painter.

== Biography ==
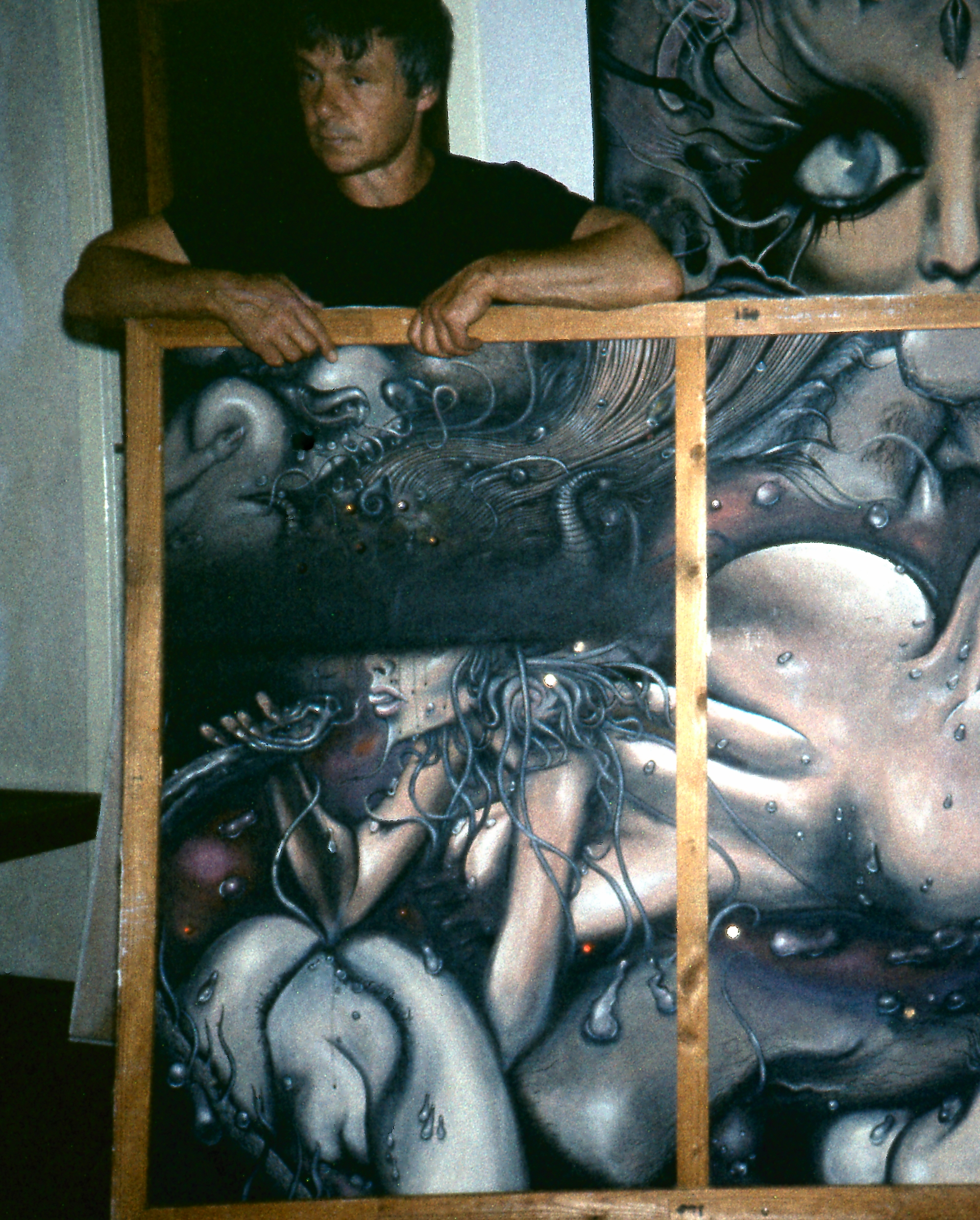
Kája Saudek in his atelier in the mid-1980s

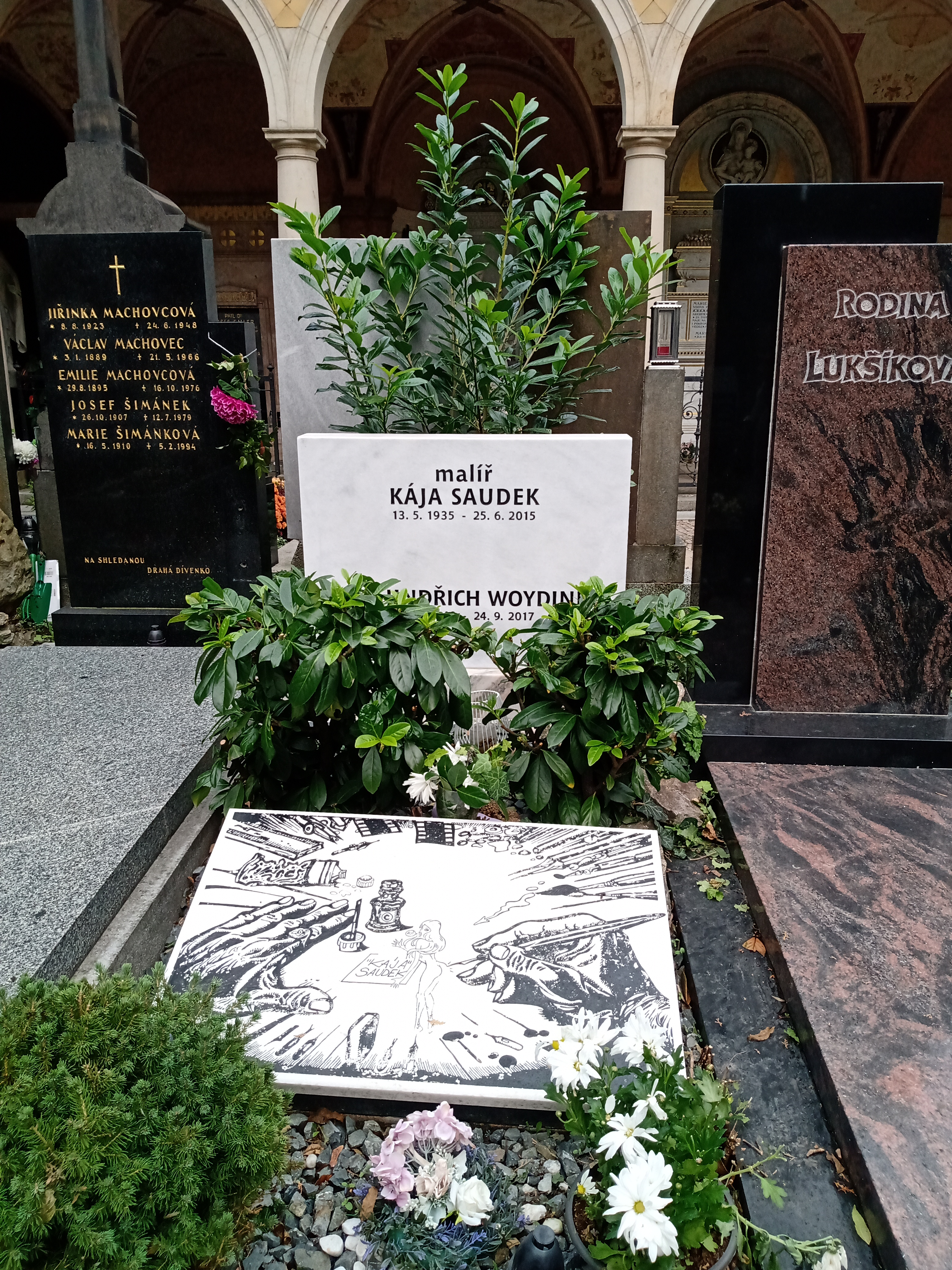
Grave of Kája Saudek at Vyšehrad Cemetery

Karel and Jan Saudek were born in Prague in 1935, twin sons of Gustav Saudek, who was Jewish, and his Czech wife. Both of their families originated in Bohemia; Gustav was born in Děčín. After the Nazis invaded Czechoslovakia during World War II, the family was subject to the racial persecution by the Nazis. Kája and his brother Jan were imprisoned with other Mischlinge (mixed-blood) children in the Nazi concentration camp Luža in German occupied Poland. Many of their Jewish family members died in the Theresienstadt concentration camp, where their father was deported in February 1945, but both brothers and their father survived.

Saudek had become familiar with American comics in his early years. He was first inspired mainly by the works of Walt Disney. After the war, as the Communists dominated government and society behind the Iron Curtain, enforced by the Soviet Union, Saudek was also influenced by American artists Robert Crumb and Richard Corben. He became a technical writer and in 1950s worked as a scene-shifter at the Barrandov Studios.

There he met the actress Olga Schoberová and featured her as a model of his comic character "sexy Jessie", who became one of his best known characters. He and Olga dated for a time. In 1966, the film director Miloš Macourek used Saudek's comic drawings in the film (Who Wants to Kill Jessie?), which featured Schoberová as Jessie. During his work on this film, Saudek met his future wife Hana.

Saudek's works became increasingly popular in the Czechoslovakia. In the 1960s he created comics drawings for the magazine Popmusic Express (Underground Com-comix), as well as illustrations to the scripts by Jaroslav Foglar, Ondřej Neff and others. He was influential in the expanding popular culture of the country.

Saudek drew from family and friends in creating his comic characters. In 1969 he published a part of the comic series Muriel a andělé (Muriel and Angels). The album depicts the story of a young physician Muriel, who meets an angel Ro, coming from a distant future. Ro attempts to introduce her to a world without hate, evil people, or death. (He modeled Muriel on actress Olga Schoberová and used his brother Jan for the antagonist general Xenon.) The communist censors believed the story to be politically suspect and banned its publication. Saudek's style was considered to be too "American"; some of his critics labelled his work as an example of bourgeois kitsch. The complete cycle of Muriel was published in 1991, after the change in governments. In 1971 Saudek contributed to the film Čtyři vraždy stačí, drahoušku (Four Murders is enough, Honey) with his comic drawings.

At the beginning of the 1970s, Saudek worked as an illustrator for the Czechoslovak magazine Mladý svět. His series Lips Tullian, inspired by 19th-century adventure stories, was banned by the party censors. They began to be more critical of Saudek's collaboration with the popular magazine, gradually restricting his work, and banning it altogether in the mid-1970s. From 1976 to 1978, Saudek created a comics series to the theme of Thirty Cases of Major Zeman, a popular Czechoslovak action-drama television series. The original TV series was intended as political propaganda to support official communist positions. The Ministry of Interior rejected Saudek's adaptation and refused to allow publication, because the officials thought that the style seemed too "American" and there was too much "shooting" in it. In 1999, after the fall of the Soviet Union, the album was published under the title Major Zeman and Six of His Cases.

In 1979, Saudek began his collaboration with the Czech Speleological Society; the society sponsored publication of several of his comics series in the following decade. In the 1980s Saudek also co-created a popular TV series, Okna vesmíru dokořán, together with Vladimír Železný and Jiří Grygar. The series was produced by the Slovak Television.

At the beginning of the 1990s, following the fall of the communist regime in Czechoslovakia, many of Saudek's works were published in new editions. He collaborated with the comics journal Kometa (The Comet) and also with the erotic magazine NEI Report.

Saudek continued his work. But in April 2006 he suffered a bad accident that left him in a coma. He was hospitalised in the Prague hospital Motol, and died on 26 June 2015. He was buried at Prague's Vyšehrad Cemetery and his grave was decorated with his drawing.

In September 2009, three of his works ranked among the top five of Czech comics in a poll organized by the newspaper Mladá fronta DNES.

== Works ==
=== Film ===
- Kdo chce zabít Jessii? (Who Wants to Kill Jessie?) (poster and fictional comics in the film)
- Čtyři vraždy stačí, drahoušku (Four Murders is enough, Honey) (animated scenes, fictional comics)
- Okna vesmíru dokořán (illustrations)

=== Comics ===
- Honza Hrom (1968) – 7 parts, own script, published in the Pop Music Express magazine)
- Pepík-Hipík (1969) – 4 parts, script by Rudolf Křesťan, Karel Hvížďala, Karel Šmíd, published in the Čtení pod lavicí magazine)
- Muriel a andělé (Muriel and Angels) (1969) – published in 1991, script by Miloš Macourek
- Muriel a oranžová smrt (Muriel and the Orange Death) (1970) – published in 2009 by Albatros, partially lost
- Čtverylka (1971) – 22 strips, script by Rudolf Křesťan, Haiduková, Tikalová, Pacovský, published in Mladý svět
- Výprava ze Sixie (Expedition from Sixia), (1971–72) – script by Miloš Polášek, published in the Ostravský Kulturní Zpravodaj
- Lips Tullian, nejobávanější náčelník lupičů (Lips Tullian, the Most Redoubtable Leader of Bandits) (1972) published in Mladý svět
- Diamantová šifra (The Diamond Code) (1972) – unfinished, 12 parts, script by Svatopluk Novotný, published in Mladá Fronta
- Fantom opery uvádí (Phantom of the Opera Presents) (1973) – published in Mladý svět
- Černý Filip (Black Phillip) (1974) – script by Jaroslav Weigel, published in Mladý svět
- Major Zeman (1978–1979) – script by Jaroslav Weigel, published in Pionýrská stezka
- Tajemství zlatého koně (The Secret of the Golden Horse) (1979), own script, published by Czech Speleological Society
- Po stopách sněžného muže (1980) – script by Josef Nesvadba, published by Czech Speleological Society
- Trať se ztrácí ve tmě (1980) – published by Czech Speleological Society
- Stříbrný poklad (Silver Treasure) (1982) – script by J.Weigel, published by Czech Speleological Society
- Studňa (The Well) (1984) – published in Film a Divadlo)
- Modrá rokle (The Blue Ravine) (1984) – script by Jaroslav Foglar, published by Czech Speleological Society
- Peruánský deník (Peruvian Diary) (1984) – published by Czech Speleological Society
- Konec Sahrbergovy bandy (The End of the Sahrberg Bunch) (1985) – published by Czech Speleological Society
- Ztracený kamarád (The Lost Friend) (1987) – script by Jaroslav Foglar, published by Czech Speleological Society
- Arnal a dva dračí zuby (Arnal and Two Dragon Teeth) (1988) – script by Ondřej Neff, published by Czech Speleological Society
- Jeskyně Saturn (The Saturn Cave) (1990–1991) – script by J. Foglar, published by Czech Speleological Society

=== Selected exhibitions ===
Saudek exhibited his works at more than 300 solo exhibitions in the Czechoslovakia and abroad. His drawings are included in significant Czech art collections (i. e. Moravian Gallery in Brno).

- 1997 – Konstanz, Rosengarten Museum. "Czech Posters of the '60s from the Collections of the Moravian Gallery Brno"
- 2002 – Prague, Czech Museum of Visual Arts. "Czech Comics (?) and Visual Arts"
- 2003 – Prague, Mánes. "Film Poster"
- 2009 - Prague, Czech Center. Kaja Saudek and '60s (Nov. 2009-Jan. 2010)
