= Miloš Macourek =

Czech screenwriter and writer (1926–2002)

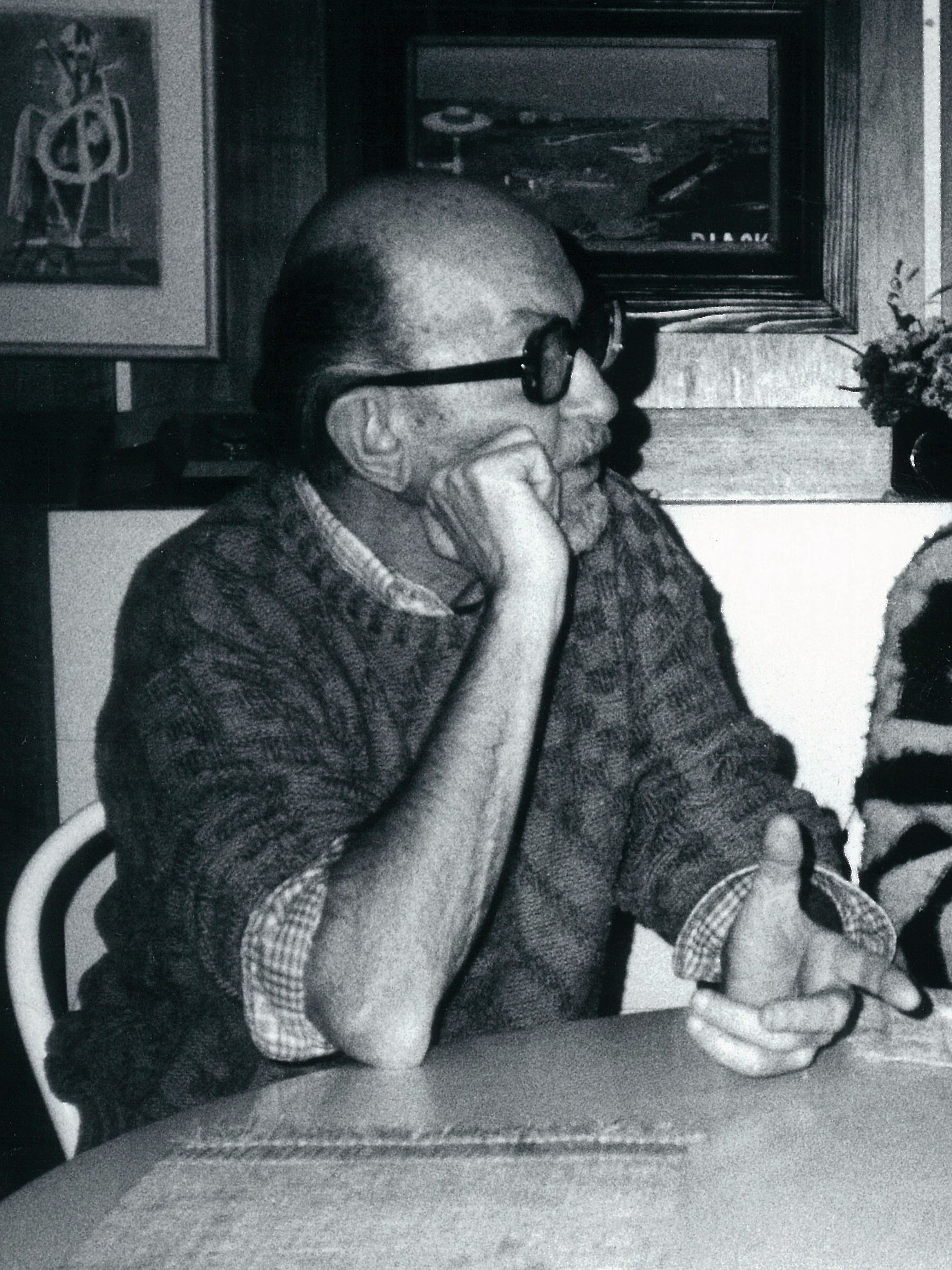
- Miloš Macourek in 1990
- Born: 2 December 1926; Kroměříž, Czechoslovakia
- Died: 30 September 2002 (aged 75); Prague, Czech Republic
- Occupations: Screenwriter, writer
- Writing career
- Notable works: The Girl on the Broomstick; Mach a Šebestová; Arabela

Miloš Macourek (2 December 1926 – 30 September 2002) was a Czech screenwriter and writer. Early in his career, he also wrote poems and plays. He was valued for his great imagination and sense of humor. He is known primarily for his books and films for children and for film comedies.

== Biography ==
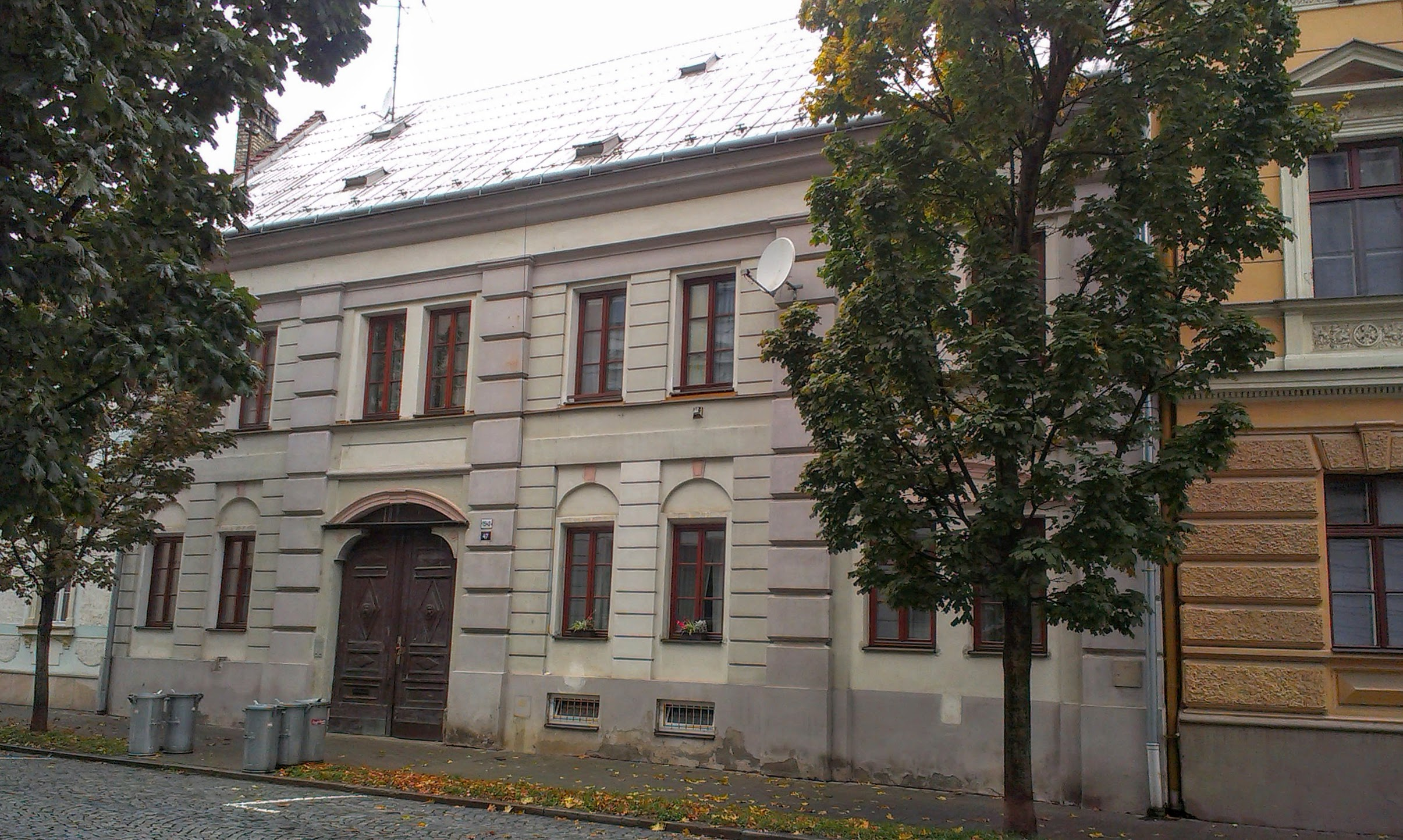
Birthplace of Miloš Macourek in Kroměříž

Miloš Macourek was born on 2 December 1926 in Kroměříž, Czechoslovakia, when his mother came to visit his grandmother. However, thanks to visits to his grandmother, he spent a large part of his childhood in this town. He was born into a lawyer's family. He studied at the gymnasium in Místek in 1939–1941, but the gymnasium was closed by the Nazis. After the war, he continued his studies, but in 1946 he left for Prague and tried various jobs. Because of his unfinished studies, he was called the black sheep of his family.

From 1946, Macourek regularly contributed to magazines. He completed his military service in 1948–1950, then he worked for the Central Council of Trade Unions. From 1954, he worked as a lecturer in the Department of History of Literature and Art at the Central School of Trade Unions. From 1959, he cooperated with the Theatre on the Balustrade. In 1960, he was employed as a dramaturgist at the Barrandov Film Studios, and from 1963 he continued there as a screenwriter. From 1980, he worked as a freelancer.

Macourek died after a long illness on 30 September 2002 in Prague.

== Career ==
Macourek was valued for his great imagination, sense of humor and exaggeration. The largest part of his work consists of children's books, TV series for children and film comedies. In the early days of his career, he wrote poems. He was compared to the French poet Jacques Prévert, whom he translated into Czech. In 1962, together with Václav Havel, he wrote the play Nejlepší rocky paní Hermanové for the Theatre on the Balustrade and definitively moved away from serious art.

His works have been translated into several languages and have won many awards. As a screenwriter, he most often collaborated with directors Václav Vorlíček and Oldřich Lipský, both of them also contributing to the screenplay. With both of them he made many comedies that belong to the golden fund of Czech cinematography, but he made the most successful films with Vorlíček. Their first film Who Wants to Kill Jessie? (1966) won the main award at the Trieste Film Festival.

Macourek also wrote scripts for cartoons and collaborated with the painter Adolf Born, with whom they made over 40 films. The most notable such work is Mach a Šebestová.

== Selected works ==
=== Film and TV screenplays ===
- Who Wants to Kill Jessie? (1966)
- Happy End (1967)
- The End of Agent W4C (1967)
- I Killed Einstein, Gentlemen (1969)
- Four Murders Are Enough, Darling (1971)
- You Are a Widow, Sir (1971)
- Straw Hat (1971)
- The Girl on the Broomstick (1972)
- Šest medvědů s Cibulkou (1972)
- How to Drown Dr. Mracek, the Lawyer (1974)
- Circus in the Circus (1975)
- Mach a Šebestová (TV series, 1976–1982)
- Arabela (TV series, 1980–1981)
- Létající Čestmír (TV series, 1984)
- Křeček v noční košili (TV series, 1987)
- Arabela Returns (TV series, 1993–1994)
- Wild Flowers (2000)

=== Books ===
- Člověk by nevěřil svým očím (1958) – poetry
- Živočichopis (1962)
- Hovory s veverkou (1963)
- Jakub a dvě stě dědečků (1963)
- Žirafa nebo tulipán? (1964)
- Mravenečník v početnici (1966)
- Pohádky (1971)
- Světe, div se (1974)
- Mach a Šebestová (1982)
- Láska a dělové koule (1989)
- Žofka (1992)
- Žofka ředitelkou zoo (2001)

=== Comics ===
- Muriel a andělé (1969, drawn by Kája Saudek)
- Muriel a oranžová smrt (1969–1970, drawn by Kája Saudek)
- Peruánský deník (1984, drawn by Kája Saudek)
