= Muriel a andělé =

Czech comic album

The main characters of the album, Muriel and angel Ro.

Muriel a andělé (Muriel and Angels) is a comic album written by Miloš Macourek and drawn by Kája Saudek, originally created in 1969 and published in 1991. The album is considered one of the masterworks of Czech comics; it was voted the best Czech comic in a poll held by the newspaper Mladá fronta DNES in 2009. Muriel and Angels tells the story of a young physician Muriel Ray and her friend Ro, a winged angel who came to Earth from a distant future. The main character was inspired by the Czech film star Olga Schoberová, and the main antagonist, militant general Ian Xeron, was inspired by Saudek's twin brother, photographer Jan Saudek.

== Background ==
Kája Saudek met Macourek in 1960, through Olga Schoberová, a young shopgirl in a Prague's ironmongery. Their artistic collaboration began in 1966, and was initially focused on film. Saudek created special effects for the film Kdo chce zabít Jessii? (Who Wants to Kill Jessie?); Macourek was a co-author of the screenplay. Following that, both artists decided to work also in the comics genre. The cycle about the adventures of a beautiful doctor Muriel was intended to have twelve parts; however, only two parts have been created.

The cycle was initially inspired by the French comic Barbarella, later adapted to a film by Roger Vadim. The main characters of the French and Czech albums are similar — a winged man and a beautiful young woman.

The publishing of the first part of the cycle was announced in 1969 in the magazine Mladý svět, however, the tightened communist censorship following the Prague Spring considered the story potentially dangerous and banned its publishing. Muriel and Angels was eventually published in 1991, following the fall of the Czechoslovak communist régime.

Muriel and Angels is considered one of Saudek's master works. It was inspired by "visual psychedelia" of the hippie culture of the 1960s, but additionally uses some elements of futurism and symbolism. Another characteristic feature of the book is Saudek's processing of the sequences of pictures, similar to film editing. The formatting of individual pages is unusual, given the time of the creation of the book. It makes use of bevelled frames, enabling innovative work with the space and perspective.

== Plot ==
At the beginning of the story, Muriel saves the life of the angel Ro. Ro enables her to visit the world of distant future, full of young and beautiful winged people, who live in peace and love, without wars and armies. Maniacal general Xeron manages to travel with them, but he doesn't like the optimistic and peaceful vision of future and attempts to prevent it. Muriel and Ro seek to protect a young boy, who is the future inventor of immortality. The boy's name is Mike Richardson.

== See also ==
- Muriel a oranžová smrt

== Literature ==
- Saudek, Kája; Macourek, Miloš (1991). Muriel a andělé. Prague: Comet. ISBN 80-85216-05-1.
