= Pavel Dias =

Czech photographer (1938–2021)

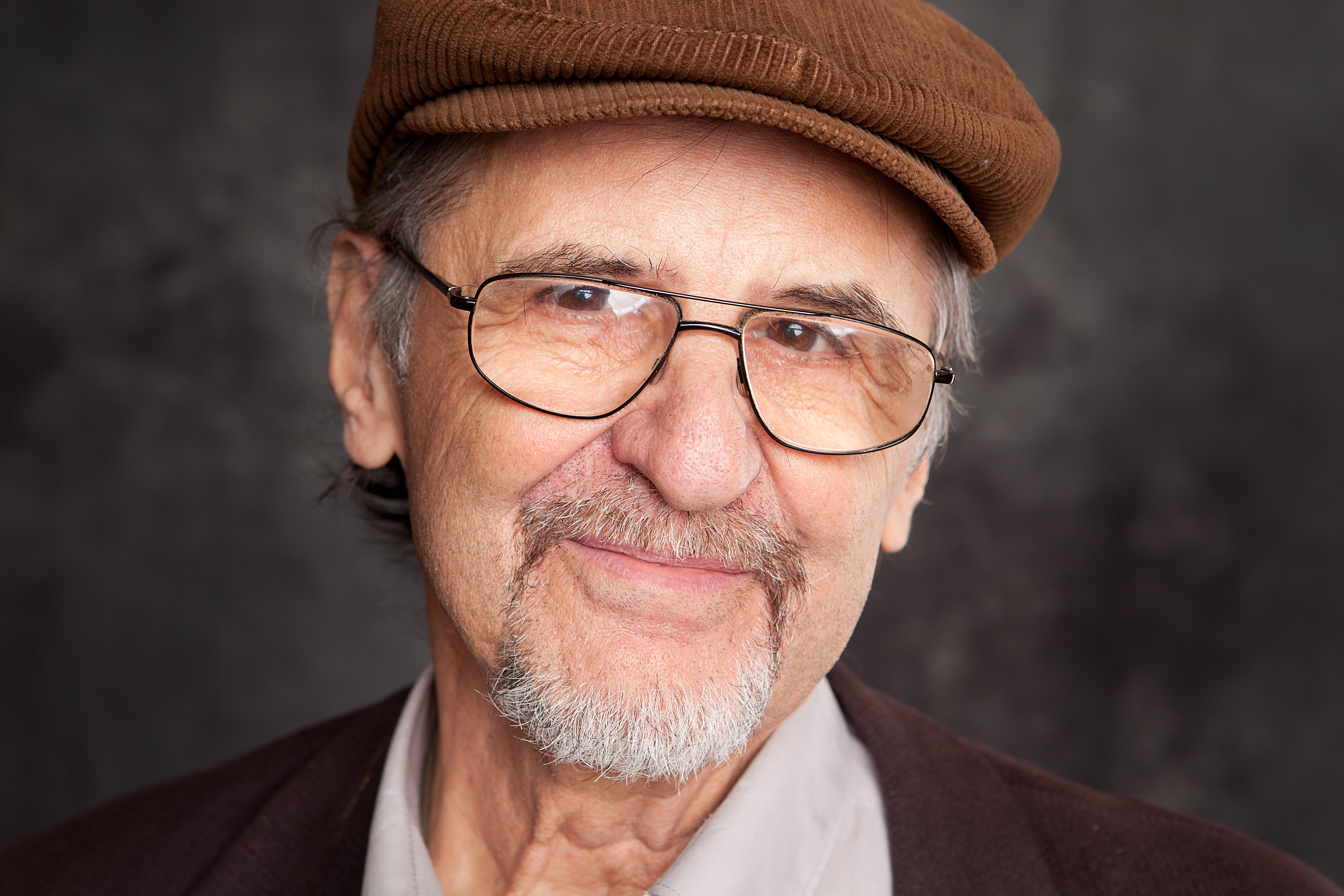
- Pavel Dias (2013)
- Born: 9 December 1938; Brno, Protectorate of Bohemia and Moravia
- Died: 19 April 2021 (aged 82); Prague, Czech Republic
- Resting place: Brno-Tuřany
- Education: FAMU
- Known for: photography
- Spouse: Hilda Misura-Dias

Pavel Dias (9 December 1938 – 19 April 2021) was a Czech photographer and university teacher. He was born in Brno and often spent his childhood in Brankovice. After studying at the Secondary school of Art and Design in Brno, where he met his later wife Hilda Misura-Dias, he continued to the Film and TV School of the Academy of Performing Arts in Prague (FAMU), which he completed in 1964 after a short break.

He worked as a documentary photographer and contributed his photos to several magazines. In addition, he also worked at universities in Prague and Zlín, where he taught photography. He spent part of his life working in film, he devoted himself to advertising photography. In his documentary work, he used simple, easy-to-read compositions. Throughout his life, he worked on various cycles, which he continuously presented at exhibitions and kept adding to.

== Life and work ==
Dias was born on 9 December 1938 in Brno. His father did not report to him, his mother Věra raised him. As a child, he often stayed in Brankovice in south Moravia with his grandparents and relatives on his mother's side, who were involved in the anti-Nazi resistance during the Nazi occupation of the Czech Republic and imprisoned in a concentration camp. The mother ran a confectionery in Kroměříž, but after the communist coup in 1948, she had to close the business and worked as a saleswoman in Zlín.

In the years 1954–1958, Pavel Dias studied photography at the Secondary school of Art and Design in Brno under professor Karel Otta Hrubý. Here he also met his later wife, also a photographer Hilda Misura-Dias (1940–2019). During his studies, he collaborated with a film studio in Zlín and helped to create the film Invention for Destruction directed by Karel Zeman. He also studied camera and photography for two years at FAMU and then worked as a photographer in Barrandov film studios until 1961, when he returned to study art photography at FAMU, which he completed in 1964 as the first-ever graduate of this field.

He contributed his photographs to the magazine Mladý svět from its foundation in 1959 until 1977. In the years 1964–1983, he was a photographer collaborating with various magazines. He mainly focused on advertising photography. In the years 1983–1988, he worked at the Secondary School of Arts and Crafts in Brno as the head of the photography department. In the years 1989–2009, he was a professor at the FAMU, in the years 2005–2018 he also taught photography at the Tomas Bata University in Zlín.

Pavel Dias collaborated with film, photographed horses and horse races, concentration camps as Holocaust memorials, and created documentary cycles. He implemented the Little Prince's Planet (in Czech Planeta malého prince) and Little Princes Messages (Poselství malých princů) projects to support children with hematological diseases. In 2008, he received the Personality of Czech Photography award for long-term contribution awarded by the Association of Professional Photographers of the Czech Republic.

He was the father of two sons. The elder Pavel (1961–1979) died young of acute leukemia. The second son Marek (* 1964) works as a ceramicist and art therapist in Český Krumlov and Besednice.

Pavel Dias died on 19 April 2021, in Saint Cross Hospital at Žižkov in Prague. The urn with the remains is kept in the family grave at the cemetery in Brno-Tuřany group 4, graves 255–256.

== Exhibitions (selection) ==
- Pavel Dias: Photography (Jaromír Funke Photo Cabinet, Brno, 1963)
- The Face of the Race (in Czech Tvář dostihu; Gallery D Prague, 1979)
- Torso of the Holocaust (1979)
- Pavel Dias: Photography (Jaromír Funke Photography Cabinet Brno, 1981)
- Pavel Dias: Photography (Gallery of Fine Arts Hodonín, 1988)
- Pavel Dias Retrospective (1989)
- Reminiscences of Paris (1989)
- Pavel Dias: Photographs 1955–1990 (House of Art of the Town of Brno, 1990)
- Pavel Dias: Photography (Prague House of Photography, 1994)
- Pavel Dias: Photographs (Silesian Museum, Opava, 1995)
- Zlín Returns (in Czech Zlínské návraty, 2001)
- Depths of memory (Hlubiny paměti; Great Synagogue in Plzeň, 2002)
- Monuments of Jewish culture in Southeastern Moravia (2003)
- Pavel Dias: Fifty years with photography (FONS Gallery, Pardubice, 2006)
- Pavel Dias: Padesát / Fifty (Langhans Gallery Prague, 2009)
- Pavel Dias: Photographs (Gallery 34 Brno, 2010)
- Pavel Dias: Photographs (New Synagogue, Prague, 2021)
- Pavel Dias: Torso – memories for the future (Pavel Dias: Torzo – vzpomínky pro budoucnost; House of the Black Madonna, Prague, 13 October 2021 – 28 November 2021)
- Pavel Dias: Photography (Red Church, Brno, 2022)
