= John Calley =

American film studio executive and producer

- John Calley in 1970
- Born: John Nicholas Calley; July 8, 1930; Jersey City, New Jersey, U.S.
- Died: September 13, 2011 (aged 81); Los Angeles, California, U.S.
- Resting place: Westwood Village Memorial Park Cemetery
- Occupations: American film studio executive, film producer
- Spouses: Olga Schoberová (m. 1972; div. 1992); Sandra Hotz Lean; Meg Tilly (m. 1995; div. 2002)

John Nicholas Calley (July 8, 1930 – September 13, 2011) was an American film studio executive and producer. He was quite influential during his years at Warner Bros., where he worked from 1968 to 1981, and "produced a film a month, on average, including commercial successes like The Exorcist and Superman." During his seven years at Sony Pictures starting in 1996, for five of which he was chairman and chief executive, he was credited with "reinvigorat[ing]" that major film studio.

== Awards and nominations ==
Together with Mike Nichols and Ismail Merchant, Calley produced 1993's The Remains of the Day, for which the trio received an Oscar nomination—Calley's only such Best Picture nomination.

A best picture nomination Calley potentially missed was when, as Sony's new head, he nixed the studio's backing of Terrence Malick's 1998 film The Thin Red Line, reportedly because he thought Malick couldn't keep to the budget. (The film stayed on budget and received seven Academy Award nominations.)

He was honored with the Irving G. Thalberg Memorial Award by the Academy of Motion Picture Arts and Sciences at the inaugural Governors Awards ceremony on November 11, 2009. For the ceremony, Calley, unable to attend in person due to illness, recorded remarks that were projected on a giant video screen, remarks characterizing the life of a film studio executive and called "one of the night's more startling bits of honesty": "You're very unhappy for a long period of time. And you don't experience joy. At the end you experience relief, if you're lucky."

According to Mervyn LeRoy in his autobiography Mervyn LeRoy: Take One, Calley played a big role in LeRoy's exit of Warner Bros. when The Kinney Company acquired it. Calley notified LeRoy that due to a "change in corporate thinking," the studio was not going to support his effort in producing the story Thirteen Clocks. When LeRoy asked Calley about the promises that he had made before, Calley answered "We'll have to wait and see."

In 2000, Calley was presented with a commemorative plaque honoring 750,000 copies sold of the soundtrack to the hit 1999 film Cruel Intentions.

== Personal life ==
Calley was born in Jersey City, New Jersey. He grew up in poverty and was raised by a single mother during the Great Depression. As a child, he worked at a button factory and then as a janitor at his own high school.

He attended Columbia University in the late 1940s, and then briefly served in the Army. His first significant industry job was at NBC's New York headquarters, at age 21, when he started in the mailroom.

From 1972 until a divorce in 1992, he was married to Czech actress and former Playboy cover girl Olga Schoberová. Calley adopted her daughter Sabrina, who became a set costumer.

When he left Warner Bros. in the early 1980s, citing an unhappy marriage and burn-out after involvement in the production of 120 films, Calley settled into a quieter life in his 35-room house on Fisher's Island in Long Island Sound. Later in the 1990s, with his companion, Sandra Hotz Lean, the ex-wife of famed film director Sir David Lean, the couple moved to Washington, CT. [See Discussion] In 1995, he married actress Meg Tilly; they divorced in 2002.

John Calley's best friend, director/producer Mike Nichols, with whom he collaborated on The Remains of the Day, as well as on Catch-22, Postcards from the Edge, The Birdcage and Closer, said this after Calley's death from a long-term, undisclosed illness: "John was unique. As a friend he was always there and always funny. He made life a joy for those he loved. As a studio head he was unfailingly supportive and didn't try to do the filmmaker's job. When he believed in someone he trusted and supported him and when very rarely he had a suggestion it was usually a lifesaver. In fact that's what he was: a lifesaver."

John Calley was also immediately familiar to the James Bond community. While at Warner Bros., he had trained Sean Connery to be cast in the movie Never Say Never Again. He was later instrumental in getting back to revive the EON James Bond film franchise with GoldenEye, during his tenure at United Artists. After he left United Artists, when he was at Sony, he attempted to sign with Kevin McClory and his Spectre Associates company to do another Bond film franchise based on the material used for Thunderball. Following it was a two-year lawsuit between Metro-Goldwyn-Mayer (MGM) and Sony, where MGM lawyers claimed it was "a disgruntled former executive at United Artists Pictures.", and it was resolved in March 1999, with MGM trading Spider-Man to Sony in exchange for auxiliary Bond claims.

After seven years at Sony, he launched John Calley Productions with a Sony deal.

== Filmography ==
He was a producer in all films unless otherwise noted.

=== Film ===
| Year | Film | Credit | Notes |
|---|---|---|---|
| 1963 | The Wheeler Dealers | Associate producer | |
| 1963 | Face in the Rain | | |
| 1964 | The Americanization of Emily | Associate producer | |
| 1965 | The Sandpiper | Associate producer | |
| 1965 | The Loved One | | |
| 1965 | The Cincinnati Kid | Associate producer | |
| 1966 | Eye of the Devil | | |
| 1967 | Don't Make Waves | | |
| 1968 | Ice Station Zebra | | Uncredited |
| 1969 | Castle Keep | | |
| 1970 | Catch-22 | | |
| 1989 | Fat Man and Little Boy | Executive producer | |
| 1990 | Postcards from the Edge | | |
| 1993 | The Remains of the Day | | |
| 2004 | Closer | | |
| 2006 | The Da Vinci Code | | |
| 2007 | The Jane Austen Book Club | | |
| 2009 | Angels & Demons | | Final film as a producer |

As an actor

| Year | Film | Role |
|---|---|---|
| 1997 | One Night Stand | Charlie's Father |

=== Television ===
| Year | Title | Credit |
|---|---|---|
| 2007 | The Company | Executive producer |

== Philanthropy ==
The John N. Calley Foundation was founded in 2012 after John Calley's death in 2011. Given his reputation for identifying and nurturing creative visionaries, The Calley Foundation honors John Calley's legacy by providing opportunities for unrecognized, talented youth. The Foundation is based in Southern California and funds various non-profit organizations, including the Ghetto Film School - Los Angeles.
