= Mach a Šebestová =

Czech animated television series

- Mach, Šebestová, and Jonatán the dog
- Genre: Children's television series
- Created by: Miloš Macourek; Jaroslav Doubrava; Adolf Born
- Screenplay by: Miloš Macourek; Adolf Born
- Directed by: Miloš Macourek; Adolf Born; Jaroslav Doubrava
- Narrated by: Petr Nárožný
- Composers: Luboš Fišer; Marek Eben
- Countries of origin: Czechoslovakia (1976–1982); Czech Republic (1998–2005)
- Original language: Czech
- No. of series: 3
- No. of episodes: 34

Production
- Producers: Jiří Šebestík; Zdeňka Deitchová; Dagmar Juráková
- Running time: 7 minutes
- Production company: Bratři v triku

Original release
- Release: 1976 – 2005

Mach a Šebestová is a Czech animated series written by Miloš Macourek and Jaroslav Doubrava, and designed by painter Adolf Born. The characters were voiced by Petr Nárožný. It was produced in the animation studio Bratři v triku, a part of Krátký film.

The story follows the adventures of two young students and a magical telephone receiver. The first series, consisting of 13 episodes, was broadcast on Czechoslovak Television between 1976 and 1983. Mach a Šebestová is one of the most popular series made for the children's nightly television programme Večerníček.

The story was adapted to storybooks as well as audio recordings, and in 2001, the feature film Mach, Šebestová a kouzelné sluchátko by director Václav Vorlíček, was released.

== Synopsis ==
Two ordinary schoolchildren, Mach and Šebestová, gain magical powers thanks to a gift in the form of a broken phone receiver. The receiver fulfils their wishes, allowing them to visit various places around the world and beyond, travelling through time, and encountering interesting and unusual situations. During their adventures, the duo is usually followed by a friendly dog named Jonatán, and they often meet its owner, Mrs. Kadrnožková. Two of their classmates, poor students and incorrigible rascals Horáček and Pažout, are the show's main antagonists. Each episode begins with Mach climbing down the railing to Šebestová's door on his way to school, ringing her doorbell, and hiding. When Šebestová opens the door, she is startled and screams, and they go to school together.

== Characters ==
- Mach – a smart and imaginative third-grader who likes to scare Šebestová; he wears glasses and is known by his surname.
- Šebestová – a cheerful and curious third-grader with a sense for fairness who likes to be scared; she wears a bow in her red hair and is known by her surname.
- Jonatán – Mrs. Kadrnožková's dog, who follows Mach and Šebestová everywhere and likes to chase Micka the cat
- Mrs. Kadrnožková – Jonathan's owner and a neighbor of Mach and Šebestová
- Teacher – Mach and Šebestová's authoritarian teacher
- Horáček – Mach and Šebestová's classmate, best friend of Pažout; he is a troublemaker.
- Cyril Pažout – Mach and Šebestová's classmate, best friend of Horáček; he is a troublemaker.
- Director – Headmaster of Mach and Šebestová's school; he is elegant and constantly amazed by everything.
- Mr. František Huml – a Neanderthal whom Mach and Šebestová brought back from the past and who became a janitor at their school
- Josef Kropáček – Mach and Šebestová's classmate who is often sick; Mach and Šebestová crawled into his throat and cured him.
- Pirates – armed, mostly unshaven, and one-eyed; Mach and Šebestová class made a friendly visit to their ship.
- Čermáková – Mach and Šebestová's curly-haired classmate
- The aliens Ťapťap – life forms from another planet, they consider Mach and Šebestová to be mice.
- Kamencovi – a wealthy couple and temporary owners of Jonatán, whom they enslave in one episode
- Mrs. Vydrová – Mach and Šebestová babysit her son Petříček; she can speak an octave higher than other people.
- Mr. Krupička – Mach and Šebestová's neighbor; he plays the clarinet, and he and his wife laugh at various household situations.
- Mr. Slepíčka – a veterinarian who has a dozen turtles in his garden

== List of episodes ==
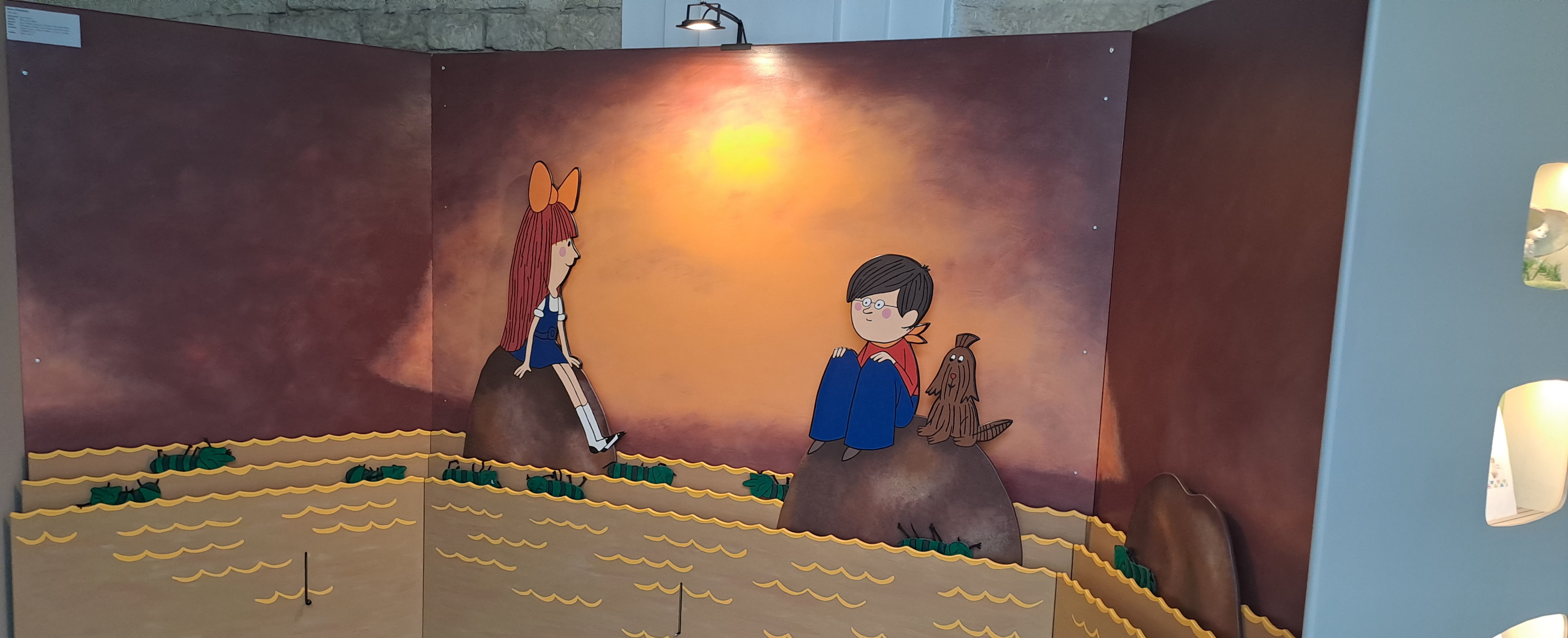
Mach and Šebestová at the 60th-anniversary Večerníček exhibition in Prague, 2025

=== Mach a Šebestová (1976–1983) ===
- O utrženém sluchátku
- Školní výlet
- Člověk neandrtálský
- Kropáček má anginu
- Zoologická zahrada
- Přírodní zákony
- Piráti
- Vzorné chování
- Policejní pes
- Páni tvorstva
- Oběť pro kamaráda
- Jak Mach a Šebestová hlídali dítě
- Ukradené sluchátko

=== Mach a Šebestová na prázdninách (1998–1999) ===
- Jak Mach a Šebestová jeli na prázdniny
- Jak Jonatán chytil blechu
- Jak Mach a Šebestová udělali z dědečka Tarzana
- Jak Mach a Šebestová prožili deštivé odpoledne
- Jak Mach a Šebestová udělali z malíře Kolouška žáka Leonarda da Vinci
- Jak Mach a Šebestová poslali lístek paní Kadrnožkové
- Jak Mach a Šebestová potrestali paní Tláskalovou
- Jak Mach a Šebestová zavinili zmizení Lukáše Tůmy
- Jak Mach a Šebestová splnili životní sen paní Janderové
- Jak Šebestovi přijeli za dcerou na víkend
- Jak Mach a Šebestová navštívili cirkus
- Jak se stal Jonatán hrdinou dne
- Jak se Mach a Šebestová vrátili z prázdnin

=== Mach a Šebestová na cestách (2005) ===
- Jak Mach a Šebestová závodili s domorodým kouzelníkem
- Jak se Mach a Šebestová koupali v Amazonce
- Jak Mach a Šebestová navštívili severní pól
- Jak Mach a Šebestová zachraňovali v Paříži tetu Vilmu
- Jak se Mach a Šebestová potápěli u Havajských ostrovů
- Jak Mach a Šebestová zachránili v Benátkách Horáčka s Pažoutem
- Jak Mach a Šebestová hledali v Austrálii Jonatána
- Jak Mach a Šebestová navštívili s Jonatánem Hollywood

== Books ==
- Mach a Šebestová: Pro děti od 6 let (1982, 1984, 1989)
- Mach a Šebestová (1985, 1988)
- Mach a Šebestová na prázdninách (1993, 1999, 2002, 2008)
- Mach a Šebestová ve škole (1997, 2000, 2003, 2011)
- Mach a Šebestová za školou (1998, 2001, 2004)
- Mach a Šebestová na cestách (2000, 2004)
- Mach, Šebestová a kouzelné sluchátko (2001)
- Mach a Šebestová v historii (2002, 2009)

== Audio recordings ==
- Mach a Šebestová na prázdninách (1996)
- Mach a Šebestová na cestách (2000)
- Mach, Šebestová a kouzelné sluchátko (2002)
- Mach a Šebestová v historii (2002)
- Mach a Šebestová Nejlepší dobrodružství (2006)
