= I Killed Einstein, Gentlemen =

1970 Czechoslovak science fiction comedy film

- DVD cover
- Directed by: Oldřich Lipský
- Written by: Josef Nesvadba, Miloš Macourek, Oldřich Lipský
- Produced by: Jiří Krejčí
- Starring: Jiří Sovák, Jana Brejchová, Lubomír Lipský, Iva Janžurová, Petr Čepek
- Cinematography: Ivan Šlapeta
- Edited by: Miroslav Hájek
- Music by: Vlastimil Hála
- Production company: Filmové studio Barrandov
- Distributed by: Ústřední půjčovna filmů
- Release date: February 27, 1970 (Czechoslovakia)
- Running time: 95 min.
- Country: Czechoslovakia (Czechia)
- Language: Czech

I Killed Einstein, Gentlemen (Czech: Zabil jsem Einsteina, pánové) is a 1970 Czechoslovak science fiction comedy film directed by Oldřich Lipský. The film starred Jiří Sovák, Jana Brejchová, Lubomír Lipský, Iva Janžurová and Petr Čepek. The plot revolves around time travel to the past to change the future.

== Cast ==
- Jiří Sovák – Professor David Moore
- Jana Brejchová – Gwen Williamsová
- Lubomír Lipský – Professor Frank Pech
- Iva Janžurová – Betsy
- Petr Čepek – Albert Einstein
- Radoslav Brzobohatý – Robert
- Svatopluk Beneš – Giacometti
- Jan Libícek – Smith
- Viktor Maurer – Snyder
- Miloš Kopecký – Wertheim
- Stella Zázvorková – Wertheimová
- Oldrich Musil – Rektor Rath
- Josef Hlinomaz – Velitel policie
- Karel Effa – Zástupce velitele policie
- Josef Bláha – reditel Fizikálního ustávu
- Josef Kemr – Professor Hughes

== Production ==
The film was shot in late summer 1968 and premiered in Czechoslovakia on 27 February 1970.

== Analysis ==
In the film, a character uses a device which has been likened to a selfie stick, several decades before its modern design was developed.
