= Lips Tullian =

Comic series written by Jaroslav Weigel and drawn by Kája Saudek

A page from the comic series Lips Tullian by Kája Saudek and Jaroslav Weigel.

Lips Tullian (or Lips Tullian, nejobávanější náčelník lupičů) (in English: Lips Tullian, the Most Redoubtable Leader of Bandits) is a comic series written by Jaroslav Weigel and drawn by Kája Saudek in 1972. It is set in the 17th century and features an eponymous highwayman. The series was published by the popular Czechoslovak weekly magazine Mladý svět. The plot is based on romantic adventure stories by Kvidon of Felses (in Czech: Kvidon z Felsů), published in the late 19th century. The comic won wide acclaim from the readership in Czechoslovakia. In a 1973 letter to his friend Pavel Nosek, Saudek notes that the circulation of the magazine increased by 105,000 during the period of publishing of Lips Tullian. The series was only published for one year; it was banned by communist censorship in December 1972. In 2010, thirty-eight years after its creation, the complete series was published as a book. In a poll organized in 2009, the Czech comics server Komiksarium selected Lips Tullian as the third most significant Czech comic in the history of the genre.

== Background ==
Saudek won his first recognition in 1966, as the creator of special effects and illustrations for the film Kdo chce zabít Jessii? (Who Wants to Kill Jessie?). However, the promising start of his career was complicated by the events of the Prague Spring and subsequent "normalization" of Czechoslovak society. The official cultural apparatus considered Saudek's style too "American", and some of his critics labelled his work as an example of bourgeois kitsch. His early mature works were banned and published only after the fall of the communist regime.

In the late 1960s, Saudek met and befriended the journalist Rudolf Křesťan, an editor in Mladý svět. Křesťan enabled him to publish a part of his album Muriel a andělé (Muriel and Angels) in the magazine. In 1971, Saudek became a regular contributor to Mladý svět. However, the first significant opportunity to work for the magazine only came a year later. At the beginning of 1972, Saudek began collaborating on a new series with Jaroslav Weigel, a member of the Jára Cimrman Theatre. The series, titled Lips Tullian, nejobávanější náčelník lupičů, was published weekly as a part of the magazine. During the period of "normalization" in Czechoslovakia, comics were considered potentially damaging to young people. The creators and the editorial board attempted to select a non-controversial topic in order to "keep the balance between the attractiveness of the magazine and the political pressure". For that purpose, Weigel paraphrased the stories from the popular novelettes depicting the adventures of the highwayman Filip of Mengenstein, alias Lips Tullian.

According to the Czech comics expert Tomáš Prokůpek, the series achieved "phenomenal success" and a long queues of impatient readers crowded in front of newsstands each Wednesday (the day of publishing of Mladý svět). However, the success of the comics attracted the attention not only of readers, but also of the communist censors and the official media. The first problems came in the summer of 1972. In reaction, the editorial board of the magazine attempted to protect the series by publishing an interview with Saudek in which he resolutely repudiated any association with Western comics. Paradoxically, the interview provoked another seditious campaign against the series. Despite the protests of readers and fans, Lips Tullian had to vanish from the pages of Mladý svět in December, 1972.

In 1973, the editorial board of Mladý svět made a covert attempt to resurrect the series. The hero was renamed Černý Filip (Black Filip) and the plot was moved to another period of Czech history. However, the intention was disclosed and the renewed series was banned again without an explanation. Only six episodes were published. Lips Tullian later appeared in other of Saudek's works, most notably in the albums Stříbrný poklad (Silver Treasure, 1982) and Konec Sahrbergovy bandy (The End of the Sahrberg Bunch, 1985).

The disfavour of the censors didn't prevent the continuing popularity of the series in Czechoslovakia; the original pages of the series are a valuable collector's artifact. The comics series Lips Tullian is considered an example of creative freedom in communist Czechoslovakia.

== Style ==
Working on Lips Tullian was an unusual task for Saudek. Up to that time, he had mainly depicted the contemporary world or visions of the future. The historical theme of the series required a different approach and technique. Another problem was the lack of space intended for a large amount of plot and text in each episode. Gradually, he managed to adapt the format to his own style. Saudek's style changed significantly from the previous period (Muriel albums), however, he has retained one of the most characteristic elements of his style: the need to paraphrase and cite his previous works in a new and surprising associations. Additionally, the series utilizes "innumerable" double entendres, jokes and hidden meanings (in the text as well as in the illustrations) in each episode. Lips Tullian, a highwayman from the 17th century, bears closer resemblance to modern superheroes than to a historical character. As a defender of the poor and tormented, he doesn't hesitate to help anywhere; however, his efforts focus mainly on rescuing beautiful women from the hands of evil villains. Eroticism and reflection of female beauty is another important element, characteristic throughout the whole of Saudek's oeuvre. The plot is naïve (based on kitschy 19th-century novels) and the main theme of the series is, in Saudek's words: "revenge and love in many variations, the topic still living".
