= Vladimír Neff =

Czech writer and translator (1909–1983)

Vladimír Neff (13 June 1909, Prague – 2 July 1983, Prague) was a Czech writer and translator. He wrote numerous historical novels, political satires, and parodies on criminal stories and adventure tales. He was declared as a National Artist of Czechoslovakia in 1979.

He was known for his historical novels, especially the pentalogy Reasonable marriages, Emperor's violets, Mean blood, The happy widow and The royal charioteer (Sňatky z rozumu, Císařské fialky, Zlá krev, Veselá vdova and Královský vozataj) and the satirical pseudo-historical trilogy depicting the travels and adventures of an imaginary nobleman, Petr Kukaň z Kukaně (Peter Coop from Coop), consisting of the books Queens have no legs, The ring of the Borgias and The beautiful sorceress (Královny nemají nohy, Prsten Borgiů and Krásná čarodějka).

He was the father of the contemporary publicist and science-fiction writer, Ondřej Neff.

== See also ==
- List of Czech writers
