= Straw Hat (film) =

1971 Czechoslovak comedy film

- DVD cover
- Czech: Slaměný klobouk
- Directed by: Oldřich Lipský
- Written by: Miloš Macourek; Oldřich Lipský
- Story by: Eugène Labiche; Marc-Michel
- Based on: The Italian Straw Hat
- Starring: Miloš Kopecký; Iva Janžurová; Vladimír Menšík; Stella Zázvorková; Lubomír Kostelka; Květa Fialová; Pavel Landovský; Jirí Hrzán; Ilja Prachař; Josef Kemr
- Cinematography: Jaroslav Kučera
- Edited by: Miroslav Hájek
- Music by: Luboš Fišer
- Production company: Barrandov Studios
- Distributed by: Ústřední půjčovna filmů
- Release date: 24 March 1971
- Running time: 88 minutes
- Country: Czechoslovakia
- Language: Czech

Straw Hat (Czech: Slaměný klobouk) is a 1971 Czechoslovak comedy film written by Miloš Macourek and Oldřich Lipský, and directed by Lipský as well. It stars Miloš Kopecký in the leading role. The film is based on the 1851 play The Italian Straw Hat by Eugène Labiche and Marc-Michel.

== Summary ==
Fadinard is on the way to his wedding, when his horse picks up and eats a straw hat. The owner of the hat is a married woman who, at the time, is in the embrace of a French officer, Lieutenant Tavernier. The officer follows Fadinard to his home and demands that he replace the hat, so that his mistress can return home to her husband without arousing suspicion. Fearing that Tavernier will wreck his new apartment, Fadinard hastens to his wedding, using every opportunity he can to find a replacement hat. When he finally manages to find one, things become even more complicated.

== Cast and characters ==
- Miloš Kopecký as Maurice Fadinard
- Iva Janžurová as Helenka, Fadinard's fiancée
- Vladimír Menšík as Bernard Nonancourt, greengrocer
- Stella Zázvorková as Aunt Klotylda
- Lubomír Kostelka as Uncle Charles
- Květa Fialová as Anais Beauperthuis
- Pavel Landovský as Officer Emil
- Jirí Hrzán as Cousin Bobin
- Ilja Prachař as Albert Beauperthuis
- Josef Kemr as Servant Felix
