= Happy End (1967 film) =

1967 Czechoslovak New Wave absurdist dark comedy film by Oldřich Lipský

- Directed by: Oldřich Lipský
- Written by: Oldřich Lipský; Miloš Macourek
- Produced by: Miloš Stejskal
- Starring: Vladimír Menšík
- Cinematography: Vladimír Novotný
- Edited by: Miroslav Hájek
- Music by: Vlastimil Hála
- Distributed by: Národní filmový archiv
- Release date: 1967
- Running time: 71 minutes
- Country: Czechoslovakia
- Language: Czech

Happy End is a 1967 Czechoslovak New Wave absurdist dark comedy film directed by Oldřich Lipský. Theodor Pištěk designed the costumes for the film. The film is told backwards, beginning with the protagonist's death (which he describes as his birth) and ending with his birth (described as his death).

== Plot ==
Happy End tells the life story of a butcher named Bedřich Frydrych; however, it is told entirely in reverse, giving rise to a different story than the one a forward-flowing narrative would depict. It thus begins with Bedřich's "birth" (his execution by guillotine), followed by a "childhood" spent in school (prison), whereupon he sets out into the world and soon marries, although he has to assemble his wife-to-be from various parts (killing and dismembering her, after finding out she is having an affair).

The reversed chronology also applies to dialogue: lines are read in an ostensibly reversed order, variously resulting in sheer situational comedy and dada.

== Cast ==
- Vladimír Menšík - Butcher Bedřich Frydrych
- Jaroslava Obermaierová - Julie
- Josef Abrhám - Ptáček
- Bohuš Záhorský - Father-in-law
- Stella Zázvorková - Mother-in-law
- Jaroslav Štercl - Constable
- Helena Růžičková - Brunette
- Josef Hlinomaz - Commissioner
- Martin Růžek - Prosecutor
- Jiří Steimar
- Bedřich Prokos - Priest
- Mirko Musil - Warden
