= Ondřej Neff =

Czech science fiction writer and journalist

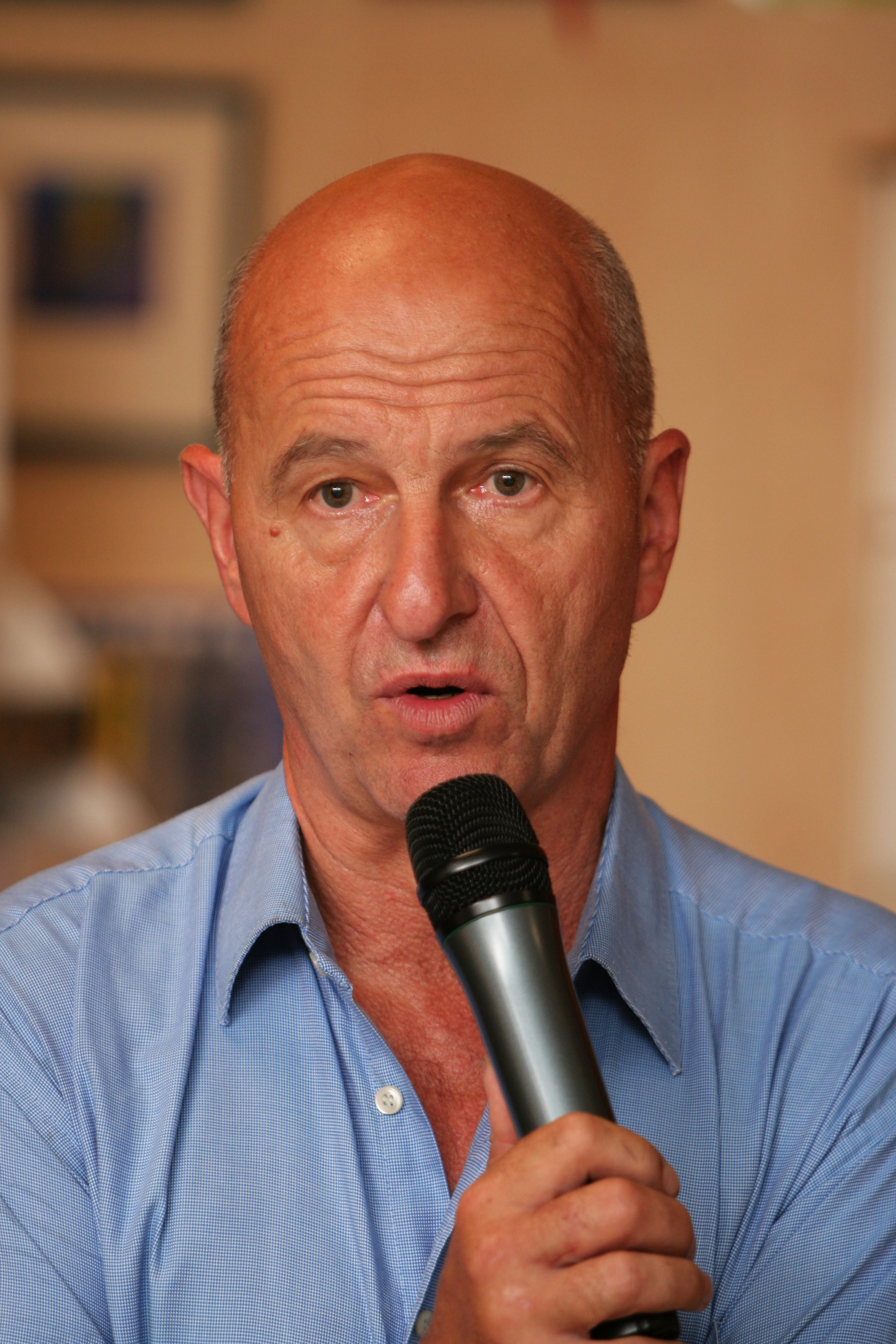
Ondřej Neff (2007).

Ondřej Neff (born June 26, 1945, Prague) is a Czech science fiction writer and journalist. He is the founder of Neviditelný pes (The Invisible Dog), one of the earliest and most popular Czech daily news/comments websites, and Digineff, a website about digital photography for amateurs.

His father Vladimír Neff was a popular writer, author of many historical novels.

Neff had two children with his first wife: a son, David, born in 1970, who works as a photographer for Mladá fronta DNES and a singer; and a daughter named Irena, born in 1979, murdered by her husband on 23 February 2008.

Ondřej Neff has supported Czech President Václav Klaus in his fight against environmentalism. He described his opinions, for example, in the article Klaus versus the Warming Ideology.

== Works ==
- 1978 Holky se perou jinak (with Vladimír Kovářík ml.)
- 1980 Klukoviny a tátoviny
- 1981 Tajná kniha o fotografii
- 1983 A včely se vyrojily (humorous novel)
- 1987 Večery u krbu (remembrances of his father)
- 1991 Černobílé hodinky
- 1997 – 1999 Neviditelný pes (books)

=== Non-fiction ===
- 1978 Podivuhodný svět Julese Vernea (Monography about Jules Verne and his work)
- 1981 Něco je jinak (history of Czech SF)
- 1985 Tři eseje o české sci-fi
- 1987 Všechno je jinak (history of world sci-fi – with Alexandr Kramer, unacknowledged due to censorship)
- 1999 Jak blufovat o sci-fi
- 1995, 1996, 1997, 1998, 1999 Klon (essay collections)

=== Own sci-fi writings ===
(Only four short stories were translated to English, collected later on as "Fourth Day to Eternity and Other Stories" (Manila: Anvil 2015); names in parentheses are just approximate translations of the titles.)

- 1984 Jádro pudla (juvenile novel)
- 1985 Vejce naruby (An Egg Inside Out), a collection of short stories, including:
  - Bílá hůl ráže 7,62 (White Cane 7.62) – a horror story describes an alien invasion through hijacking a visual signal coming from an interstellar probe captured by the aliens. The modified signal triggers a process similar to a buffer overflow in a human brain, rewriting the victim's DNA and turning it into a copy of the alien attacker. A very similar theme was used independently by David Langford in the short story "BLIT". The invasion is thwarted with the help of a blind stunt driver trained to shoot on sound, who, to add to the conflict, happens to be a pacifist.
  - Zelená je barva naděje (Green is the Colour of Hope) – describes an invention of an apparatus used for reading animal's minds and presenting them to humans in image form. The inventor tests the device on his friends' aquarium, causing much distress and anger because the apparatus shows the aquarium fish dreaming about killing and eating the humans, and dominating the world; as a consequence, all humans who saw the experiment feel they will never be able to trust any pet animal again.
  - Strom (The Tree) – a vision of a society after a near-miss ecological catastrophe, which was avoided only thanks to draconian laws of environment protection that put the nature and its preservation well above human life. The characters, last dwellers of a small village, are fighting a losing battle for their homes against a growing forest, as the laws prevent them from harming any tree.
- 1987 Čtvrtý den až navěky (The Fourth Day Forever, coll)
- 1988 Měsíc mého života (The Moon of My Life, novel)
- 1989 Pole šťastných náhod (The Field of Good Chances, marginally fantastic novel)
- 1989 Čarodějův učeň (The Wizard's Apprentice, sequel to Jádro pudla)
- 1990 Zepelín na Měsíci (A Zeppelin on the Moon, coll)
- 1991 Vesmír je dost nekonečný (The Universe is Infinite Enough, coll)
- 1991 Šídlo v pytli (sequel to Jádro pudla)
- 1992 – 1995 Milénium (The Millennium) – three parts: Země ohrožená (Earth Endangered), Země bojující (Earth Fighting), Země vítězná (Earth Victorious)
- 1997 Reparátor (The Reparator, novel)
- 1997 Bůh s. r. o. (God, Ltd., coll)
- 1998 Tma (The Darkness, award for best Czech SF; revised version Tma 2.0 in 2003)
- 2003 Pravda o pekle (The Truth about Hell, coll)
- 2003 Tma 2.0 (The Darkness, 2.0, a revised version of Tma)
- 2004 Dvorana zvrhlosti (The Hall of Aberrations, coll, ISBN 80-204-1534-3)
- 2006 Rock mého života (The Rock of My Life)
- 2007 Tušení podrazu (A Glimpse of a Dirty Trick, ISBN 978-80-00-01942-0)

=== Scenarios for comics of Kája Saudek ===
- 1988 Arnal a dva dračí zuby (ČSS)
- 1990 Štěstí, Slavkovská romance, Příhoda na mostě (ČSS)
- 1992 Silvestrovský speciál (Nei report)
- 1993 Noc upírů (Nei report)
- from 1996 comic strip Bart sám doma

=== Works for radio ===
- 1984 Portonský dryák
- 1985 Počkej, Hektore
- 1987 Velká solární
- 1988 Ano, jsem robot (prix Bohemia 1989)
- 1991 Havárie Drakkaru

==== Dramatization ====
- 1990 Zvíře z hvězd (The Star Beast by Robert A. Heinlein)
- 1996 Válka světů (The War of the Worlds by H. G. Wells)

==== Verne's books ====
- 1988 Michal Strogov aneb Carův kurýr (Michael Strogoff, the Courier of the Czar)
- 1991 Honba za meteorem (The Chase of the Golden Meteor)
- 1986 Cesta kolem světa za 80 dní (Around the World in Eighty Days)
- 1995 20 000 mil pod mořem (Twenty Thousand Leagues Under the Seas, 5 parts)
- 1996 Vynález zkázy (Facing the Flag, 2 parts)

=== Other ===
- Comics Pérák (own scenario and drawings).
- Many fan convention talks, in the 1980s especially about English-language SF
- Translation of William Gibson's Neuromancer
- SF stories in anthologies: Lidé ze souhvězdí Lva, Železo přichází z hvězd, Lety zakázanou rychlostí, Let na Měsíc etc.
