= Oldřich Lipský =

Czech film director (1924–1986)

- Born: 4 July 1924; Pelhřimov, Czechoslovakia
- Died: 19 October 1986 (aged 62); Prague, Czechoslovakia
- Occupations: Film director, screenwriter
- Years active: 1950–1986
- Relatives: Lubomír Lipský (brother)

Oldřich Lipský (4 July 1924 – 19 October 1986) was a Czech film director and screenwriter. He focused exclusively on filming comedies and his work includes more than twenty films. Among his films with international success are Lemonade Joe (1964) and Happy End (1967). His brother was the actor Lubomír Lipský. In addition to his brother, he often collaborated with Miloš Kopecký, Jiří Brdečka, Miloš Macourek, Zdeněk Svěrák and Ladislav Smoljak.

== Early life and family ==
Oldřich Lipský was born on 4 July 1924 in Pelhřimov. His father was a confectioner and amateur actor. Oldřich had two brothers. His older brother was the actor Lubomír Lipský. His younger brother Dalibor died at the age of 16, but he appeared as an actor in two films. His wife Šárka (1926–2014) was a dancer and choreographer. Lipský had two children: a son, Dalibor (born 1954), who is a film editor and producer, and a daughter, Ludmila, who became a physician. Lipský's grandson, Tomáš, became an actor.

== Education and theatre ==
During their high school studies, Oldřich Lipský, Lubomír Lipský and their friends from the Pelhřimov Gymnasium established the amateur theatre Dramatické studio mladých ('Youth Drama Studio'). From 1945 until its closure in 1949, it was a professional theatre and was called the Theatre of Satire. Oldřich Lipský worked there as a director and occasional actor. At that time, he was also studying at the Faculty of Arts of the Charles University in Prague, but left his studies to devote himself to theatre and film.

== Filmmaking and late life ==
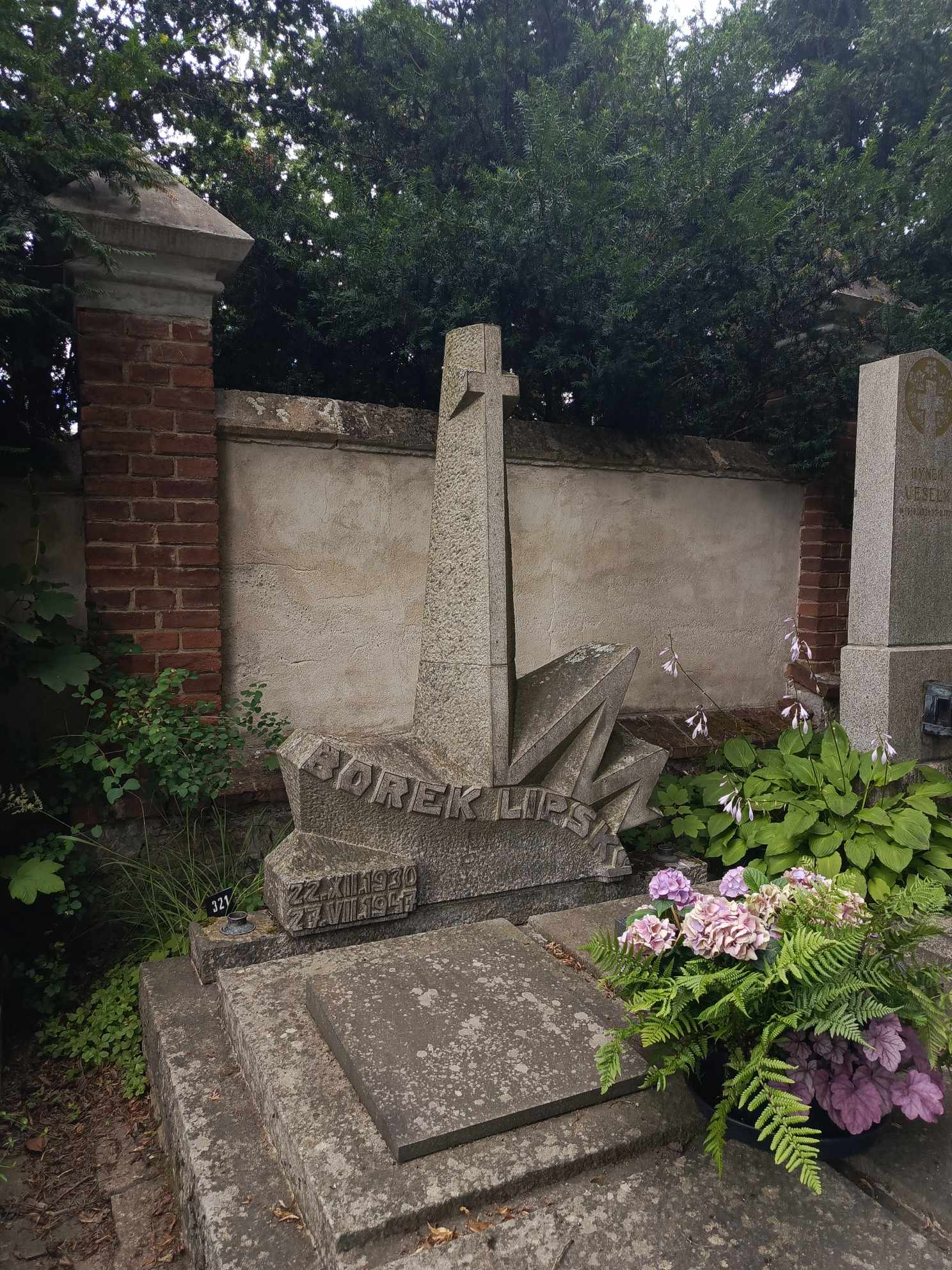
Grave of Oldřich Lipský and his brother Dalibor

Lipský's first experience with film was a clapper loader and a small role in the film Řeka čaruje (1945), where his brother Dalibor also appeared. Oldřich Lipský also had a small role in Thunder in the Hills (1946). From 1949, he worked in the Barrandov Studios in various filmmaking professions, first as an assistant director and screenwriter. Thanks to his sense of humor and exaggeration, he devoted his entire work to comedy films. He cooperated as director with Jan Strejček on The Hen and the Sexton (1950), but his directorial debut is considered Cirkus bude! (1954).

Lipský repeatedly devoted himself to several comedy subgenres. He made several parodies, such as Lemonade Joe (1964), which was a worldwide success. He liked the circus environment, so he made several comedies with this theme (e.g. Šest medvědů s Cibulkou, 1972; also distributed worldwide). He often worked on sci-fi and fantasy comedies, where he applied his sense of exaggeration (e.g. I Killed Einstein, Gentlemen, 1969), and on films for children (e.g. Long Live Ghosts!, 1977). Among his most successful films is the experimental film Happy End, which takes place in reverse. In 1969, it was declared the best film at the Sitges Film Festival.

Lipský regularly collaborated with the screenwriters Jiří Brdečka, Miloš Macourek, Zdeněk Svěrák and Ladislav Smoljak. The most frequently cast actors included Miloš Kopecký and his brother Lubomír Lipský.

Oldřich Lipský suddenly died of a heart attack on 19 October 1986 in Prague, aged 62. He died during filming of Velká filmová loupež while at home preparing for another day of filming. He is buried in Pelhřimov.

== Filmography ==
- The Hen and the Sexton (1950) – together with Jan Strejček
- Cirkus bude! (1954)
- Jaroslav Hasek's Exemplary Cinematograph (1955)
- Hvězda jede na jih (1958)
- Man in Outer Space (1962)
- Lemonade Joe (1964)
- Happy End (1967)
- I Killed Einstein, Gentlemen (1969)
- Four Murders Are Enough, Darling (1971)
- Straw Hat (1971)
- Šest medvědů s Cibulkou (1972)
- Jáchyme, hoď ho do stroje! (1974)
- Circus in the Circus (1975)
- Marecek, Pass Me the Pen! (1976)
- Dinner for Adele (1977)
- Long Live Ghosts! (1977)
- The Mysterious Castle in the Carpathians (1981)
- Srdečný pozdrav ze zeměkoule (1983)
- Tři veteráni (1983)
- Velká filmová loupež (1986; finished by Zdeněk Podskalský after Lipský's death)

== Honours and legacy ==
In Pelhřimov, there is the Lipský family memorial hall "MÚZYum". It contains an exhibition about the life and work of the Lipský brothers, and recalls famous quotes and scenes from their films.

In 2024, an edition of postage stamps featuring Oldřich and Lubomír Lipský was issued to mark the centenary of their births.
