= Rosa Galcerán =

Spanish cartoonist, advertising artist, and poet (1917–2015)

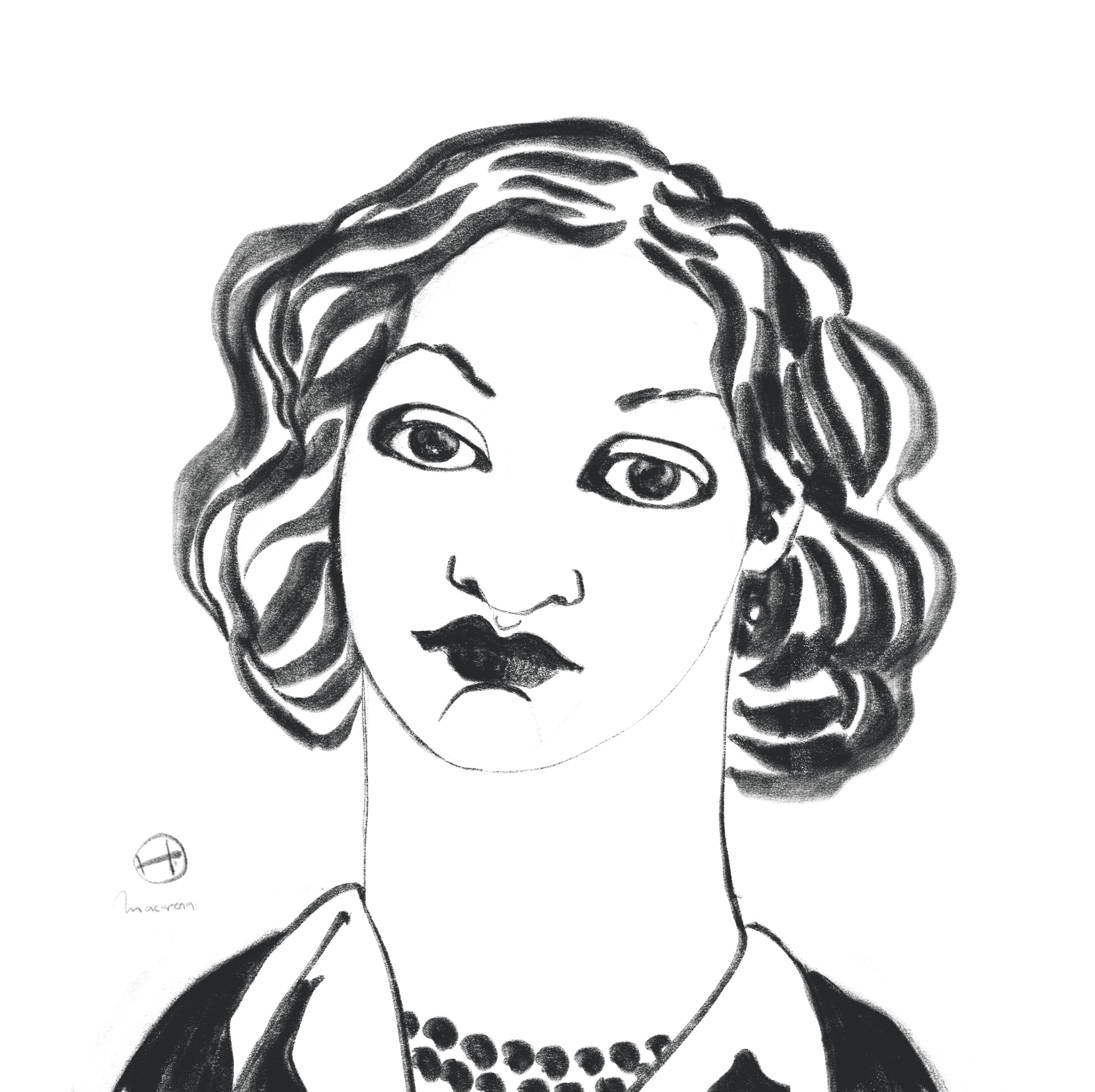
- Rosa Galcerán
- Born: 1917; Barcelona, Spain
- Died: 28 November 2015 (aged 97–98)
- Occupations: Cartoonist, graphic artist, poet

Rosa Galcerán Vilanova (Barcelona, 1917 – 28 November 2015) was a Spanish cartoonist, advertising artist, and poet. She was a pioneer in her work as a comics artist, at a time when the profession was mostly male.

== Career ==
Galcerán was first published in the magazine Porvenir in 1937. Between 1942 and 1946, she joined the production company Diarmo Films collaborating in the first animated films with Arturo Moreno: El capitán Tormentoso, Garbancito de la Mancha (1945) and Alegre vacations. She alternated this work with collaborations in the magazine in under editor Consuelo Gil.

Until 1971, most of her subsequent work for the women's publications of Editorial Toray, mainly for the fairy tale magazine Azucena, which she founded in 1946. She also published the collection Cuentos de la Abuelita ("Grandma's Stories", 1949).

She was a member of the literary group Poesía Viva and the Seminar of poetic research. In addition to her work in illustration and advertising, Galcerán devoted herself to painting and published several works of poetry. In 1997, she published the book Poemes de Tardor (Ed. Poesía Viva) and in 2004 Sons y Ressons (Ed. Comte D'aure, S.L. 2004, eBook).
