= Sons of the Devil =

Comic book series

- Cover art for Sons of the Devil #1 (May 2015) by Toni Infante; All Image Comics characters are trademarks of and copyright 2008 Image Comics or their respective owners.

Publication information
- Publisher: Image Comics
- Format: Ongoing series
- Publication date: May 2015
- No. of issues: 14

Creative team
- Created by: Brian Buccellato
- Written by: Brian Buccellato
- Artist(s): Toni Infante

Collected editions
- HC Book one #1-#5: ISBN 978-1632155528
- HC Book two #6-#10: ISBN 978-1632157218

Sons of the Devil is an ongoing creator-owned psychological horror genre American comic book series written by Brian Buccellato with art by Toni Infante. Image Comics began publication for Sons of the Devil on 27 May 2015. Brian Buccellato also created a short film to go along with the comics.

== Publication history ==
Sons of the Devil was crowd funded via the kickstarter website. 221 backers pledged $24,042 to bring the project to fruition.

== Plot ==
Sons of the Devil unfolds over three decades following Travis, just an average guy, until he discovers his family has ties to a deadly cult. Travis decides it's best to just move on with life, a friend is suspiciously murdered. Everything changed when his girlfriend drew the attention of a killer by chasing clues about Travis' family.

== Characters ==
=== Main characters ===
- Travis Crowe
- Melissa

=== Supporting characters ===
- Detective Wade Pope
- Henry Mills
- Tilly
- Vanessa

=== Antagonists ===
- David Daly
- Jennifer
- Eric Burton
- Dark Lord

=== Other characters ===
- Aaron Wilkes
- Seth
- Detective Young
- Klay Landon
- Robby Doyle

== In other media ==
=== Film ===
The Sons of the Devil kickstarter project also stated a 10-15 minute short film was produced to go along with the comics.

== Collected editions ==
Trade paperbacks
Title	Material collected	Publication date	ISBN
Sons of the Devil – Vol. One	Sons of the Devil #1–5	November 25, 2015	978-1632155528
Sons of the Devil – Vol. Two: Secrets and Lies	Sons of the Devil #6–10	October 12, 2016	978-1632157218
Sons of the Devil, Vol. 3	Sons of the Devil #11-14	September 20, 2017	978-1534303737
