= Adolf Born =

Czech painter, illustrator, filmmaker and caricaturist (1930–2016)

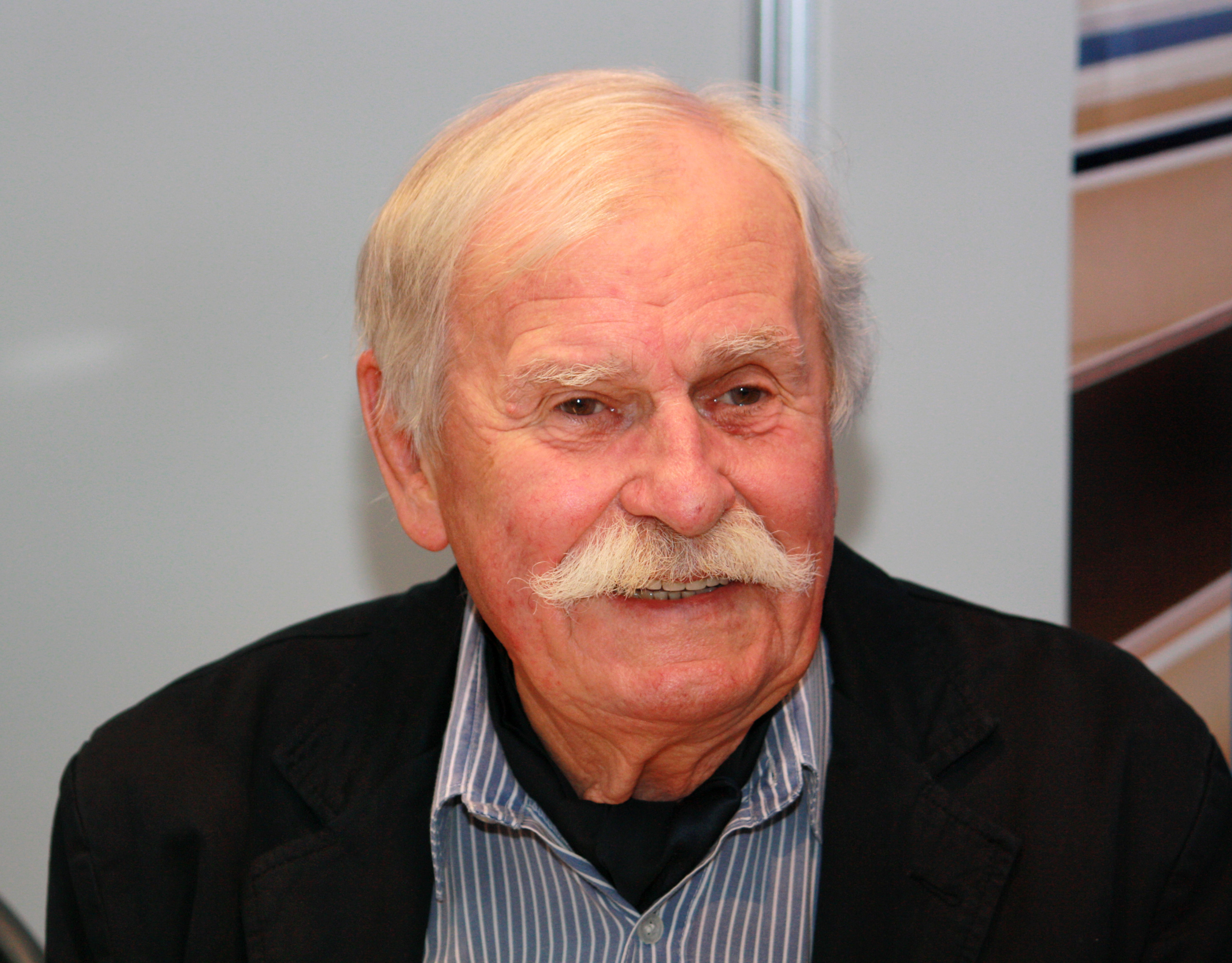
- Born: 12 June 1930; České Velenice, Czechoslovakia
- Died: 22 May 2016 (aged 85); Prague, Czech Republic
- Occupations: Painter, illustrator, caricaturist, filmmaker
- Spouse: married
- Children: 1
- Awards: 17806 Adolfborn; Medal of Merit (Czech Republic)

Adolf Born (12 June 1930 – 22 May 2016) was a Czech painter, illustrator, filmmaker and caricaturist, "known for his murkily-tinted pictures of bizarre fauna, and Victorian gentlemen in top hats and top coats". In recognition of his lasting contribution as a children's illustrator, Born was a finalist for the biennial, international Hans Christian Andersen Award in 2008. His various international rewards and honors also include the Grand Prix at the International Salon of Cartoons in Montreal and the Knight of the Order of Arts and Letters in France.

== Biography ==
Born was born in the town of České Velenice on the Bohemian side of the southern border with Austria, moving to Prague with his family in 1935. He received his visual arts education between 1949 and 1955 at the School of Applied Arts in Prague, in the Department of Caricature and Newspaper Drawing. Since the 1960s Born's works have been exhibited throughout the world. In 1966, in collaboration with Gene Deitch, Born animated the first ever screen adaptation of a work by J. R. R. Tolkien, The Hobbit. Initially better known to the public as a cartoonist published in magazines, censorship prompted him, from 1973 onwards, to focus more on animation and book illustrations. In 1974 Born was declared cartoonist of the year in Montreal, and he won the Palma d'Oro at the International Festival of the Humor of Bordighera, Italy.

One of the forms he specialised in was the bookplate (the "ex libris"), usually using colour lithography. He held over 100 exhibitions, illustrated hundreds of books, and designed many theatre sets and costumes.

He was married and had one daughter.

The asteroid 17806 Adolfborn, discovered by Petr Pravec at the Ondřejov Observatory, is named after him.

Born died on 22 May 2016, at the age of 85.

== Works ==
- Mach a Šebestová, a cartoon series
- Žofka a spol.
- Já, Baryk
- Dobrodružství, Robinson Crusoe
