= Who Wants to Kill Jessie? =

- Theatrical release poster by Kája Saudek
- Directed by: Václav Vorlíček
- Written by: Václav Vorlíček; Miloš Macourek
- Starring: Jiří Sovák; Dana Medřická; Olga Schoberová
- Release date: 26 August 1966
- Running time: 81 minutes
- Country: Czechoslovakia
- Language: Czech

Who Wants to Kill Jessie? (Czech: Kdo chce zabít Jessii?) is a 1966 Czechoslovak science fiction comedy film directed by Václav Vorlíček.

== Plot ==
The story focuses on a couple who use a machine which can bring objects and people from dreams to the real world. The main plot includes the accidental release of the comics character Jessie into the real world, and the film features many gags about the clash between the real world, and comics imagery such as word balloons and sound effects.

== Cast ==
- Dana Medřická as doc. Růženka Beránková
- Jiří Sovák as doc. Jindřich Beránek
- Olga Schoberová as Jessie
- Juraj Višný as Superman
- Karel Effa as Gunslinger
- Jan Libíček as Prison Guard
- Walter Taub as Professor
- Bedřich Prokoš as University Rector
- Ilja Racek as Beránková's colleague
- Otto Šimánek as Beránková's deputy

== Production ==
The comics illustrator Kája Saudek participated as the creator of special effects and illustrations for the film.

== Release ==
The film premiered on 26 August 1966.
