= Red Church (Brno) =

Protestant church in Brno, Czech Republic

Coordinates: 49.197689°N 16.603325°E

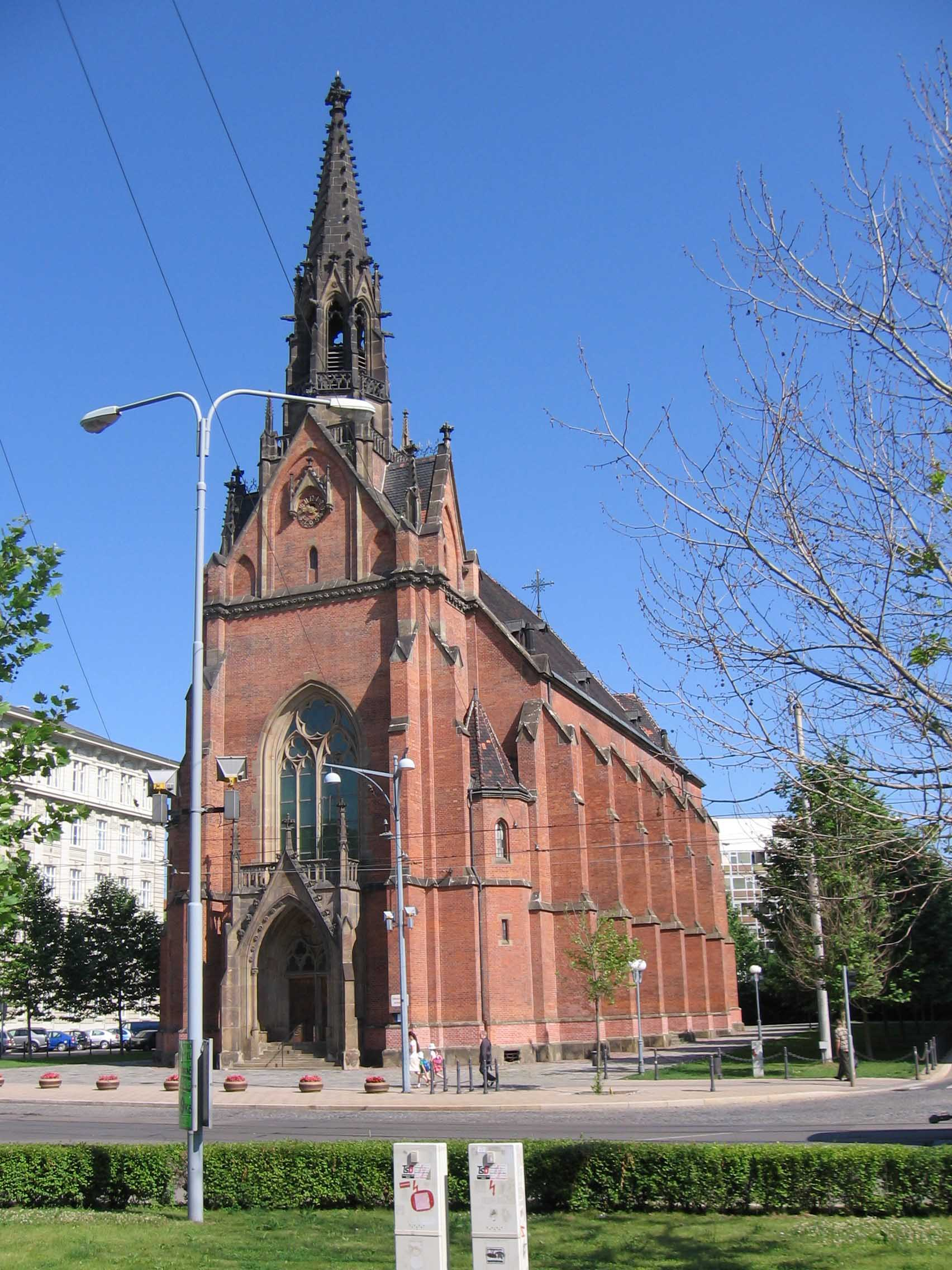
Red Church in Brno

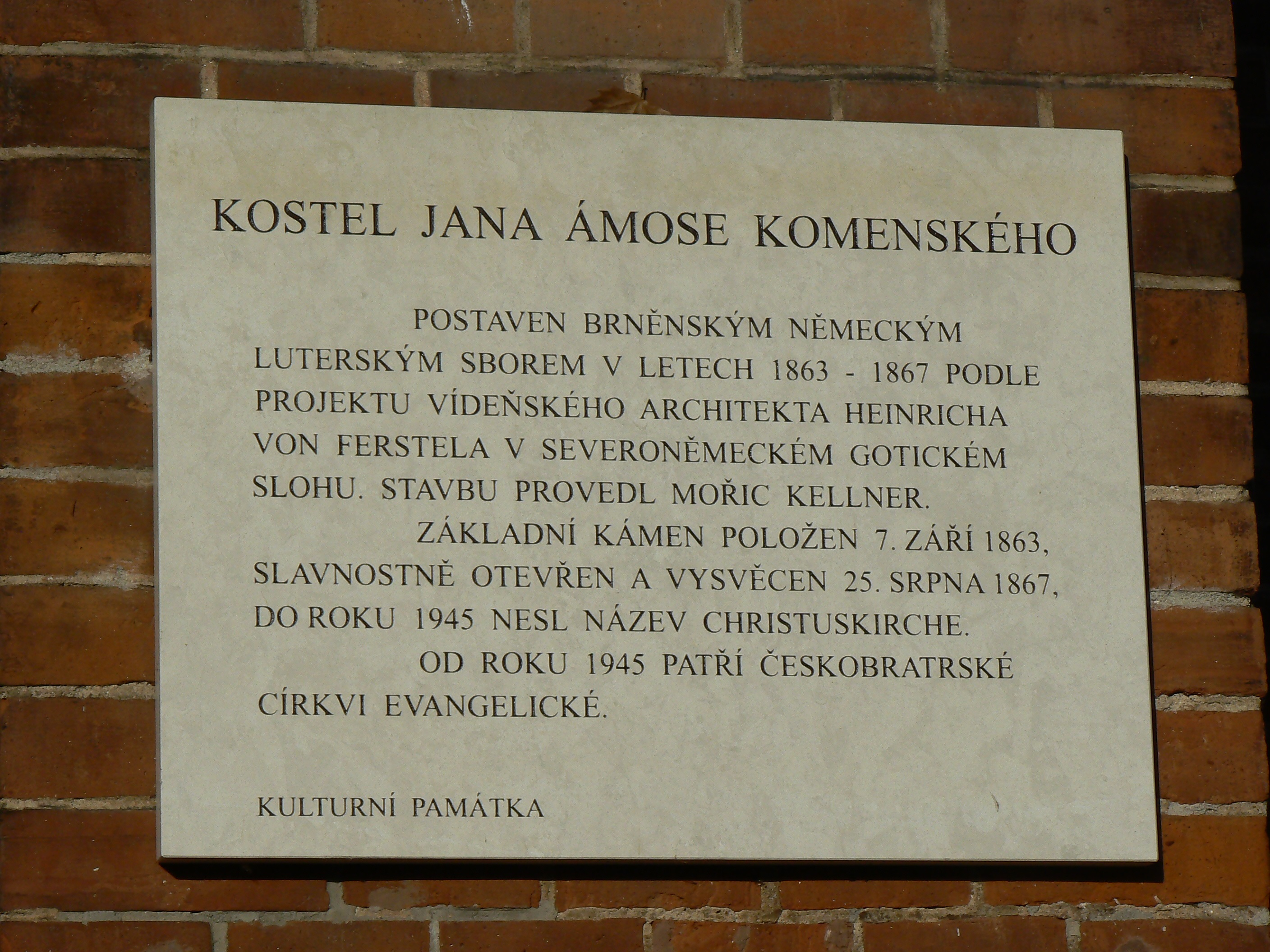
The memorial plaque on the church front wall

The Red Church (Czech: Červený kostel) is a Protestant Church in Brno, Czech Republic. It was designed by architect Heinrich von Ferstel and built up between 1863 and 1867. Nowadays it is used by the Evangelical Church of Czech Brethren. The building is a cultural monument.
