= Four Murders Are Enough, Darling =

1971 Czechoslovak comedy film

- Film poster
- Czech: Čtyři vraždy stačí, drahoušku
- Directed by: Oldřich Lipský
- Written by: Miloš Macourek; Oldřich Lipský
- Based on: Mrtvacima ulaz zabranjen by Nenad Brixy
- Starring: Lubomír Lipský; Jiřina Bohdalová; Iva Janžurová
- Cinematography: Jiří Tarantík
- Edited by: Miroslav Hájek
- Music by: Vlastimil Hála
- Production company: Filmové studio Barrandov
- Distributed by: Ústřední půjčovna filmů
- Release date: August 16, 1971 (Czechoslovakia)
- Running time: 107 minutes
- Country: Czechoslovakia
- Language: Czech

Four Murders Are Enough, Darling (Czech: Čtyři vraždy stačí, drahoušku) is a 1971 Czechoslovak action comedy film directed by Oldřich Lipský. It is an adaptation of the 1960 Croatian novel Entry Forbidden to The Dead (Croatian: Mrtvacima ulaz zabranjen) by Nenad Brixy, which had been previously adapted into a Yugoslav film, Mrtvima ulaz zabranjen, in 1965.

The film's plot involves a comedy of mistaken identity. An ordinary schoolteacher is mistaken for a killer. Two rival gangs are eager to hire him.

== Plot ==
The film setting is a fictional country in the Western world. The protagonist, George Camel, is a humble schoolteacher who is mistaken for a dangerous murderer. Subsequently, two criminal gangs vie for his services.

== Cast ==
- Lubomír Lipský as George Camel
- Jiřina Bohdalová as Sabrina
- Iva Janžurová as Kate Draxl
- Marie Rosůlková as Mrs. Harrington
- František Filipovský as Detective Sheridan
- Jan Libíček as Brooks
- Josef Hlinomaz as Gogo
- Karel Effa as Bar Owner Kovarski
- Lubomír Kostelka as Officer Davidson
- Vlastimil Hašek as Officer Harley
- Stella Zázvorková as Prostitute Peggy
- Josef Kemr as Zubatý (Tooth Man)
- Jaroslav Moučka as Gangster Tom
- František Peterka as Francis Owens
- Jan Přeučil as Henry
