= Mladý svět =

Czech weekly magazine

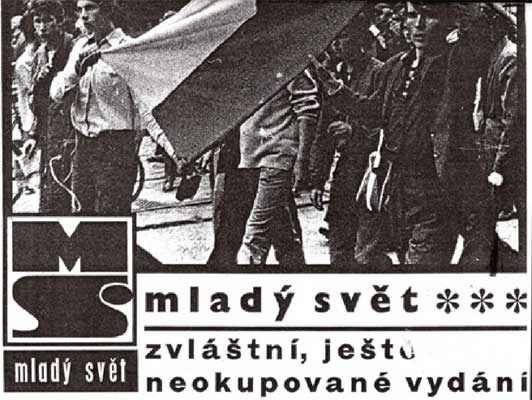
- Frequency: Weekly
- Founder: Czechoslovak Youth Union
- First issue: 1959
- Company: A11
- Country: Czech Republic
- Based in: Prague
- Language: Czech
- ISSN: 0323-2042

Mladý svět ("young world") is a popular weekly magazine published in Czechoslovakia from 1959 until 1989, and later in the Czech Republic until 2005, when it was merged into the magazine Instinkt. It contained photographs, editorials, comics, and other works. Mladý svět was revived in 2021 and continues to be published as of 2026.

== History ==
=== Communist era: 1959–1989 ===
Mladý svět was first published in 1959 by the Czechoslovak Youth Union in its purpose-built publishing house, Mladá fronta. In 1970, it was taken over by the Socialist Youth Union.

In 1972, the magazine published the comics Lips Tullian.

=== Post-Velvet Revolution: 1990–2005 ===
In 1990, Mladý svět was separated from the publishing house Mladá fronta, and it was registered as a joint-stock company, with Luboš Beniak, Jaroslav Dvořák, Michal Horáček, Jiří Janoušek, Rudolf Křesťan, Vladimír Lederer, and Vladimír Nagaj among its board of directors. Readership had declined following the 1989 Velvet Revolution, however, and the magazine teetered on the verge of extinction. In May 2005, after 46 years of publication, Mladý svět was merged into the magazine Instinkt, which ceased publication in 2019.

=== Revival: 2021–present ===
In November 2020, the Mladý svět name was purchased by the media company A11 from its previous owner, Empresa Media, and on 18 February 2021, it began to be published again as a weekly magazine.

== Enterprises ==
=== Bílá vrána award ===
Mladý svět presented the Bílá vrána award to young artists and writers who excelled in their respective field. Notable recipients include actor Bolek Polívka and writer Alexandra Berková (for her 1986 short story collection, Knížka s červeným obalem).

=== Zlatý slavík ===
In 1962, Mladý svět, together with the Slovak newspaper Sme, created the reader's music poll Zlatý slavík, which went on to become an annual award and was held until 1991, after which it was replaced by Český slavík.

=== Mr. Czechoslovakia ===
In 1970, the magazine organized the first national all-male beauty pageant, modelled on its female equivalent, Miss Czechoslovakia (launched in 1967), and appropriately titled Mr. Czechoslovakia.

== Notable staff and contributors ==
The writer and feuilletonist Rudolf Křesťan worked as an editor of Mladý svět from 1964 to 1993.

The journalists Radek John and Josef Velek were active at the magazine, as were photographers Oldřich Škácha, Pavel Dias, and Karel Cudlín. The illustrator Vladimír Jiránek was a frequent contributor.

== Predecessor ==
A weekly newspaper for young people, also titled Mladý svět, was published from 1929 until 1945. Several vintage editions are available online.
