= Rudolf Křesťan =

Czech writer, editor and feuilletonist (1943–2026)

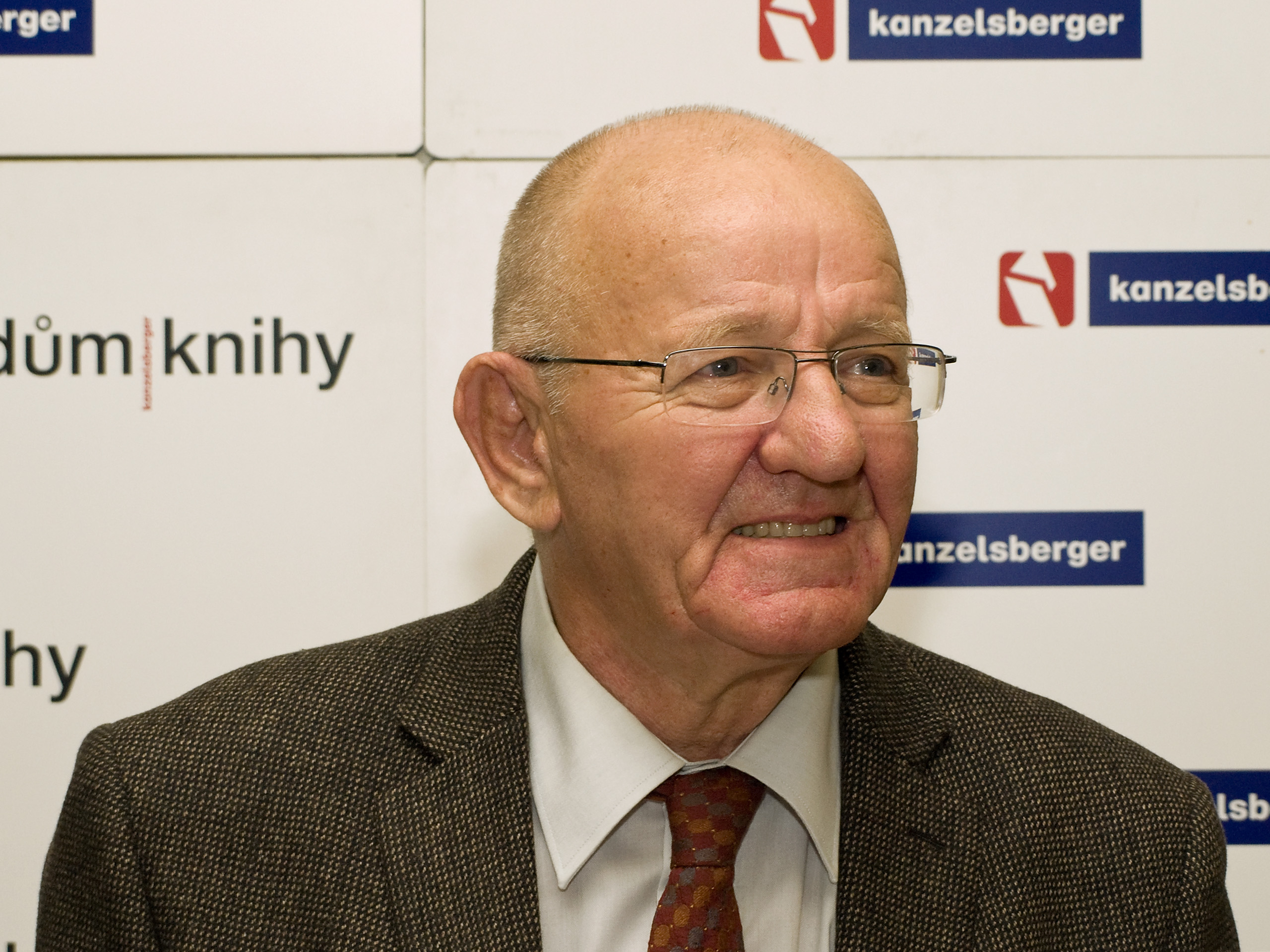
Rudolf Křesťan in 2010.

Rudolf Křesťan (14 March 1943 – 15 October 2026) was a Czech writer, editor and feuilletonist. He was the author of 16 books, printed in more than 250,000 copies.

== Life and career ==
Křesťan was born on 14 March 1943. He spent his childhood in Stará Role near Karlovy Vary. From 1960 to 1966 he studied at the Institut osvěty a novinářství (Faculty of Journalism) of the Charles University in Prague. From 1964 to 1993 he worked as an editor in the Mladý svět magazine. After that, he was engaged in the Týdeník Televize. From 2003, he worked as a freelance writer. During his career, he collaborated both with Czech Television and Czech Radio.

Křesťan died on 15 October 2026, at the age of 83.

== Bibliography ==
Křesťan was known mainly as a feuilletonist. During his career, he wrote more than 1,000 feuilletons. He selected 33 of his best feuilletons for an audiobook published in 2009.

- Kos a kosínus (1969) – in collaboration with Vladimír Renčín
- Budeš v novinách (1976) – in collaboration with František Gel
- Myš v 11. patře (1980)
- Slepičí krok (1986)
- Kočky v patách (1990)
- Co láká poškoláka (1991) – illustrated by Vladimír Renčín
- Jak se do lesa volá (1992) – illustrated by Vladimír Renčín
- Jak jsem si užil (1995)
- Pozor, hodný pes! (1997)
- Nebuď labuť! (1999)
- Výlov mého rybníka (2000)
- Podkovaná blecha (2002)
- Kachna v bazénu (2004)
- Tandem aneb po dvou ve dvou (2006)
- Jsem z toho jelen (2008)
- Co jsem si nadrobil aneb Sypání ptáčkům (2010)
