= Olga Schoberová =

Czech-American actress

- Born: March 15, 1943 (age 83); Prague, Protectorate of Bohemia and Moravia
- Other name: Olinka Bérová
- Occupation: Actress
- Years active: 1963–1984
- Spouse(s): Brad Harris (m. 1967; div. 1969) John Calley (m. 1972; div. 1992)
- Children: 1

Olga Schoberová (born March 15, 1943), also known as Olinka Bérová, is a Czech actress. She acted in Czech, German, Italian, Austrian, Polish, English, and American movies. As "Olinka Berova", she appeared in The Vengeance of She (1968), and several more films. Schoberová has been compared to Brigitte Bardot and Ursula Andress. She is fluent in Czech, English, German and Russian.

== Early life ==
Olga Schoberová was born 15 March 1943 in Prague. Both of her parents were clerks. She graduated from the High School of Economics.

== Career ==
After graduation Schoberová worked as a clerk at the Technomat, for CZK 500 per month. Her older sister Eva was a model. Since Eva was quite busy as a model, Eva once sent Olga, who looked very similar to her, to a modeling job. Olga then started shooting commercials. A Pilsner beer poster with 20 year old Olga attracted the attention of director Antonín Kachlík, who cast her in the movie We Were Ten (1963). Soon after she was cast in many popular Czech movies, including Lemonade Joe or Who Wants to Kill Jessie?.

In 1964, Schoberová appeared on the cover of Playboy magazine, photographed by Herman Leonard. In 1969, Schoberová appeared in Playboy again, this time in the pictorial, Sex Stars of 1969. Schoberová appeared with her future husband Brad Harris in The Secret of the Chinese Carnation, (1964), and Massacre at Marble City (1964). After she married John Calley in 1972 she essentially retired from acting. She only returned in 1977 in Dinner for Adele and 1984 in Vrak.

== Personal life ==
In the early 1960s, Olga dated artist Kája Saudek. Saudek advised her to bleach her hair blonde and based his comics character Jessie on her.

In 1967, Schoberová married actor Brad Harris, who she met during filming of Poppea's Hot Nights. Their daughter, Sabrina, is a stylist and costume designer. Olga became romantically involved with Juraj Jakubisko while she was still married. She and Harris divorced in 1969.

Olga met producer John Calley at Barbra Streisand's party. They got married on December 30, 1972, and divorced almost exactly 20 years later, in December 1992.

She then lived in France and later returned to Prague.

Her elder sister, Eva, was born on July 8, 1940. They grew up in Vinohrady, Prague. She worked as a hairdresser, a model and an actress, until 1970, when she left the Czechoslovak Socialist Republic, married a doctor, and lives in Switzerland.

== Filmography ==
- We Were Ten (1963) (Bylo nás deset)
- Ikarie XB-1 (1963)
- Náboj (cs) (1963)
- Lemonade Joe (1964)
- The Secret of the Chinese Carnation (1964)
- Massacre at Marble City (1964)
- Black Eagle of Santa Fe (1965)
- Who Wants to Kill Jessie? (1966)
- Count Bobby, The Terror of The Wild West (1966)
- Kommissar X – Drei grüne Hunde (1967)
- The 25th Hour (1967)
- Prague - The Sad City (26 September 1968) British Pathé News
- Olinka Berova at Home (1968) British Pathé News
- The Vengeance of She (1968)
- Lucrezia (1968)
- Poppea's Hot Nights (1969)
- Maniacs on Wheels|Formula 1 - Nell'Inferno del Grand Prix|it (1970)
- You Are a Widow, Sir (1970)
- Togetherness (1970)
- Dinner for Adele (1977)
- See You in Hell, Friends (1990)
