= 1985 in Spanish television =

This is a list of Spanish television related events in 1985.

== Events ==
- 4 May: Paloma San Basilio represents Spain at the Eurovision Song Contest 1985, hold in Gothenburg ranking 14th with her song "La fiesta terminó" receiving 36 points.
- 24 July: Televisión de Galicia, Galicia's Regional Television channel, is launched.
- 21 September: Televisión Española stages in Seville the OTI Festival 1985, which is broadcast live throughout Ibero-America.
- 16 November – The program Informe Semanal broadcasts the documentary on the eruption of Armero tragedy and the agony of Omayra Sánchez, that shocks the whole Spanish people.

== Debuts ==
Title	Channel	Debut	Performers/Host	Genre
A media tarde	La 1	1985-11-03	Antonio Iranzo	Children
A pleno sol	La 2	1985-01-20	Gonzalo Sebastián de Erice	Cultural/Science
Agenda informativa	La 2	1985-12-01		News
Así es la ópera	La 1	1985-04-25		Music
Auambabuluba balambambú	La 2	1985-04-18	Carlos Tena	Music
Ayer y hoy de la aviación	La 1	1985-01-12		Documentary
Búscate la vida	La 2	1985-10-01	Montserrat Roig	Youth
Cantantes y sonantes	La 1	1985-10-13	Maite Fernández	Music
Carreras de caballos	La 1	1985-04-07		Sport
Como Pedro por su casa	La 1	1985-05-17	Pedro Ruiz	Variety show
De la mano de...	La 1	1985-07-07	Jordi López-Pedrol	Music
De siete en siete	La 1	1985-07-07	Cristina Higueras	Variety show
Diario de sesiones	La 1	1985-10-13	María Teresa Campos	News
Domingo cine	La 2	1985-10-05		Movies
El año en que nacimos	La 2	1985-04-14		Quiz show
El baile	La 1	1985-06-24	Marisa Paredes	Theatre
El ojo del vídeo	La 2	1985-01-20		Documentary
En el umbral de Europa	La 1	1985-10-03	José García Abad	Documentary
En la cuerda floja	La 2	1985-07-23	El Gran Wyoming	Comedy
En marcha	La 2	1985-05-06	Eva Nasarre	Sport
Entre amigos	La 1	1985-07-05	José Luis Moreno	Variety show
Esto es increíble	La 1	1985-04-29		Variety show
Esto es lo que hay	La 1	1985-02-09	El Gran Wyoming	Variety show
Fin de siglo	La 2	1985-10-09	Pablo Lizcano	Talk show
Generación 800	La 1	1985-04-28	Isabel Borondo	Cultural/Science
Goya	La 1	1985-05-13	Enric Majó	Drama series
Grand Prix: Así es la fórmula 1	La 1	1985-04-28	Paco Costas	Sport
La aventura humana	La 1	1985-09-29	Alberto Oliveras	Documentary
Las capitales culturales de Europa	La 1	1985-07-14		Documentary
La comedia musical española	La 1	1985-10-01	Concha Velasco	Music
Las cuentas claras	La 1	1985-01-02	Luis Maluenga	Cultural/Science
La huella del crimen	La 1	1985-04-12	Sancho Gracia	Drama series
Los Electroduendes	La 1	1985-05-19		Children
Los pazos de Ulloa	La 1	1985-12-09	Charo López	Drama series
Metrópolis	La 2	1985-04-21		Cultural
Mujeres para una época	La 2	1985-05-05		Documentary
Música para usted	La 2	1985-09-27		Music
Otros lugares, otros caminos	La 1	1985-02-03		Documentary
Página de sucesos	La 1	1985-10-25	Patxi Andion	Drama series
Parques nacionales	La 1	1985-05-26		Documentary
Platos rotos	La 1	1985-10-02	María José Alfonso	Sitcom
Punto de encuentro	La 1	1985-07-07	Pedro Macía	Variety show
Punto y aparte	La 1	1985-01-07	Manuel Campo Vidal	News
¿Qué pintamos aquí?	La 2	1985-10-08	Francisco Rabal	Cultural/Science
Si lo sé no vengo	La 1	1985-06-13	Jordi Hurtado	Quiz show
Suspiros de España	La 2	1985-07-02	Gonzalo Sebastián de Erice	News
Tatuaje	La 2	1985-04-10	José-Miguel Ullán	Music
The World of David the Gnome	La 1	1985-10-26		Cartoon
Tiempo de creer	La 2	1985-01-25		Religion
Veraneantes	La 1	1985-01-07	María Luisa San José	Drama series
Verano 8.30 pm magazine	La 1	1985-07-01	Casilda Aguirre	Variety show

== Television shows ==
=== La 1 ===
- Telediario (1957– )
- Un, dos, tres... responda otra vez (1972–2004)
- Estudio estadio (1972–2005)
- Informe Semanal (1973– )
- Gente joven (1976–1987)
- Parlamento (1978–2014)
- Vivir cada día (1978–1988)
- Más vale prevenir (1979–1987)
- Barrio Sésamo (1979–2000)
- Consumo (1981–1987)
- ¿Un Mundo feliz? (1981–1987)
- El Arte de vivir (1982–1987)
- De película (1982–1991)
- Al mil por mil (1983–1986)
- Dentro de un orden (1983–1986)
- Planeta imaginario (1983–1986)
- Tocata (1983–1987)
- La Tarde (1983–1989)
- Otros pueblos (1983–2007)
- Al galope (1984–1986)
- Letra pequeña (1984–1986)
- Los Sabios (1984–1986)
- Ahí te quiero ver (1984–1987)
- Hola chicos (1984–1987)
- El Kiosco (1984–1987)
- Un País de sagitario (1984–1987)
- La Bola de Cristal (1984–1988)
- Con las manos en la masa (1984–1991)
- Los Marginados (1984–1991)

=== La 2 ===
- Al filo de lo imposble (1982– )
- Pueblo de Dios (1982– )
- Últimas preguntas (1983– )
- En portada (1984– )
- La Noche del cine español (1984–1986)
- Tablón de anuncios (1984–1986)
- Jazz entre amigos (1984–1991)
- Estadio 2 (1984–2007)

== Ending this year ==
=== La 1 ===
- Pista libre (1982–1985)
- Y sin embargo, te quiero (1983–1985)
- Autorretrato (1984–1985)
- Cremallera (1984–1985)
- Disco visto (1984–1985)

=== La 2 ===
- Estudio abierto (1970–1985)
- La Edad de oro (1983–1985)
- Puesta a punto (1983–1985)
- Si yo fuera presidente (1983–1985)

== Foreign series debuts in Spain ==
English title	Spanish title	Original title	Channel	Country	Performers
1915	1915		La 1	AUS	Scott McGregor
Arabela	Arabela	Arabela	La 1	TCH	Jana Nagyová
Bergerac	Bergerac		FORTA	USA	John Nettles
Blue Thunder	El Trueno Azul		La 1	USA	James Farentino
Brass	Coraje		La 2	UK	Timothy West
Chessgame	Partida de ajedrez		La 1	UK	Terence Stamp
Chiefs	Jefes		La 1	USA	Charlton Heston
Chocky	Chocky		La 1	UK	James Hazeldine
Dancin' Days	Dancin' Days	Dancin' Days	FORTA	BRA	Sônia Braga
Dungeons & Dragons	Dragones y mazmorras		La 1	USA	
Falcon Crest	Falcon Crest		La 1	USA	Jane Wyman
Father Murphy	El Padre Murphy		La 1	USA	Merlin Olsen
Father's Day	El día del pare (CAT)		FORTA	UK	John Alderton
Fraggle Rock	Los Fraguel		La 2	USA	
Heathcliff	Isidoro		La 1	USA	
Highway to Heaven	Autopista hacia el cielo		La 1	USA	Michael Landon, Victor French
Knight Rider	El coche fantástico		La 1	USA	David Hasselhoff
--	Los unos y los otros	Les Uns et les Autres	La 1	FRA	James Caan
Lucky Luke	Lucky Luke		La 1	USA	
Magnum, P.I.	Magnum		FORTA	USA	Tom Selleck
Masquerade	Mascarada		La 1	USA	Rod Taylor, Kirstie Alley, Greg Evigan
Mike Hammer	Mike Hammer		La 1	USA	Stacy Keach
Miss Marple	Miss Marple		La 1	UK	Joan Hickson
Partners in Crime	Unidos frente al delito		La 1	UK	Francesca Annis, James Warwick
Master Eder and his Pumuckl	Pumuky	Meister Eder und sein Pumuckl	La 1	GER	Gustl Bayrhammer
Princess Daisy	La princesa Daisy		La 1	USA	Merete Van Kamp
Quo Vadis?	Quo Vadis?	Quo Vadis?	La 1	ITA	Klaus Maria Brandauer
–	Reina Bona	Królowa Bona	La 1	POL	Aleksandra Śląska
Return to Eden	Retorno a Edén		La 1	AUS	Rebecca Gilling
Salem's Lot	El misterio de Salem's Lot		La 1	USA	David Soul, James Mason
Seven Brides for Seven Brothers	Siete novias para siete hermanos		La 1	USA	Richard Dean Anderson
Some Mothers Do 'Ave 'Em	N'hi ha que neixen estrellats (CAT)		FORTA	UK	Michael Crawford
–	Historia de amor y amistad	Storia d'amore e d'amicizia	La 1	ITA	Claudio Amendola
Strangers	Extraños		La 1	USA	Don Henderson
Taotao	Taotao	Tao Tao Ehonkan	La 2	JAP	
The A-Team	El equipo A		La 1	USA	G.Peppard, D.Benedict, D.Schultz, Mr. T
The Biskitts	Los Biskitts		La 1	USA	
The Buddenbrooks	Los Budenbrook	Die Buddenbrooks	La 2	GER	Ursula Dirichs
The Duchess of Duke Street	La duquesa de Duke Street		FORTA	UK	Gemma Jones
The Gangster Chronicles	Crónicas de gangsters		La 1	USA	Michael Nouri
The Irish R.M.	El magistrado inglés		La 1	UK IRE	Peter Bowles
The Jewel in the Crown	La joya de la corona		La 1	UK	Peggy Ashcroft
The Last Days of Pompeii	Los últimos días de Pompeya		La 1	USA ITA	Franco Nero, Lesley-Anne Down
The Last Place on Earth	El último lugar de la Tierra		La 1	UK	Martin Shaw
The Life of Verdi	Verdi	Verdi	La 1	ITA	Ronald Pickup
The Martian Chronicles	Crónicas marcianas		La 1	USA	Rock Hudson
The Mystic Warrior	El guerrero místico		La 1	USA	Robert Beltran
The Puppy's Further Adventures	Las aventuras del cachorro Puppy		La 1	USA	
The Thorn Birds	El pájaro espino		La 1	USA	Richard Chamberlain
The Wonderful Adventures of Nils	Nils Holgersson	Nirusu no Fushigi na Tabi	La 2	JAP	
The Yellow Rose	La rosa amarilla		La 1	USA	Sam Elliott, David Soul, Cybill Shepherd
V	V		La 1	USA	Marc Singer, Jane Badler, Faye Grant

== Births ==
- 5 January – Matías Prats Chacón, sport journalist.
- 10 January – Martín Rivas, actor.
- 18 March – Alba Lago, hostess.
- 21 April – Diego Losada Gómez, host.
- 14 June – Flora González López, hostess.
- 19 June – Sandra Cervera, actress.
- 6 September – Jordi Coll, actor.
- 6 October – Pepa Rus, actress.
- 22 December – Edurne, singer, hostess & jury member.

== Deaths ==
- 26 March – José Bódalo, actor, 69.

== See also ==
- 1985 in Spain
- List of Spanish films of 1985
