= 1984 in Spanish television =

This is a list of Spanish television related events in 1984.

== Events ==
- 16 January: TV3, Catalonia's Regional Television channel is launched. It is the second time a Television Network other than the State-owned TVE broadcasts in Spain, after Euskal Telebista.
- 5 May: Bravo represent Spain at the Eurovision Song Contest 1984, hold in Luxembourg ranking 3rd with their song Lady, Lady which receives 106 points.

== Debuts ==
Title	Channel	Debut	Performers/Host	Genre
A ciencia cierta	La 2	1984-10-07	Esteban Sánchez- Ocaña	Cultural/Science
A la caza del tesoro	La 1	1984-01-08	Miguel de la Quadra-Salcedo	Game show
A media noche	La 2	1984-09-30		
A mil por mil	La 1	1984-01-23	Javier Vázquez	Sport
Agenda	La 2	1984-01-15		Variety show
Ahí te quiero ver	La 1	1984-10-04	Rosa María Sardà	Talk show
Al aire libre	La 2	1984-01-31	Miguel del Pino	Cultural/Science
Al galope	La 1	1984-01-06	Daniel Vindel	Sport
Arco iris	La 2	1984-01-22	Miguel Ángel Oyarbide	Cultural/Science
Arte y tradiciones populares	La 2	1984-09-30		Cultural/Science
Autorretrato	La 1	1984-01-17	Pablo Lizcano	Talk show
Con las manos en la masa	La 2	1984-01-10	Elena Santonja	Cooking show
Concierto sentido	La 1	1984-01-05		Music
Cosas de dos	La 1	1984-02-23	Nicolás Dueñas	Drama series
Cremallera	La 1	1984-08-20	Juan José Guerenabarrena	Youth
Cuentos imposibles	La 1	1984-10-02	Joaquín Kremel	Drama series
De cara al mundo	La 1	1984-01-12		News
De Olimpia a Los Ángeles	La 1	1984-01-25	Francisco Fernández Ochoa	Sport
Disco visto	La 1	1984-10-04	María Nelson	Music
Dos en raya	La 2	1984-10-07	Mireia Sentís	Talk show
El kiosco	La 1	1984-08-16	Verónica Mengod	Children
En portada	La 1	1984-01-05		News
España en la Antártida	La 2	1984-12-23		Documentary
España, historia inmediata	La 1	1984-01-08		Documentary
Estadio 2	La 2	1984-12-03	Pedro Barthe	Sport
Estudio directo	La 1	1984-04-01	Marías Prats	Sport
Formatos	La 2	1984-04-15	Elena Gutiérrez	Variety show
Fragmentos de interior	La 1	1984-04-24	Emma Suárez	Drama series
Hablemos de amor	La 2	1984-07-07	Margarita Riviere	Variety show
Hola chicos	La 1	1984-02-03	María Luisa Seco	Children
Informativo Juvenil	La 1	1984-09-30	Francisco García Novell	Youth
Jazz entre amigos	La 2	1985-10-02	Juan Claudio Cifuentes	Music
La bola de cristal	La 1	1984-10-06	Olvido Gara	Children
La cueva de los cerrojos	La 1	1984-10-07	Ricardo Cordón	Children
La noche del cine español	La 2	1984-01-09	Fernando Méndez Leite	Movies
La plaza del Diamante	La 1	1984-01-06	Silvia Munt	Drama series
La próxima semana	La 1	1984-07-02	Paula Gardoqui	Variety show
La ventana electrónica	La 2	1984-01-28		
Around the World with Willy Fog	La 1	1984-01-08		Cartoon
Leo contra todos	La 2	1984-01-15	Rita Irasema	Variety show
Letra pequeña	La 1	1984-08-19	Isabel Tenaille	Variety show
Los marginados	La 1	1984-10-01	Carmen Sarmiento	News
Los padres de nuestros padres	La 2	1984-01-08	Monsterrat Roig	Variety show
Los Sabios	La 1	1984-06-02	Isabel Garbí	Children
Ninette y un señor de Murcia	La 1	1984-10-25	Victoria Vera	Drama series
Nunca es tarde	La 1	1984-05-29	Irene Gutiérrez Caba	Drama series
Objetivo 92	La 1	1984-09-09		Sport
Planeta imaginario	La 1	1984-04-05	José María Gimeno	Children
¿Pop que?	La 2	1984-07-23	Carlos Tena	Quiz show
Proceso a Mariana Pineda	La 1	1984-11-13	Pepa Flores	Drama series
Silencio, se juega	La 2	1984-10-01	El Gran Wyoming	Quiz show
Superstar	La 1	1984-04-27	Norma Duval	Variety show
Tablón de anuncios	La 2	1984-04-01	Sonia Grande	Variety show
Teleobjetivo	La 1	1984-12-21	Baltasar Magro	News
Teresa de Jesús	La 1	1984-03-12	Concha Velasco	Drama series
Tiempo para el deporte	La 2	1984-11-23		Sport
Tiempos modernos	La 2	1984-11-14	Miguel Rubio	Cultural/Science
Un país de Sagitario	La 1	1984-10-18	Silvia Arlet	Variety show
Viento, madera y barro	La 1	1984-07-16	Miguel de los Santos	Documentary

== Television shows ==
=== La 1 ===
- Telediario (1957– )
- Un, dos, tres... responda otra vez (1972–2004)
- Estudio estadio (1972–2005)
- Informe Semanal (1973– )
- Gente joven (1976–1987)
- Parlamento (1978–2014)
- Vivir cada día (1978–1988)
- Más vale prevenir (1979–1987)
- Barrio Sésamo (1979–2000)
- Consumo (1981–1987)
- ¿Un Mundo feliz? (1981–1987)
- Pista libre (1982–1985)
- El Arte de vivir (1982–1987)
- De película (1982–1991)
- Y sin embargo, te quiero (1983–1985)
- Al mil por mil (1983–1986)
- Dentro de un orden (1983–1986)
- Planeta imaginario (1983–1986)
- Tocata (1983–1987)
- La Tarde (1983–1989)
- Otros pueblos (1983–2007)

=== La 2 ===
- Estudio abierto (1970–1985)
- Al filo de lo imposble (1982– )
- Pueblo de Dios (1982– )
- Últimas preguntas (1983– )
- La Edad de oro (1983–1985)
- Puesta a punto (1983–1985)
- Si yo fuera presidente (1983–1985)

== Ending this year ==
=== La 1 ===
- Buenas noches (1982–1984)
- En paralelo (1982–1984)
- Encuentros en libertad (1982–1984)
- Nosotros (1982–1984)
- Usted, por ejemplo (1982–1984)
- La Comedia (1983–1984)
- Como lo ves (1983–1984)
- Las Cortes de España (1983–1984)
- Fila 7 (1983–1984)
- Ni en vivo ni en directo (1983–1984)
- Última frontera (1983–1984)

=== La 2 ===
- La víspera de nuestro tiempo (1981–1984)
- La Puerta del misterio (1982–1984)
- El Jardín de Venus 1983–1984)

== Foreign series debuts in Spain ==
English title	Spanish title	Original title	Channel	Country	Performers
Adventures of Huckleberry Finn	Aventuras en el Mississipi	Huckleberry no Bōken	La 2	JAP	
All for Love	Todo por amor		La 1	UK	
Andy Robson	Andy Robson		La 1	UK	Tom Davidson
Bring 'Em Back Alive	Traedlos vivos		La 1	USA	Bruce Boxleitner
Candy Candy	Candy Candy	Kyandi Kyandi	La 2	JAP	
CBS Library	Libros de aventuras		La 1	USA	
–	La cartuja de Parma	La certosa di Parma	La 2	ITA	Marthe Keller
For the Term of his Natural Life	Para el resto de sus días		La 1	AUS	Colin Friels
Goliath Awaits	Goliath está esperando		La 1	USA	Mark Harmon
Haywire	Tensión familiar		La 2	USA	Lee Remick
Hotel	Hotel		La 1	USA	James Brolin, Connie Selleca
Inspector Gadget	Inspector Gadget	Inspecteur Gadget	La 1	FRA	
Isaura the Slave Girl	La esclava Isaura	Escrava Isaura	FORTA	BRA	Lucélia Santos
Kennedy	Kennedy		La 1	USA	Martin Sheen
L for Lester	Prácticas con Lester		La 1	UK	Brian Murphy
Let There Be Love	Deja paso al amor		La 2	UK	Paul Eddington
Little Lulu and Her Little Friends	La pequeña Lulú	Ritoru Ruru to Chitchai Nakama	La 1	JAP	
Masada	Masada		La 1	USA	Peter O'Toole, Peter Strauss
Master of the Game	El amo del juego		La 1	USA	Dyan Cannon
Minder	Minder		La 2	UK	Dennis Waterman
Nana	Nana	Nana	La 1	FRA	Véronique Genest
Power Without Glory	Poder sin gloria		La 1	AUS	Martin Vaughan
–	Quien ama no mata	Quem Ama Não Mata	La 1	BRA	Marília Pêra
Reilly, Ace of Spies	Reilly, el as de espías		La 1	UK	Sam Neill
Runaway Island	La isla de los fugitivos		La 1	AUS	Miles Buchanan
Sara Dane	Sara Dane		La 1	USA	Juliet Jordan
Secret Squirrel	Inspector Ardilla		La 1	USA	
Secret Army	El ejército secreto		FORTA	UK	Bernard Hepton
Shogun	Shogun		La 1	USA	Richard Chamberlain
Smiley's People	Los hombres de Smilley		La 1	USA	Alec Guinness
Tales of the Gold Monkey	Cuentos del mono de oro		La 1	USA	Stephen Collins, Caitlin O'Heaney
–	Tiempo de paz	Le temps d'une paix	La 2	CAN	Nicole Leblanc
The Blue and the Gray	Azules y grises		La 1	USA	Stacy Keach
The Citadel	La ciudadela		La 1	UK	Ben Cross
The Chisholms	Los Chisholms		La 1	USA	Robert Preston, Rosemary Harris
The Devlin Connection	El contacto Devlin		La 1	USA	Rock Hudson, Jack Scalia
The Fall and Rise of Reginald Perrin	Caída y auge de Reginald Perrin		La 1	UK	Leonard Rossiter
The Fourth Arm	El cuarto brazo		La 1	UK	Paul Shelley
The Greatest American Hero	El gran héroe americano		La 1	USA	William Katt, Connie Selleca, Robert Culp
The Living Planet	Planeta Viviente		La 1	UK	David Attenborough
The Many Wives of Patrick	Demasiadas esposas para Patrick		La 1	UK	Patrick Cargill
The Professionals	Los profesionales		FORTA	UK	Gordon Jackson
To the Manor Born	Hostes vingueren que de casa ens tragueren (CAT)		FORTA	UK	Penelope Keith
The Pirate	El pirata		La 1	USA	Franco Nero
The Scarlett O'Hara War	Moviola		La 1	USA	Tony Curtis
The Winds of War	Vientos de guerra		La 1	USA	Robert Mitchum, Ali MacGraw, Jan-Michael Vincent
Westwate	Westgate		La 1	USA	Eckard Rabe
Widows	Las viudas		La 1	UK	Ann Mitchell
Yes Minister	Sí ministro		FORTA	UK	Paul Eddington

== Births ==
- 24 January – Belén Cuesta, actress
- 3 February –
  - Sara Carbonero, journalist
  - Silvia Laplana, meteorologist
- 15 June – Javier Hernández, actor
- 18 June – Sara Rancaño, journalist
- 22 June – José Yélamo, journalist
- 24 June – Javier Ambrossi, actor, producer and director
- 6 July – Andrea Ropero, journalist
- 14 July – Adriana Abenia, actress & hostess.
- 30 July – Marco Martínez, actor
- 16 August – Sofía Nieto, actress
- 18 August – David Carrillo, actor & host
- 20 October – Elio González, actor
- 28 December – Maggie Civantos, actress
- 30 December – David Broncano, host
- Cristina Cruz Mínguez, actress
- Sara Rancaño, journalist

== Deaths ==
- 13 April – Mary Delgado, actress, 67
- 23 August – Héctor Quiroga, journalist, 51
- 10 September – Ismael Merlo, actor, 66

== See also ==
- List of Spanish films of 1984
