= Josef Dvořák =

Czech actor (born 1942)

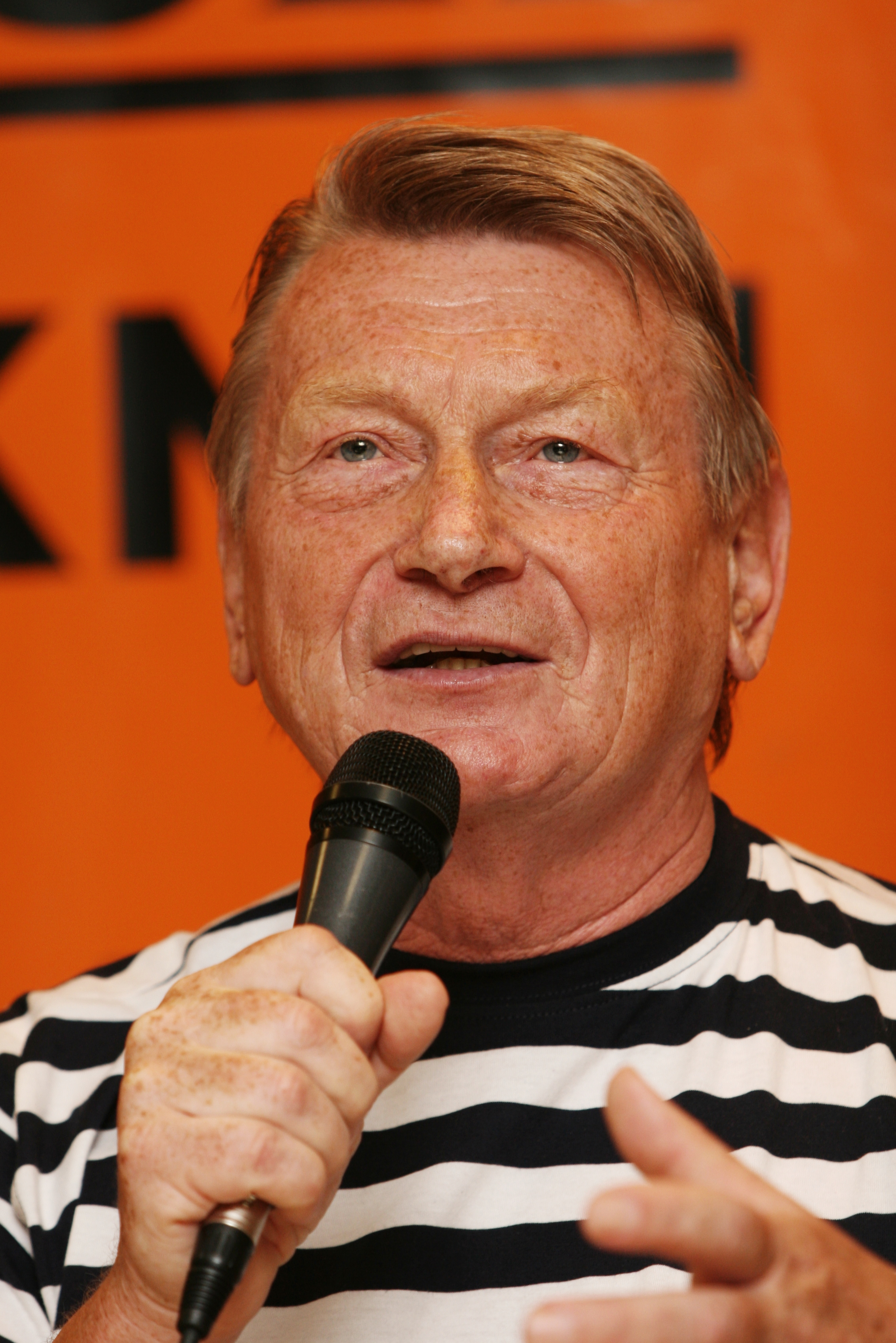
- Dvořák in 2008
- Born: 25 April 1942 (age 83); Horní Cerekev, Protectorate of Bohemia and Moravia
- Occupation: Actor
- Website: josefdvorak.cz

Josef Dvořák (born 25 April 1942) is a Czech stage, television, and film actor. He began his career in Kadaň, from where he went to Kladivadlo in Ústí nad Labem. He worked at Semafor theatre in Prague from 1972 to 1990. In 1990, he established his own theatre company, Divadelní společnost Josefa Dvořáka. He has appeared in the role of a vodník on several occasions.

According to available records, Dvořák was a Czechoslovak secret police force confidant, providing information about events at Semafor, particularly about actor and writer Jiří Suchý. Dvořák has denied and refused to comment on this.

== Selected filmography ==
=== Film ===
List of film appearances, with year, title, and role shown
Year	Title	Role
1974	Jáchyme, hoď ho do stroje!	Bedřich Hudeček
1976	Parta hic	Kubík
1978	Monkey's Playtime	Homola
1992	Černí baroni	Lieutenant Mazurek

=== Television ===
List of television appearances, with year, title, and role shown
Year	Title	Role	Notes
1972	Byli jednou dva písaři	Stableman	4 episodes
1976–1977	Maxipes Fík	Narrator	Animated; 13 episodes
1977	Pan Tau	Jan Kalous	3 episodes
1978–1981	Hospital at the End of the City	Václav Pěnkava	12 episodes
1981	Arabela	Vodník	5 episodes
1983	Návštěvníci	Leo Kane / Emil Karas	15 episodes
1983	Létající Čestmír	Researcher	3 episodes
1983	Divoké sny Maxipsa Fíka	Narrator	Animated; 3 episodes
1985	Rozpaky kuchaře Svatopluka	Svatopluk Kuřátko	13 episodes
1988	Cirkus Humberto	Vosátko	9 episodes
1988	O Kubovi a Stázině	Vodník Cesílko	Animated; 13 episodes
1993–1994	Arabela Returns	Vodník	12 episodes
1996–1997	Hospoda	Chef František / Kachna	39 episodes
2001–2003	Bob a Bobek – králíci z klobouku	Narrator	Animated; 11 episodes
2003	Hospital at the End of the City, Twenty Years On	Václav Pěnkava	13 episodes
2014–2016	Doktoři z Počátků	František Beran	59 episodes
