= Jana Nagyová =

Jana Nagyová may refer to:

- Jana Nagyová (actress) (born 1959), Slovak actress
- Jana Nagyová, birth name of Jana Nečasová (born 1964), Czech politician
- Jana Nagyová (politician) (born 1970), Czech politician
