= Arabela Returns =

1993 Czechoslovak fairy tale television series

- Genre: children's television fantasy family
- Written by: Václav Vorlíček; Miloš Macourek
- Directed by: Václav Vorlíček
- Starring: Jiří Lábus; Miroslava Šafránková; Vladimír Dlouhý
- Theme music composer: Luboš Fišer
- Country of origin: Czechoslovakia
- Original language: Czech
- No. of episodes: 26

Production
- Editor: Miroslav Hájek
- Camera setup: Emil Sirotek
- Running time: 29 min

Original release
- Network: ČT
- Release: 1993 – 1994

Related
- Arabela

Arabela Returns (Czech title: Arabela se vrací aneb Rumburak králem Říše pohádek, literally Arabela Returns or Rumburak the King of the Fairy Tale Kingdom) is a fairy tale series from 1993. It is a sequel to the fairy tale series Arabela from 1980.

== Cast ==
- Alena Karešová as narrator
- Jiří Lábus as Rumburak, the mischievous sorcerer who is the primary antagonist of the series.
- Miroslava Šafránková as Arabela Majerová, Princess
- Vladimír Dlouhý as Petr Majer, Arabela's husband
- Marián Labuda as Mr. Papp, King of Toys
- Dagmar Patrasová as Xénie, Arabela's sister
- Matouš Soukenka as prince Fredy, son of Xénie
- Oldřich Vízner as Vilibald, husband of Xénie
- Jana Andresíková as Mrs. Černá, Witch that helps Rumburak
- Jana Brejchová as Queen, mother of Arabela and Xénie
- Vlastimil Brodský as King Hyacint, King of Fairy Tale Kingdom and father of Arabela and Xénie
- Jaroslava Kretschmerová as Roxana Pasačka ovcí, později pomocnice Rumburaka
- Ondřej Kepka as Honzík Majer, brother of Petr Majer, student
- Hana Igonda Ševčíková as Mařenka, friend of Honza Majer
- Petr Nárožný as Karel Majer, son of Petr and Arabela, Hyacint's twin
- Pavel Zedníček as Hyacint Majer, son of Petr and Arabela, Karel's twin
- Jiří Sovák as Theophil Vigo, Wizard Supreme
- Pavel Nový as Fantomas, ruler of the Realm of Adult Fairy Tales, Rumburak ho proměnil v kuličku
- Stella Zázvorková as Grandma Majerová, Mother of Petr and Honza
- Jana Kimlová as Natálka, daughter of Mr. Papp
- Luděk Sobota as Baltus, servant
- Iva Janžurová as Mrs. Mülerová Učitelka klavíru, manželka Blekoty
- Jiří Sedláček as Ogre Balibul
