= Arabela (TV series) =

Czechoslovak children's television series

- Also known as: Арабела; Công chúa Arabela; Die Märchenbraut; Die schöne Arabella und der Zauberer; Principessa Arabela; De sprookjesbruid
- Genre: Fantasy, family, comedy, adventure, musical
- Written by: Václav Vorlíček; Miloš Macourek
- Directed by: Václav Vorlíček
- Starring: Vladimír Menšík; Stella Zázvorková; Vladimír Dlouhý; Jana Nagyová; Jiří Lábus
- Composer: Lubos Fiser
- Countries of origin: Czechoslovakia; West Germany
- Original languages: Czech; German
- No. of seasons: 1
- No. of episodes: 13

Production
- Executive producer: Jiří Krejčí
- Producer: Gert Müntefering
- Cinematography: Emil Sirotek
- Editors: Miroslav Hájek; Marie Hejzlarová
- Running time: 30 minutes
- Production companies: Czechoslovak Television; Westdeutscher Rundfunk

Original release
- Network: ČT; ARD
- Release: 25 December 1980 – 4 October 1981

Related
- Arabela Returns

Arabela (sometimes Arabela the Princess, or A Tale of the Magic Ring) was a children's television series produced in Czechoslovakia which aired from 1979 to 1981.

The series has 13 episodes and is in Czech and German.

== Production ==
Because of Jana Nagyová's distinct accent, which was deemed too hard for children to properly understand, the actual voice of Arabela was provided by Libuše Šafránková. Nagyová and Dagmar Patrasová (Xenie) had also a joint performance in the crime drama Smrt stopařek (lit.: "Killing Hitchhikers", 1979) directed by Jindřich Polák, who is better known for his creation of the children TV's character Pan Tau.

Besides, Theodor Pištěk designed the costumes for the series.

== Plot ==
=== Synopsis ===
Arabela comes to the Human World

The series revolves around the members of a regular family, the Majers, who encounter people from the Fairytale Kingdom. Karel Majer, an actor and fairy tale reader on children's TV, one day finds a small bell which, when rung, summons an enigmatic figure calling himself Rumburak the Magician who claims that he is intent on fulfilling every wish Majer has.

In order to please his children at a fair's shooting gallery, Majer wishes to learn to shoot, which Rumburak grants; but the wolf Majer shoots unexpectedly begins to talk in the human tongue as it lies dying. As it turns out, Rumburak has taken Majer to the Realm of Fairy Tales for his shooting lessons, and the wolf was the principal antagonist from the tale of Red Riding Hood.

At last, Majer is sent back to the human world, but Rumburak is ousted for this perceived act of mischief and must henceforth play the role of the wolf himself.

Rumburak also comes to the Human World

Enraged, Rumburak takes revenge on the Fairytale Kingdom by establishing a pirate broadcast station in his castle and, by using his magic to impersonate Majer, twisting the fairy tales into grotesque stories, like having the prince from Sleeping Beauty (here named Vilibald) stealing from the sleeping people instead of reawakening them.

The King of the Fairytale Realm, Hyacint, decides to put Majer under observation and sends his court magician Vigo and his daughters Arabela and Xenie to the human world. Arabela, the kinder and gentler of the two princesses, soon meets and falls in love with Majer's son Petr, while Xenie, spoiled and selfish, takes a liking to the modern world's commodities and eventually wishes to accordingly convert the Fairytale World.

Humans come to the Fairytale World

Soon, life for the Majers and the royal family turns upside down as the presence of their most important magical items, particularly three Wishing Rings, begins to wreak confusion in both worlds and several members of each side, especially Petr, his younger brother Honzik and their girl neighbor Mařenka, are left stranded in the respective other world.

In addition, Rumburak lusts after Arabela and with the help of the Evil Witch, who manages to turn the Queen into a white dove and take her place at the king's side, does everything he can to make her his bride. But with the aid of Fantomas, a denizen of the Realm of Adult Fairytales, all is eventually put back in place : Arabela marries Petr and prepares to spend the rest of her life in the human world; Rumburak and the Witch are turned into household appliances just as they make a last-ditch attempt to sabotage the wedding; and the Queen is restored to her rightful place.

The only regret is that the magic bell, left by Hyacint with the Majers for emergencies, is soon buried in the garden by the Majers' dachshund, severing the connection between the two worlds for the time being.

=== Magic things ===
The series featured several magic items, starting with the magic rings.

- Magic rings - make any wish become reality
- Magic cape - teleports the wearer from one place to another (usual from fairy tale world to our world)
- Magic wand - less powerful than the magic rings, it can be used only by a wizard
- Crystal globe - it shows a person
- Magic boots - makes its wearer run fast. Based on the Seven-league boots of many European fairy tales.
- Night cap - makes its wearer invisible and allows him to pass through walls
- Suitcase - flight. Based on the tale "The Flying Suitcase" ("Der Fliegende Koffer") by Hans Christian Andersen.
- Broom stick - flight
- Gold bell - calls somebody from the fairy tale world
- Money pouch - endless supply of gold coins
- White Snake - When its flesh is eaten, its consumers (here, Arabela and Rumburak) are able to understand the language of animals. Based on the fairy tale "The White Snake" ("Die Weiße Schlange") by the Brothers Grimm.

== Crew ==
- Art direction: Milan Nejedlý
- Set decoration: Jiří Rulík
- Costume design: Theodor Pištěk, Ludmila Ondrácková
- Makeup department: Ivana Frýdová Bisingrová, Jiří Hurych
- Sound department: František Fabián
- Music department: František Belfín & Filmový symfonický orchestr
- Gaffer: Andy Arnautov

Actors	Protagonists	Describes
Jana Nagyová	Arabela The Beautiful	The First Princess of The Fairytale Realm
Vladimír Dlouhý	Petr Majer	A Student From The Human World
Jiří Lábus	Rumburak	The Mischievous Sorcerer Who Is The Primary Antagonist of The Series
Ondřej Kepka	Honzík Majer	Petr's Younger Brother
Veronika Týblová	Mařenka Hermanová	A Girl Living Next to The Majers, and Honzík's Agemate and Friend
Vladimír Menšík	Mr. Karel Majer	Petr's Father, A Television Actor
Stella Zázvorková	Mrs. Majerová	Petr's Mother, Karel's Wife
Dagmar Patrasová	Xenie The Arrogant	The Second Princess of The Fairytale Realm
Jana Andresíková	The Evil Witch	The witch From Jeníček and Mařenka. Rumburak's Ally In His Plans to Claim The Fairytale Realm and Arabela
Vlastimil Brodský	Hyacint His Majesty	The King of The Fairytale Realm
Jana Brejchová	Queen	The Two Wives of King Hyacint
Jiří Sovák	Sir Vigo	The Court Sorcerer of The Fairytale Realm
Iva Janžurová	Miss Milerová	Honzík's Piano Teacher Who Ends Up Marrying Rumburak's Henchman Blekota
František Filipovský	Blekota The Devil	Rumburak's Henchman, Later The Husband of Miss Milerová and The Only Henchman Who Is Shown to Reform In The Course of The Series
Stanislav Hájek	Pekota	Rumburak's Henchman, A Headless Knight
Jiří Krytinář	Mekota	Rumburak's Henchman, A Dwarf
František Peterka	Sir Fantomas	The Headman of The Adult Fairytale Realm
Oldřich Vízner	Vilibald The Fond	The Prince From Sleeping Beauty, Who Ends Up As Xenie's Husband
Actors	Minor characters	Describes
Jiří Lír		1st King's Advisor
Oldřich Velen		2nd King's Advisor
Luděk Kopřiva		The Headmaster
Petr Svojtka	Mr. Jiří	A Psychiatrist
Luba Skořepová		A Witch
Jan Kraus		Petr's Classmate
Jiří Pleskot		A School Inspector
Josef Dvořák		The Vodník
Jiří Kodet	Mr. Novák	The Director
Jiří Hrzán	Mr. Gros	The Television Assistant
Václav Lohniský	Fousek	A Thief
Antonín Jedlička	Mr. Adam	Honzík's Teacher
Ivana Andrlová		Petr's Classmate
Helena Růžičková		The Storyteller
Věra Kalendová		A Woman In Kitchen
Jana Drbohlavová	Mrs. Hermanová	Mařenka's Mother
Alena Procházková		An Arts Expert
Ludmila Roubíková		A Woman In Kitchen
Dana Vávrová	Red Riding Hood	
Hana Talpová	Mařenka	As An Adult
Lenka Kořínková		1st Maid
Simona Stašová		2nd Maid
Lenka Termerová		3rd Maid
Ladislav Županič	Mr. Herman	
Jitka Zelenohorská		A Psychiatric Doctor
Milan Riehs		1st General
Milan Neděla		2nd General
Radim Vašinka		3rd General
Čestmír Řanda		The Professor of Technology
Josef Šebek		A Waiter
Otto Šimánek	Long	A Fool Giant
Václav Sloup		A Factory Technician
Josef Větrovec		A Chief Psychiatrist

== Influences ==
For the original Czech language version of the series, actress Libuše Šafránková, also known soon in West Germany (Three Wishes for Cinderella, 1973), dubbed the role of Arabela. The clear Slovakian accent of Jana Nagyová, who can be seen in the role, was found disturbing by the makers of the series.

In 2014, Polish zoologist Wanda Wesołowska first described a genus of jumping spider from Southern Africa, named Rumburak.

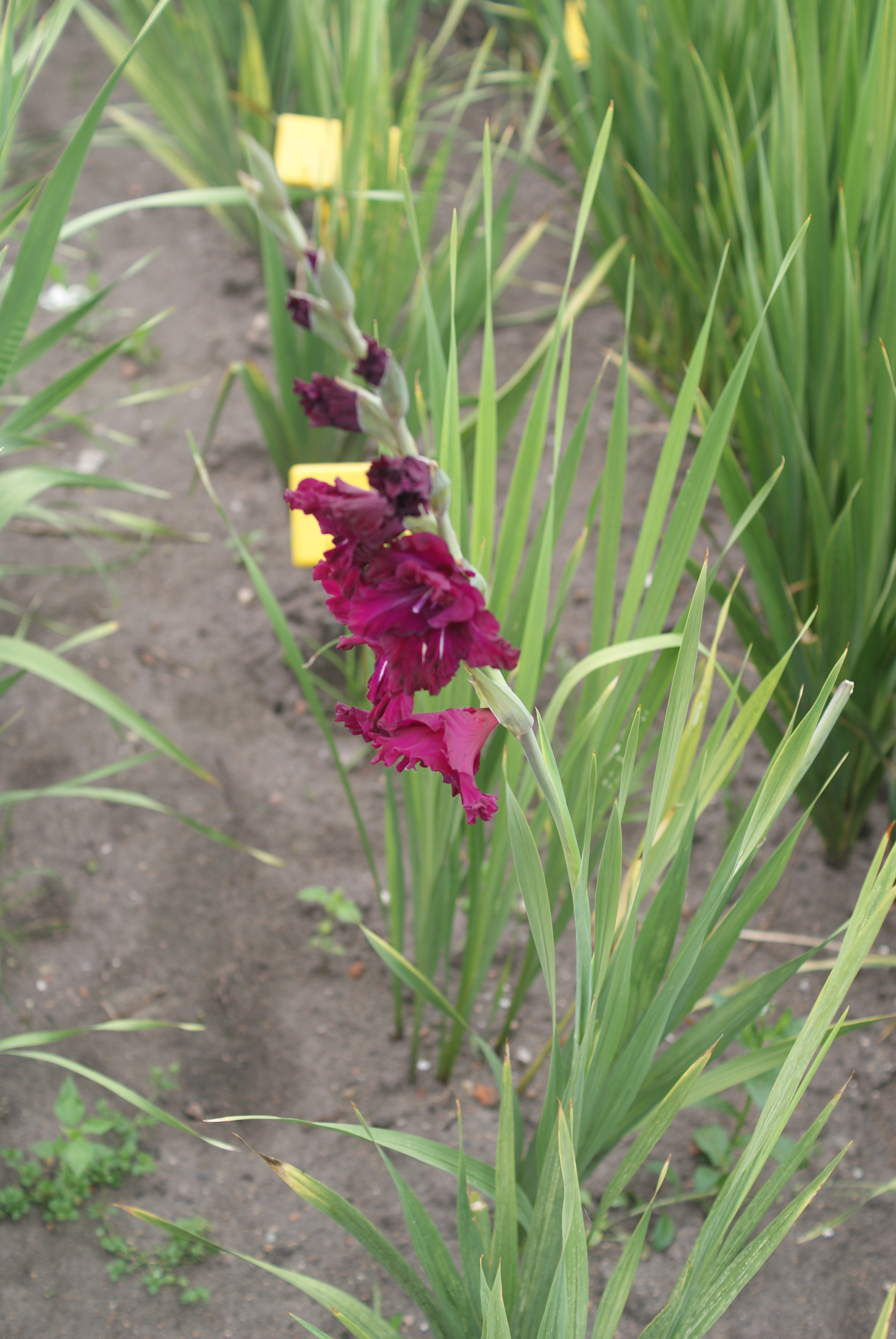
Gladiolus Rumburak was bred in 1986.

=== Reception ===
The series was first broadcast on Czechoslovak Television. The first German broadcast began on the ARD program (Westdeutscher Rundfunk) on 4 October 1981. In the German Democratic Republic, the series – in the GDR version – was first broadcast from 30 July to 12 November 1983 in the first program and was repeated in the second program in 1987.

This show aired in 57 other countries as well, like Yugoslavia (modern Slovenia and North Macedonia), Bulgaria, Romania and even Vietnam in the 1980s and also in Croatia in 1990s. It was also very popular in West Germany, where it was renamed Die Märchenbraut (lit: "The Fairytale Bride"), while in East Germany it was broadcast under its original title.

It was first released on DVD in 2009 by Universum Film. Since 2021, the German Blu-ray version has been widely released on websites.

=== Adaptations and sequels ===
The character of Rumburak has received his own TV movie, called Rumburak (1984), in which Jiří Lábus reprises his role from Arabela. However, in this instance Rumburak is portrayed as a reformed protagonist and sympathetic character, and its story has no direct connection with Arabela. The film was written by Miloš Macourek, and directed by Václav Vorlíček.

There is also a sequel series, Arabela Returns, or Rumburak the King of the Fairytale Kingdom (Arabela se vrací aneb Rumburak králem Říše pohádek) in 1993, with several new stories and figures, but it did not gain the popularity of the original series.

Besides, in 2013, Václav Vorlíček received an offer to film a remake of the series with German actors for German television, but the director refused.

== See also ==
- Dinner for Adele
- The Girl on the Broomstick
- Létající Čestmír
- The Prince and the Evening Star

== Bibliography ==
- Macourek, Miloš. Die Märchenbraut/Der Zauberrabe. ISBN 3-8025-5034-X, ISBN 978-3-8025-5034-8.
- Adamovič, Ivan. Encyklopedie fantastického filmu. Prague: Cinema, 1994. ISBN 80-901675-3-5. Chapter Fantastický žánr na televizní obrazovce. p. 200. (in Czech)
- Vân-Anh, Nguyễn-Thị. Princess Arabela, or The Magic Ring: Filmtale (Vietnamese language). Đà-Nẵng Publisher, Vietnam, March 1986.
