= Dagmar Patrasová =

Czech actress and singer (born 1956)

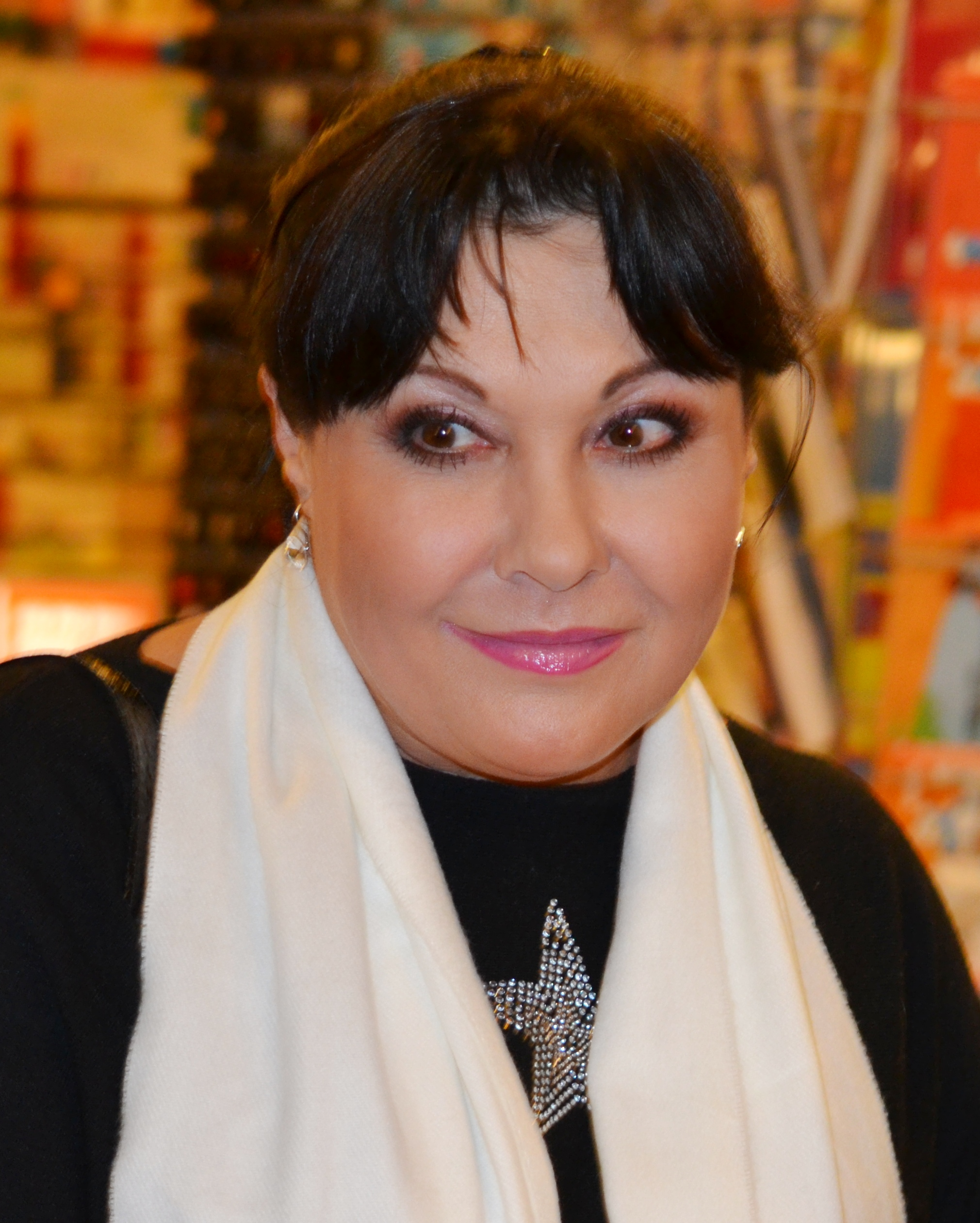
- Patrasová in 2013
- Born: 27 April 1956 (age 70); Prague, Czechoslovakia
- Occupations: Actress, singer
- Years active: 1975–present
- Spouse: Felix Slováček (m. 1983)
- Children: 2, including Anna
- Website: patrasova.cz

Dagmar Patrasová (born 27 April 1956) is a Czech actress and singer. She is known especially for her performances in children's TV shows and roles in fairy tale films and comedies.

== Personal life ==
Patrasová is married to musician Felix Slováček, with whom she has two children.

== Selected filmography ==
- The Little Mermaid (1976)
- The Hit (1981)
- Waiter, Scarper! (1981)
- Choking Hazard (2004)

=== Television ===
- Pan Tau (2 episodes, 1977)
- Arabela (10 episodes, 1979)
- Návštěvníci (15 episodes, 1983)
- Arabela se vrací (22 episodes, 1993)
