= Zelená vlna =

Boat Builders
- Directed by: Václav Vorlíček
- Written by: Vladimír Kalina
- Cinematography: Josef Vanis
- Edited by: Miroslav Hájek
- Music by: Karel Svoboda
- Release date: 1 June 1982
- Running time: 87 minutes
- Country: Czechoslovakia

Zelená vlna is a 1982 Czechoslovak comedy film directed by Václav Vorlíček.

== Cast ==
- Radovan Lukavský - Dr. Pelc
- Rudolf Jelínek - Taxi driver
- Josef Chvalina - Professor Doucha
