= Anna Slováčková =

Czech singer and actor (1995–2025)

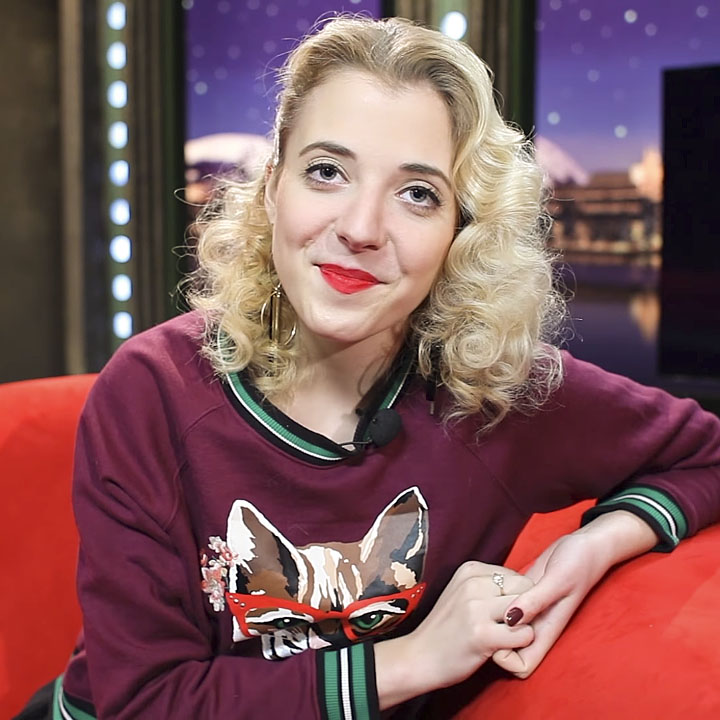
- Slováčková in 2017
- Born: 22 August 1995; Prague, Czech Republic
- Died: 6 April 2025 (aged 29); Prague, Czech Republic
- Occupations: Actress, singer
- Parent(s): Felix Slováček (father); Dagmar Patrasová (mother)

Anna Julie Slováčková (22 August 1995 – 6 April 2025) was a Czech singer and actress.

== Life and career ==
Anna Julie Slováčková was born in Prague on 22 August 1995, to an artistic family. Her father is the musician Felix Slováček and her mother is the actress Dagmar Patrasová. Her brother Felix Jr. and her half-sister René are both actors.

Slováčková played piano and sang from the age of four. As a child, she appeared in her mother's plays as well as various television shows for children. She studied singing at a conservatory in Prague.

In 2016, she competed in the reality show Tvoje tvář má známý hlas and starred in the soap opera Ordinace v růžové zahradě 2. In addition, she performed as a musician with her father's band as well as with her own pop-rock band. In 2021, she released her debut album Aura. In 2023 she released her second album Osudová.

In 2019, Slováčková was diagnosed with breast cancer. Her initial treatment was successful but in 2023, metastases were discovered in her lungs. During her fight with cancer, Slováčková became a popular face of cancer awareness campaigns in the Czech Republic.

Slováčková died of cancer at her home in Prague, on 6 April 2025, at the age of 29.
