= Felix Slováček =

Czech clarinetist and saxophonist (born 1943)

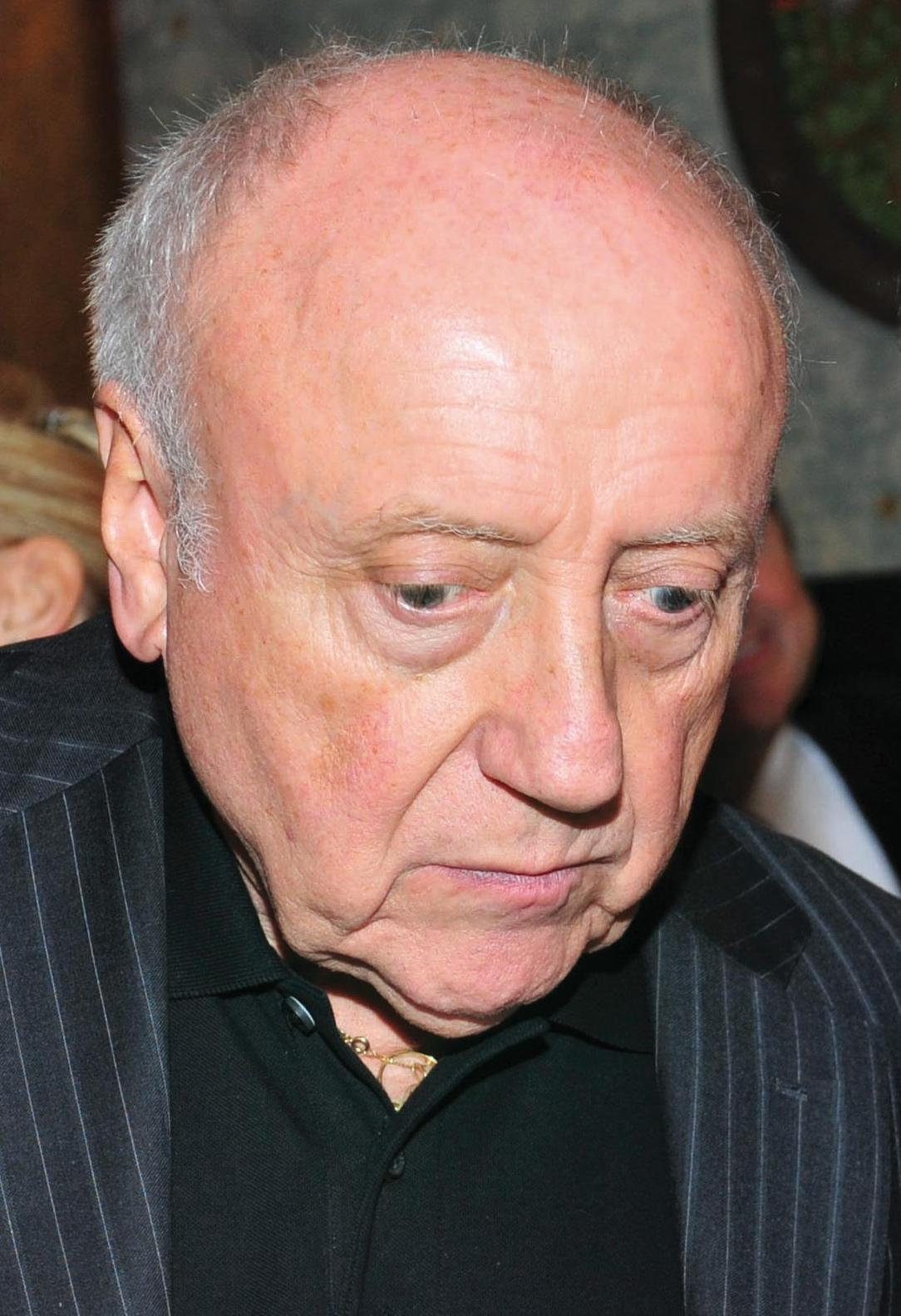
- Born: 23 May 1943 (age 82); Zlín, Bohemia and Moravia (now Czech Republic)
- Occupations: Clarinetist, saxophonist
- Years active: 1978–present
- Spouse: Dagmar Patrasová (m. 1983)
- Children: 3, including Anna
- Awards: Medal of Merit (2013)

Felix Slováček (born 23 May 1943) is a Czech clarinetist, conductor, film composer, and saxophonist. He is married to the actress Dagmar Patrasová.

== Life ==
In his youth he studied Piano and Violin, but disliked doing so. His interest in clarinet, and later, saxophone began after finishing high school. He has worked in classical music, children's music, jazz, and he conducts the "Felix Slováček Big Band." Throughout his career, he has sold over two million albums.

== Discography ==
- 1998 Felix Slováček Con Amore (Český rozhlas)
- 1998 Felix Slováček Big Band – Happy-Go-Lucky (Český rozhlas)
- 1997 20 x Felix Slováček (Bonton music)
- 1996 Rozvíjej se, poupátko
- 1996 Felix Slováček a jeho Beatles (Monitor-EMI)
- 1996 Felix Slováček – Saxo (Bonton music)
- 1994 Dvorana slávy
- 1994 Felix Slováček – Classic Essential (Supraphon)
- 1993 For Lovers (Supraphon)
- 1982 The Velvet Sound of Felix Slováček (Supraphon)
