= Otto Šimánek =

Czech actor

- Born: 28 April 1925; Třešť, Czechoslovakia
- Died: 8 May 1992 (aged 67); Prague, Czechoslovakia
- Occupation: Actor

Otto Šimánek (28 April 1925 – 8 May 1992) was a Czech actor and mime. He worked at the Prague City Theatre and also taught mime at the Prague Conservatory. He became internationally known through the role of the silent wizard Pan Tau.

== Selected filmography ==
- Invention for Destruction (1958)
- Desire (1958)
- The Fabulous Baron Munchausen (1962)
- Objev na Střapaté hůrce (1962)
- A Prayer for Katerina Horovitzova (1965)
- Who Wants to Kill Jessie? (1966)
- The Phantom of Morrisville (1966)
- The End of Agent W4C (1967)
- Světáci (1969)
- Pan Tau (TV series; 1970–1979)
- Tomorrow I'll Wake Up and Scald Myself with Tea (1977)
- Arabela (TV series; 1979–1981)
