= Young Wine =

1986 Czechoslovak comedy film

Mladé víno (Young Wine) is a 1986 Czechoslovak comedy film directed by Václav Vorlíček. The film is the third part of a trilogy, which includes Wine Working (1976) and Rough Wine (1981). It has received various awards in Czechoslovakia (best actress, best director).
