= Rudolf Jelínek =

Czechoslovak actor (1935–2024)

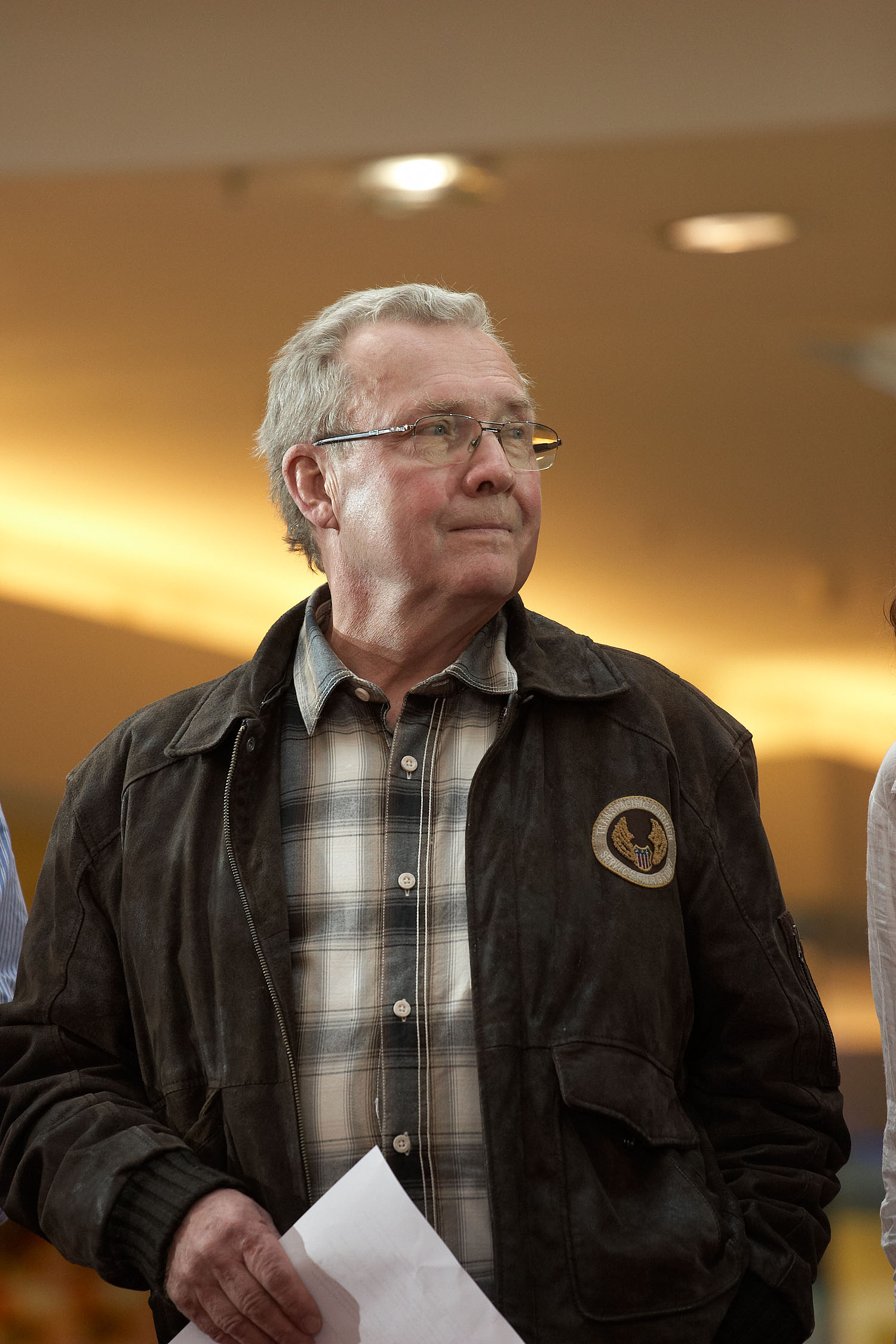
- Jelínek in 2009
- Born: 27 February 1935; Kutná Hora, Czechoslovakia
- Died: 10 August 2024 (aged 89)
- Occupation: Actor
- Years active: 1955–2016

Rudolf Jelínek (27 February 1935 – 10 August 2024) was a Czech film actor.

== Biography ==
He appeared in more than 122 films and television shows between 1955 and 2016 and participated in the dubbing of more than 60 films and television series. He played one of his most famous roles in the television series Thirty Cases of Major Zeman. He was awarded honorary citizenship of Kutná Hora (2015). Jelínek died on 10 August 2024, at the age of 89.

== Selected filmography ==
- Páté kolo u vozu (1957) as Arnost - Jana's friend
- Smugglers of Death (1959) as Sgt. Cigánek
- The Fabulous Baron Munchausen (1962) as Tony
- Atentát (1964) as Serg. Strnad
- Maratón (1968) as German operator
- The Bridge at Remagen (1969) as Pvt. Manfred
- Sokolovo (1974) as Sochor
- The Prince and the Evening Star (1979) as knight Cestmír
- Front in the Rear of the Enemy (1981) as Zayfert
- Ta chvíle, ten okamžik (1981) as Frantisek
- Zelená vlna (1982) as Taxi driver
- The Zookeeper (2001) as Zoo Official
- I Served the King of England (2006)
