= Václav Vorlíček =

Czech film director (1930–2019)

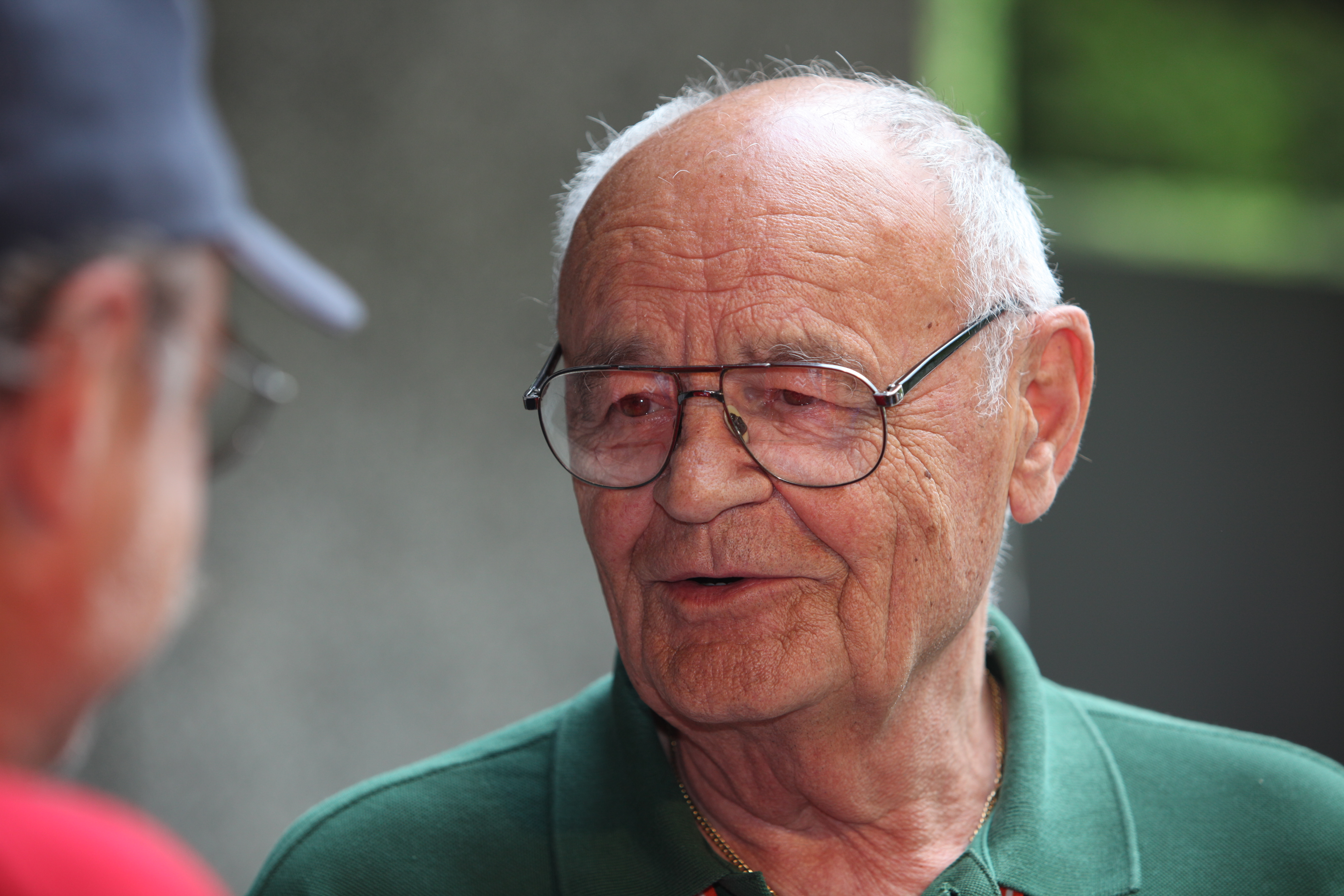
- Václav Vorlíček in 2010
- Born: 3 June 1930; Prague, Czechoslovakia
- Died: 5 February 2019 (aged 88); Prague, Czech Republic
- Resting place: Vyšehrad Cemetery, Prague
- Education: Academy of Performing Arts in Prague
- Occupation: Film director
- Years active: 1953–2011

Václav Vorlíček (3 June 1930 – 5 February 2019) was a Czech film director. His filmography includes several comedies made in collaboration with screenwriter Miloš Macourek. He also specialized in directing children's and fairytale films, most notably Three Wishes for Cinderella (1973), a Christmas film classic in many European countries.

== Biography ==
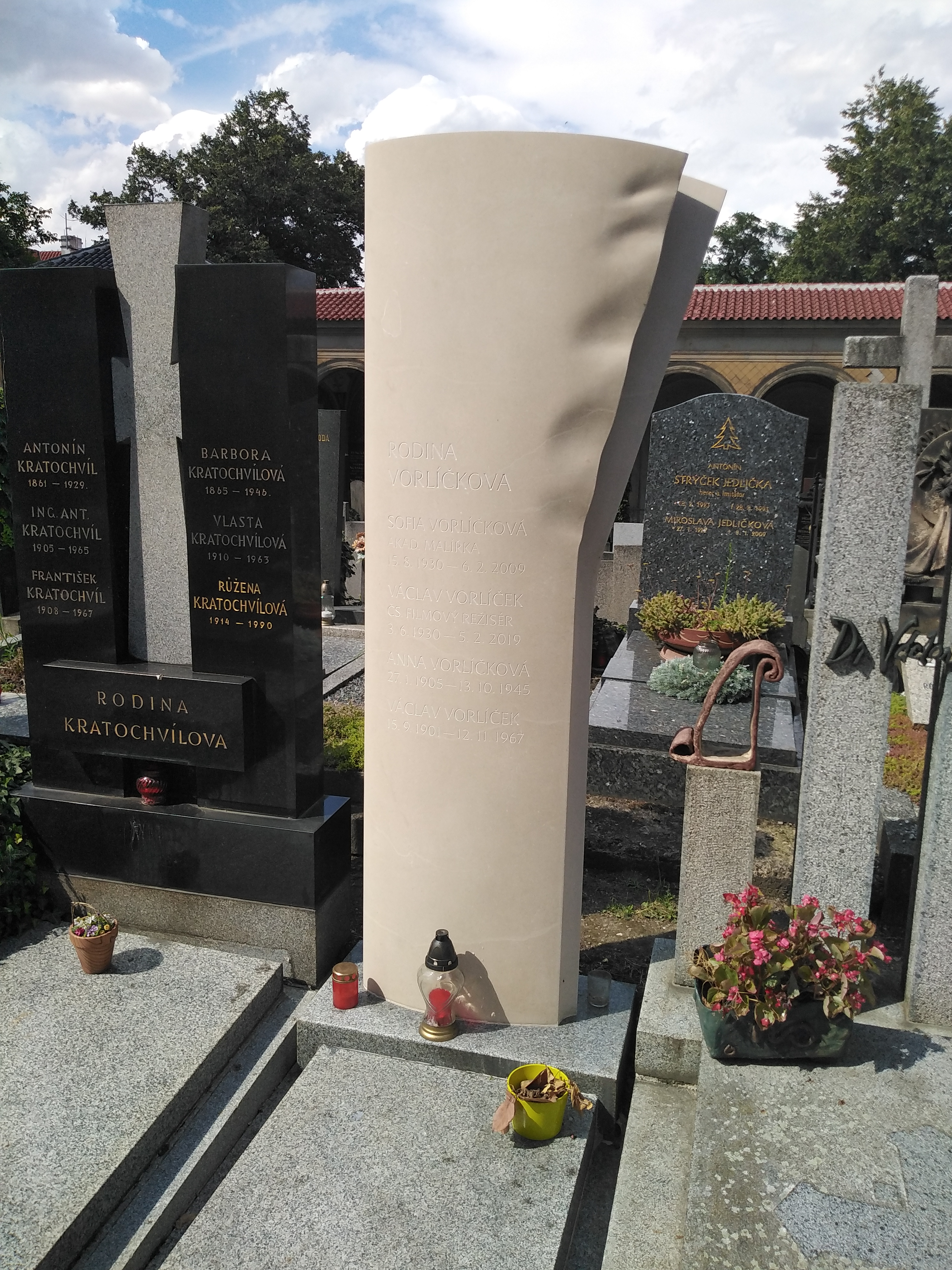
Vorlíček' grave at the Vyšehrad Cemetery

Václav Vorlíček was born in the Vinohrady district of Prague on 3 June 1930. His parents were culturally inclined and were members of the Umělecká beseda forum. He had been a member of the Scouts since 1939, and in 1947, he and his friends appeared in the film Na dobré stopě set in a scout camp. Thanks to this, he got to know filmmaking. Due to the death of his mother, he had to extend his studies at the high school by a year and graduated in 1950. In 1952, Vorlíček married the artist Sofia Vukolova, the daughter of Russian immigrants.

Vorlíček studied filmmaking at Film and TV School of the Academy of Performing Arts in Prague (FAMU) in 1952–1957, where he later worked as a teacher himself. At the Barrandov Film Studios he worked first as an assistant director and then as a director of films for children and youth. In 1964, he met the screenwriter Miloš Macourek and they began to collaborate regularly. Their first film Who Wants to Kill Jessie? (1966) won the main award at the Trieste Film Festival. Together they made several other film for children and comedies that belong to the golden fund of Czech cinematography. Their duo was among the busiest filmmakers in the country in the 1970s and 1980s.

In 1973, Vorlíček made a cult fairy tale film Three Wishes for Cinderella, which became a Christmas film classic in many European countries, including Czech Republic, Germany and Norway.

Vorlíček died from lung cancer on 5 February 2019, at the age of 88. He died in a Prague hospital. He is buried at the Vyšehrad Cemetery.

== Selected filmography ==
- Who Wants to Kill Jessie? (1966)
- The End of Agent W4C (1967)
- You Are a Widow, Sir (1970)
- The Girl on the Broomstick (1972)
- Three Wishes for Cinderella (1973)
- How to Drown Dr. Mracek, the Lawyer (1974)
- Což takhle dát si špenát (1977)
- How to Wake a Princess (1977)
- The Prince and the Evening Star (1979)
- Arabela (TV series, 1980–1981)
- Zelená vlna (1982)
- Létající Čestmír (TV series, 1984)
- Young Wine (1986)
- Křeček v noční košili (TV series, 1987)
- Arabela Returns (TV series, 1993–1994)

== Honours ==
In 2005, Zdeněk Zelenka filmed a documentary film about Vorlíček called Václav Vorlíček, král komedií a pohádek ("Václav Vorlíček, the king of comedies and fairy tales").
