= Maxipes Fík =

Czechoslovak children's TV series

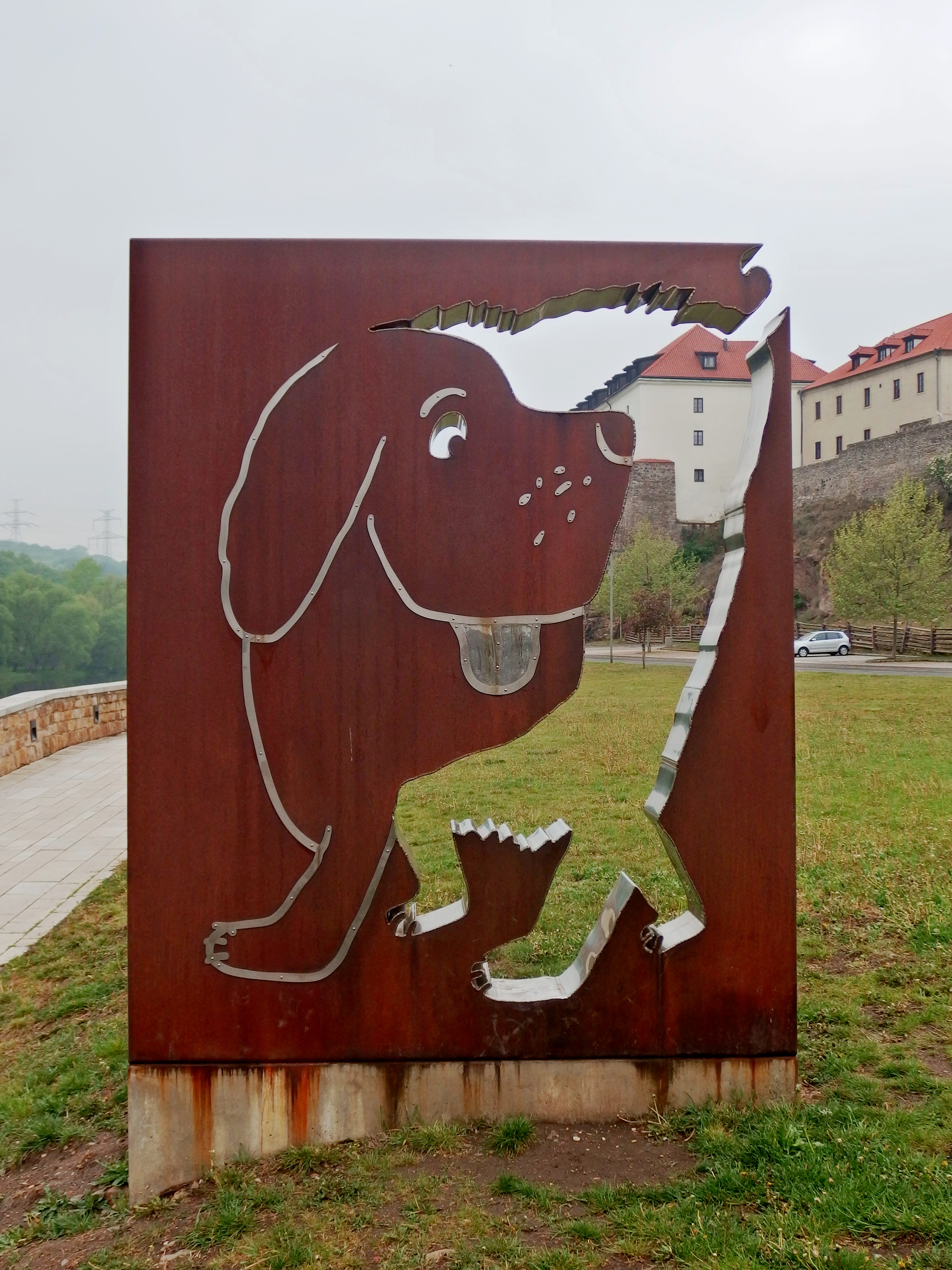
Maxipes Fík

Maxipes Fík (literally "Fig the Maxidog") is a Czechoslovak children's TV animated series. The main character is a large dog. It was one of the most popular series made for the children's television programme Večerníček.

The first series was shot in 1975. The author and screenwriter was Rudolf Čechura and the animator was Jiří Šalamoun. Music was composed by Petr Skoumal, the voice was narrated by actor Josef Dvořák. The second series was launched in 1982. In memory of Maxipes Fík his birthday is celebrated in Kadaň; Maxipes Fík was born in Ahníkov, a bulldozed village nearby. Both Rudolf Čechura and Josef Dvořák also lived in the area.

== Maxipes Fík ==
1. Zrození Maxipsa Fíka
2. Zmoudření maxipsa Fíka
3. Maxipes Fík sportuje
4. Fík ve škole
5. Fík za volantem
6. Fík – mistr skoku
7. Fík jde do světa
8. Maxipes Fík trosečníkem
9. Maxipes Fík v teplých krajích
10. Maxipes Fík polárníkem
11. Maxipes Fík u protinožců
12. Maxipes Fík objevitelem
13. Maxipes Fík se vrací

== Divoké sny Maxipsa Fíka ==
1. O požárnících
2. O kopané
3. O prázdninách
4. O velkém městě
5. O žních
6. O lupičích
7. O lovu
8. O vynalézání
9. O velké zimě
10. O Vánocích
11. O hledání pokladu
12. O Minifíkovi
13. O nevěstě

== See also ==
- Clifford the Big Red Dog
