= Ota Hofman =

- Born: 10 April 1928; Prague, Czechoslovakia
- Died: 17 May 1989 (aged 61); Prague, Czechoslovakia
- Occupations: Writer, screenwriter
- Writing career
- Genres: Children's literature, young adult literature
- Notable work: Pan Tau

Ota Hofman (also known under pseudonym Ota Dvorský; 10 April 1928 – 17 May 1989) was a Czech writer and screenwriter. He focused on children's literature and young adult literature.

One of his most famous characters is Pan Tau, co-authored with film director Jindřich Polák.

== Awards ==
- Golden Gong Award of the German Gong radio/TV listings magazine (together with Jindřich Polák) for The Visitors (Czechoslovak TV series).
- 1979: Meritorious Artist honorary title
- 1989: National Artist honorary title
