= Michael Hofbauer =

Czech film actor

Michael Hofbauer (6 January 1964, Prague – 10 January 2013) was a Czech film actor who gained popularity mainly in children's roles. He became popular as Otík in the TV series and films featuring the character of Pan Tau and as Osvald in the film Lucie, postrach ulice. From 1989, he worked in a theatre as a lighting technician while also playing a few minor roles. He suffered from cancer of the neck. In 2006, he underwent surgery, and then he underwent radiation therapy. He died of cancer in 2013.

== Filmography ==
- Škola princů (2010)
- Normal (2009)
- Svědomí Denisy Klánové (2009)
- Hezké chvilky bez záruky (2006)
- Ulice (TV series) (2005)
- Zlá minuta (2005)
- I ve smrti sami (2004)
- Dědictví slečny Innocencie (2003)
- Město bez dechu (2003)
- Nezvěstný (2003)
- O svatební krajce (2003)
- Smrt pedofila (2003)
- Strážce duší (2003)
- Želary (2003)
- Duch český (2001)
- To jsem z toho jelen (2000)
- Veselé krvavé kuře
- Tankový prapor (1991)
- Největší z Pierotů (1990)
- Dobrodružství kriminalistiky (1989)
- Druhý dech (1988)
- Dům pro dva (1987)
- ...a zase ta Lucie! (1984)
- Hele, on letí! (1984)
- Lucie, postrach ulice (1984)
- My všichni školou povinní (1984)
- Stav ztroskotání (1983)
- Neříkej mi majore! (1981)
- Pozor, vizita! (1981)
- Lucie, postrach ulice (1980)
- Brontosaurus (1979)
- Hordubal (1979)
- Čekání na déšť (1978)
- Od zítřka nečaruji (1978)
- Jak se točí Rozmarýny (1977)
- Jen ho nechte, ať se bojí (1977)
- Tajemství proutěného košíku (TV series) (1977)
- Páni kluci (1975)
- Profesoři za školou (1975)
