= The Prince and the Evening Star =

1979 Czechoslovak fantasy film

- Poster in Czech
- Directed by: Václav Vorlíček
- Written by: Jiří Brdečka; Božena Němcová (story)
- Produced by: Jiří Krejčí; Přemysl Pražský
- Starring: Juraj Ďurdiak; Libuše Šafránková; Radoslav Brzobohatý
- Cinematography: Josef Illík
- Edited by: Miroslav Hájek; Pavel Kopta
- Music by: Svatopluk Havelka
- Distributed by: Czechoslovak Television; National Film Archive; Ústřední Půjčovna Filmů
- Release date: 1 October 1979
- Running time: 86 minutes (with overture, intermission, entr'acte, and exit music)
- Country: Czechoslovakia
- Language: Czech

The Prince and the Evening Star (Czech and Slovak: Princ a Večernice) is a 1979 Czechoslovak coming-of-age fantasy film produced by the Barrandov Studios.

== Background ==
Film based on short story O Slunečníku, Měsíčníku a Větrníku (Note: NĚMCOVÁ, Božena. O Slunečníku, Měsíčníku a Větrníku. Ilustrace Jan Černý. Prague: Albatros, 1979. 32 s.) (Note: LAISKE, Miroslav. Bibliografie Boženy Němcové. Prague: SPN, 1962. p. 183.) (Of Sunlight, Moonlight and Windmill) in the work collection of author Božena Němcová in the XIX century. (Note: ŘEHÁK, Stanislav. Naše vzory. Díl 2. vyd. Prague: F. Bartel, 1888. 114 s.) (Note: KAREL, Horálek. K pohádkám Boženy Němcové. Zlatý máj : Kritická revue umělecké tvorby pro mládež. Březen 1989, roč. 33, čís. 3, p. 168. ISSN 0044-4871.)

== Plot ==
Old King has a son Velen and three daughters as Helenka, Elenka, Lenka. They were all very young and had nothing to do but play and sleep every day.

However, one day the King leaves Velen to temporarily run the country. That is one night, while Velen wishes upon the Evening Star, hoping to find grooms for his three sisters, and Evening Star delivers her three brothers, Sunbeam, Moonbeam and Windbeam. Meanwhile, Velen falls in love with the Evening Star. The King is dissatisfied with Velen's actions and wants Velen to bring his sisters back. They quarrel each other, and Velen leaves the castle on a quest to retrieve his sisters, as well as find the object of his affection, Evening Star. He set off in a hurry without much thought and without knowing where to start.

Velen has to face many dangers on his journey without end, including being endangered by the evil wizard Mrakomor ("cloudbreaker", a personification of storm) who wants to marry Evening Star. Velen had to stand alone to fight against the traps of this hidden enemy, but with the help from his brothers in law. After all, he then returns home with bride Evening Star and his sisters, accompanied by their husbands.

Finally, Velen is allowed to marry Evening Star.

== Production ==
Exterior shots were staged in summer 1978 at castles Ploskovice, Hrádek u Nechanic, Krakovec and especially the Adršpach-Teplice Rocks.

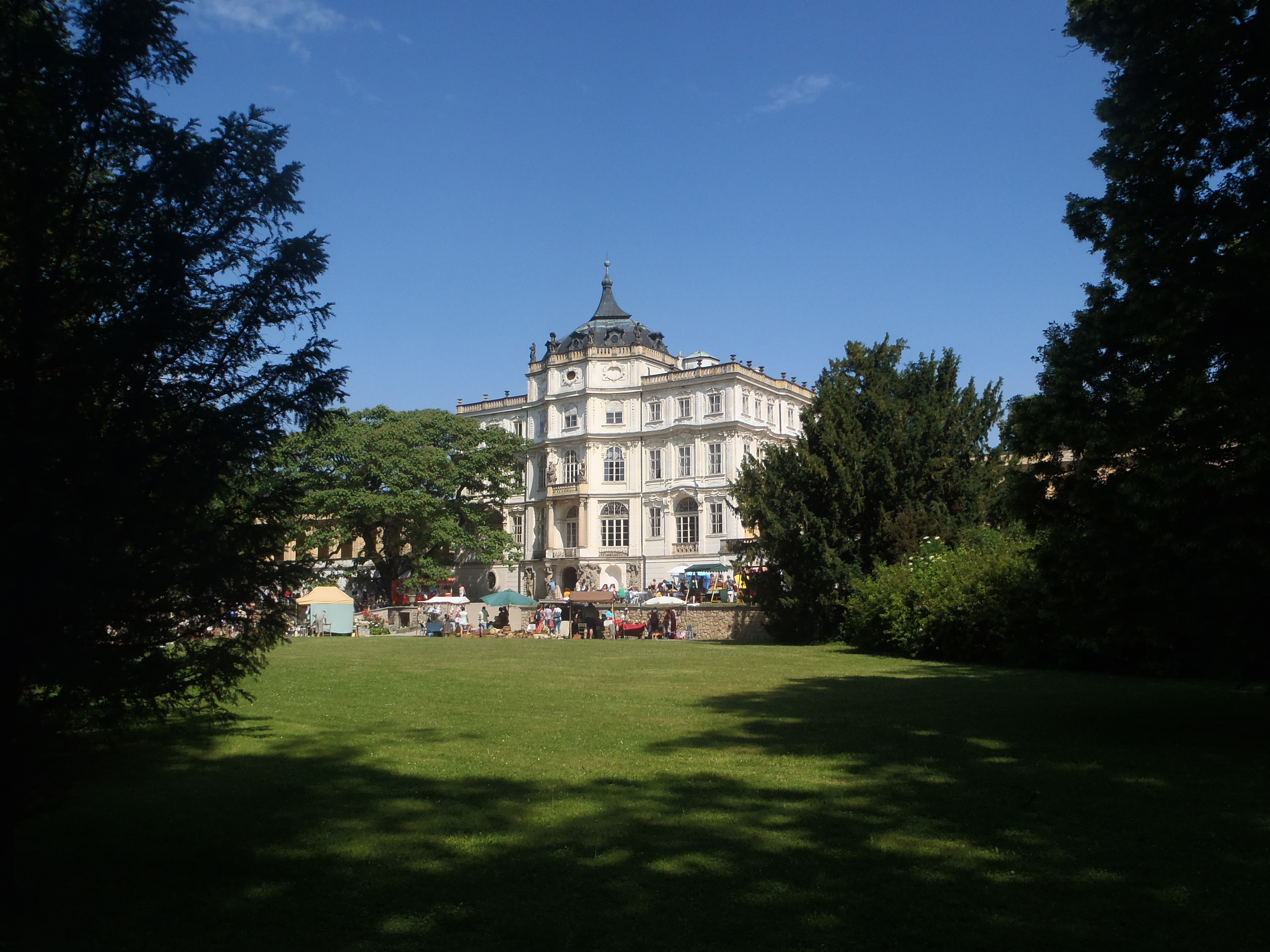
Ploskovice as the "royal castle"

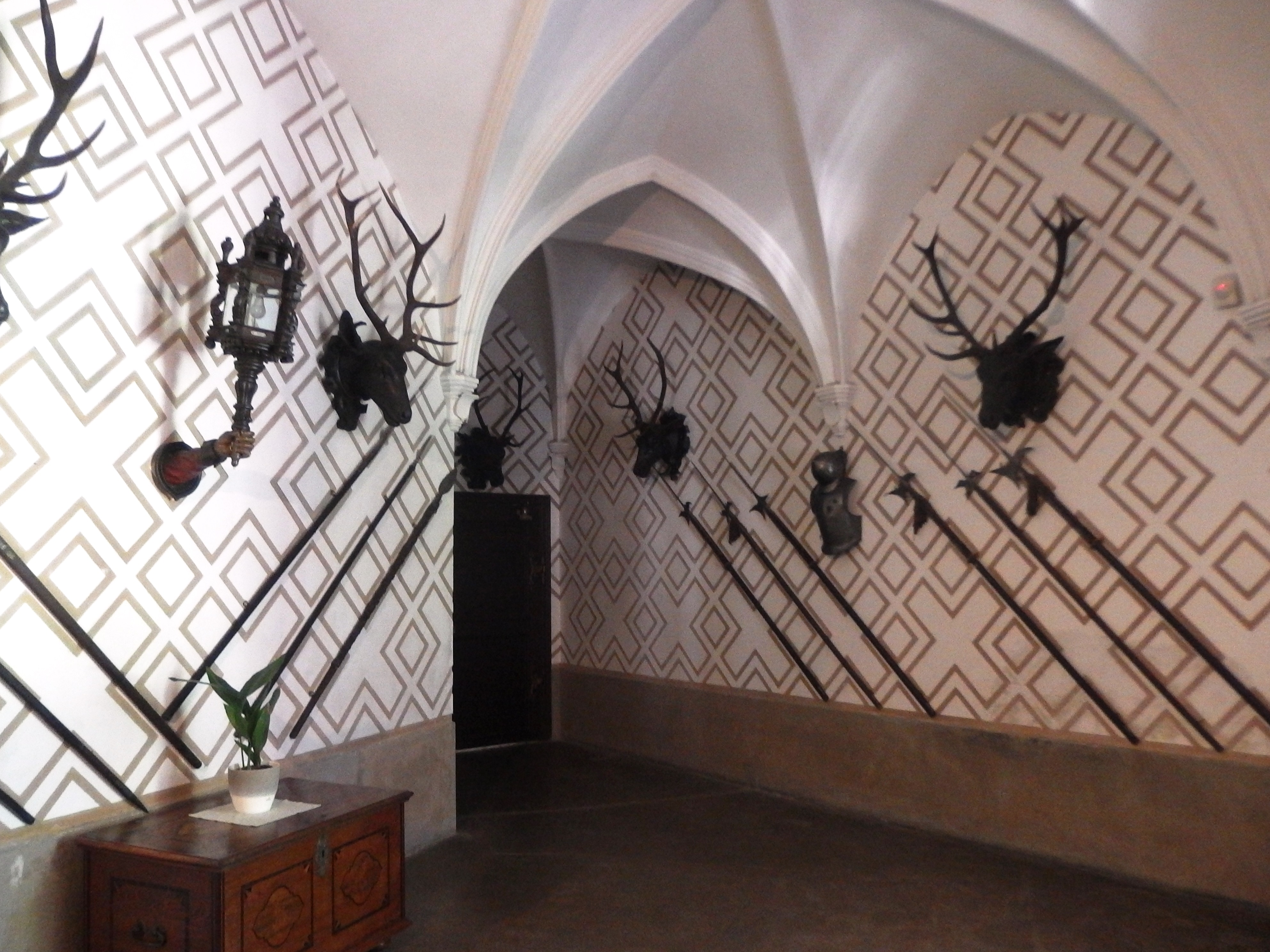
Hrádek u Nechanic as the "royal hallway"

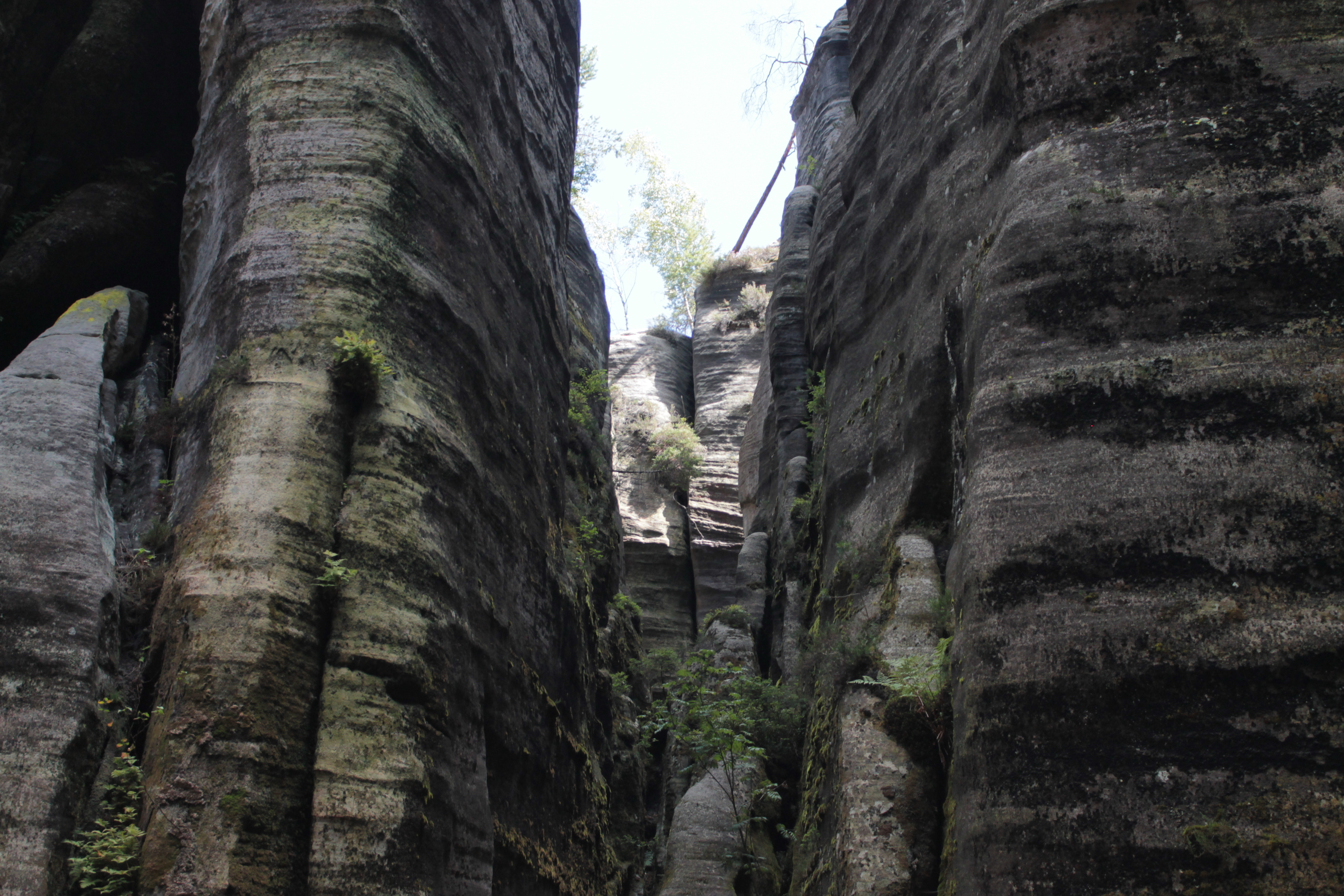
Adršpach-Teplice Rocks as the "Death way"

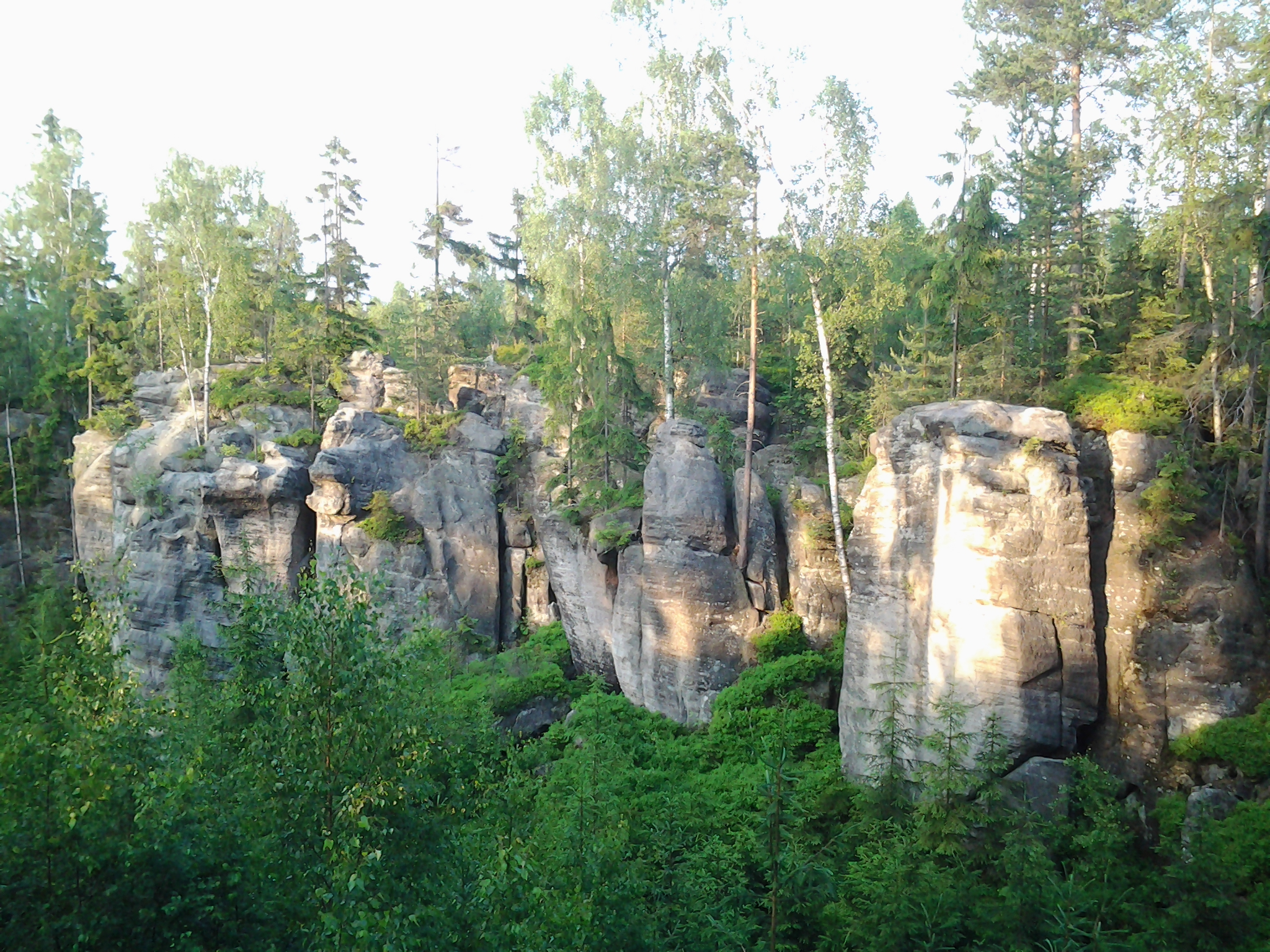
Adršpach-Teplice Rocks as the "Death woods"

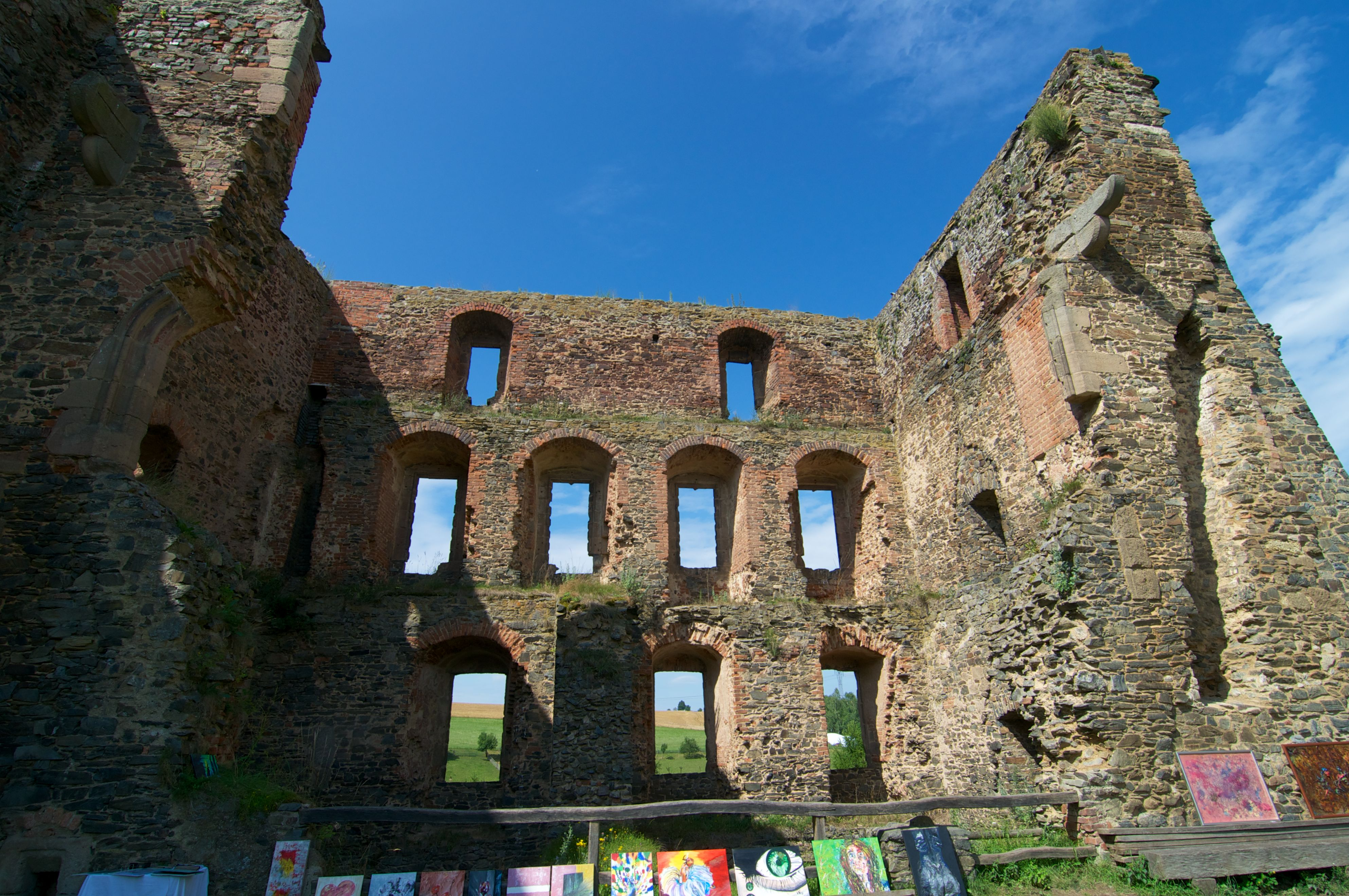
Krakovec as the "Death castle"

=== Cast ===
Main

- Juraj Ďurdiak as Prince Velen
- Libuše Šafránková as Princess Večernice the Evening Star
- Julie Jurištová as Princess Helenka
- Zlata Adamovská as Princess Elenka
- Ivana Andrlová as Princess Lenka
- Oldřich Táborský as Větrník the Windbeam, Helenka's spouse
- Alexej Okuněv as Měsíčník the Moonbeam, Elenka's spouse
- Petr Svoboda as Slunečník the Sunbeam, Lenka's spouse
- Radoslav Brzobohatý as Mrakomor the Wizard

Support

- František Filipovský as Kacafírek the Clown
- Vladimír Menšík as the Old King
- Čestmír Randa as the innkeeper
- Rudolf Jelínek as Čestmír the Knight
- Viktor Maurer as the porker
- Karel Augusta as the blind man
- Ladislav Brothánek as the strapper
- Václav Lohniský as the retired captain
- Vladimír Krska as the hunchback
- Ladislav Trojan as the groom
- Jiří Lír as the armless man
- Miloš Vavruška as the servant

Voiceover

- Petr Svojtka as Prince Velen
- Miroslav Moravec as the Windbeam
- Miroslav Masopust as the Moonbeam
- Mirko Musil as the strapper

=== Crew ===
- Music by Svatopluk Havelka
- Cinematography by Josef Illík
- Editing by Miroslav Hájek
- Production design by Karel Lier
- Set decoration by Eva Slívová
- Costume design by Theodor Pištěk
- Makeup department by Jiřina Bisingerová (makeup artist), Jiří Hurych (key makeup artist)
- Production management by Jiří Krejčí (production manager), Přemysl Pražský (production manager), Věra Winkelhöferová (unit manager)

== Influence ==
The film was quickly received by audiences from many countries during the heyday of fantasy and horror films. It was shown in Italian cinemas in 1982 and was soon released in West Germany in VHS format.

In Asia, it has become a novel cinematic phenomenon for mainland China and Vietnam, which have adopted its poetics to form a completely new cinematic movement.

== See also ==
- Give the Devil His Due
- Prince Bayaya
- The Prince Beyond the Seven Seas
- The Princess with the Golden Star on Her ForeHead
- The Seven Ravens
- Three Wishes for Cinderella
