= Ondřej Kepka =

Czech actor, director and scriptwriter

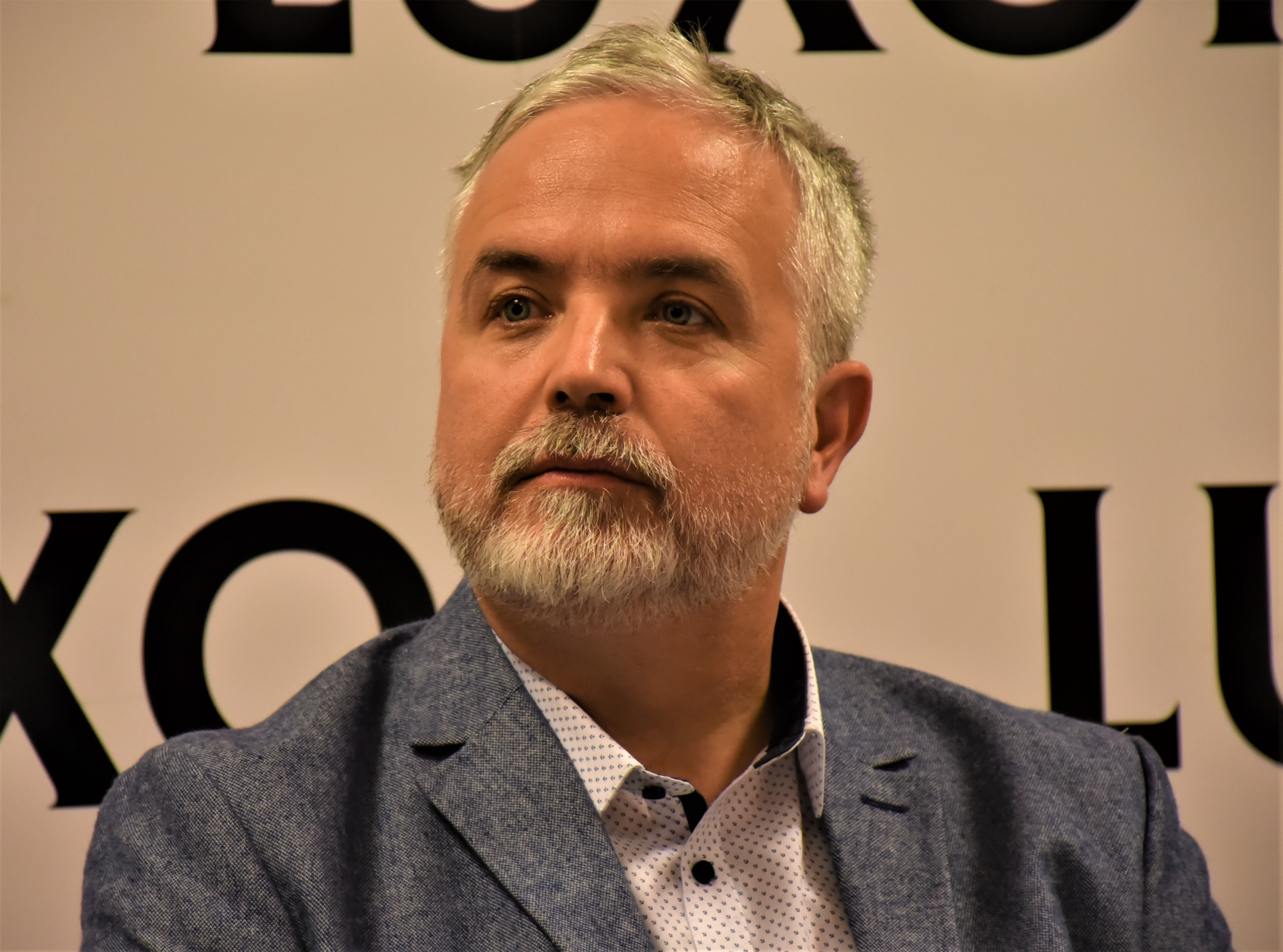
- Kepka in 2019
- Born: 28 September 1969 (age 56); Prague, Czechoslovakia (now Czech Republic)
- Education: Theatre Faculty of the Academy of Performing Arts in Prague and Film and TV School of the Academy of Performing Arts in Prague
- Occupations: Actor, director, photographer, presenter, screenwriter
- Years active: 1979 - present
- Website: ondrejkepka.com

Ondřej Kepka (born 28 September 1969 in Prague) is a Czech actor, film director, screenwriter, presenter and photographer.

== Career ==
Starting at six years of age, he performed in several children's films; he also started on Czech Radio programs. His acting includes roles in the popular TV series Arabela and Arabela returns. After graduation from the Theatre Faculty of the Academy of Performing Arts in Prague in acting in 1992, he continued the study of the film director at the Film and TV School of the Academy of Performing Arts in Prague; he graduated from the latter in 1996. His acting theaters includes Divadlo pod Palmovkou and Studio GAG by Boris Hybner. On Czech Radio, he moderates the "Noční mikrofórum" program.

Since November 2017, he has been President of the Czech Association of Actors ("Herecká asociace").

== Filmography ==
His works include:

=== Film ===
- 1995 - Tvůj svět (student film)
- 1996 - Dívka se zázračnou pamětí (TV film), Když sbírala jsem rozmarýn (theater recording)
- 1998 - Hřích faráře Ondřeje (TV film)
- 1999 - Spirála nenávisti (TV film)
- 2003 - Stará láska nerezaví (TV film)
- 2004 - Smetanový svět (TV film), Zakletá třináctka (TV film)
- 2006 - Poslední kouzlo (TV film)
- 2007 - V jámě lvové (theatre recording), Začarovaná láska (TV film)
- 2008 - Bekyně mniška (TV film), Picasso (theatre recording), Smrt Pavla I. (theatre recording), Ten třetí (theatre recording)
- 2012 - Scapinova šibalství (theatre recording)
- 2013 - Poprvé vdaná (theatre recording)
- 2016 - Den opričníka (theatre recording)

=== TV series ===
- 2004 - 3 plus 1, with Miroslav Donutil
- 2005 - To nevymyslíš!, Ulice

=== Documentary films ===
- 1995 - Obyčejné věci člověka (TV film)
- 1996 - Příběh knihy kostýmů (TV film)
- 1998 - Cesta ke slunci (TV film), Obyčejný život (TV film)
- 2000 - Osudy hvězd: Julie... Lucie Vondráčková (TV film)
- 2002 - Příběhy slavných: Byla jsem na světě (TV film)
- 2003 - Předčasná úmrtí: Sobí ráno (TV film)
- 2005 - Návštěva u Radovana Lukavského (TV film)
- 2007 - Den v DD (TV film), Osudy hvězd: Veronika Týblová (TV film)
- 2008 - Karel Čapek a jeho obyčejný svět (TV film)
- 2009 - Městské divadlo Mladá Boleslav (TV film), Neobyčejné životy (TV series)
- 2010 - Království poezie Gabriely Vránové (TV film)
- 2011 - Neobyčejné životy: Gustav Oplustil, Příběhy slavných: Poslední romantik
- 2012 - Neobyčejné životy: Emília Vášáryová (TV film)
- 2013 - Příběhy slavných - Frajer a fanfarón (TV series)
- 2014 - 4H aneb Hovory o herectví v hotelu Hoffmeister: Jiřina Jirásková, Radovan Lukavský
- 2015 - Dopisy od Karla Čapka (TV film)

=== DVD ===
- 2010 - Království poezie (Kingdom of poetry)
- 2011 - Ondřejova filmová škola (in Czech) – 33 popular video learning series for the starting film producers

== Sources ==
- Article contains translated text from Ondřej Kepka on the Czech Wikipedia retrieved on 18 January 2018.
