= Jana Andresíková =

Czech actress (1941–2020)

- Born: 2 April 1941; Kroměříž, Czechoslovakia
- Died: 19 October 2020 (aged 79); Mělník, Czech Republic
- Occupation: Actress

Jana Andresíková (2 April 1941 – 19 October 2020) was a Czech actress.

== Biography ==
Andresíková was born in Kroměříž, and studied acting at the Janáček Academy of Music and Performing Arts in Brno. After graduating in 1964, she went to Prague and obtained her first professional engagement at the Maringotka avant-garde theatre (1964–1966), after which she was a member of the "Divadlo za branou" (Theatre behind the Gate) for two years (1966–1968). From 1969 she left a permanent engagement and worked as a freelance actress.

Andresíková played a large number of film and television roles, mainly playing minor characters. Among others, she appeared in the movies ...a pozdravuji vlaštovky (... and I salute the swallows), Kouzelníkův návrat (The Magician's Return), Kukačka v temném lese (Cuckoo in the Dark Forest). She starred as Queen Elizabeth of Bohemia and starred in the TV movie The Last Queen (1975).

Among her best-known roles was the witch in the series Arabela (1979–1981). Due to serious injuries caused by a traffic accident at the time, she was unable to participate in post-production, so she was dubbed in this role by Jana Dítětová. In the second series she appeared as the mysterious Mrs. Černá.

Andresíková also worked as voice actor; among others, she dubbed Whoopi Goldberg in Sister Act, and in 2010 she was awarded the František Filipovský Prize for her dubbing career. Her last film role was the deranged Lejdy in Zdeněk Troška’s movies Kameňák and Kameňák 3.

Andresíková taught at Theatre Faculty of the Academy of Performing Arts in Prague and at the Private Acting School in Prague.

Andresíková died in Mělník, on 19 October 2020, at the age of 79, after a long-term illness and COVID-19-related health complications during the COVID-19 pandemic in the Czech Republic.

== Bibliography ==
- Fikejz, Miloš. Český film : herci a herečky. I. díl : A–K. 1. edition. Prague : Libri, 2009. 750 s. ISBN 978-80-7277-332-9. S. 22.
- Kdo je kdo : 91/92 : Česká republika, federální orgány ČSFR. Díl 1, A–M. Prague: Kdo je kdo. 1991. ISBN 80-901103-0-4.
- Osobnosti – Česko : Ottův slovník. Prague: Ottovo nakladatelství. 2008. ISBN 978-80-7360-796-8.
