= Carmen Sarmiento =

Spanish journalist and television presenter

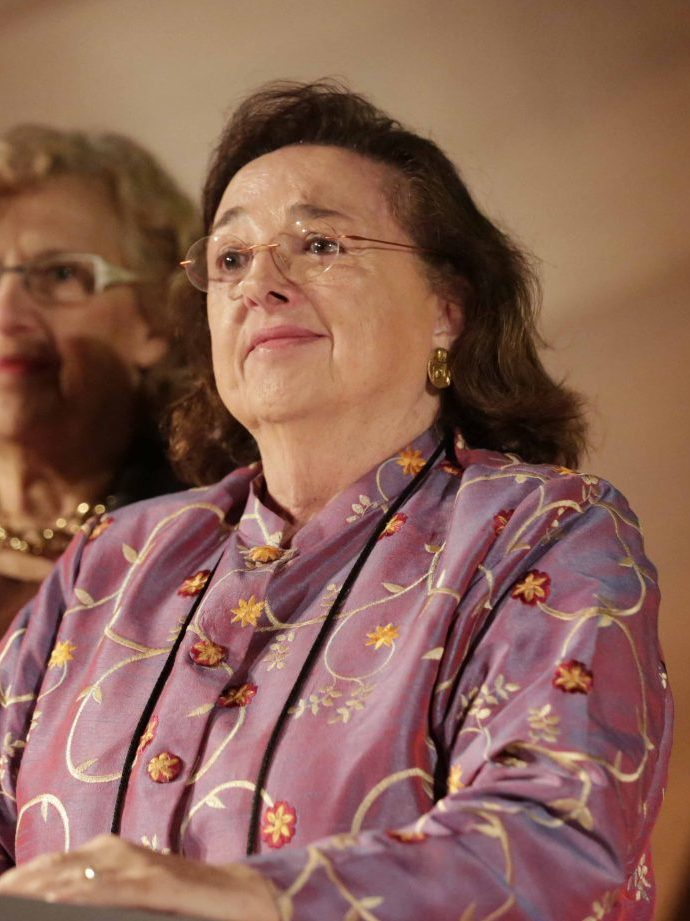
- Carmen Sarmiento (2017)
- Born: August 30, 1944 (age 81); Madrid
- Website: https://carmensarmiento.org/

Carmen Sarmiento (born 30 August 1944) is a Spanish journalist and television presenter specializing in international and social issues especially relating to feminism and disadvantaged women. She was a pioneering woman in war journalism.

== Biography ==
Carmen Sarmiento was born in Madrid on August 30, 1944. She started in Televisión Española in 1968 reporting in the International Information Services. Her early work was in programs such as Weekly Report, First page and Objective from 1979 to 1981. Sarmiento covered coups in Portugal, Argentina, Granada and Ghana. She was also a war correspondent in El Salvador, Nicaragua and Lebanon. Sarmiento interviewed Yasser Arafat, Fidel Castro and Rigoberta Menchú. She has won awards in recognition of her work.

In 1984 she premiered a series of reports on Outcasts on Televisión Española (TVE) which continued to 1991. In 1994, she focused on problems women experienced in Africa and Latin America and in 2000 she created Los excluidos working with the NGO Manos Unidas.

== Bibliography ==
- La mujer, una revolución en marcha, Madrid: Sedmay, 1976. ISBN 9788473800914, OCLC 892239734
- Sánchez Albornoz, cuarenta años después Madrid : Editorial Sedmay : Distribuidora Maydi, 1976. ISBN 9788473801102, OCLC 2374490
- Los marginados Ed. Ser. de Publ. del Ente Público RTV, 1985. OCLC 912643388
- Viajes a la marginación, Madrid Mondadori, 1990. ISBN 9788439717065, OCLC 254249214
- Cuaderno de viaje de Los Excluidos,
- Los excluidos. Cuadernos de viaje de Carmen Sarmiento, Barcelona : Oásis, 2000. ISBN 9788479016036, OCLC 44626115

== References and sources ==
IMDB
