= Doktoři z Počátků =

2013 Czech medical TV series

- Genre: Soap opera, medical drama
- Country of origin: Czech Republic
- No. of seasons: 5
- No. of episodes: 136

Production
- Running time: 60 minutes

Original release
- Network: TV Nova
- Release: 25 June 2013 – January 11, 2016

Doktoři z Počátků is a medical TV series from a picturesque Czech village broadcast on TV Nova from June 25, 2013, to January 11, 2016. It is a spin-off of the series Ordinace v růžové zahradě 2. The main character in the series is doctor Ota Kovář (Martin Stránský) from the Ordinace v růžové zahradě 2. The main characters are village doctors with different personalities and generational differences, but with one common enemy.

== Production ==
The series is a spin-off of the successful TV series Nova Ordinace v růžové zahradě 2. It is filmed in hospitality studios and in the central Bohemian village of Pyšely. The ratio of scenes in the exterior and interior is roughly balanced, compared to Ordinace, there is more shooting outside. So far, the series is preparing five series, over 32 episodes, and depending on the viewership, it will be seen whether the series will continue into the future. Series producer Lenka Hornová commented on the series: "We were thinking about if a character from Ordinace started to live his own life somewhere else, it seemed like an interesting idea to us," said Hornová, stating that it is a so-called spin-off. "It's a completely common term in the world. When something is successful, producers naturally want to ride on that success," added Hornová. On the series, Hornová works with the same screenwriters as on Ordinace, with Lucía Paulová, David Litvák and Lucía Konášová. When choosing which character from Ordinace will appear in the new spin-off, ten possible candidates were chosen, from which the character of Ota Kovář was finally chosen.

=== Name ===
The title was chosen to evoke the new beginnings that take place in the series. There is a town in the Czech Republic called Počátky, but the creators did not know about it and only found out after naming it. They even went to the city to see if it would be possible to shoot there, but it was far from the studio (in the Vysočina region in the Pelhřimov district) and the series would be more expensive overall.

=== Cancellation ===
On April 3, 2015, Naďa Konvalinková announced in an interview for Czech Radio that the filming of the series would end in May of the same year. The series was to end with the return of the character of Dr. Ota Kovář back to the series Ordinace v růžové zahradě 2.
