= Jana Nagyová (actress) =

Slovak actress

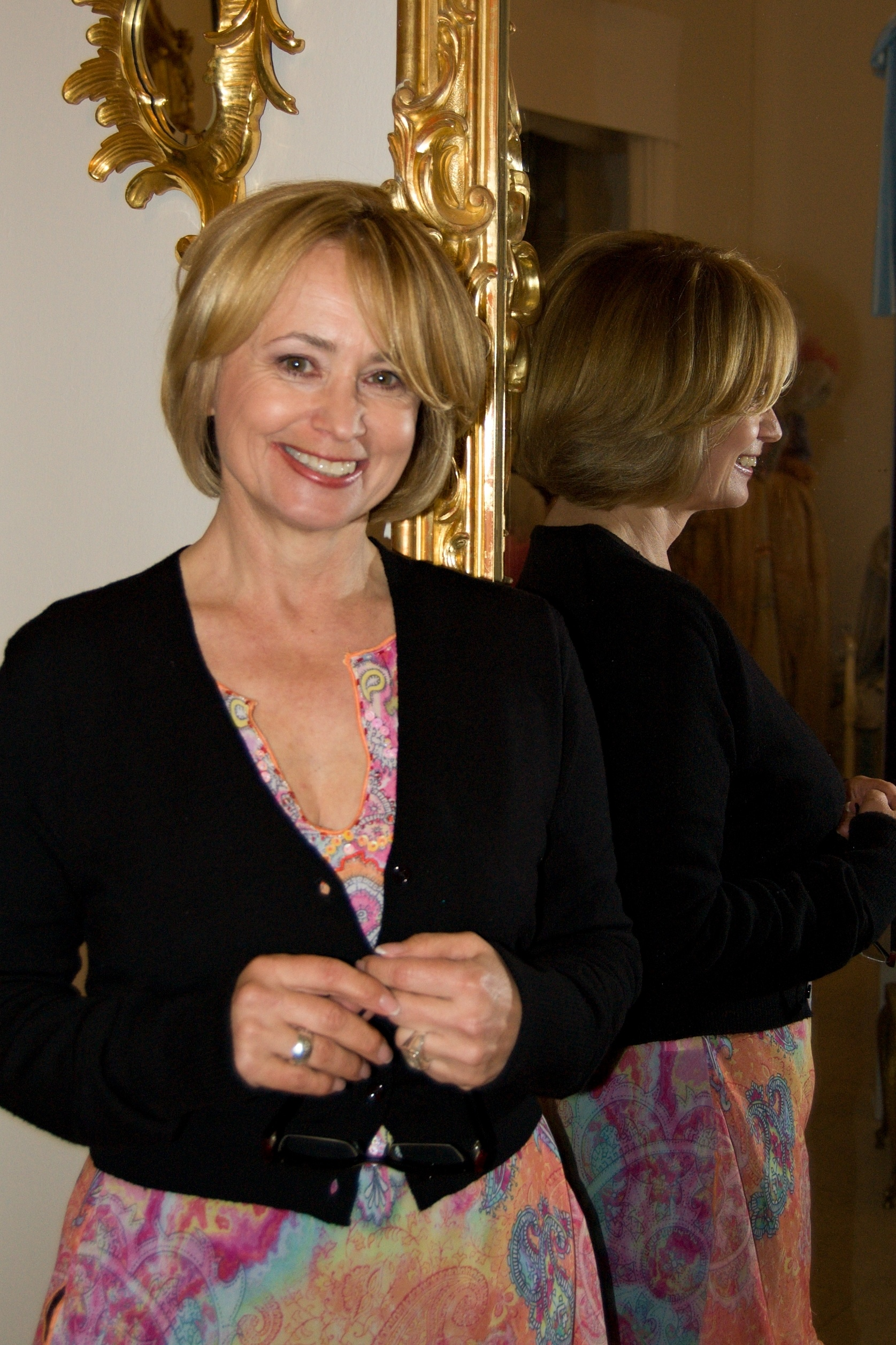
- Nagyová in 2010
- Born: 9 January 1959 (age 66); Komárno, Czechoslovakia
- Occupation: Actress
- Years active: 1972–1993

Jana Nagyová (born 9 January 1959) is a Slovak actress, best known for her portrayal as Princess Arabela in the Czechoslovak television series Arabela. She studied opera singing and piano at the Bratislava Conservatory.

== Selected filmography ==
- Penelope (1978)
- Smrt Stopařek ("Killing Hitchhikers", 1979)
- Arabela (television, 1980)
