= Pablo Lizcano =

Spanish journalist (1951–2009)

- Born: Pablo Lizcano Fernández; 25 April 1951; Madrid, Spain
- Died: 3 May 2009 (aged 58); Madrid, Spain
- Occupations: TV Presenter, Journalist
- Years active: 1981-2008
- Spouse(s): Massiel (m. 1985–1988), Rosa Montero (m. 1988–2009)

Pablo Lizcano (25 April 1951 – 3 May 2009) was a Spanish journalist. Among others, Lizcano had the opportunity to interview Luis Garcia Berlanga, Gonzalo Torrente Ballester and Manuel Vázquez Montalbán.

== Biography ==
Graduated in Political Science, after finishing his studies he began to collaborate in the newspaper Diario 16.

He became known in 1981 with the publication of the work La generación del 56, about the student revolts against the Franco regime that took place in Madrid in February 1956. The book, in its second edition (2006), has been prologued by the Ombudsman, Enrique Múgica Herzog.

In the following years, he dedicated himself to literary translation, and translated Mary Norton, Arnold Lobel and Tomi Ungerer, among others, into Spanish.

In 1984, he made his debut on Televisión Española with an in-depth interview programme called Autorretrato, which opened with an interview with the then booming muse of the Madrid scene, Olvido Gara, and which immediately captured the public's interest.

Among others, Lizcano had the opportunity to interview Luis García Berlanga, Juan Benet, Gonzalo Torrente Ballester, Manuel Vázquez Montalbán, Santiago Carrillo, Josep Tarradellas, Pedro Almodóvar, Alberto Closas, Amparo Rivelles or Ana Belén. And also the singer Massiel, whom he met on the occasion of the interview he conducted in the space and with whom he ended up marrying, a marriage that lasted from 1985 to 1988.

Between 1985 and 1987, Lizcano made Fin de siglo, a talk show with interviews and musical performances, for La 2 of TVE.

After his time on Televisión Española, he joined Cadena SER in October 1988 with Retratos, a program similar to the one she hosted for TV.

In the 1989-1990 season, he moved to the recently created regional channel Telemadrid, where he hosted the current affairs film show Butaca de patio.

In January 1993, he directed the Telemarathon of Antena 3, eight hours of live television, presented by Emilio Aragón and with the aim of raising funds for charitable causes.

Later, he was director of communication in different organizations and created an audiovisual communication company called b+c.

He was the partner of writer Rosa Montero until his death on 3 May 2009.
