= Pan Tau =

Czechoslovak children's television series

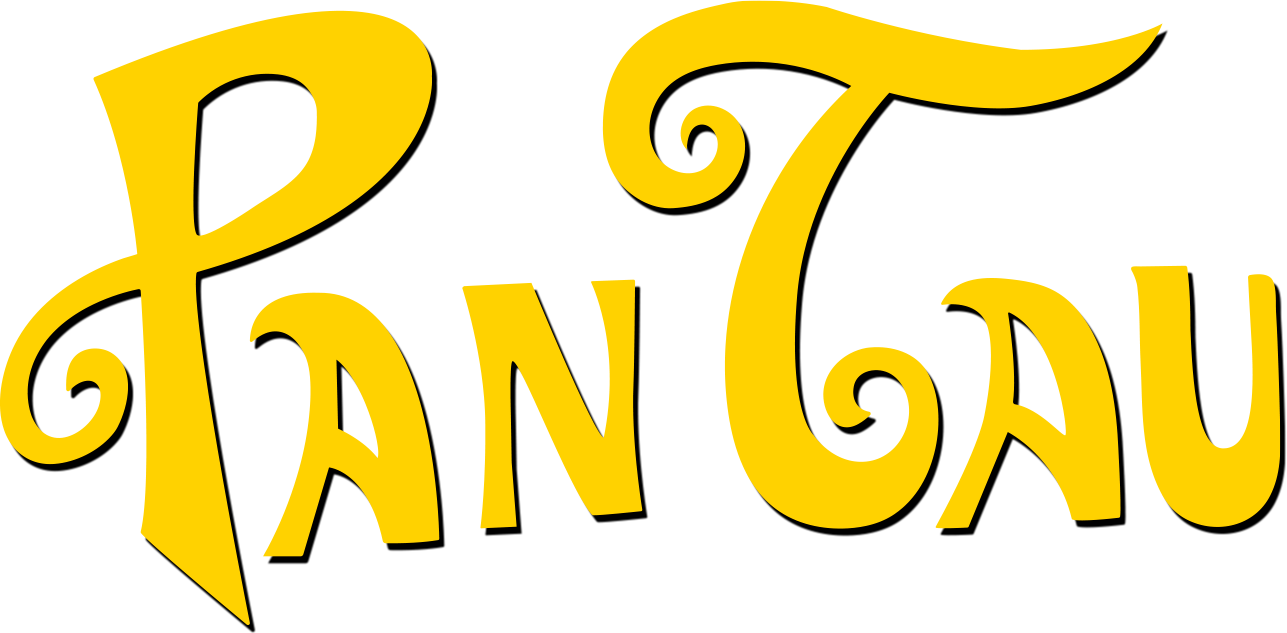
- Genre: Adventure, Comedy, Children's television series, fantasy
- Starring: Otto Šimánek; Vladimír Menšík; František Filipovský; Jiřina Bohdalová; Karel Höger and others down
- Countries of origin: Czechoslovakia; West Germany
- Original language: Czech
- No. of seasons: 3
- No. of episodes: 33

Production
- Editors: Ota Hofman; Jindřich Polák
- Production companies: Czechoslovak Television (ČST); Westdeutscher Rundfunk (WDR); Barrandov Studios

Original release
- Release: December 13, 1970 – February 4, 1979

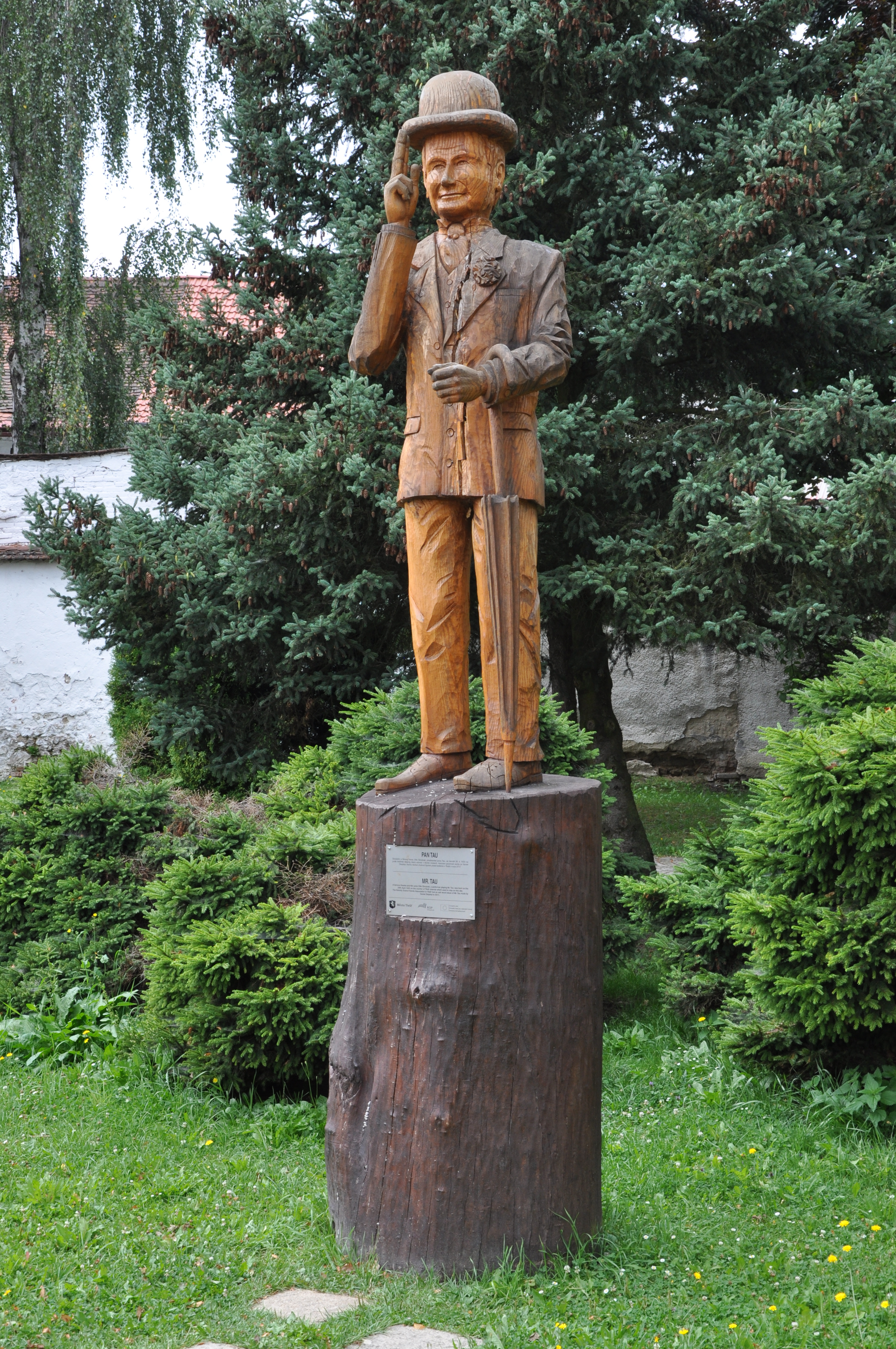
Wooden statue of Pan Tau in Třešť, hometown of actor Otto Šimánek

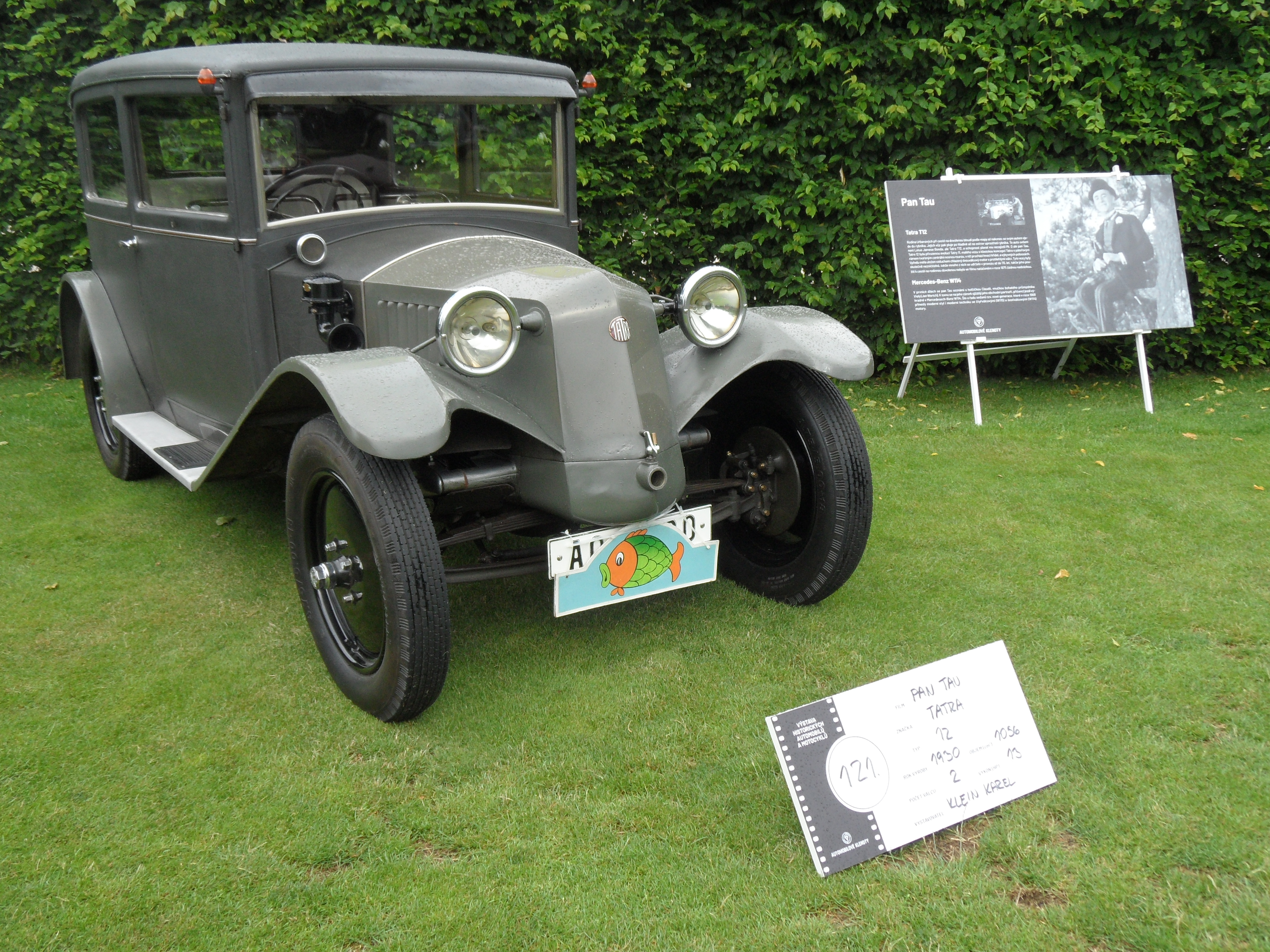
1930 Tatra 12, car used in the series

Pan Tau (Czech for "Mr. Tau") is a character created for a children's television series. There were 33 episodes in 3 series made by the Czechoslovak Television (ČST) in cooperation with Barrandov Studios and the West German TV network Westdeutscher Rundfunk (WDR). A pilot film was shot in 1966, and 33 episodes were made from 1970 until 1979. The project ended with a feature film in 1988.

The protagonist Pan Tau, who generally didn't speak and communicated through pantomime, was played by Otto Šimánek (1925–1992). The series was written by Ota Hofman and directed by Jindřich Polák. The plot of each episode was generally comical but contained some kind of problem for a child, and here Pan Tau found the way to solve the problem.

Pan Tau always had a gentle expression and a friendly smile, he was elegantly dressed in a stroller, with an umbrella and a white carnation in the lapel. Foremost, he was famous for his magic bowler hat. By tapping on his hat, Pan Tau was able to change his appearance into a puppet, to conjure up miscellaneous objects or to do other magic. His most characteristic behaviour is that he would help children who were experiencing some sort of difficulties in-between their dreams and reality, like finding a place for skiing, settling family problems on Christmas, and even give a boy a good time at a fair when he is supposed to have piano lessons. To adults, he usually remained invisible.

Although it was a children's program, made under a Communist regime, Pan Tau was popular on both sides of the Iron Curtain with children and adults alike.

Theodor Pištěk designed the costumes for the series.

Ten years after the end of the series, Šimánek again appeared as Pan Tau in a 1988 cinema film. He was also featured in the German singer Nena's 1990 music video for Du bist überall ("You Are Everywhere", from her Wunder gescheh'n studio album), which was shot in Prague.

In 2020 a reboot with Matt Edwards as Pan Tau produced by German broadcaster ARD was broadcast. Unlike the original, the 2020 reboot was filmed in English.

== Series overview ==
=== Pan Tau and First Adventure ===
==== Plot summary ====
Pan Tau makes his first appearance helping a young boy, who is reluctantly attending piano lessons, to overcome his boredom.

==== Cast ====
- Otto Šimánek - Pan Tau
- Václav Štekl - pianist teacher
- Vladimír Horka - pianist

=== First series ===
==== Cast ====
- Otto Šimánek - Pan Tau
- Josef Filip - Emil
- František Filipovský - Shop Owner
- Jiří Sovák - Emil's Father
- Slávka Budínová - Emil's Mother
- Josef Bevyl - Emil's Grandfather
- Blanka Krátká - Emil's Sister
- Veronika Renčová - Claudie
- Jan Werich - Claudie's Grandfather
- Věra Ferbasová, Věra Tichánková - Claudie's Educators
- Pavel Landovský - Taxi driver
- Václav Štekl - teacher
- Vladimír Hlavatý - School director
- Miroslav Homola - School inspektor
- Miloš Kopecký - Owner of losses and finds
- Václav Trégl - traveler
- Karel Effa - A migrator
- Milan Neděla - A migrator
- Stanislav Fišer - A migrator
- Václav Kotva - A migrator
- Jan Libíček - Publican
- Viktor Maurer - Hunter
- Václav Neckář - Television repairer

=== Second Series ===
==== Plot summary ====
Pan Tau meets dysfunctional family Urban and decides to bring back Alfonz, Father Urban's brother (and a dead lookalike of Pan Tau), from a lonely island Alfonz has fled to in his adventurous youth for a Robinson-like life.

==== Cast ====
- Otto Šimánek - Pan Tau, Alfonz Urban
- Jiřina Bohdalová - Mother Urban
- Vladimír Menšík - Father Urban
- František Filipovský - Grandfather Urban
- František Peterka - Neighbor
- Magda Křížková / Šebestová - Kateřina Urban
- Gustav Bubník - Rudolf Urban
- Karel Augusta - Secret policeman
- Svatopluk Beneš - Grandfather's brother
- Josef Somr - Petr Kalina / Doctor Azor
- Zdeněk Dítě - uncle Lojzík
- Eugen Jegorov - Father Kudrna
- Jiří Kúkol, J. Krafka - Adopted sons
- Jaroslav Štercl - Porter
- František Kovářík - Lecturer
- Jiří Vondráček - Martin (Kateřina Love)
- Jiří Hrzán - Mafia
- Jiří Vala - Mafia
- Bohuml Šmída - Mafia
- Josef Bláha - Mafia
- Jindřich Narenta - An employee of the weather institute
- Josef Kemr - An employee of the weather institute
- Václav Štekl - An employee of the weather institute
- Ladislav Potměšil - Driving school teacher
- Jana Hlaváčová - Teacher / later Alfonso's wife

=== Third Series ===
==== Cast ====
- Otto Šimánek - Pan Tau
- Vlastimil Brodský - 3. air traffic inspector Málek
- Josef Bláha - 1. air traffic inspector Kučera
- Jiří Kodet - Pilot
- Jiří Lábus - Dispatcher
- Petr Nárožný - Alenka's Father
- Michael Hofbauer - Otík Málek
- Zdena Hadrbolcová - Málek's wife
- Josef Dvořák - Transport for safari Jan Kalous
- Zdeněk Srstka - Transport for safari
- Lenka Termerová - Kalous's wife
- František Husák - Pilot powdering aircraft
- Robert Vrchota - Agronomist
- Jana Brejchová - Wizard Stella
- Mahulena Bočanová - Her daughter
- Vladimír Hrubý - Wizard Brehm from Berhm
- Petr Čepek - Wizard Orlando
- Václav Štekl - Organizer of the magical festival
- Antonín (strýček) Jedlička - Backdrop
- Marie Rosůlková - Grandmother
- Václav Lohniský - Cook Hurta
- Helena Růžičková - Cook from the camp near the creek
- Jan Skopeček - Driver with meat (Mirek's father)
- Karel Augusta - Drafts
- Josef Kemr - Grandfather Hanousek
- Tomáš Vacek - Mirek
- Julie Jurištová - Terezka / the lead of girls in the pioneer camp
- Jan Sedláček - Láďa / the lead of boys in the pioneer camp

== Episodes ==
- Pan Tau a první dobrodružství - Pan Tau and first adventure

=== First series ===
- Pan Tau přichází - Pan Tau is coming
- Pan Tau naděluje - Pan Tau gives gifts
- Pan Tau na horách - Pan Tau in the mountains
- Pan Tau a neděle - Pan Tau Sunday
- Pan Tau jde do školy - Pan Tau goes to school
- Pan Tau a samá voda - Pan Tau and a lot water.
- Pan Tau a Claudie - Pan Tau and Claudie
- Pan Tau to zařídí - Pan Tau will arrange it
- Pan Tau a cesta kolem světa - Pan Tau and journey around the world
- Pan Tau v cirkusu - Pan Tau in the circus
- Hledá se pan Tau - looking for Pan Tau
- Pan Tau a tisíc kouzel - Pan Tau and a thousand spells

=== Second series ===
- Pan Tau se vrací - Pan Tau is coming back
- Pan Tau a robinson - Pan Tau and robinson
- Pan Tau a příliš velký balón - Pan Tau and too big balloon
- Pan Tau a pes kozopes - Pan Tau and Dog Goat-Dog
- Pan Tau a rodinná slavnost - Pan Tau and Family festival
- Pan Tau jde do práce - Pan Tau go to work
- Pan Tau pět hrušek a tři jablka - Pan Tau five pear's and Three apple's
- Pan Tau a černý deštiník - Pan Tau and black umbrella
- Pan Tau a Velký Ples - Pan Tau and big festival
- Pan Tau a rosnička - Pan Tau and frog
- Pan Tau a Aladinova lampa - Pan Tau and Aladin's Lamp
- Pan Tau a zlatý kufr - Pan Tau and gold suitcase
- Pan Tau odchází - Pan Tau leaving

=== Third Series ===
- Poplach v oblacích - Alarm in the clouds
- Lov na Slona - Elephant hunting
- Noc v safari - Night in safari
- Pan Tau a kouzelnice - Pan Tau and sorceress
- Pan Tau na pionýrském táboře - Pan Tau on the pioneer camp
- A která je ta pravá - And which is the right one?
- Od zítřka nečaruji - From tomorrow I'm so not using magic

Third Series (7 episodes) was cut into two films - Poplach v oblacích (Czech - Alarm in the clouds, 1 - 3 episodes and episode 4 miss) and Od zítřka nečaruji (From tomorrow I'm so not using magic, 5 - 7 episodes)

== Trivia ==
- In 1970, a then unknown Ivana Marie Zelníčková (later Ivana Trump) appeared on Pan Tau in Season 1, Episode 3 "Pan Tau na horách" (Pan Tau in the mountains), which was her first television role.
