= List of Czech male actors =

A list of notable Czech male actors.

== A ==
- Josef Abrhám
- Jiří Adamíra

== B ==
- Jiří Bartoška
- Svatopluk Beneš
- Ladislav Boháč
- Vlastimil Brodský
- Radoslav Brzobohatý
- Jan Budař
- Vlasta Burian

== C ==
- František Ringo Čech
- Vladimír Čech
- Petr Čepek

== D ==
- Martin Dejdar
- Zdeněk Dítě
- Vladimír Dlouhý
- Miroslav Donutil
- Jan Antonín Duchoslav
- Rudolf Antonín Dvorský
- Jiří Dvořák
- Josef Dvořák

== E ==
- Marek Eben

== F ==
- Eman Fiala
- Ladislav Fialka
- František Filipovský
- Miloš Forman
- Martin Frič
- Ferenc Futurista

== G ==
- Jiří Grossmann

== H ==
- Hugo Haas
- Tomáš Hanák
- Petr Haničinec
- František Hanus
- Jan Hartl
- Karel Hašler
- Ondřej Havelka
- Karel Heřmánek
- Juraj Herz
- Gustav Hilmar
- Josef Hlinomaz
- Jiří Holý
- Felix Holzmann
- Miroslav Horníček
- Zdeněk Hruška
- Jan Hrušínský
- Rudolf Hrušínský
- Matěj Hádek
- Karel Höger
- Daniel Hůlka

== J ==
- Petr Jákl
- Ivan Jandl
- Vladimír Javorský
- Jan Jílek

== K ==
- Karel Kachyňa
- Oldřich Kaiser
- Josef Karlík
- Josef Kemr
- Milos Kirek
- Gertan Klauber
- Jiří Kodet
- Eduard Kohout
- Josef Jiří Kolár
- Miloš Kopecký
- Otomar Korbelář
- Jiří Korn
- Petr Kostka
- Václav Kotva
- Přemysl Kočí
- Jiří Krampol
- Jan Kraus
- Karel Krautgartner
- Otomar Krejča
- Miroslav Krobot
- Adolf Krössing

== L ==
- Jiří Lábus
- Karel Lamač
- Daniel Landa
- Pavel Landovský
- Lubomír Lipský
- Václav Lohniský
- Herbert Lom
- Radovan Lukavský

== M ==
- Jiří Macháček
- Miroslav Macháček
- Jiří Mádl
- Jaroslav Marvan
- Tomáš Matonoha
- Jiří Menzel
- Vladimír Menšík
- Martin Miller
- Antonín Molčík
- Miroslav Moravec
- Jaroslav Moučka
- Luděk Munzar

== N ==
- Oldřich Navrátil
- Robert Nebřenský
- Václav Neckář
- Gustav Nezval
- Oldřich Nový
- Petr Nárožný

== P ==
- Ladislav Pešek
- Theodor Pištěk
- Jindřich Plachta
- Jiří Pleskot
- Bronislav Poloczek
- Bolek Polívka
- Jan Potměšil
- George Pravda
- Viktor Preiss
- Antonín Procházka
- Jaroslav Průcha

== R ==
- Čestmír Řanda
- Filip Renč
- Karel Roden
- Zdeněk Rohlíček
- Boris Rösner
- Matouš Ruml
- Břetislav Rychlík
- Vladimír Ráž
- Martin Růžek

== S ==
- Jaroslav Satoranský
- Jan Schmid
- Jiří Schmitzer
- Miloslav Šimek
- Otto Šimánek
- Ota Sklenčka
- Jan Skopeček
- Jiří Šlitr
- Viktor Skála
- Čeněk Šlégl
- Vladimír Šmeral
- Ladislav Smoljak
- František Smolík
- Karel Smyczek
- Luděk Sobota
- Ondřej Sokol
- Josef Somr
- Jiří Sovák
- Zdeněk Srstka
- Milan Šteindler
- Jan Nepomuk Štěpánek
- Martin Štěpánek
- Zdeněk Štěpánek
- Jiří Strach
- Martin Stropnický
- Michal Suchánek
- Jiří Suchý
- Josef Šváb-Malostranský
- Petr Svoboda
- Petr Svojtka
- Alois Švehlík
- David Švehlík
- Jan Svěrák
- Zdeněk Svěrák

== T ==
- Marek Taclík
- Lubor Tokoš
- Ivan Trojan
- Ondřej Trojan
- Václav Trégl
- Miroslav Táborský
- Jan Tříska

== V ==
- Lukáš Vaculík
- Marek Vašut
- Karel Velebný
- Oldřich Velen
- Ondřej Vetchý
- Josef Vinklář
- Eduard Vojan
- Jaroslav Vojta
- Pavel Vondruška
- Tomáš Vorel
- Václav Voska
- Jiří Voskovec
- Jiří Vršťala
- Ivan Vyskočil

== W ==
- Jan Werich

== Z ==
- Pavel Zedníček
- Martin Zounar
