= Cirkus Humberto =

Czechoslovak television series

- Genre: Drama
- Written by: Oldřich Lipský
- Directed by: František Filip
- Country of origin: Czechoslovakia
- No. of episodes: 12

Production
- Running time: 50 minutes

Original release
- Release: 1988

Cirkus Humberto is a Czechoslovak television programme which was first broadcast in 1988. The programme was directed by František Filip.

== Cast ==
- Jaromír Hanzlík
- Petr Haničinec
- Kathy Kriegel
- Josef Kemr
- Martin Růžek
- Jiřina Bohdalová
- Radoslav Brzobohatý
- Claudine Coster
- Josef Dvořák
- Jiří Bartoška
- Petr Nárožný
- Iva Janžurová
- Katja Rupé
- Werner Possardt
- Václav Postránecký
- Oldřich Vízner
- Kateřina Macháčková
- Lubomír Lipský
- Josef Somr
- Jiří Lábus
- Radovan Lukavský
- Josef Laufer
- Jiří Holý
- Vladimír Krška
- Pavel Mang
- Martina Hudečková
- Pavel Vondruška
- Jana Janatová
- Karolína Kubalová
- Adolf Filip
- František Němec
- Jana Paulová
- Wolfgang Bathke
- Hana Brejchová
- Jana Hlaváčová
- Josef Abrhám
- Patrick Préjean
- Libuše Šafránková
- Dagmar Havlová
- Jaroslava Adamová
- Svatopluk Beneš
- Vlastimil Drbal
- Hana Gregorová
- Miloslav Homola
- Václav Kotva
- Taťjana Medvecká
- Josef Větrovec
- Jana Šulcová
- Stanislav Fišer
- Jiří Lír
- Viktor Preiss
- Martin Stropnický
- Robert Vrchota
- Petr Skarke
- Igor Smržík
- Rudolf Vodrážka
- Antonín Jedlička
- Rudolf Hrušínský jr.
- Marek Pavlovský
- Tereza Vokurková
- Josef Kubíček
- Oldřich Velen
- Jana Boušková
- Vladimír Pospíšil
- Hugo Kaminský
- Hanuš Bor
- Karel Chromík
- Otakar Brousek Sr.
- František Hanus
- Klára Lidová
- Barbora Kohoutková
- Kurt Conradi
- Dietrich Adam
- Jörg von Liebenfelß
- Radovan Lukavský (voice)
- Pavla Mixtajová
- Lumír Banat
- Hussain Ibrahim Hussain
- Amarnath Chatterjee
- Jiří Bubeníček
- Otto Bubeníček
- D. Halušková
- R. Hadrovský
- Daniel Štipka
- Št. Hlinovská
