= Marta Vančurová =

Czech actress

- Born: 7 September 1948 (age 78); Prague, Czechoslovakia (now Czech Republic)
- Occupation: Actress
- Years active: 1970-present

Marta Vančurová (born 7 September 1948) is a Czech actress. She has finished the Faculty of Theatre (Prague) and appeared in more than 30 films and television shows since 1970. In 2019, she performed in several shows at the Theatre Studio DVA.

== Selected filmography ==
- Lovers in the Year One (1973)
- Jáchyme, hoď ho do stroje! (1974)
- Day for My Love (1976)
- Forbidden Dreams (1986)
- Men in Rut (2009)
