= Luděk Munzar =

Czech actor (1933–2019)

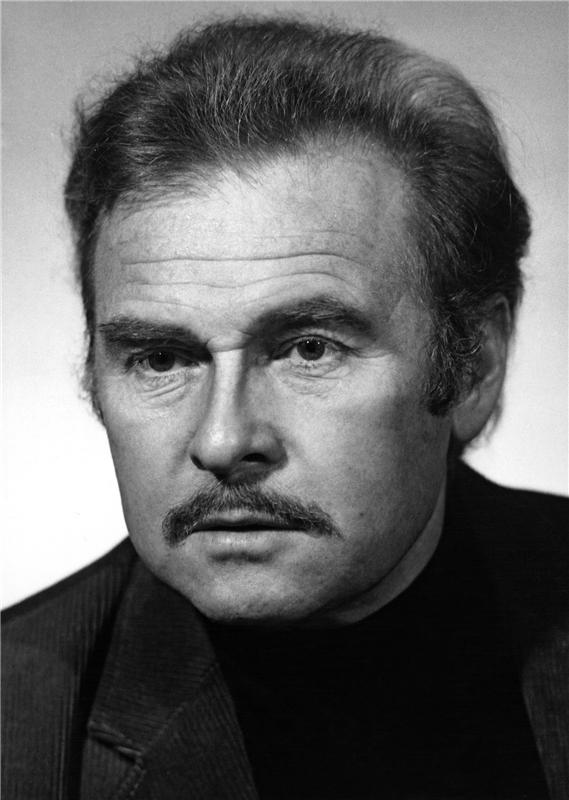
- Born: Luděk Munzar; 20 March 1933; Nová Včelnice, Czechoslovakia
- Died: 26 January 2019 (aged 85); Prague, Czech Republic
- Education: DAMU
- Occupation: Actor
- Years active: 1956–2014
- Spouses: Naděžda Munzarová (m. 1957; div. 1964) Jana Hlaváčová (m. 1965)
- Children: Johana Munzarová; Barbora Munzarová

Luděk Munzar (20 March 1933 in Nová Včelnice – 26 January 2019 in Modřany, Prague) was a Czech actor. He appeared in the Czech New Wave film The Joke (Jaromil Jireš, 1969) and starred in the film Poslední propadne peklu under director Ludvík Ráža in 1982.

Quote of the article at Radio Praha: "Munzar war einer der bedeutendsten Film- und Bühnendarsteller seiner Zeit, er genießt hierzulande den Ruf einer Legende. Er gehörte über 30 Jahre zum Schauspielensemble des Prager Nationaltheaters. Auf der Bühne trat er oft gemeinsam mit seiner Frau Jana Hlaváčová auf." (in English: "Munzar was one of the most important film and stage actors of his time, he enjoys the reputation of a legend here in the Czech Republic He belonged to the acting ensemble of the Prague National Theatre for more than 30 years. On stage he often appeared together with his wife Jana Hlaváčová.")

In the Czech Republic he was also known as the synchronized voice of Paul Newman in movies.

== Decorations ==
Awarded by Czech Republic

- Medal of Merit (2024)
