= Vršovice Cemetery =

Cemetery in Prague, Czech Republic

- Vršovický hřbitov
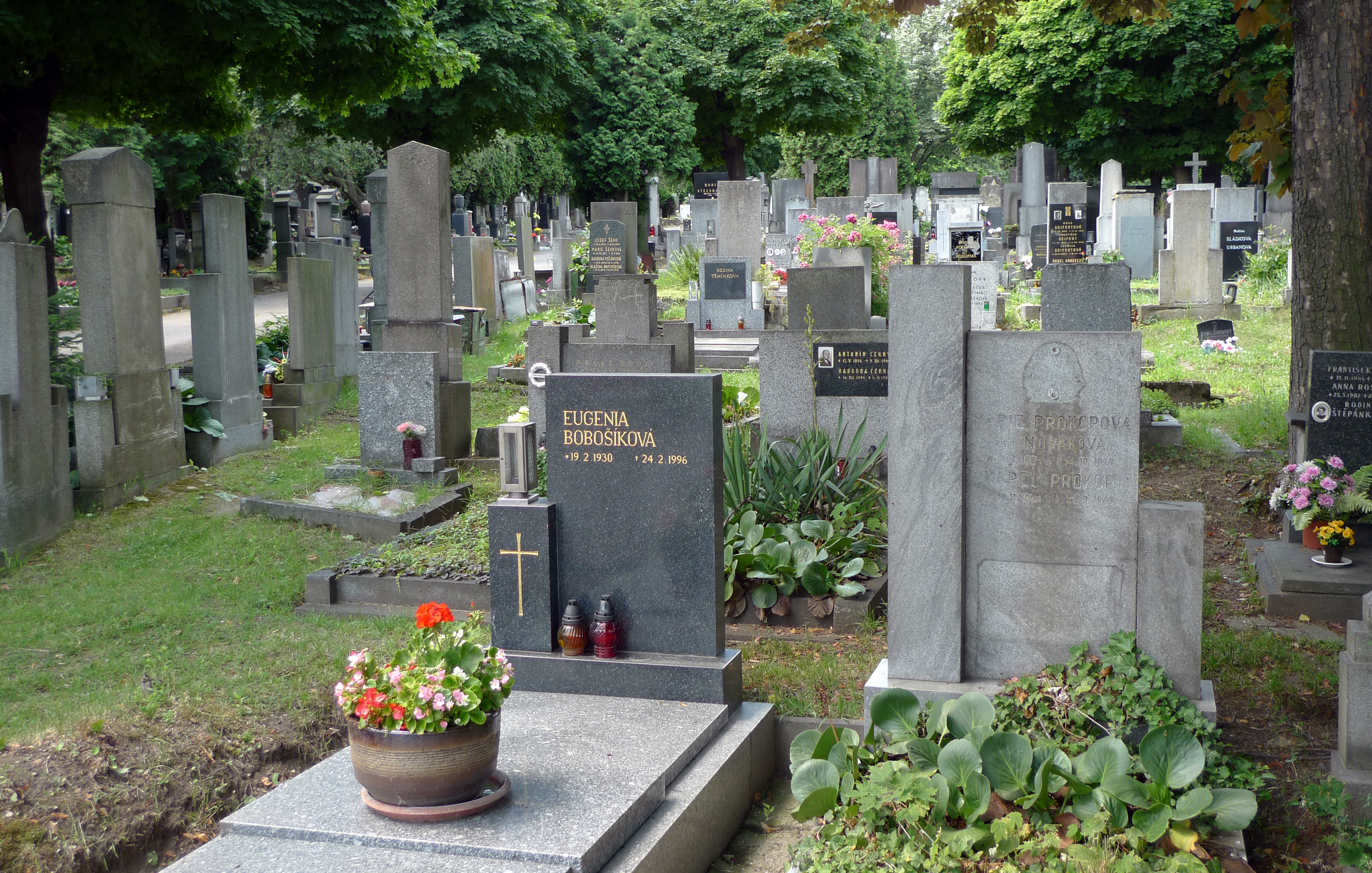
- the cemetery
- Interactive map of the Vršovice Cemetery area

General information
- Type: Cemetery
- Location: Prague, Czech Republic
- Coordinates: 50.06368°N 14.4676°E
- Owner: City of Prague, Czech Republic

Vršovice Cemetery (in Czech: Vršovický hřbitov) is a cemetery in Vršovice in Prague 10.

== Notable burials ==
The people buried here are amongst others the circus owner Henry Kludský, the composer Bedrich Nicodemus, the writer Rudolf Černý, the painter Zdeněk Glückselig, children's TV presenter Štěpánka Haničincová.

== Heritage ==
As part of the European Heritage Days initiative this cemetery was opened to the public in September 2012.
