= The Night Guest =

The Night Guest may refer to:

- The Night Guest (film), a 1961 Czechoslovak drama film
- The Night Guest (novel), a 2013 novel by Fiona McFarlane
