= Michaela Kudláčková =

Czech actress

- Born: 21 August 1968 (age 56); Prague, Czechoslovakia (now Czech Republic)
- Occupation: Actress
- Years active: 1980–1985
- Children: 4

Michaela Kudláčková (born 21 August 1968 in Prague) is a former Czech child actress. She starred in the film Poslední propadne peklu under director Ludvík Ráža in 1982.
