= Poslední propadne peklu =

1982 film by Ludvík Ráža

- Directed by: Ludvík Ráža
- Written by: Ludvík Ráža; Ondřej Vogeltanz
- Starring: Michaela Kudláčková
- Cinematography: Andrej Barla
- Edited by: Josef Valušiak
- Release date: 1982
- Running time: 83 minutes
- Country: Czechoslovakia
- Language: Czech

Poslední propadne peklu is a Czech adventure film directed by Ludvík Ráža. It was released in 1982.

== Cast ==
- Michaela Kudláčková as Magdalena
- Ivan Vyskočil as Matouš Psík
- Bruno O'Ya as Hoff
- Luděk Munzar as Vaněk
- Josef Karlík as Kryštof
- Dagmar Veškrnová as Keruše
- Jiří Holý as Kašehrnek
- Petr Haničinec as Bartoš
- Martin Růžek as Holoubek
- Boris Rösner as Sepp
- Josef Somr as Physicus
- Ota Sklenčka as Reeve
- Petr Oliva as Niklas
- Zdeněk Srstka as Bastl
- Miroslav Moravec as Poďobaný

== Production ==
Michaela Kudláčková said she broke her leg during filming. "That's when they shot the scene of the girl running through the battle. Mr. Ráza, the director, wanted to make it as dramatic as possible, so he made up the idea of a dead soldier falling on the girl from a passing car. Unfortunately, he didn't think it through. The stuntman was about six feet tall and I was only forty kilos with my bed... When he fell on me, my tibia "snapped" and I ended up with my leg in a cast." Kudlacková said it was complicated to finish the film, "Because we were filming in the spring and I didn't recover until the summer. So we had to wait until autumn, when nature looks similar. Over the summer, we did scenes where I'm sitting and there's no need for my legs to be visible."
