= Lovers in the Year One =

1973 film

- Directed by: Jaroslav Balík
- Written by: Jan Otčenášek; Jaroslav Balík
- Starring: Marta Vančurová
- Cinematography: Jan Čuřík
- Release date: 1973
- Running time: 95 minutes
- Country: Czechoslovakia
- Language: Czech

Lovers in the Year One (Czech: Milenci v roce jedna) is a 1973 Czechoslovak drama film directed by Jaroslav Balík. It was selected as the Czechoslovak entry for the Best Foreign Language Film at the 47th Academy Awards, but was not accepted as a nominee.

== Cast ==
- Marta Vančurová as Helena Poláková
- Viktor Preiss as Pavel Krouza
- Libuše Švormová as Olga
- Petr Svojtka as Evžen
- Jana Švandová as Jana
- Ota Sklenčka as Režisér
- Bedřich Prokoš as Professor
- Jiří Kodet as Assistant
- Jan Teplý as Mladík
- Naďa Konvalinková as Jarmila
- Jitka Smutná as Zdena
- Jitka Zelenohorská as Jitka
- Zuzana Geislerová as Věra

== See also ==
- List of submissions to the 47th Academy Awards for Best Foreign Language Film
- List of Czechoslovak submissions for the Academy Award for Best Foreign Language Film
