= Jáchyme, hoď ho do stroje! =

1974 Czechoslovak comedy film

- Directed by: Oldřich Lipský
- Written by: Oldřich Lipský; Ladislav Smoljak; Zdeněk Svěrák
- Starring: Luděk Sobota
- Cinematography: Jaroslav Kučera
- Edited by: Miroslav Hájek
- Music by: Zdeněk Liška
- Distributed by: Národní filmový archiv
- Release date: 1 August 1974
- Running time: 95 minutes
- Country: Czechoslovakia
- Language: Czech

Jáchyme, hoď ho do stroje! (lit. Joachim, Put It in the Machine!) is a 1974 Czechoslovak comedy film directed by Oldřich Lipský.

== Cast ==
- Luděk Sobota as František Koudelka
- Marta Vančurová as Blanka
- Věra Ferbasová as František's aunt
- Josef Dvořák as Bedřich Hudeček
- Ladislav Smoljak as Karfík
- Zdeněk Svěrák as Klasek
- Karel Novák as innkeeper
- Václav Lohniský as Doctor Chocholoušek
- Eva Fiedlerová as Mrs. Nevyjelová
- František Husák as attendant Arnošt
- Josef Hlinomaz as attendant Arnošt
- Miroslav Homola as speaker
- Lubomír Lipský as gatekeeper
- Petr Nárožný as car racer Volejník
- Eva Svobodová as František's mother
