= Josef Karlík =

Czech actor and professor

- Born: 19 March 1928; Kroměříž, Czechoslovakia
- Died: 30 October 2009 (aged 81); Brno, Czech Republic
- Occupation: Actor
- Years active: 1962–1999
- Spouse: Jarmila Palivcová

Josef Karlík (19 March 1928, in Kroměříž – 30 October 2009, in Brno) was a Czech actor. He starred in the film Poslední propadne peklu under director Ludvík Ráža in 1982.

== Selected filmography ==
- Jak dostat tatínka do polepšovny (1978)
- Poslední propadne peklu (1982)
