= The Stolen Airship =

- Directed by: Karel Zeman
- Written by: Radovan Krátky; Karel Zeman (screenplay); Jules Verne (story)
- Produced by: Zdeněk Novák
- Cinematography: Josef Novotný; Bronislau Pikhart
- Edited by: Jan Chaloupek
- Music by: Jan Novák
- Release date: 1966
- Running time: 88 minutes
- Countries: Italy; Czechoslovakia
- Language: Czech
- Budget: 4 Million KČs

The Stolen Airship (Czech: Ukradená vzducholoď; Italian: I ragazzi del capitano Nemo) is a 1966 live-action/animated film by Czech filmmaker Karel Zeman. The story is based loosely on Jules Verne's novels Two Years' Vacation and The Mysterious Island. The film in Art Nouveau style consists of live-action scenes, generally shot in black and white, as well as hand-drawn, stop motion, and cutout animation. Various live-action and animated elements are often composited into the same scene.

== Cast ==
- Hanuš Bor as Tomáš Dufek
- Jan Čížek as Martin
- Jan Malát as Petr
- Michal Pospíšil as Jakoubek Kůrka
- Josef Stráník as Pavel
- Jitka Zelenohorská as Katka Tenfieldová
- Jana Sedlmajerová as Renata (sekretářka)
- Věra Macků as Martin's mother
- Eva Kubešová as Dufková
- Marie Brožová as Jakoubek's grandmother
