= Ota Sklenčka =

Czech actor (1919–1993)

- Born: December 19, 1919; Hradec Králové, Czechoslovakia
- Died: October 10, 1993 (aged 73); Prague, Czech Republic
- Occupation: Actor
- Years active: 1951-1993

Ota Sklenčka (19 December 1919 in Hradec Králové – 10 October 1993 in Prague) was a Czech actor. He starred in the film Poslední propadne peklu under director Ludvík Ráža in 1982.

== Selected filmography ==
- Lovers in the Year One (1973)
- Poslední propadne peklu (1982)
