= Zdeněk Srstka =

Czech actor and stuntman (1935–2019)

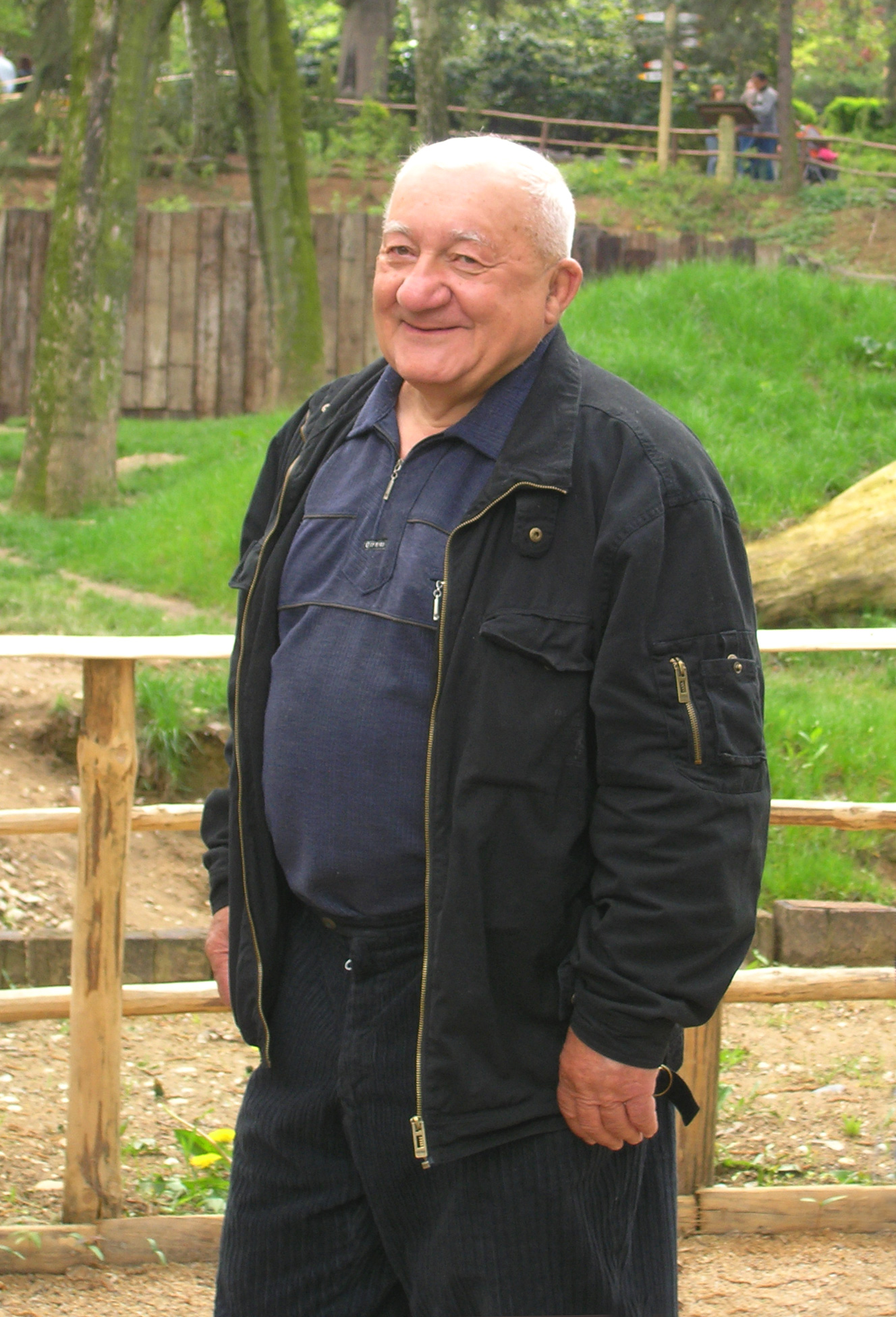
- Zdeněk Srstka in 2008
- Born: 26 September 1935; Prague, Czechoslovakia
- Died: 29 July 2019 (aged 83)
- Occupations: Actor, stuntman, weightlifter
- Years active: 1962–2019

Zdeněk Srstka (26 September 1935, Prague – 29 July 2019) was a Czech actor, stuntman and weightlifter. He starred in the film Poslední propadne peklu under director Ludvík Ráža in 1982.

He competed for Czechoslovakia in the 1960 Summer Olympics with the result of ninth place.
