= Boris Rösner =

Czech actor (1951–2006)

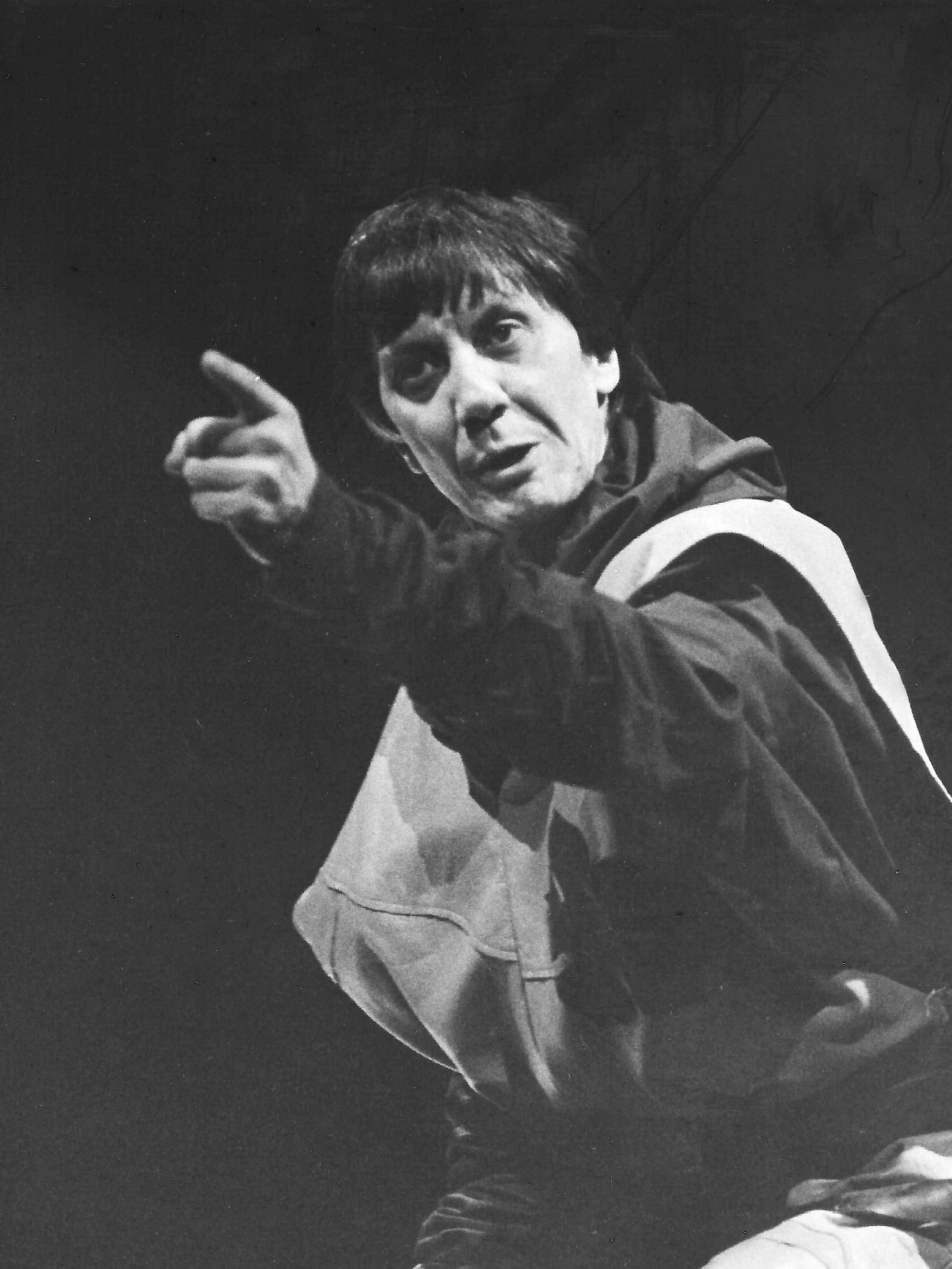
- Born: 25 January 1951; Opava, Czechoslovakia
- Died: 31 May 2006 (aged 55); Kladno, Czech Republic
- Occupation: Actor
- Years active: 1972–2004

Boris Rösner (25 January 1951 – 31 May 2006) was a Czech actor. He starred in the film Poslední propadne peklu under director Ludvík Ráža in 1982.
