= The Night Guest (film) =

1961 film

- Theatrical release poster
- Directed by: Otakar Vávra
- Written by: Ludvík Aškenazy; Otakar Vávra
- Starring: Jiří Vala; Martin Růžek; Rudolf Hrušínský
- Cinematography: Jaroslav Tuzar
- Edited by: Antonín Zelenka
- Music by: Jiří Srnka
- Release date: September 29, 1961
- Running time: 90 minutes
- Country: Czechoslovakia
- Language: Czech

The Night Guest (Czech: Noční host) is a 1961 Czechoslovak drama film directed by Otakar Vávra. The film starred Rudolf Hrušínský.

== Cast ==
- Jiří Vala as Innkeeper Emil Kalous
- Martin Růžek as Alois Remunda
- Rudolf Hrušínský as Walter Huppert
- Jana Hlaváčová as Student Jana
- Světla Amortová as Marie Kalousová, Emil's mother
- Vladimír Brabec as Policeman Vítek Hrabal
- Jiří Štíbr as Boy
- Marie Poslušná as Girl
- Jaroslav Moučka as Driver Mikeš
