= Blázni, vodníci a podvodníci =

1981 Czechoslovak film

- Directed by: Tomás Svoboda
- Written by: Eman Kanera; David Jan Novotný
- Starring: Luděk Sobota; Dagmar Havlová; Jiří Lábus
- Cinematography: Emil Sirotek
- Edited by: Jaromír Janácek
- Music by: Vladimír Zahradnícek; Jiří Šust
- Production company: Filmové studio Barrandov
- Release date: 1 May 1981 (Czechoslovakia)
- Running time: 79 min
- Country: Czechoslovakia
- Language: Czech

Blázni, vodníci a podvodníci is a 1980 Czechoslovak film. The film is a comedy following protagonist siblings Zuzana (played by actress Dagmar Havlová) and Petr (played by actor Jiří Lábus).The film also starred Josef Kemr.
