= Forbidden Dreams =

1986 Czech drama film

- DVD cover
- Directed by: Karel Kachyňa
- Written by: Ota Pavel; Karel Kachyňa; Dušan Hamšík
- Based on: Forbidden Dreams by Ota Pavel
- Produced by: Oldřich Mach
- Starring: Karel Heřmánek; Marta Vančurová; Rudolf Hrušínský
- Cinematography: Vladimír Smutný
- Edited by: Jiří Brožek
- Music by: Luboš Fišer
- Distributed by: Ústřední půjčovna filmů
- Release date: July 1987
- Running time: 91 minutes
- Country: Czechoslovakia
- Language: Czech

Forbidden Dreams (Czech: Smrt krásných srnců, translated as Death of Beautiful Roebucks) is a 1986 Czech drama film directed by Karel Kachyňa. It was entered into the 15th Moscow International Film Festival. The film was selected as the Czechoslovak entry for the Best Foreign Language Film at the 60th Academy Awards, but was not accepted as a nominee.

== Cast ==
- Karel Heřmánek as Leo Popper, father
- Marta Vančurová as Herma Popperová, mother
- Rudolf Hrušínský as Karel Prošek
- Jiří Krampol as Jenda Hejtmánek, boxer
- Lubor Tokoš as Nejezchleb, academic painter
- Dana Vlková as Irma Korálková
- Ladislav Potměšil as Korálek, Irma's husband and company director
- Oldřich Vlach as Studený, factory owner
- Zuzana Geislerová as Anička Studená, factory owner's wife
- Ladislav Trojan as Inspector
- Jan Přeučil as Inspector
- Marek Valter as Prdelka, Poppers' son (credited as Marek Walter)
- Jiří Strach as Jirka, Poppers' son
- Jan Jirásek as Hugo, Poppers' son
- Stanislav Zindulka as Josef Vejvoda, seller
- Zdeněk Dítě as Mayor
- Alois Švehlík as Spy
- Bronislav Poloczek as Franc, butcher
- Jana Synková as Gutová, secretary
- Milan Riehs as Jan Jakubíček, Doctor of Law
- Ivan Vyskočil as Gestapo officer

== See also ==
- List of submissions to the 60th Academy Awards for Best Foreign Language Film
- List of Czechoslovak submissions for the Academy Award for Best International Feature Film
