= Alena Vostrá =

- Born: 17 May 1938; Prague, Czechoslovakia
- Died: 15 April 1992 (aged 53); Prague, Czechoslovakia
- Education: Czech Technical University in Prague
- Spouse: Jaroslav Vostrý
- Writing career
- Genres: Fiction, fairy tale

Alena Vostrá (17 May 1938 – 15 April 1992) was a Czech novelist. One of her most popular works was A Matter of Days.

She was born as Rozená Obdržálková in Prague and in 1956, after graduating from the high school, studied engineering at Czech Technical University in Prague for two semesters, then stopped and started her studies at the Theatre Faculty of the Academy of Performing Arts in Prague (DAMU). In 1960, she was expelled for "individualism", but she was eventually allowed to continue with her studies. In 1962, she started to specialize in dramaturgy. In 1963, she married the author Jaroslav Vostrý. Vostrá started to publish in 1963 and won a state prize for her first book aimed at adults, Bůh z reklamy. She graduated in 1966.

Alena Vostrá wrote mainly theater pieces and screenplays, as well as fiction and fairy tales for children. In the theater pieces, her characters often encounter the grotesque reality of life. In prose, she often underlines connections between seemingly unimportant things.

== Bibliography ==
=== Novels ===
- Vodní bubláček Tarabka
- Kdo nevěří, ať tam jede
- Co dělá vítr, když nefouká
- Pepibubu
- Kouzelný oblázek
- U nás ve Švandaluzii
- Bůh z reklamy transl. "The god from the advert" (1964)
- Vlažná vlna transl. "Cool wave" (1966)
- Všema čtyřma očima transl. "With all four eyes" (1982)
- Než dojde k vraždě transl. "Before someone gets murdered" (1985)
- Výbuch bude v šest transl. "The explosion will be at six" (1985)
- Tanec na ledě transl. "Dance on ice" (1988)
- Médium (1991)
- Benedikt Sluhou Barona Prasila transl. "Benedict the servant of Baron Münchhausen" (1997, posthumous)

=== Plays ===
- Na koho to slovo padne transl. "Eeny meeny miney mo" (1967)
- Na ostří nože transl. "On a knife-edge" (1968)
