= Lupič Legenda =

1972 film

- Directed by: Karel Steklý
- Starring: Eduard Cupák
- Cinematography: Frantisek Uldrich
- Edited by: Jan Kohout
- Release date: 1972
- Running time: 91 minutes
- Country: Czechoslovakia
- Language: Czech

Lupič Legenda is a 1972 Czechoslovak drama film directed by Karel Steklý.

== Cast ==
- Eduard Cupák
- Vladimír Menšík
- Bohuslav Čáp
- Eliška Balzerová
- Jan Kúkol
- Jiří Holý
- Consuela Morávková
- Vladimír Brabec
- Martin Růžek
- Josef Beyvl
- Josef Větrovec
- Jaroslav Satoranský
