= Ladislav Fialka =

Czech mime (1931–1991)

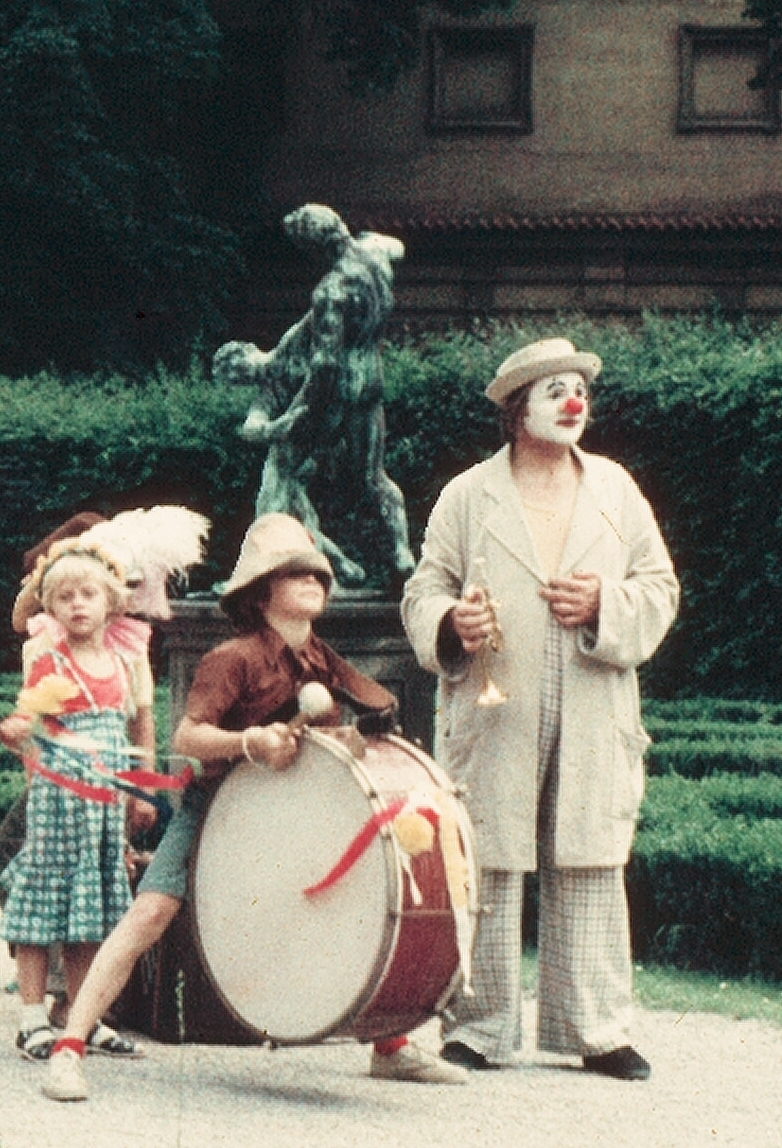
Fialka around 1983

Ladislav Fialka (22 August 1931 – 22 February 1991) was a Czech mime.

== Life ==
Fialka was born on 22 August 1931 in Prague. In 1956, he founded a theatre. Helena Philipová, Ivan Vyskočil, Jiří Suchý and Vladimír Vodička also contributed to the theatre organization. By 1958, Theatre on the Balustrade was born from this, the only independent pantomime theatre in Eastern Europe, and then Theatre on the Balustrade became one of the outstanding workshops of modern Czech theatre. In 1968, he was also able to present the works of Václav Havel (Garden Festival, Leirat). Successful performances were the adaptation of Franz Kafka's The Trial of King Ubu and Miloš Macourek's play Zsuzsanna. From 1962, the previously banned Jan Grosmann became the director of the theatre. Fialka became a significant, world-famous figure in pantomime art with his unique style and acting skills. His famous plays are Etudes, The Nose (Gogol), Dreams. He traveled the whole world with his company. He also performed with his theatre in Budapest in 1981. He died in Prague on 22 February 1991.
