= Jitka Zelenohorská =

Czech actress (born 1946)

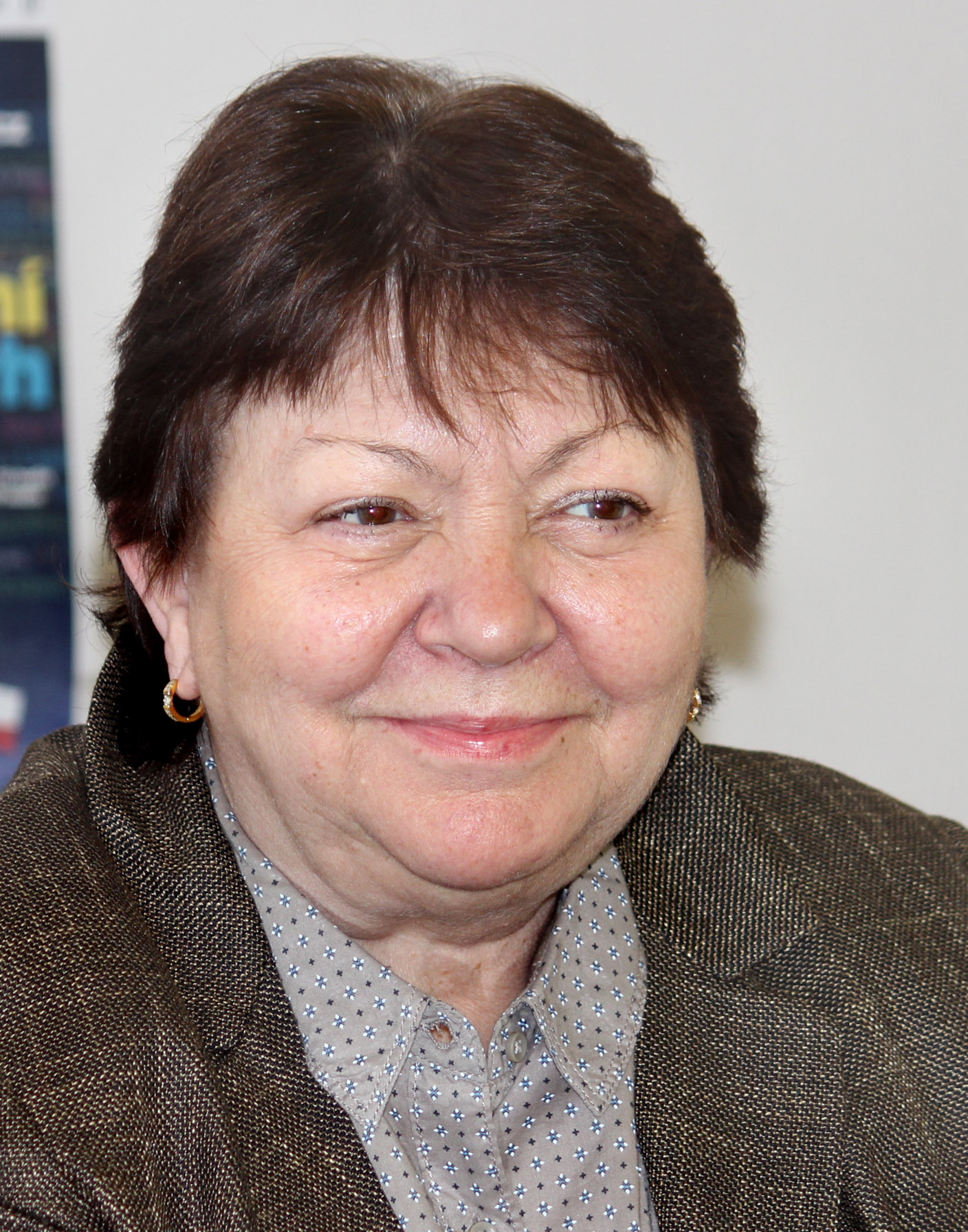
- Jitka Zelenohorská, 2016
- Born: 11 November 1946; Prague, Czechoslovakia
- Occupation: Actress
- Years active: 1961–1985

Jitka Zelenohorská (born 11 November 1946, in Prague) is a Czech actress. She performed in more than seventy films from 1961 to 1990. In the 1960s, she lived with the singer Waldemar Matuška.

== Selected filmography ==
Film
Year	Title	Role	Notes
1990	Larks on a String		Although the movie was released in 1990, it was shot in 1969.
1977	Tomorrow I'll Wake Up and Scald Myself with Tea		
1973	Lovers in the Year One		
1967	The Stolen Airship		
1966	Closely Watched Trains		

TV
Year	Title	Role	Notes
1979	Arabela		
