= Kvíčovice =

- Municipality
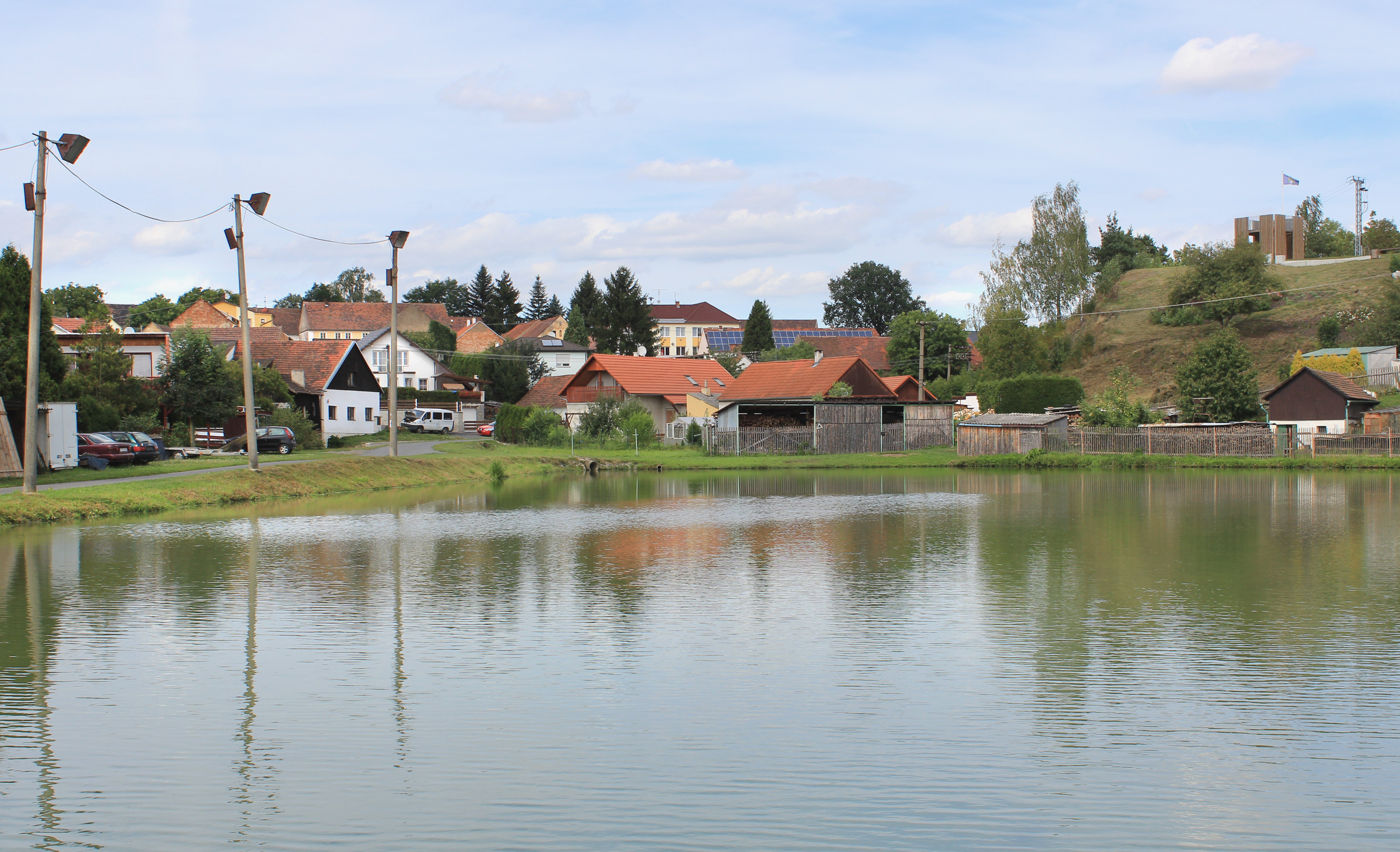
- Návesní rybník

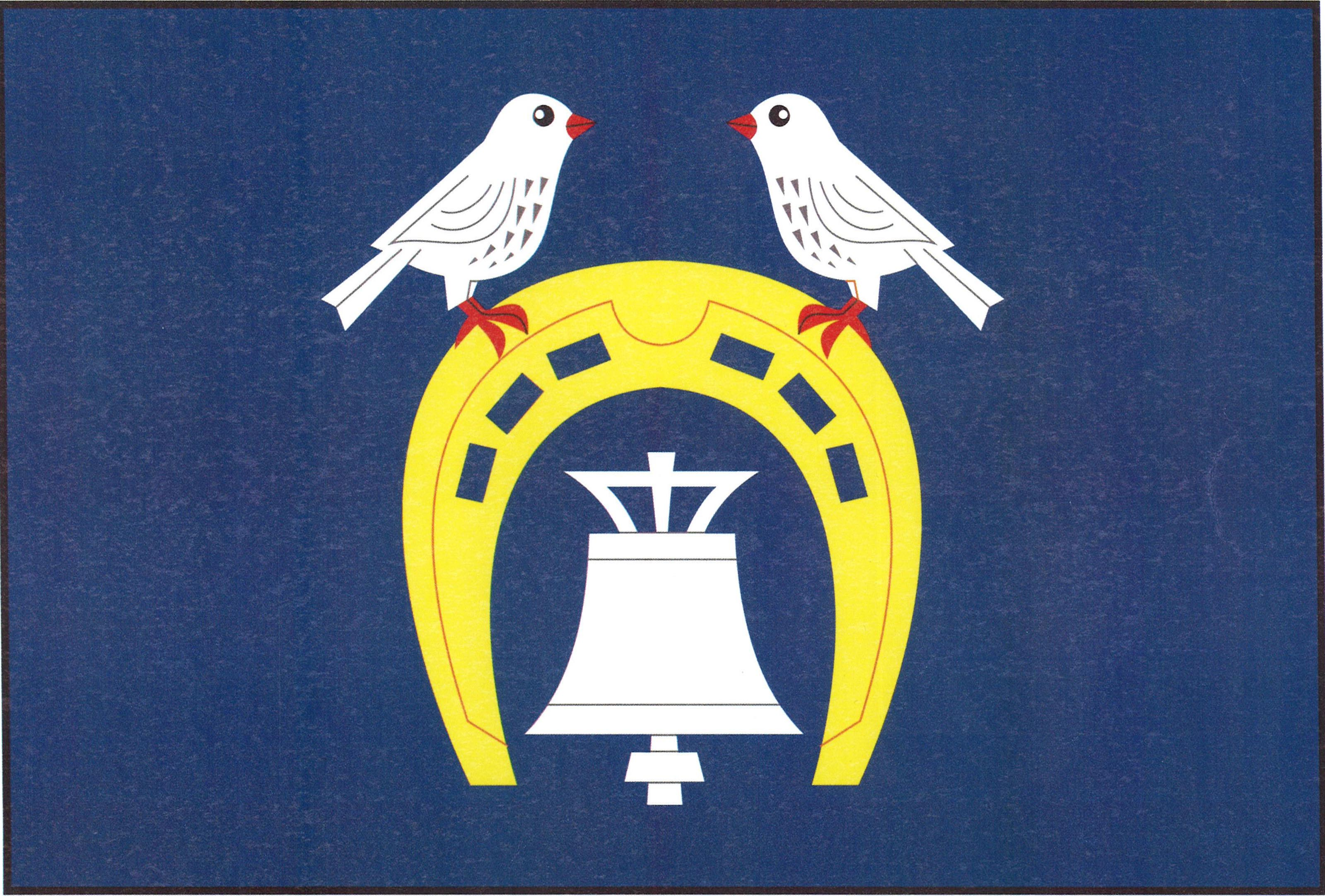
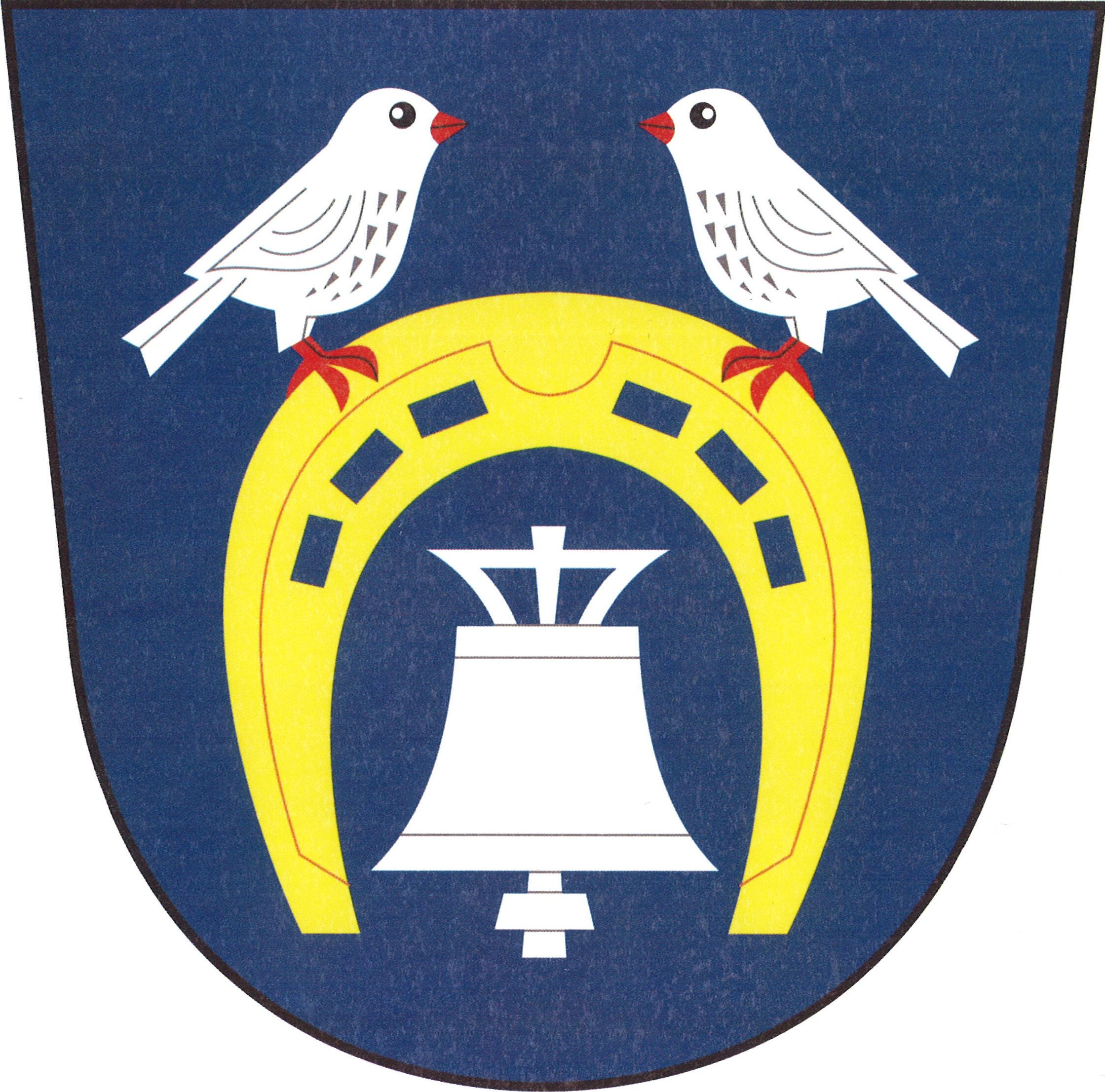
- Flag Coat of arms

- Location in the Czech Republic
- Coordinates: 49°35′25″N 13°4′23″E
- Country: Czech Republic
- Region: Plzeň
- District: Plzeň-South
- First mentioned: 1379

Area
  - Total: 3.94 km^{2} (1.52 sq mi)
- Elevation: 378 m (1,240 ft)

Population (2026-01-01)
  - Total: 440
  - Density: 110/km^{2} (290/sq mi)
- Time zone: UTC+1 (CET)
  - Summer (DST): UTC+2 (CEST)
- Postal code: 345 62
- Website: www.kvicovice.cz

Kvíčovice is a municipality and village in Plzeň-South District in the Plzeň Region of the Czech Republic. It has about 400 inhabitants.

== Etymology ==
The original name of the village was Květišovice. It was derived from the personal name Květiš, meaning "the village of Květiš's people". The name was distorted to Kvietšovice and then to Kvíčovice.

== Geography ==
Kvíčovice is located about 27 kilometres (17 mi) southwest of Plzeň. It lies in the Plasy Uplands. The Chuchla Stream flows through the municipality and connects with the Radbuza River on the eastern municipal border. In the centre of the village is a fishpond called Návesní rybník.

== History ==
The first written mention of Kvíčovice is from 1379, when it was owned by local noble family. In the 15th century, the village was joined to the Příchovice estate and later it belonged to the Čečovice estate. In 1546, the Čečovice estate with Kvíčovice was annexed to the Horšovský Týn estate. It remained so until the establishment of an independent municipality in 1850.

From 1 January 2021, Kvíčovice is no longer a part of Domažlice District and belongs to Plzeň-South District.

== Demographics ==
Historical population

Year	Pop.	±%
1869	293	—
1880	324	+10.6%
1890	335	+3.4%
1900	362	+8.1%
1910	472	+30.4%

Year	Pop.	±%
1921	521	+10.4%
1930	540	+3.6%
1950	414	−23.3%
1961	412	−0.5%
1970	376	−8.7%

Year	Pop.	±%
1980	356	−5.3%
1991	368	+3.4%
2001	335	−9.0%
2011	357	+6.6%
2021	425	+19.0%

Source: Censuses

== Transport ==
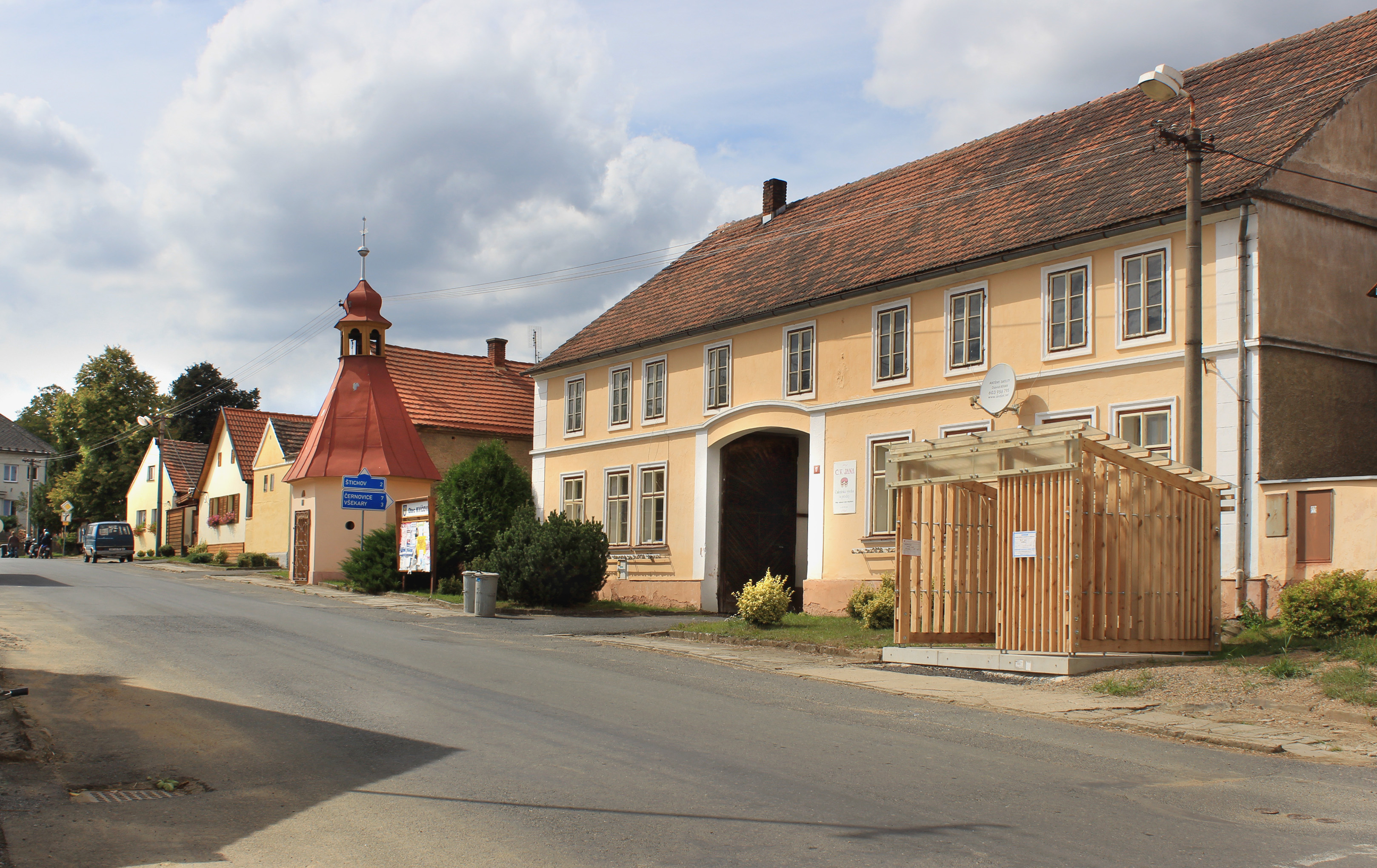
Main street

The I/26 road (from Plzeň to the Czech–German border in Česká Kubice) runs through the municipality.

== Sights ==
The only protected cultural monument in the municipality is a small Baroque chapel, which was probably built in the 18th century.

== Notable people ==
- Štěpánka Haničincová (1931–1999), actress, screenwriter and television presenter
