= Miroslav Moravec =

Czech actor

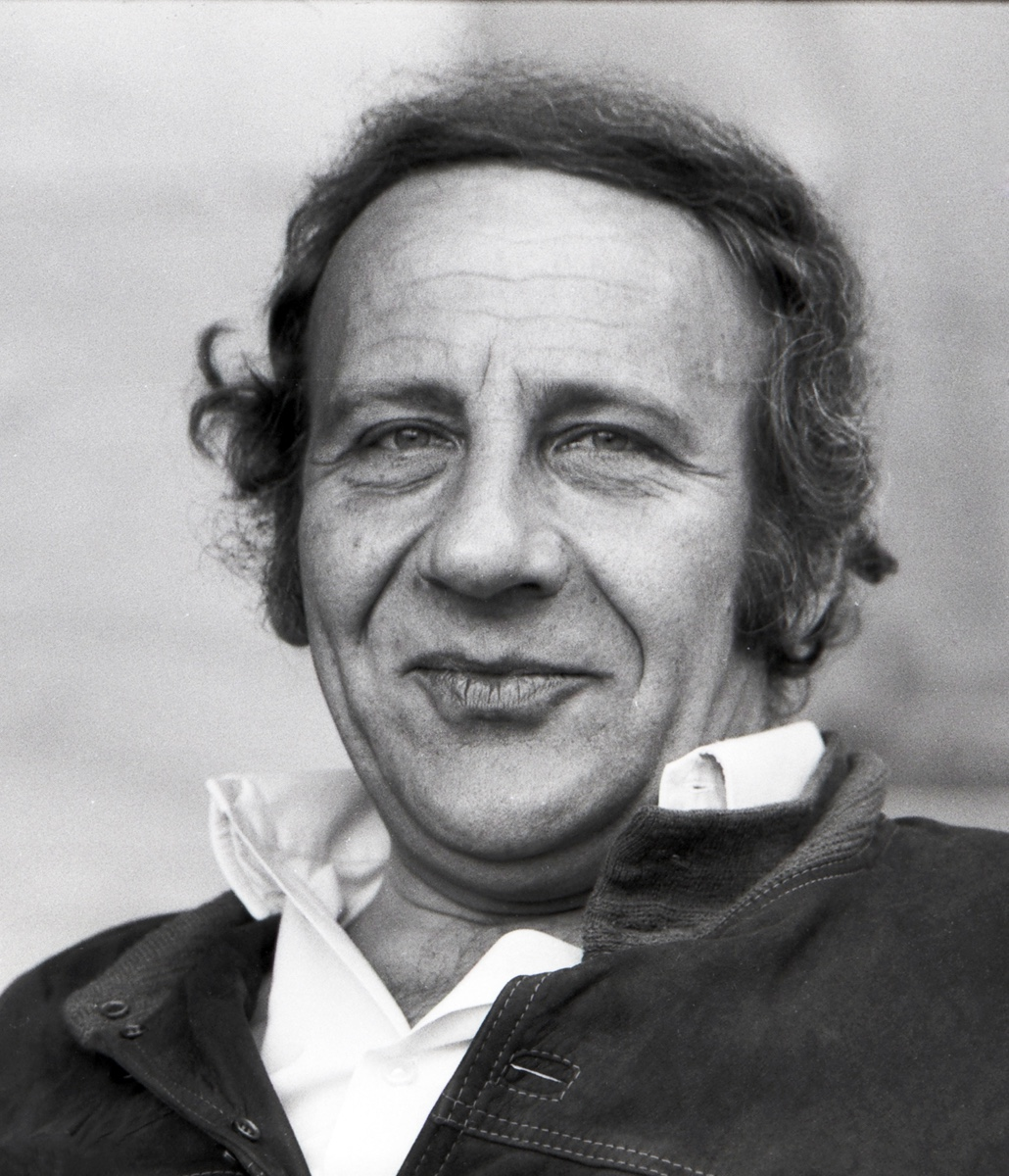
- Born: 6 January 1939; Prague, Second Czechoslovak Republic
- Died: 29 March 2009 (aged 70); Prague, Czech Republic
- Occupation: Actor

Miroslav Moravec (6 January 1939, in Prague – 29 March 2009, in Prague) was a Czech actor. He starred in the 1982 film Poslední propadne peklu, directed by Ludvík Ráža.

Moravec voiced Junior in the Czech dub of Home on the Range (2004).

== Selected filmography ==
- One Silver Piece (1976)
- Poslední propadne peklu (1982)
- Byl jednou jeden polda (1995)
