= Bratronice (Kladno District) =

- Municipality
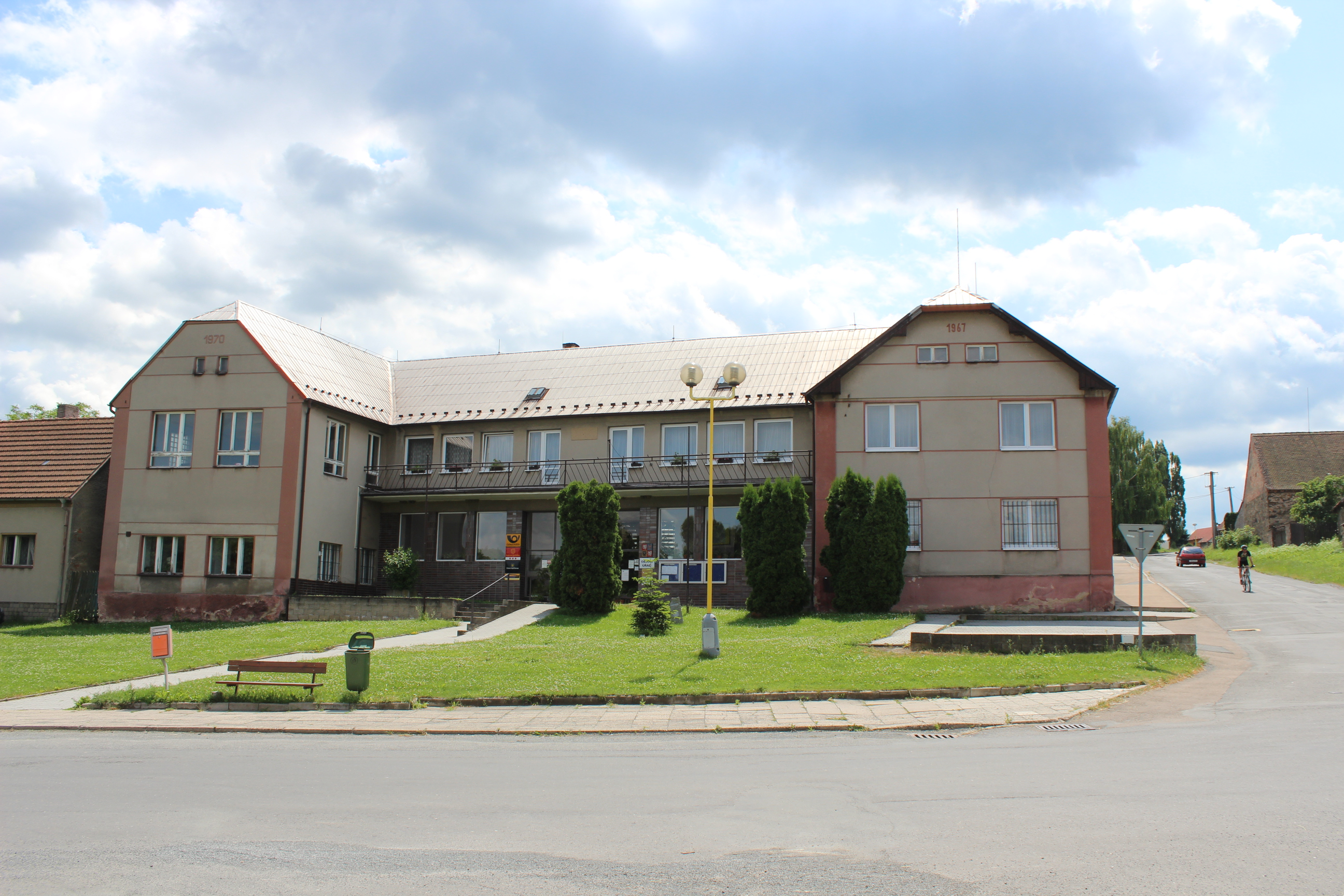
- Municipal office

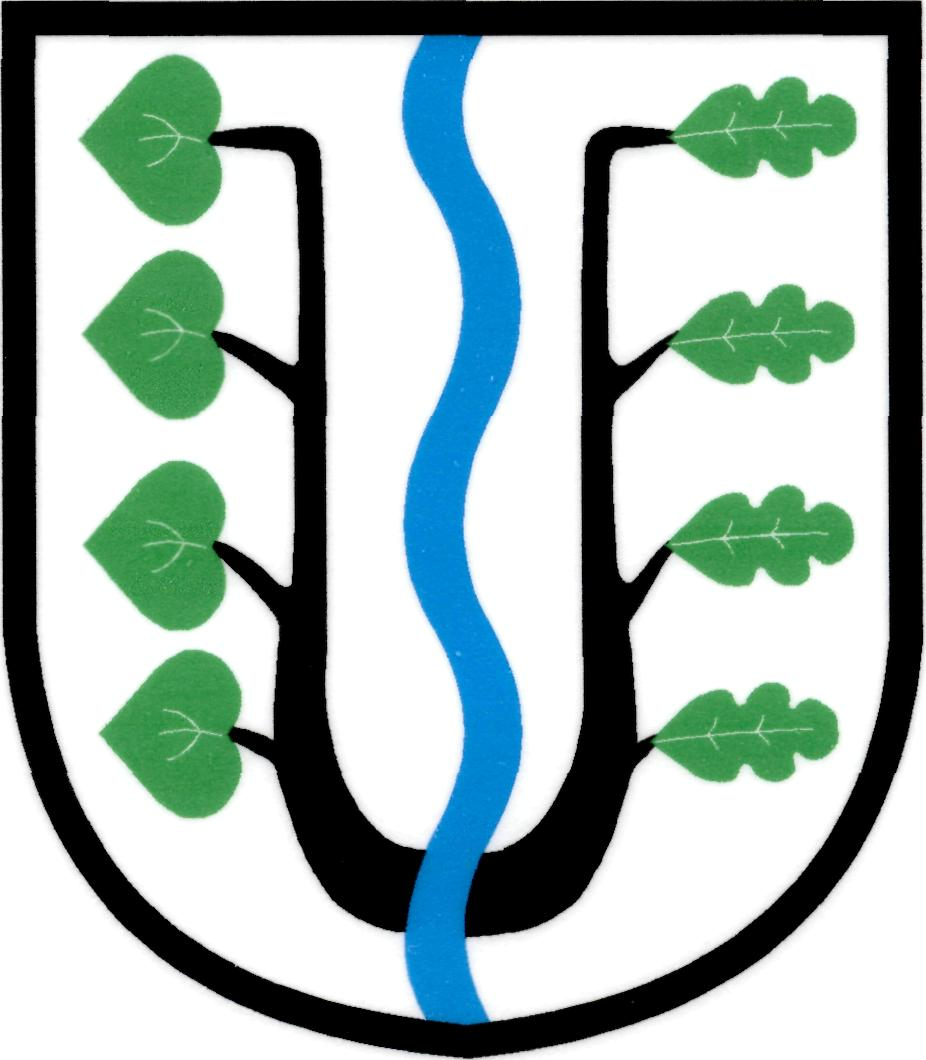
- Flag Coat of arms

- Location in the Czech Republic
- Coordinates: 50°4′4″N 14°0′51″E
- Country: Czech Republic
- Region: Central Bohemian
- District: Kladno
- First mentioned: 1227

Area
  - Total: 15.63 km^{2} (6.03 sq mi)
- Elevation: 410 m (1,350 ft)

Population (2026-01-01)
  - Total: 1,006
  - Density: 64.36/km^{2} (166.7/sq mi)
- Time zone: UTC+1 (CET)
  - Summer (DST): UTC+2 (CEST)
- Postal code: 273 62, 273 63
- Website: www.bratronice.cz

Bratronice is a municipality and village in Kladno District in the Central Bohemian Region of the Czech Republic. It has about 1,000 inhabitants.

== Administrative division ==
Bratronice consists of two municipal parts (in brackets population according to the 2021 census):

- Bratronice (829)
- Dolní Bezděkov (129)

== Etymology ==
The name is derived from the personal name Bratroň, meaning "the village of Bratroň's people".

== Geography ==
Bratronice is located about 10 kilometres (6 mi) southwest of Kladno and 21 km (13 mi) west of Prague. It lies in the Křivoklát Highlands. The highest point is the hill Kouty at 473 m (1,552 ft) above sea level. The Loděnice River flows through the municipality. The southern part of the municipal territory lies in the Křivoklátsko Protected Landscape Area.

== History ==
The first written mention of Bratronice is from 1228, when it was owned by the St. George's Convent in Prague. The village was then alternately part of the estates of Křivoklát and Okoř and shared their owners.

== Demographics ==
Historical population

Year	Pop.	±%
1869	1,013	—
1880	1,132	+11.7%
1890	1,005	−11.2%
1900	1,017	+1.2%
1910	1,000	−1.7%

Year	Pop.	±%
1921	991	−0.9%
1930	1,043	+5.2%
1950	858	−17.7%
1961	874	+1.9%
1970	812	−7.1%

Year	Pop.	±%
1980	759	−6.5%
1991	716	−5.7%
2001	765	+6.8%
2011	875	+14.4%
2021	958	+9.5%

Source: Censuses

== Transport ==
There are no railways or major roads passing through the municipality.

== Sights ==
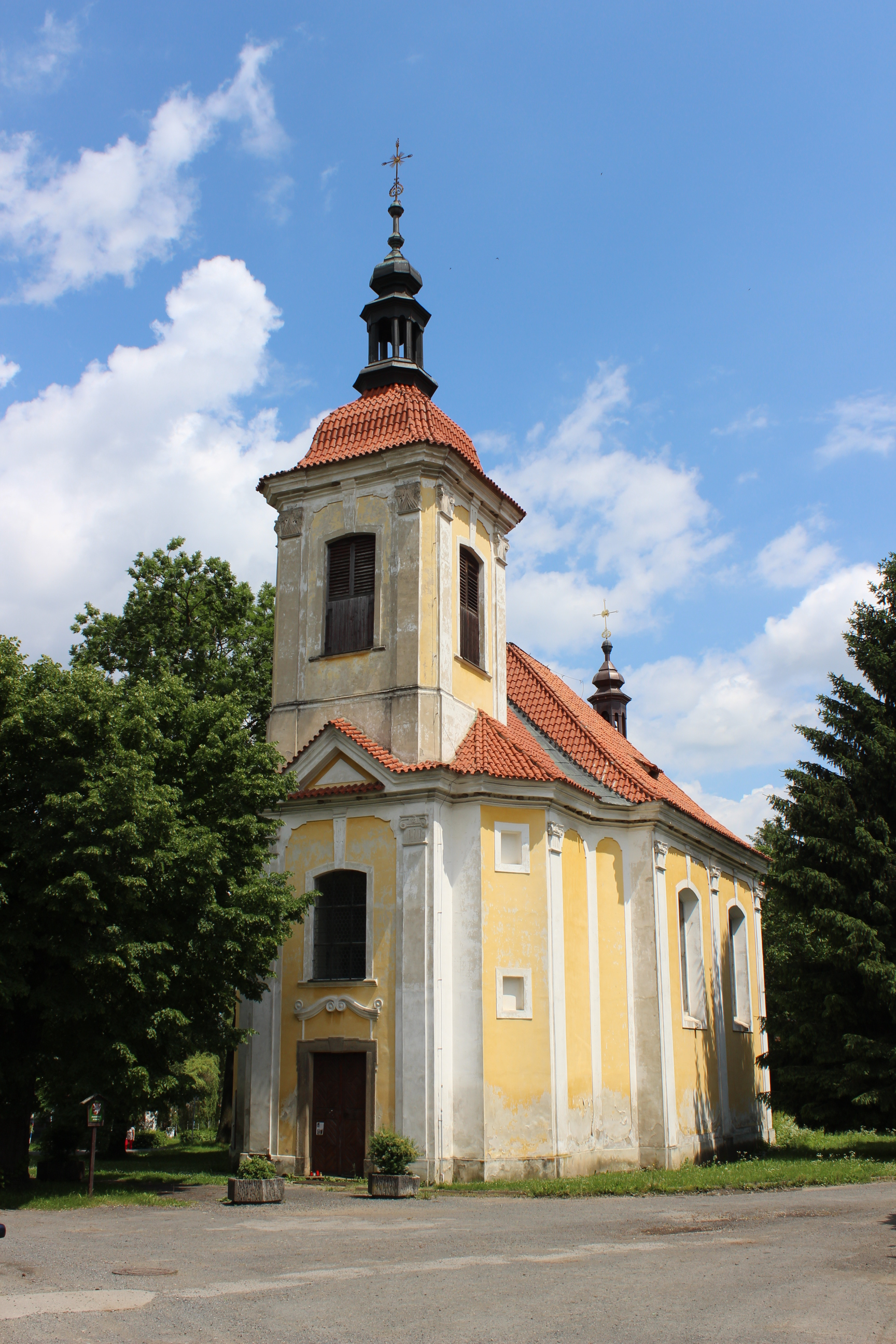
Church of All Saints

The main landmark of Bratronice is the Church of All Saints. It was built in the late Baroque style in 1780–1783.

== Notable people ==
- Petr Haničinec (1930–2007), actor; died here
