= Zuzana Geislerová =

Czech actress

- Born: 14 March 1952 (age 74); Prague, Czechoslovakia
- Occupation: Actress
- Years active: 1973–present

Zuzana Geislerová (born 14 March 1952) is a Czech actress known to United States audiences for her role as the Reverend Mother Gaius Helen Mohiam in the Sci Fi Channel's 2000 miniseries Frank Herbert's Dune and its 2003 sequel, Frank Herbert's Children of Dune.

Geislerová studied at the Theatre Faculty of the Academy of Performing Arts in Prague. She is the daughter of Růžena Lysenková, and the aunt of Lenka, Anna and Ester. She has a son, Adam, from her first marriage to Pavel Soukup.

== Filmography ==
- 2010 Cukrárna
- 2007 Hostel II
- 2005 3 plus 1 s Miroslavem Donutilem
- 2003 Děti planety Duna
- 2000 Duna
- 1997 Pokořitelé Tróje
- 1997 Výchova dívek v Čechách
- 1993 Svatba upírů
- 1992 Hříchy pro pátera Knoxe
- 1990 Největší z Pierotů
- 1989 Dobrodružství kriminalistiky
- 1989 Volná noha
- 1988 Křivda
- 1987 Kam, pánové, kam jdete?
- 1986 Smrt krásných srnců
- 1984 Jak se rozloučit s Odettkou
- 1984 Sanitka
- 1982 Šílený kankán
- 1979 Drsná Planina
- 1975 Profesoři za školou
- 1974 Píšťalka pro dva
- 1974 V každém pokoji žena
- 1973 Milenci v roce jedna
