= Luděk Sobota =

Czech actor (born 1943)

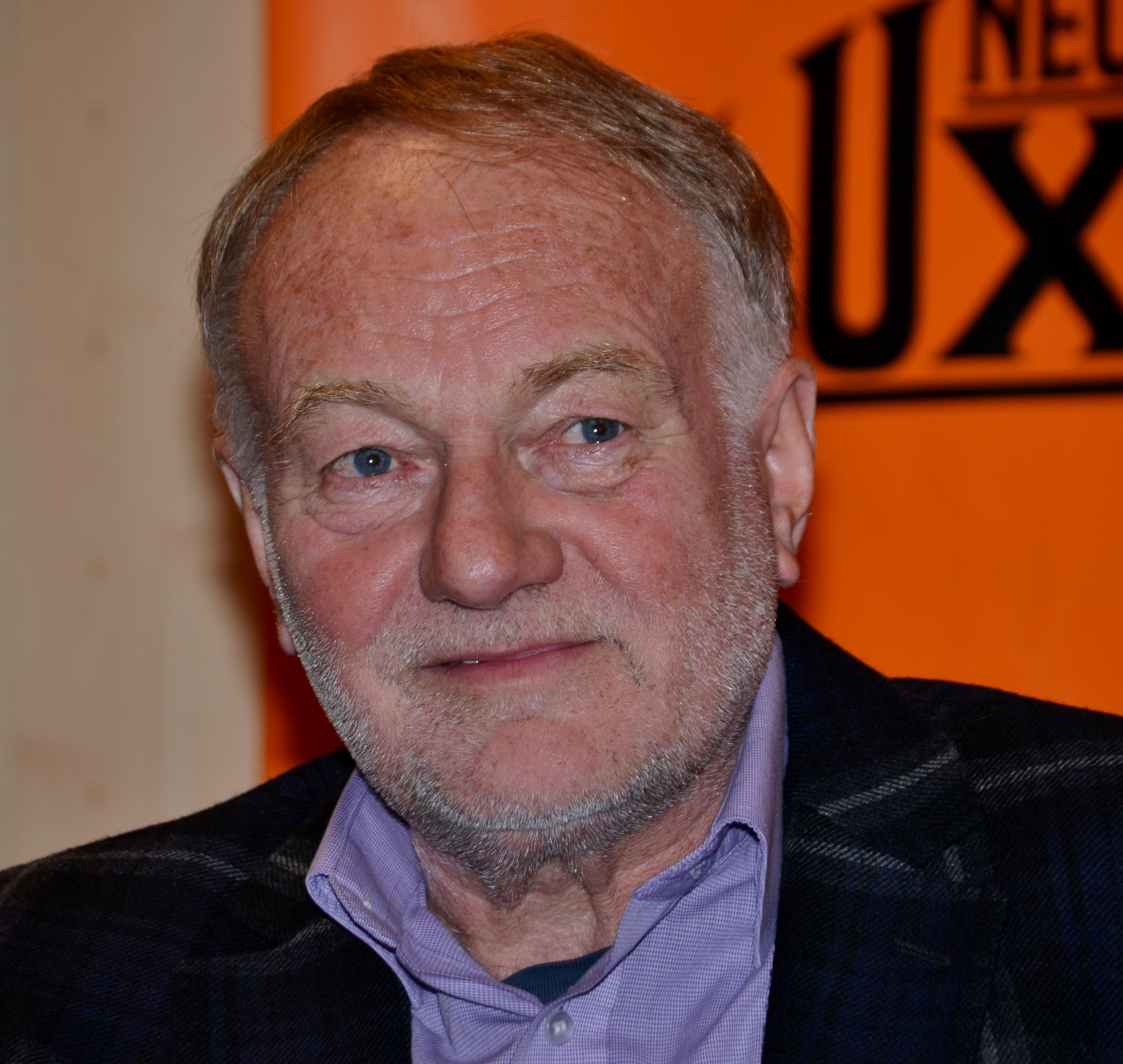
- Sobota in 2013
- Born: 27 May 1943 (age 83); Prague, Protectorate of Bohemia and Moravia
- Education: DAMU
- Occupations: Comedian; actor
- Years active: 1968–present
- Website: ludeksobota.cz

Signature
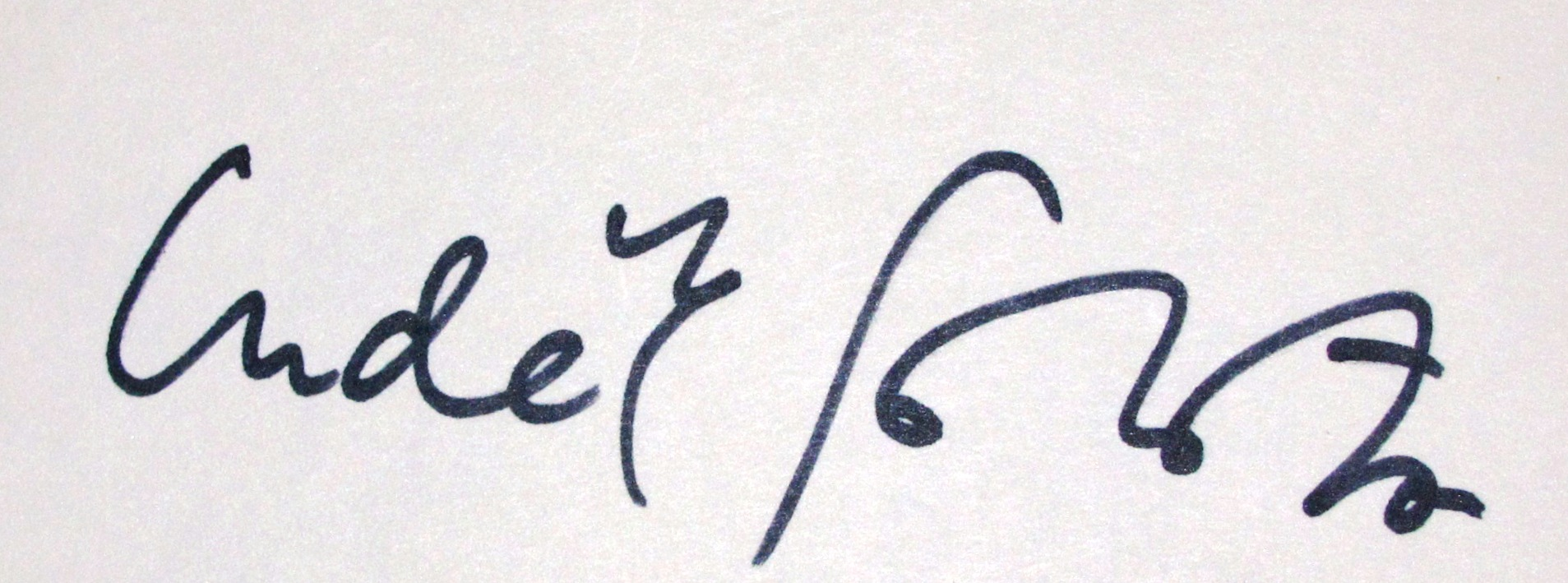

Luděk Sobota (born 27 May 1943) is a Czech stand-up comedian and actor. He studied at Faculty of Theatre. He had his own theatre in Prague, Divadlo Ludka Soboty (Theatre of Luděk Sobota), which was located near the metro station I. P. Pavlova. He was in a comedy trio with Petr Nárožný and Miloslav Šimek. He is also known for providing voice-acting for the protagonist in the Polda video game series.

== Filmography ==
- 1974 – Jáchyme, hoď ho do stroje!
- 1980 – Blázni, vodníci a podvodníci as Karel
- 1982 – Srdečný pozdrav ze zeměkoule
- 1986 – The Great Cheese Robbery, feature-lingth animated film
- 2012 – Sunday League – Pepik Hnatek's Final Match

== Theatre performances ==
- 2006 Ze Soboty "znovu" na Šimka
- 2006 Facky místo pohádek
- 2006 Směšná šou Luďka Soboty
- 2005 Kouzlo vánoc
- 2005 Dokonalý večer Krampola a hostů
- 2004 Duševní hyena
- 2001 Šlamastyky Luďka Soboty
- 1995 Sobota není z Skamene
- 1990 Muž v dívčí škole
- 1985 Sobota, kanál číslo 1
- 1982 Náměsíčná sonáta
- 1980 Návštěvní den č.7
- 1978 Celaskon a Cyankali (Hádanky na lavičce)
- 1977 Dva pestré týdny v oblastním muzeu
- 1976 Robinson Kreutznauer potom a Šípková Růženka napřed
- 1975 Návštěvní den č.6
- 1973 Jemný mrav
- 1973 Třetí nejlepší představení na světě aneb Zázrak
