= Vladimír Brabec =

Czech actor

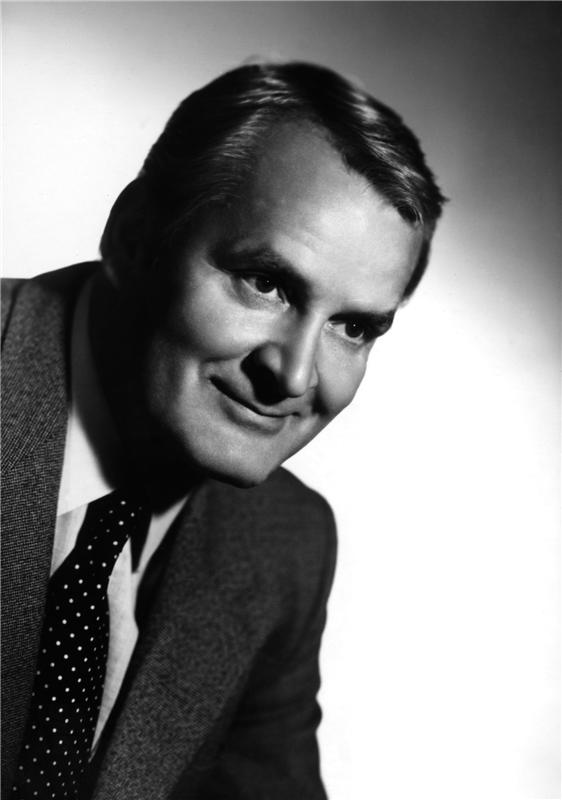
- Born: May 15, 1934; Prague, Czechoslovakia
- Died: September 1, 2017 (aged 83); Nová Ves pod Pleší, Czech Republic
- Occupation: Actor
- Years active: 1948-2016

Vladimír Brabec (15 May 1934 in Prague – 1 September 2017 in Nová Ves pod Pleší) was a Czech actor.

== Selected filmography ==
- Revolucni rok 1848 (1949) - Student
- Krízová trojka (1952) - Boy
- Velké dobrodruzství (1952) - Cervenka
- Návsteva z oblak (1955) - Parachutist - operator
- Ztracená stopa (1956)
- September Nights (1957)
- Malí medvedári (1957) - Vychovatel detského domova
- Váhavý strelec (1957)
- Cerný prapor (1958)
- Desire (1958)
- Zivot pro Jana Kaspara (1959) - MUDr. Lipský
- Probuzení (1960)
- Pochodne (1961) - delnický predák Ladislav Zápotocký
- Nocni host (1961) - starsina SNB Vitek Hrabal
- Praha nultá hodina (1963) - MUDr. Fahoun
- Prosim nebudit! (1963) - Sylaba
- Poslední ruze od Casanovy (1966) - Frantisek Adam Valdstejn
- The Shield and the Sword (1968, TV Mini-Series) - Jaromir Drobnij
- Kapitan Korda (1970) - Korda
- Svatby pana Voka (1971) - cisaruv kanclér Slavata
- Lekce (1972) - Rohde
- Tajemství velikeho vypravece (1972)
- Slecna Golem (1972) - Robot at exhibition (voice, uncredited)
- Lupič Legenda (1973) - policejní komisar Eminger
- Maturita za skolou (1973)
- Adam a Otka (1974) - Vladimír Suk
- Vysoká modrá zed (1974) - Mjr. Pilar
- V kazdém pokoji zena (1974) - Zbynek Bezdek
- Thirty Cases of Major Zeman (1976-1980, TV Series) - Maj. Jan Zeman / Richard Lipinski
- Osvobození Prahy (1977) - Hlasatel
- Náš dědek Josef (1977) - Lovec
- Pasiáns (1977) - Karel
- Nekonecná nevystupovat (1979)
- Stíhán a podezrelý (1979) - Dr. Hein
- Rukojmí v Bella Vista (1980) - Mjr. Jan Zeman
- Citova výchova jednej Dáse (1980) - Puco Baric
- Návštěvníci (1983, TV Series) - Narrator (voice)
- Zachvev strachu (1984) - Publisher Sedlaczek
- Martha and I (1990)
- Stuj, nebo se netrefím (1998) - Halbhuber
- Z pekla stestí (1999) - King
- Z pekla stestí 2 (2001) - King
- Anglické jahody (2008) - Secret Policeman
- Pametnice (2009) - Prof. Viktor Verner
- Ctyrlístek ve sluzbách krále (2013) - Sendivoj (voice)
- Příběh kmotra (2013) - JUDr. Tipl
- Tajemství pouze sluzební (2016) - Doctor (final film role)
