= Miloslav Šimek =

Czech comedian (1940–2004)

- Miloslav Šimek in c. 1970
- Born: 7 March 1940; Prague, Protectorate of Bohemia and Moravia
- Died: 16 February 2004 (aged 63); Prague, Czech Republic
- Occupations: Comedian, satirist
- Years active: 1961–2003

Miloslav Šimek (7 March 1940 – 16 February 2004) was a Czech comedian and satirist. He was most famous for his double act with Jiří Grossmann on their show Návštěvní den at the Semafor, presented in 1968–1971. Later he cooperated with Luděk Sobota, Petr Nárožný, Jiří Krampol, and finally Zuzana Bubílková.

== Biography ==
Miloslav Šimek was born on 7 March 1940 in Prague. His father was a poet and bank clerk. After graduating from high school in 1957, he worked as a warehouseman and accountant because he was not accepted to law school for political reasons. In 1959–1963, he studied at the Pedagogical Institute teaching of Czech language, history and art education. In 1965–1967, he worked as a teacher.

In 1961, Šimek began collaborating with Jiří Grossmann, a lyricist, actor, writer and singer. Together they founded the Olympik Theatre Club, where they performed. Šimek also performed in several cabarets. From 1967, he and Grossmann were professionally employed in the Semafor theatre. The duo Šimek & Grossmann created several theatrical programs (called Návštěvní den, i.e. 'visiting day', and numbered 1–6) in 1968–1971, which consisted of comic dialogues and skits, interspersed with songs by popular performers from the Semafor theatre and readings of short absurd-humorous stories that Šimek and Grossmann wrote together. Due to the popularity, the theatrical performances were filmed and broadcast on television, and their audio recordings were sold. Their performances also included political satire, but after the end of the Prague Spring in 1968, they had to move from straightforward satire to innuendo, double entendres and apolitical humor.

Grossmann died young in December 1971. Šimek initially performed alone in Semafor, but then began collaborating with actor Luděk Sobota. They performed together from 1972 to 1982 (and until 1978 Petr Nárožný also performed with them). However, the intelligent humor of the previous duo was replaced by simpler humor. His following theatre partners were Jiří Krampol and Uršula Kluková, but the performance was not a success.

In 1990, Šimek left Semafor and founded the Jiří Grossmann Theatre (today known as Palace Theatre). He returned to political satire, first on radio and then on television. From 1995 to 2003, he formed a duo with Zuzana Bubílková, a former television presenter. Together, they created a TV show (S politiky netančím – "I don't dance with politicians", later renamed Politické harašení – "Political harassment") focused on political satire and social problems, which was among the most watched Czech TV shows of its time. However, Šimek then fell ill with acute leukemia. He died in Prague on 16 February 2004.

Šimek was married and had three daughters: Eva, Magdalena and Hana. He was an active sportsman, was a member of the Scout Movement, did not smoke and drink alcohol, and enjoyed nature trips.

== Work ==
Miroslav Šimek is the author of books, which contain a selection of the best from performances with each of his partners, including Návštěvní dny (1975), Tři mušketýři and Jak vyrobit bumerang (both with Luděk Sobota in 1987) and six books with satirical texts written with Zuzana Bubílková (1997–2001). Collections of short stories he wrote have also been published, including Besídka zvláštní školy (1969), Besídka bývalých žáků zvláštní školy (1990), Povídky aneb nechci slevu zadarmo (1993) and Povídky (published in memoriam; 2008).

Šimek appeared in several films as an actor:

- Případ mrtvého muže (1974)
- Jen ho nechte, ať se bojí (1977)
- Hop – a je tu lidoop (1977)
- Buldoci a třešně (1981)
- Kam doskáče ranní ptáče (1987)
