= Jiří Grossmann =

Czech actor, poet and composer

- Grossmann during the Návštěvní den theatre performance
- Born: 20 July 1941; Prague, Protectorate of Bohemia and Moravia
- Died: 5 December 1971 (aged 30); Prague, Czechoslovakia

Jiří Grossmann (20 July 1941 – 5 December 1971) was a Czech theatre actor, poet and composer.

== Life ==
Jiří Grossmann with Miloslav Šimek in Návštěvní den

Grossmann was born in Prague. After his graduation, he started at the Czech Technical University in Prague, but left in 1962 when he met Miloslav Šimek in the Olympik bar. Grossmann performed with Dixie Party Band in the Olympik Theatre Club, playing on contrabass also. They immediately established a theatre double and started writing poems, short stories and stage plays. Their first theatre group was called Mlok. Grossmann and Šimek's most famous project was Navštěvní den, a theatre-styled show performed in theatre Semafor.

The duo was persecuted after the Soviet occupation of Czechoslovakia in 1968 following the Prague Spring.

When Grossmann realized he was dying of Hodgkin lymphoma, he wrote one of his most sad lyrics called Závidím (I am envious) expressing fears of death. On 5 December 1971, Grossmann died in the hospital.

The Jiří Grossmann Theatre and Prague's Jiří Grossmann's Archway commemorate him today.

== Books ==
Jiří Grossmann and Miroslav Šimek wrote together many short stories, which they read out as part of their performances. Their collections were also published as books, some only after Grossmann's death. The collections include:

- Besídka zvláštní školy (1969)
- Besídka bývalých žáků zvláštní školy (1990)
- Povídky aneb nechci slevu zadarmo (1993)
- Povídky (2008)

== Filmography ==
Year	Name	English Title	Movie/TV
1968	Zločin v šantánu	Crime in a Music Hall	Movie
1969	Návštěvní den Miloslava Šimka a Jiřího Grossmanna	Visiting Day of Miloslav Simek and Jiri Grossmann	TV
1969	Návštěvní den č. 2	Visiting Day No.2	TV
1969	Návštěvní den č. 3	Visiting Day No.3	TV
1969	Návštěvní den č. 4	Visiting Day No.4	not played
1970	Návštěvní den č. 5	Visiting Day No.5	TV
1970	Návštěvní den č. 6	Visiting Day No.6	TV

== Discography ==
Year	Name	English Title	Comment
1991	Své banjo odhazuji v dál	I Am Throwing My Banjo Away	published in memoriam
2002	Jako kotě si příst	Purr Like A Kitten	published in memoriam

== Related quotes ==
I don't believe that people who gave so much joy to so many people could die, as well as I don't believe that those who cannot give joy live...

— Miroslav Horníček
