= Martin Růžek =

Czech actor (1918–1995)

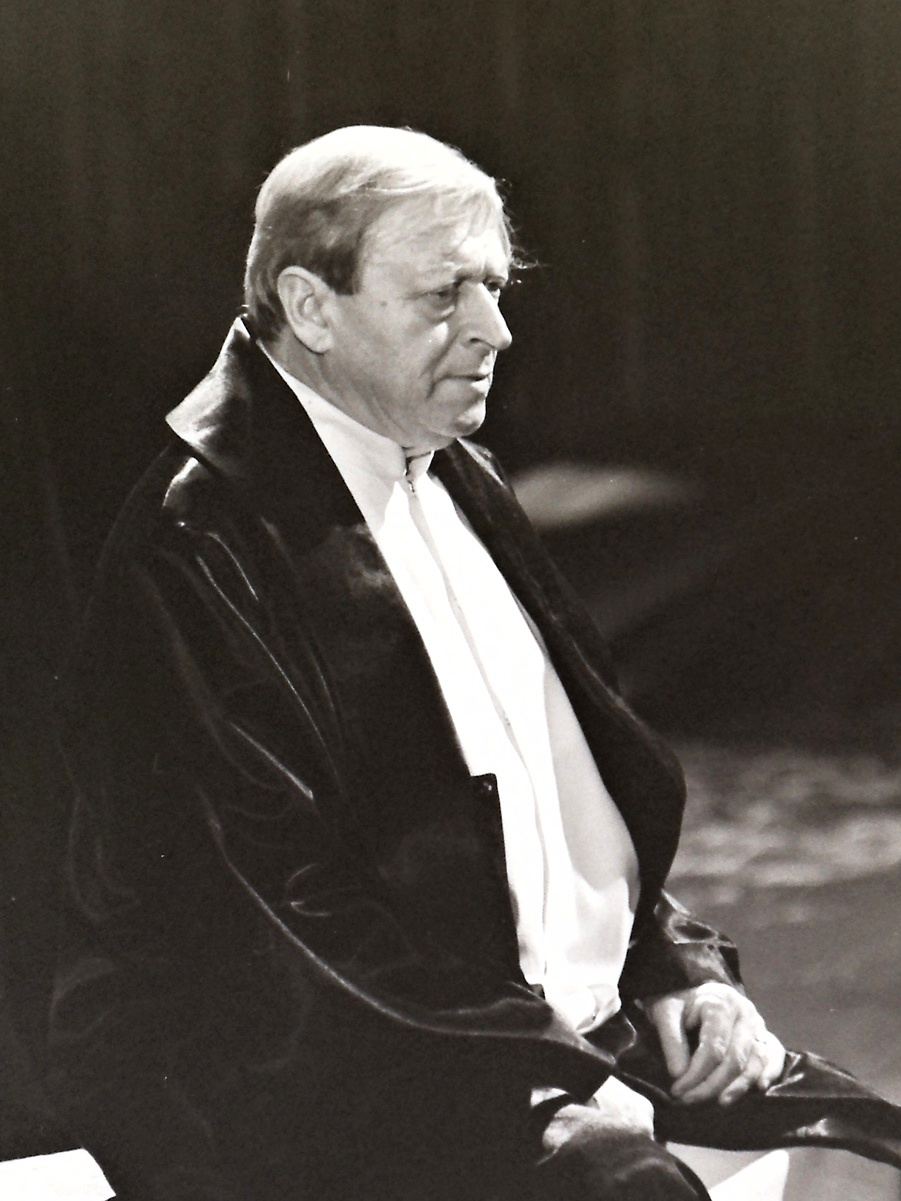
- Růžek as Lord Chief Justice in Henry IV, Part 2, National Theatre in Prague, 1988
- Born: Erhard Martin; 23 September 1918; Červený Kostelec, Austria-Hungary
- Died: 18 December 1995 (aged 77); Prague, Czech Republic
- Occupation: Actor
- Years active: 1950–1994

Signature
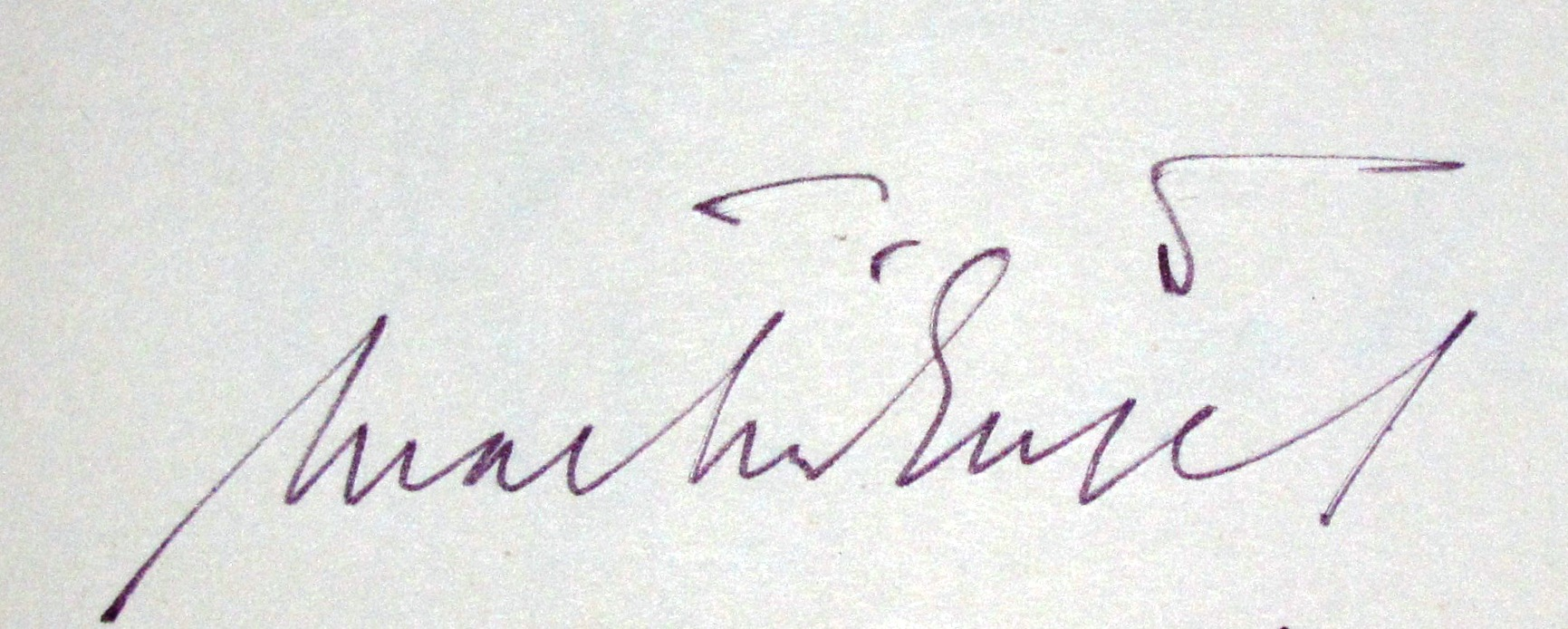

Martin Růžek, born Erhard Martin (23 September 1918 – 18 December 1995) was a Czech actor. He starred in the film Poslední propadne peklu under director Ludvík Ráža in 1982.

== Personal life ==
Růžek was born on 23 September 1918 in Červený Kostelec. He died on 18 December 1995 in Prague.

== Selected filmography ==
- Anna Proletářka (1950)
- Princezna se zlatou hvězdou (1959)
- The Night Guest (1961)
- Death is Called Engelchen (1963)
- Hvězda zvaná Pelyněk (1964)
- Happy End (1966)
- Lidé z maringotek (1966)
- Lupič Legenda (1972)
- Do Be Quick (1977)
- Poslední propadne peklu (1982)
