= Petr Nárožný =

Czech actor (born 1938)

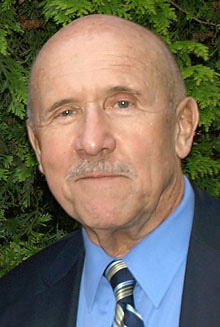
- Nárožný in 2009
- Born: 14 April 1938 (age 88); Prague, Czechoslovakia
- Education: Czech Technical University
- Occupations: Actor, TV presenter
- Years active: 1968–present

Petr Nárožný (born 14 April 1938) is a Czech actor, television presenter, comedian, and entertainer.

== Life and career ==
As a boy, Nárožný spent part of World War II in Germany, where he experienced Allied bombings. He graduated from the Faculty of Civil Engineering at the Czech Technical University in Prague in 1968. The year of his graduation, he began working as a moderator and entertainer at concerts for the band Rangers. From 1973, he was engaged as an actor at Semafor Theatre in Prague, forming a trio with Luděk Sobota and Miloslav Šimek. In 1980, he became a member of The Drama Club.

Since 1974, Nárožný has appeared in numerous films and television productions, starting with the comedy Jáchyme, hoď ho do stroje! and including the TV series Sanitka and Hospoda.

He lent his voice and likeness to the character Peter of Pisek in the 2025 video game Kingdom Come: Deliverance II.

=== Večerníček ===
Nárožný has narrated several series of the Večerníček children's television program, most notably Mach a Šebestová and Žofka a spol.

== Selected filmography ==
=== Film ===
List of film appearances, with year, title, and role shown
Year	Title	Role	Notes
1974	Jáchyme, hoď ho do stroje!	Car racer Stanislav Volejník	
1975	Páni kluci	Driver	
1976	Marecek, Pass Me the Pen!	Týfa	
1977	Což takhle dát si špenát	Cook Richard	
1977	Tomorrow I'll Wake Up and Scald Myself with Tea	Driver	
1978	Jak dostat tatínka do polepšovny	Mail carrier Fanda	
1985	Give the Devil His Due	Corporal	
1986	The Great Cheese Robbery	Rajmond	
1993	Svatba upírů	Uncle Archibald	
2008	Goat Story	Beggar	
2012	Líbáš jako ďábel	Psychiatrist	
2019	The Last Aristocrat	Buyer	

List of television appearances, with year, title, and role shown
Year	Title	Role	Notes
1977	Pan Tau	Father	2 episodes
1982–2005	Mach a Šebestová	Narrator	Numerous episodes
1984	Sanitka	Pudil	9 episodes
1986–1988	Žofka a spol.	Narrator	13 episodes
1988	Cirkus Humberto	Kostečka	2 episodes
1991	The Territory of White Deer	Announcer	7 episodes
1996–1997	Hospoda	Bartender Jaroslav Dušek	51 episodes
2010	Okresní přebor		1 episode

== Awards ==
- 2026 Thalia Award, Lifetime Achievement, Play
