= Petr Oliva =

Czech futsal player

Oliva
Personal information
- Full name: Petr Oliva
- Date of birth: 23 October 1987 (age 39)
- Place of birth: Czechoslovakia
- Position: Defender

Team information
- Current team: Slavia Prague

International career
Years	Team	Apps	(Gls)
- Czech Republic

Petr Oliva (born 23 October 1987), is a Czech futsal player who plays for Slavia Prague and the Czech Republic national futsal team.
