= Viktor Skála =

Czech stage and television actor (born 1968)

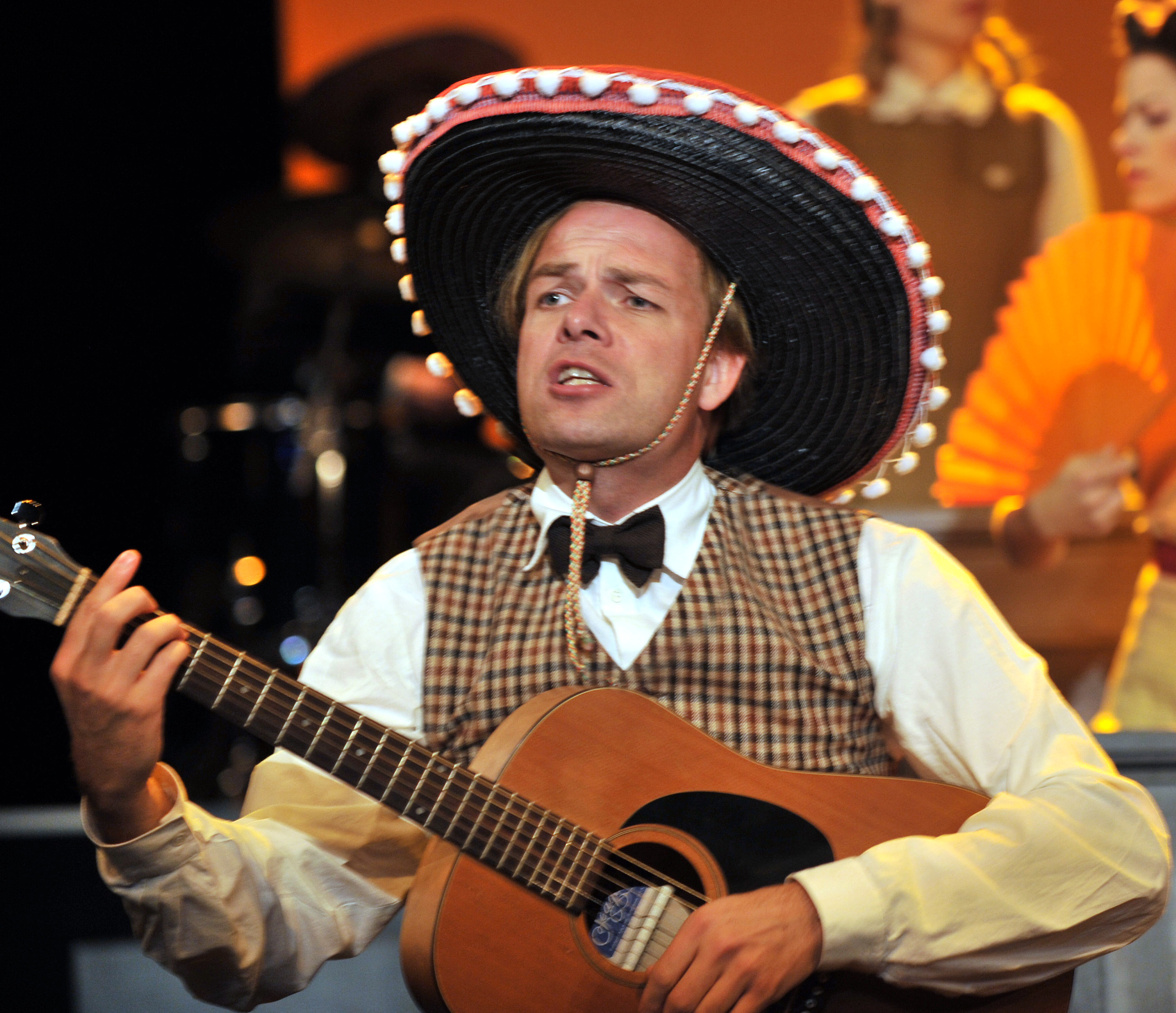
Viktor Skála

Viktor Skála is a Czech stage and television actor. He was born on 3 March 1968, Brno, Czechoslovakia. He is a member of the Brno City Theatre.

== Theatre ==
=== City Theatre ===
- Master and Margarita .... master
- Manon Lescaut .... Tiberge
- Smrt obchodního cestujícího .... Bernard
- Peer Gynt .... Peer Gynt
- Nevyléčitelní .... Bruce
- The Picture of Dorian Gray .... Alan Campbell
- Bez roucha .... Garry Lejeune
- Romeo and Jana .... Lucien
- Slaměný klobouk .... Beauerthuis
- V jámě lvové .... Mr. Strassky
- Marketa Lazarová .... Mr. Lazar
- Fiddler on the Roof .... officer
- Death of Paul I .... Tatarinov/Prince/Colonel
- The Diary of King .... Cyril Abid/Narrator
- Equus .... Martin Dysart
- Patrik Kumšt .... Boris/Viktor
- The Three Musketeers .... Daddy/King/Executioner
- Twelfth Night .... Malvolio
- Síla zvyku .... Juggler
- Cyrano de Bergerac .... De Guiche
- Love's Labour's Lost .... Kotrba
- Mourning Becomes Electra .... Adam Brant
- One Flew Over the Cuckoo's Nest .... Dale Harding
- Cabaret .... Ernst Ludwig
- Kamenný most aneb Prostopášník .... Arlecchino
- Henry VIII .... First Man
- Máj .... Poet
- Arcadia .... Septimus Hodge
- Znamení kříže .... Gil, village guy
- Ginger and Fred .... Author
- Amfitryon .... Mercur
- The Importance of Being Earnest .... John Worthing
- Hair .... Psychologist/Officer
- Odysseia .... Hades
- Not Now, Darling .... Arnold Crouch
- Red and Black .... François-Marie Arouet Voltaire
- The Magic Flute .... Spokesman

== Filmography ==
- Velkofilm (2007)
- Já z toho budu mít smrt (2005)
- Krev zmizelého (2003)
- Elektrický nůž (1999)
- "Četnické humoresky" (1997) TV series
- Případ s černým vzadu (1992)
- Svlékání kůže (1991)
- Král lenochů (1989)
- Třetí sudička (1986)
