= Jiří Holý =

- Born: November 27, 1922; Ružomberok, Czechoslovakia
- Died: November 11, 2009 (aged 86); Prague, Czech Republic
- Occupation: Actor
- Years active: 1952-2006

Jiří Holý (27 November 1922 in Ružomberok – 11 November 2009 in Prague) was a Czech actor. He starred in the film Poslední propadne peklu under director Ludvík Ráža in 1982.

== Selected filmography ==
- Horoucí srdce (1963)
- Lupič Legenda (1972)
- Hroch (1973)
- Tam, kde hnízdí čápi (1975)
- The day that shook the world (1975)
