= Štěpánka Haničincová =

Czech actress, screenwriter, dramaturge and children's television presenter

- Haničincová presenting on TV
- Born: Štěpánka Hubáčková; 30 September 1931; Kvíčovice, Czechoslovakia
- Died: 27 October 1999 (aged 68); Prague, Czech Republic
- Education: Faculty of Theatre in Prague

Štěpánka Haničincová (née Hubáčková; 30 September 1931 – 27 October 1999) was a Czech actress, screenwriter, dramaturge and children's television presenter.

== Early life ==
Haničincová was born Štěpánka Hubáčková in Kvíčovice on 30 September 1931. Her father was a shoemaker. She spent her early childhood in the town of Heřmanův Městec, before her parents divorced and she moved with her mother to Děčín.

She was the first wife of actor Petr Haničinec, whom she met at the Faculty of Theatre in Prague where they both studied. The couple had one child, a daughter named Alexandra. Her second husband was director Jan Valášek who died in 1968 and her last husband was the actor Jan Přeučil. She had a total of two children.

== Career ==
Haničincová was a children's television presenter on Czech TV. Prior to making her television debut, she took part in amateur theatre. She was first broadcast in 1953. Her other television roles included being an actress, screenwriter and dramaturge. One of the films she appeared in, Honzíkova cesta, won a silver medal at the Venice Film Festival. Haničincová was voted into the TýTý Hall of Fame at the annual TýTý television awards in February 1999, in recognition of her contribution to television in her nation.

Following a fall where Haničincová hit her head on a radiator, she died at the age of 68 in Prague in October 1999. Her death was said to be linked to alcohol. Haničinec described her as "an intelligent and benevolent lady". Haničincová's life story was the subject of a 2003 television documentary broadcast by state television network Czech Television.
