= Václav Kotva =

Czech actor (1922–2004)

- Born: 20 January 1922; Radnice, Czechoslovakia
- Died: 2 November 2004 (aged 82); Prague, Czech Republic
- Occupation: Actor
- Years active: 1966–2004

Václav Kotva (20 January 1922 – 2 November 2004) was a Czech actor.

== Teaching career ==
After graduation in the 1950s Kotva became a teacher. As a practising Christian, Kotva was regarded as politically suspect and potentially disloyal by the Czechoslovak communist administration; he was permitted to teach only in remote rural regions.

== Theatre ==
Kotva participated in amateur theatre in his hometown, Radnice, and began acting professionally in Ostrava, at the regional Petra Bezruče Theatre, in 1959. In 1965 he moved to Prague, becoming a founding member of the Činoherní klub theater there. The Činoherní klub became a centre of Czech cultural life during the 1960s and remained so during the 1970s. Kotva remained active at the Činoherní klub until the 1990s. He won critical acclaim for his roles in classical Russian drama, including Gogol's The Government Inspector and The Cherry Orchard by Anton Chekhov. He also made guest appearances at the National Theatre (Prague).

== Film and TV ==
- 1973: Wolz - Leben und Verklärung eines deutschen Anarchisten (DEFA - Regie: Günter Reisch)

Kotva made dozens of appearances in Czechoslovak movies and television. His film debut in 1966 came with a role as a railway supervisor in Jiří Menzel's Oscar-winning Closely Watched Trains. He appeared too in the 1966 Czechoslovak New Wave film Hotel pro cizince, by Antonín Máša, playing a vagabond, and in 1968's The Cremator by Juraj Herz. Kotva's sole leading role came in Svatej z Krejcárku (1969), in which he played a shoemaker named Lájošek. The majority of his roles, and those for which he is best known in Czech cinema, featured Kotva as a supporting actor, often playing shy, introverted and odd personalities.
