= Petr Haničinec =

Czech actor

- Born: 15 September 1930; Pardubice, Czechoslovakia
- Died: 7 November 2007 (aged 77); Bratronice, Czech Republic
- Occupation: Actor
- Years active: 1955–1999

Petr Haničinec (15 September 1930 in Pardubice – 7 November 2007 in Bratronice) was a Czech actor. He starred in the film Poslední propadne peklu under director Ludvík Ráža in 1982.

== Life ==
Petr Haničinec was born in 1930 and he attended the conservatory after facing poor support from his family. His first wife was Štěpánka Haničincová who became an iconic children's TV presenter whilst he went into the theatre. Haničincová died as a result of alcohol. He then married Marie Kyselková. He was to have two more wives.

He starred in the film Poslední propadne peklu under director Ludvík Ráža in 1982.

== Partial filmography ==
- Against All (1956)
- Proti vsem (1957) - Ondrej z Hvozdna
- Tam na konecne (1957)
- Tenkrát o vánocích (1958) - Podporucík jílek
- Sedmý kontinent (1960) - Karel Kolafa
- Na lane (1963) - Rudolf - Kája's brother
- The Treasure of a Byzantine Merchant (1967) - Fábera - driver
- Objízdka (1968) - Julius (voice)
- Cerný vlk (1972) - nadporucík Tomícek
- Kronika zhavého léta (1973) - Jirí Bagár
- Horká zima (1974) - Karl
- Pavlínka (1974) - tkadlec Holan
- Televize v Bublicích aneb Bublice v televizi (1974) - predseda JZD
- Smrt mouchy (1977) - Sláma
- Stín létajícího ptácka (1977) - vedoucí stavební komise Vojta Sochor
- Reknem si to prístí léto (1978) - Cyril
- Kam nikdo nesmi (1979) - Capt. Gregor
- Svítalo celou noc (1980) - Bláha
- Poslední propadne peklu (1982) - Bartos
- Zachvev strachu (1984) - Antos (voice)
- Horký podzim s vuní manga (1984) - Hrouzek
- Cesta kolem mé hlavy (1984) - psychiatrist MUDr. Viceník
- Salar (1986) - Narrator
- Osudy dobrého vojáka Svejka (1986) - Josef Svejk (voice)
- Cas sluhu (1989) - Stach, zástupce reditele
- Lady Macbeth von Mzensk (1992) - Boris
- Zdislava z Lemberka (1994)
