= Radovan Lukavský =

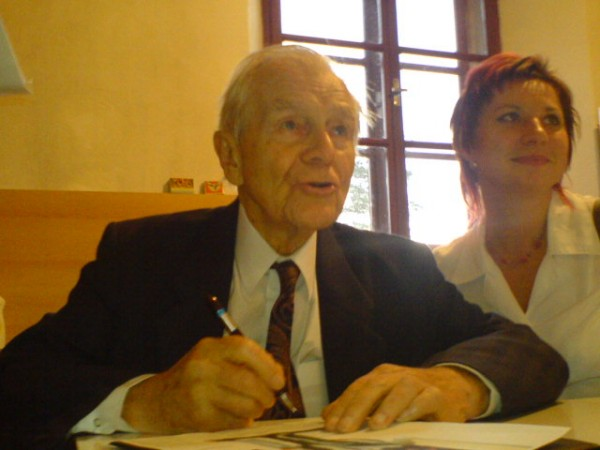
- Radovan Lukavský (2007)
- Born: 1 November 1919; Prague, Czechoslovakia
- Died: 10 March 2008 (aged 88); Prague, Czech Republic
- Occupation: Actor
- Years active: 1946–2008

Radovan Lukavský (1 November 1919 – 10 March 2008) was a Czech theatre and film actor.

== Life and career ==
Lukavský was born in Prague, Czechoslovakia, in 1919. He graduated from high school in Český Brod, before continuing his education at the Charles University, where he studied French and English literature. However, at the onset of the Nazi occupation of Czechoslovakia, Lukavský was sent to a forced labor camp. He completed his studies at the Charles University only after being released from the camp. He also studied acting at Prague's conservatory.

Lukavský got his first acting job in 1946 at the Vinohrady Theatre in Prague district of Vinohrady. He was reportedly usually cast as honest characters due to his appearance and voice. He was offered a position at the National Theatre in Prague in 1957. He continued to work as an actor at the National Theatre for over fifty years. His most famous roles at the theatre included that of Puck in William Shakespeare’s Midsummer Night's Dream and the Sergeant in Bertolt Brecht’s Mother Courage.

Outside of the theatre and stage, Lukavský enjoyed a number of roles in Czech and Czechoslovak television and film throughout his career. He may be best known for his role in the 1970s adaptation of Czech novelist Alois Jirásek's F.L. Věk, in which he played Václav Thám, a Czech national revival leader.

In 1986 he appeared in a TV film adaptation of the Božena Benešová short story "Povídka s dobrým koncem" ("A Story with a Happy Ending").

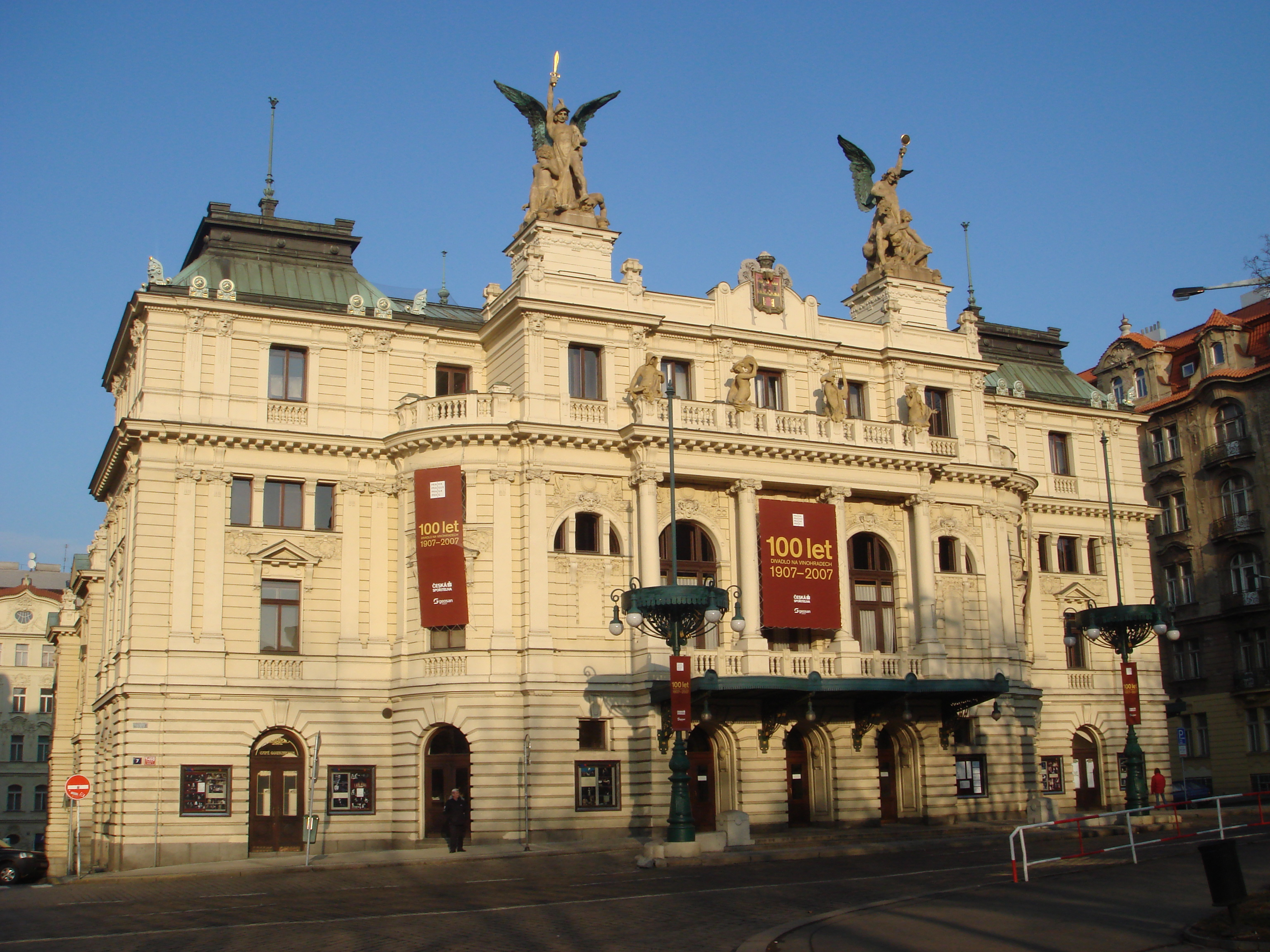
The Vinohrady Theatre where Lukavský got his first acting role in 1946. Lukavský also performed his last role at the theatre in The Cherry Orchard at the age of 88.

Lukavský received a number of awards for his work during his career. He was given the lifetime achievement award at the 1995 Thalia Awards, which are the leading honors for the Czech Republic's theatre industry. Former Czech President Václav Havel also awarded Lukavský a medal for services to the theatre.

Additionally, he was the author of several books on acting and the theatre. He taught for many years at the Academy of Performing Arts in Prague.

Lukavský returned to the theatre at age 88 when he performed in Anton Chekhov’s The Cherry Orchard at the Vinohrady Theatre. The Vinohrady Theatre is the same theatre where he earned his first acting role back in 1946 when he was a recent university graduate.

Lukavský died in Prague on 10 March 2008 at the age of 88.
