= Ivan Vyskočil =

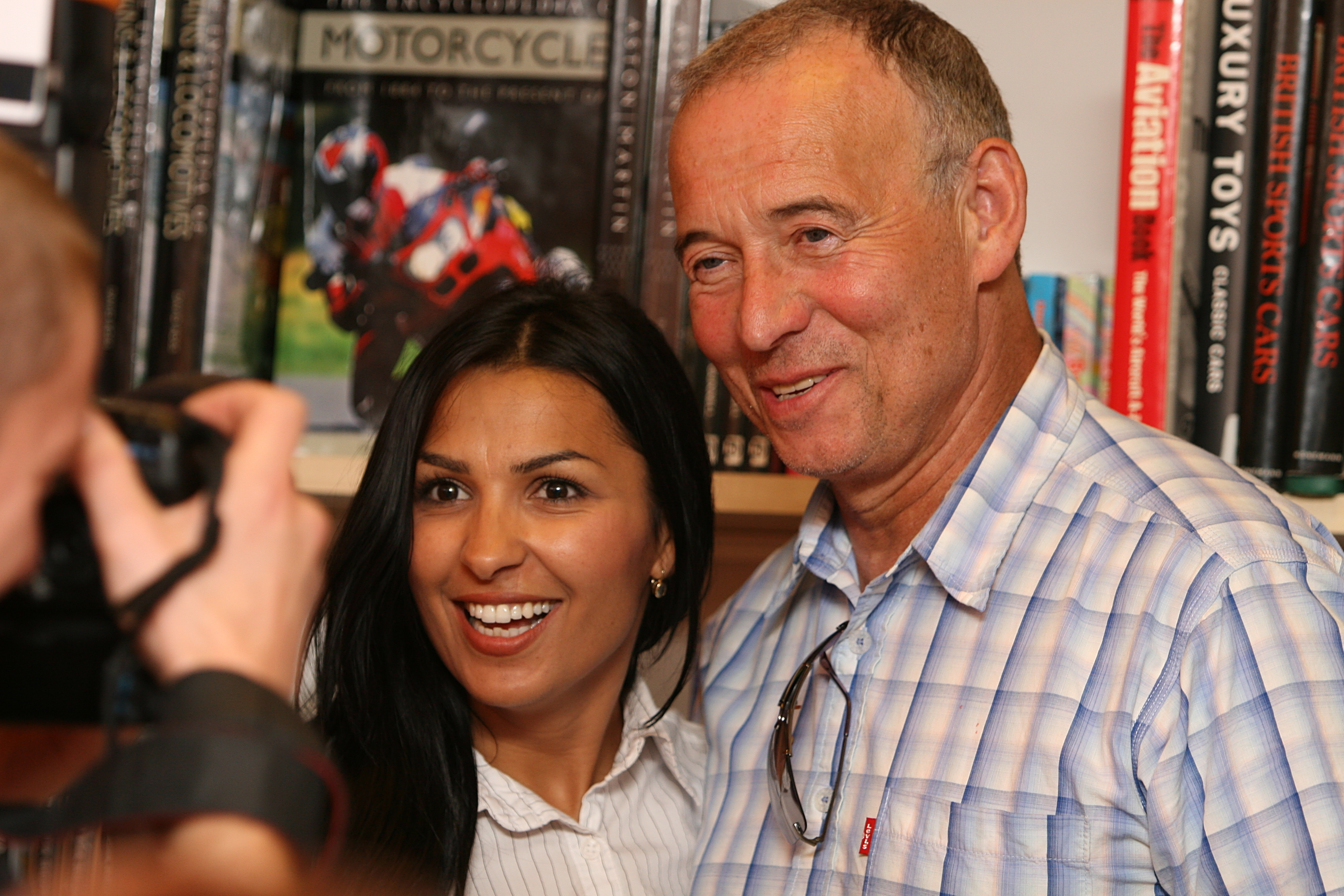
- Vyskočil with his former wife Anife
- Born: 21 May 1946 (age 78); Prague, Czechoslovakia
- Occupation: Actor
- Years active: 1964–present
- Children: 1

Ivan Vyskočil (born 21 May 1946 in Prague) is a Czech actor. He starred in the film Poslední propadne peklu under director Ludvík Ráža in 1982.

== Selected filmography ==
- "Romance" segment in Pearls of the Deep (1966)
- The Tailor from Ulm (1978)
- The Young Man and Moby Dick (1979)
- Poslední propadne peklu (1982)
- Smrt krásných srnců (1986)
