= Department of Dramatic Theatre at the Academy of Performing Arts, Prague =

Drama school in Czechia

Theatre Faculty of the Academy of Performing Arts in Prague
- Divadelní fakulta Akademie múzických umění v Praze
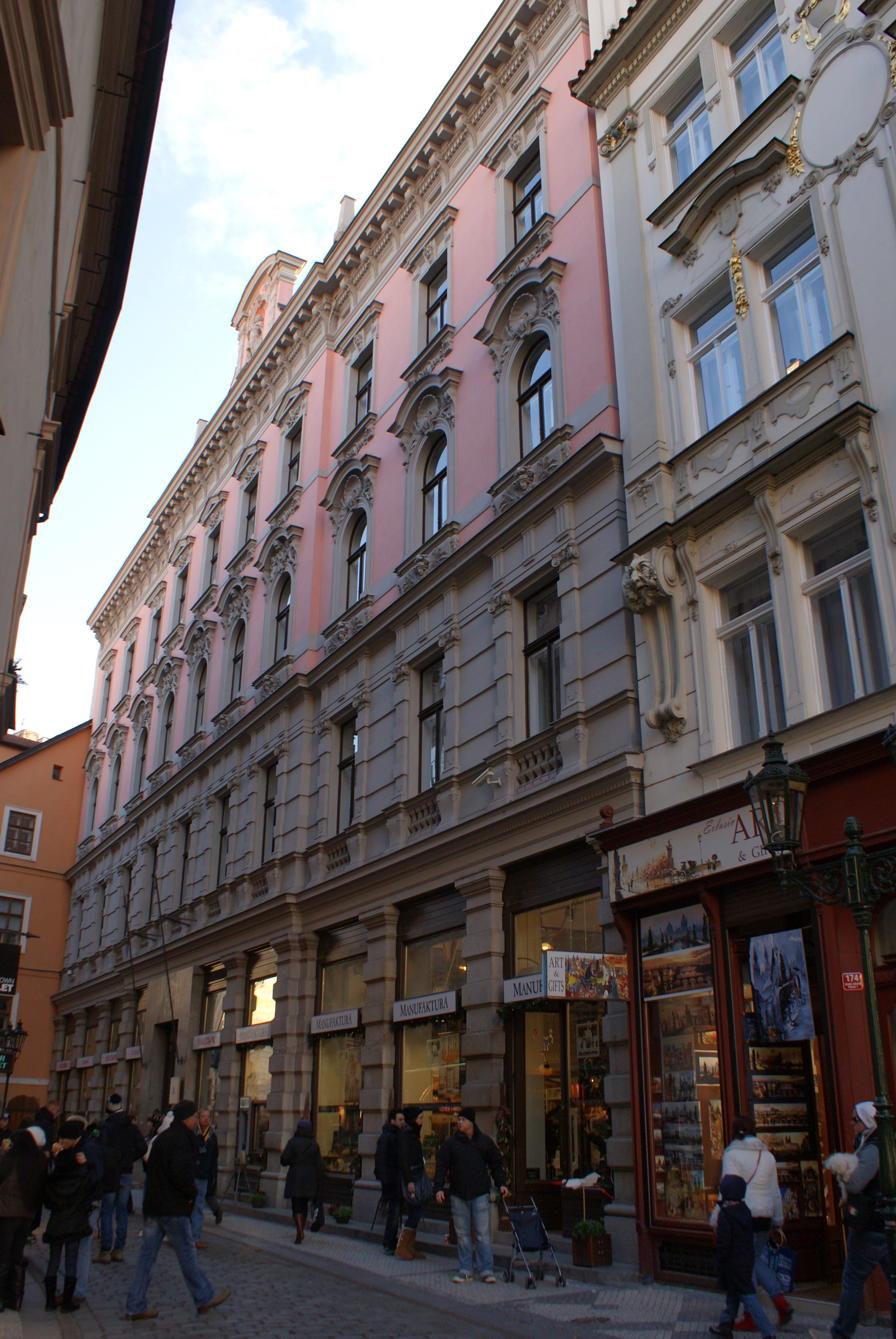
- Type: Public
- Established: 1945/46
- Dean: Daniela Jobertová
- Location: Prague, Czech Republic; 50°5′9.6″N 14°25′2″E
- Website: https://www.damu.cz/en/?

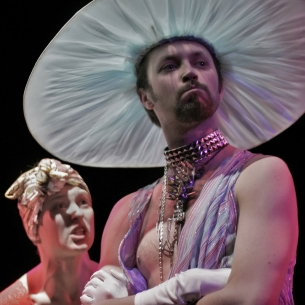
From "Hra", a theatre performance by DAMU students

The Department of Dramatic Theatre (Czech: Divadelní fakulta Akademie múzických umění v Praze, abbreviated DAMU) is one of three departments at the Academy of Performing Arts in Prague (alongside the Film and TV school and the Department of Music). The academy was opened in 1945 immediately after the Second World War as a part of the newly created academy for the arts. The department's teachers have included prominent personalities in modern Czech theatre, such as Otomar Krejča, set designer František Tröster, Ivan Vyskočil, director Jiří Frejka, and Miroslav Haller. DAMU is a member of the European League of Institutes of the Arts (ELIA) and the European network on cultural management and policy (ENCATC).

== Departments ==
The two main departments of the school are:

- Department of Dramatic Theatre, which prepares students for the repertory theatre system and educates them in interpreting classic and contemporary texts
- Department of Alternative Theatre and Puppetry, including a sub-department devoted to scenography and a division for alternative stage design

Other departments include:

- Department of Stage Design
- Department of Authorial Creation and Pedagogy, educating in performance, including an improvisational acting discipline developed by Professor Ivan Vyskočil, called "Acting with the Inner Partner".
- Department of Drama in Education, educating in the role of theatre in education
- Department of Theory and Criticism, educating in theatre criticism and theoretical subjects
- Department of Arts Management, educating in theatre management

The Department of Dramatic Theatre has recently introduced doctoral studies in four areas:

- Stage Creation and the Theory of Stage Creation
- Theory and Practice of Theatre Creation
- Alternative Theatre, Puppetry and its Theory
- Authorial Acting and Theory of Authorial Creation and Pedagogy

== Notable alumni ==
- Anda-Louise Bogza, Romanian singer.
- Ivana Chýlková (born 1963), Czech actress, graduated from DAMU in 1985.
- Štěpánka Haničincová, TV presenter.
- Petr Haničinec, actor
- Juraj Herz, Slovak film director (The Cremator), studied at DAMU's Department of Puppetry in 1954–1958.
- Tomáš Klus (born 1986), Czech singer-songwriter, graduated from DAMU in drama in 2012.
- Jan Kubíček (1927–2013), Czech constructivist painter and graphic designer, studied at DAMU in 1954–1957.
- Karel Roden (born 1962), Czech actor, graduated from DAMU in 1985.
- Martin Stropnický (born 1956), Czech politician, Minister of Foreign Affairs (2017–), graduated from DAMU in 1980.
- Jan Švankmajer (born 1934), Czech film-maker and animator, studied at DAMU's Department of Puppetry in 1954-1958.
- Alena Vostrá (1938–1992), Czech novelist, graduated from DAMU in 1966 in dramaturgy.

== Deans of DAMU ==
- 1946–1948 Jiří Frejka
- 1948–1949 Klementina Rektorisová
- 1949–1950 František Götz
- 1950–1952 Jan Kopecký
- 1952–1953 František Götz
- 1953–1954 Vladimír Adámek
- 1954–1955 František Salzer
- 1955–1958 Josef Bezdíček
- 1958–1961 František Salzer
- 1961–1963 Antonín Dvořák
- 1963–1970 František Salzer
- 1970–1972 Jan Císař
- 1972–1985 Eva Šmeralová
- 1985–1989 Jana Makovská
- 1990–1991 Jan Dušek
- 1991–1994 Miloslav Klíma
- 1994–1997 Miloš Horanský
- 1997–2000 Vladimír Mikeš
- 2000–2006 Markéta Kočvarová-Schartová
- 2006–2013 Jan Hančil
- 2013–2021 Doubravka Svobodová
- 2021–2025 Karel František Tománek
- 2025–present Daniela Jobertová
Productions

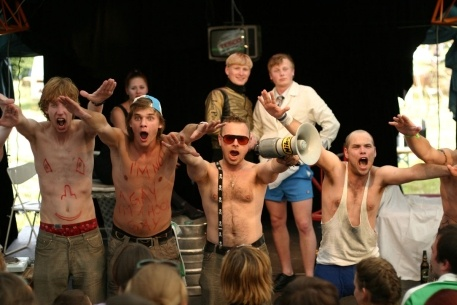
Muzske zalesitosti

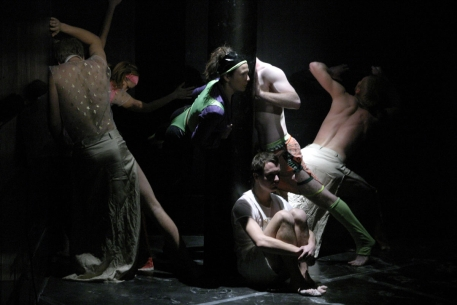
Titus Andronicus (photo: Martin Vosáhlo)
