= Ludvík Ráža =

Czech film director

Ludvík Ráža (3 October 1929 in Mukachevo – 4 October 2000 in Prague) was a Czech film director.

== Selected filmography ==
- Tajemství Ocelového města (1979)
- Poslední propadne peklu (1982)
- The Territory of White Deer (TV series; 1991)
