= Rychlé šípy (TV series) =

- Directed by: Michal Žabka
- Country of origin: Czech Republic
- Original language: Czech
- No. of seasons: 1
- No. of episodes: 7

Production
- Running time: 13 minutes

Original release
- Network: ČT Déčko
- Release: 1 November – 13 December 2025

Rychlé šípy (The Fast Arrows) is a animated television series broadcast by Czech Television. The first episode aired on 1 November 2025 on the ČT Déčko channel. The series is set in the fictional 1940s in Prague.

The series is based on the original comic book series by Jaroslav Foglar, Rychlé šípy, which was first published in 1938. Due to the short length of the original, the individual stories had to be significantly expanded for the purposes of television adaptation. The animation adaptation tries to be similar to the comic book.

== Voice actors ==
- Jaroslav Plesl as Mirek Dušín
- Matěj Hádek as Jarka Metelka
- Matouš Ruml as Červenáček
- Jan Maxián as Rychlonožka
- Jiří Panzner as Jindra Hojer
- Lukáš Příkazký as Dlouhé Bidlo
- Martin Písařík as Štětináč
- Matouš Ruml as Bohouš

== Episodes ==
Episode		Directed by	Written by	Original air date (millions)
1	Rychlé šípy se seznamují	Michal Žabka	Adam Gebert	1 November 2025
2	Rychlé šípy v zajetí kouzel	Michal Žabka	Adam Gebert	8 November 2025
3	Rychlé šípy na zimní výpravě	Michal Žabka	Adam Gebert	15 November 2025
4	Rychlé šípy luští tajemství	Michal Žabka	Adam Gebert	22 November 2025
5	Rychlé šípy ve vodní pasti	Michal Žabka	Adam Gebert	29 November 2025
6	Rychlé šípy proti Podkovákům	Michal Žabka	Adam Gebert	6 December 2025
7	Rychlé šípy a tábor na ostrově	Michal Žabka	Adam Gebert	13 December 2025
