= Hedgehog in the Cage =

Mechanical puzzle

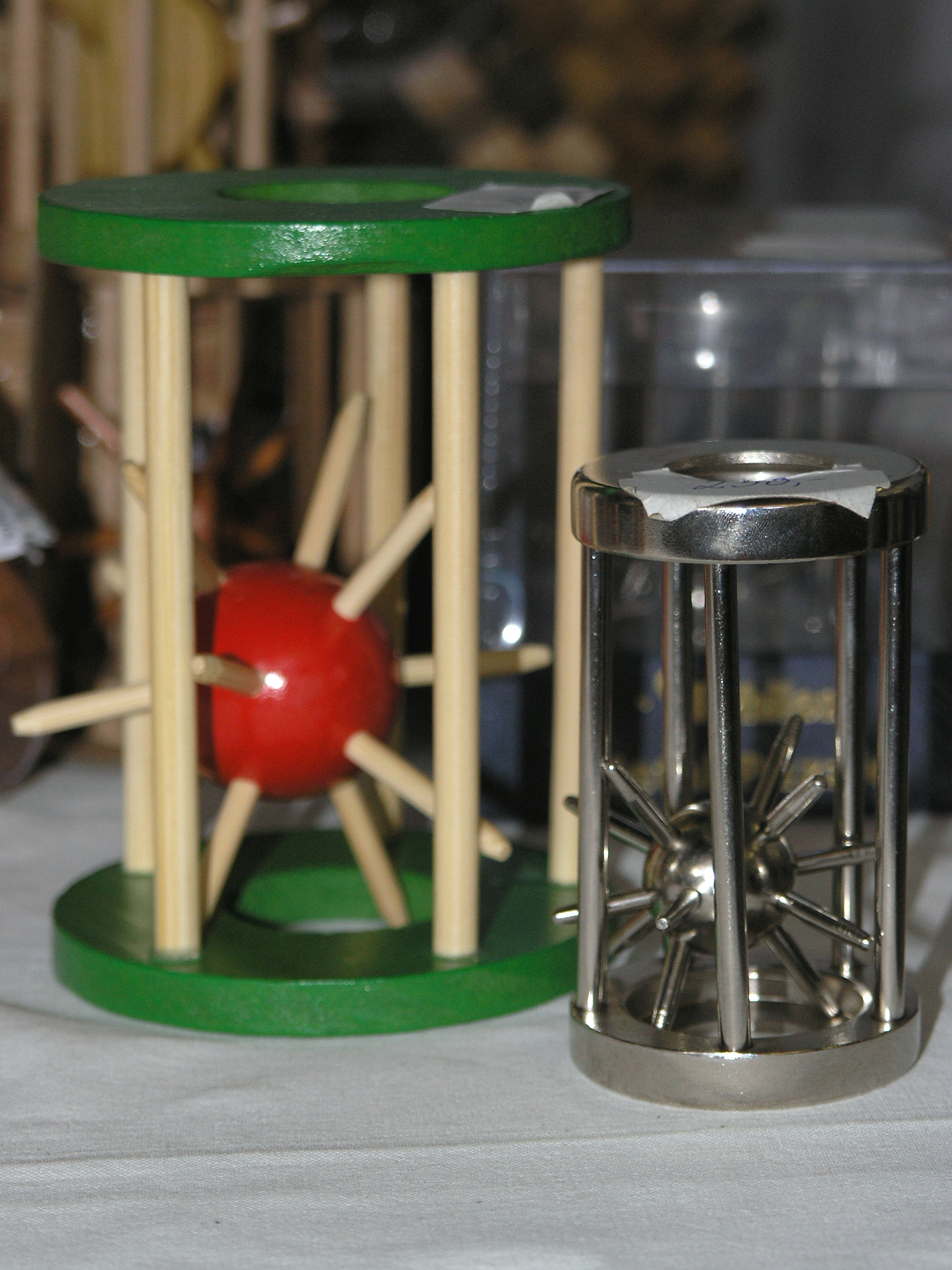
Two Hedgehog puzzles

Hedgehog in the Cage (in Czech: Ježek v kleci) is a mechanical puzzle popular in the Czech Republic which features prominently in the "Dobrodružství v temných uličkách" (Adventures in the Dark Alleys) trilogy of adventure stories by Jaroslav Foglar. The puzzle consists of a small sphere with protruding spikes of various lengths contained within a cylinder perforated with holes of different sizes. The challenge posed by the puzzle is how to release the sphere (the hedgehog) from the cylinder (the cage).

== History ==
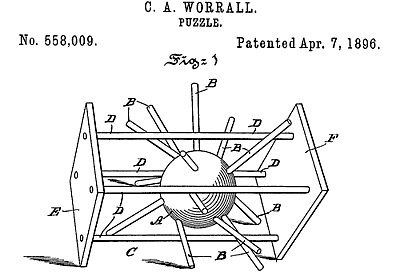
The first known model of the puzzle, patented by Clarence A. Worrall

Although known mainly through the children's stories written by the Czech Jaroslav Foglar in the 1940s, the Hedgehog in the Cage has its origins in the United States. The first known similar puzzles were made since 1886 by the Trilby company in Brooklyn. The puzzle was patented by the American inventor Clarence A. Worrall in Philadelphia, Pennsylvania, on 7 April 1896. It has been suggested that Worrall's invention was inspired by a Japanese puzzle called the Snake and Star, which appeared in the catalogue of the games manufacturer Selchow & Righter on 25 May 1895. The principle of both inventions is similar: solving the puzzle involves finding the correct position and angle that allows the object ("the hedgehog" or "the star") to be removed from its entrapment in the cage or the snake.

It is not known exactly how Jaroslav Foglar knew the puzzle, but he probably encountered a copy of the one made by the Trilby company—a few instances of the puzzle could be found on the territory of the First Czechoslovak Republic. The Hedgehog puzzle was produced in Czechoslovakia since 1941 at a toy factory in Roudnice nad Labem.

=== Mystery of the Conundrum ===
The masked "Supreme Vont" alias "Široko" (Scirocco), holding the Hedgehog in the Cage. A screenshot from the TV series Záhada hlavolamu about Rychlé šípy club (1969).

It was not until 1940 that it achieved its remarkable level of popularity, when Jaroslav Foglar published Záhada hlavolamu (Mystery of the Conundrum), the first part of his sequence of stories about the Rychlé šípy ("Rapid Arrows") boys' club. (Note: The first edition of the novel was published in sequels in a popular magazine Mladý hlasatel (Young Herald) from 1940.) Rychlé šípy comics series began to appear in the magazine Mladý hlasatel (Young Herald) in December 1938, and gradually became the most popular series in the history of the Czech comics. However, their adventures involving the Hedgehog in the Cage are written in the standard novel form.

The Hedgehog in the Cage plays a key role in the story and its sequels in the trilogy, Stínadla se bouří (The Shades are Revolting) and Tajemství velkého Vonta (Secret of the Supreme Vont). The novel tells the story of a young apprentice locksmith Jan Tleskač, who invents a flying bicycle. Tleskač also owns a copy of the puzzle, which he refers to as the "Hedgehog in the Cage". He succeeds in removing the hedgehog from its cage, splits the sphere in two parts and hides the plans of his invention inside it before reuniting the two hemispheres and replacing the Hedgehog inside its Cage. After Tleskač's mysterious death, local children take the Hedgehog as a symbol of leadership for their secret society.

== Cultural references ==
From the 1940s onwards, the puzzle was manufactured in Czechoslovakia in a variety of forms and sizes. It became particularly popular in 1969 when Czechoslovak Television broadcast a TV series based on the novel.

The Removing the Hedgehog from the Cage World Championship has been held annually in the Czech Republic since 2000.

In 2010, an exhibition was held in the Galerie jedné věci gallery in Prague to commemorate the 70th anniversary of the novel's publication. 70 variants of the puzzle were displayed in the exhibition. Among them was a golden Hedgehog in the Cage and Tleskač's bicycle.
