= List of Tokyo Revengers chapters =

Tokyo Revengers is a Japanese manga series written and illustrated by Ken Wakui. It was serialized in Kodansha's shōnen manga magazine Weekly Shōnen Magazine from March 1, 2017, to November 16, 2022. Kodansha collected its 278 individual chapters in 31 tankōbon volumes, released from May 17, 2017, to January 17, 2023.

In North America, Kodansha USA started the digital release of the manga in 2018. Seven Seas Entertainment started releasing the manga in a print omnibus edition in 2022.

The manga is also licensed in Taiwan by Tong Li Publishing, in South Korea by Haksan Publishing, in France by Glénat Editions, in Germany by Carlsen Manga, in Italy by J-Pop, in Spain by Norma Editorial, in Mexico by Panini Comics, in Brazil by Editora JBC, in Argentina by Editorial Ivrea, in Thailand by Vibulkij Publishing, in Indonesia by Elex Media Komputindo, in Vietnam by IPM, in Poland by Waneko, in Turkey by Gerekli Şeyler, in Russia by XL Media, in Ukraine by Nasha Idea, and in the Czech Republic by Crew.

On October 28, 2021, a parody spin-off manga written and illustrated by Shinpei Funatsu, titled Tōdai Revengers, was announced. It was serialized in Kodansha's Magazine Pocket website from November 3, 2021, to March 29, 2023. It was collected in six tankōbon volumes from February 17, 2022, to May 17, 2023.

On June 20, 2022, a spin-off manga centered around Keisuke Baji and Chifuyu Matsuno written and illustrated by Yukinori Kawaguchi, titled Tokyo Revengers: A Letter from Keisuke Baji, was announced. It began serialization in Magazine Pocket on July 27, 2022. It has been collected in five tankōbon volumes as of June 17, 2024. The series is set to end with its sixth volume. Kodansha publishes the spin-off in English on their K Manga service. Seven Seas Entertainment has also licensed the spin-off in North America.

== Volumes ==
=== Tokyo Revengers ===
No.	Original release date	Original ISBN	English release date	English ISBN
1	May 17, 2017	978-4-06-395938-3	October 16, 2018 (digital); July 26, 2022 (physical)	978-1-64212-515-3 (digital); 978-1-63858-571-8 (physical)
1. "Reborn"; 2. "Resist"; 3. "Resolve"; 4. "Relieve"; 5. "Revolve"
2	July 14, 2017	978-4-06-510033-2	December 18, 2018 (digital); July 26, 2022 (physical)	978-1-64212-580-1 (digital); 978-1-63858-571-8 (physical)
6. "Return"; 7. "Rejoin"; 8. "Reseparate"; 9. "Releap"; 10. "Reply"; 11. "Reburn"; 12. "Remind"; 13. "Regret"; 14. "Resort"
3	September 15, 2017	978-4-06-510188-9	January 15, 2019 (digital); August 30, 2022 (physical)	978-1-64212-617-4 (digital); 978-1-63858-572-5 (physical)
15. "Revive"; 16. "Reignition"; 17. "Redivide"; 18. "Rechange"; 19. "Restart"; 20. "Reinspire"; 21. "Revolt"; 22. "Reconflict"; 23. "Reseek"
4	November 17, 2017	978-4-06-510394-4	February 19, 2019 (digital); August 30, 2022 (physical)	978-1-64212-686-0 (digital); 978-1-63858-572-5 (physical)
24. "Revoke"; 25. "Rerise"; 26. "Realize"; 27. "Regain"; 28. "Reel"; 29. "Respect"; 30. "Recept"; 31. "Recognize"; 32. "Rebuild"; 33. "Revenge"
5	February 16, 2018	978-4-06-510969-4	March 19, 2019 (digital); November 1, 2022 (physical)	978-1-64212-708-9 (digital); 978-1-63858-622-7 (physical)
34. "Darkest Hour"; 35. "Odds and Ends"; 36. "Anyone's Guess"; 37. "Enter the Stage"; 38. "Break Up"; 39. "My Buddy"; 40. "No Pain, No gain" 41. "Double Cross"; 42. "Once Upon a Time"
6	April 17, 2018	978-4-06-511206-9	April 16, 2019 (digital); November 1, 2022 (physical)	978-1-64212-807-9 (digital); 978-1-63858-622-7 (physical)
43. "In those days" 44. "Screw up" 45. "Take out on" 46. "Made up my mind" 47. "Level with" 48. "No way" 49. "Grow apart" 50. "Before dawn" 51. "Open fire"
7	June 15, 2018	978-4-06-511620-3	May 14, 2019 (digital); February 7, 2023 (physical)	978-1-64212-840-6 (digital); 978-1-63858-734-7 (physical)
52. "Never Fear, I'm Here"; 53. "Turn Around"; 54. "Below The Belt"; 55. "No Match For"; 56. "The One"; 57. "Look Up For"; 58. "Dead Or Alive"; 59. "Get Mad"; 60. "One And Only"
8	September 14, 2018	978-4-06-512238-9	June 11, 2019 (digital); February 7, 2023 (physical)	978-1-64212-897-0 (digital); 978-1-63858-734-7 (physical)
61. "In Tears"; 62. "Last Wishes"; 63. "One For All"; 64. "End Of War"; 65. "My Fam"; 66. "Have An Affair"; 67. "Man-Crush"; 68. "Sunday Best"; 69. "Big Moment"; 70. "Tide Turns"
9	November 16, 2018	978-4-06-513248-7	July 16, 2019 (digital); April 18, 2023 (physical)	978-1-64212-931-1 (digital); 978-1-63858-865-8 (physical)
71. "Same Old Same Old"; 72. "An Old Tale"; 73. "A Crybaby"; 74. "Get Back"; 75. "Let One Down"; 76. "It is What it is" 77. "Gotta Go"; 78. "Hey, Pal"; 79. "Fuck Off"
10	January 17, 2019	978-4-06-513874-8	August 13, 2019 (digital); April 18, 2023 (physical)	978-1-64212-966-3 (digital); 978-1-63858-865-8 (physical)
80. "Thicker Than Water"; 81. "Stand Alone"; 82. "Own Up"; 83. "Big Brother"; 84. "Run Errands"; 85. "Family Bonds"; 86. "Be Serious About"; 87. "Strange Bedfellows"; 88. "Just Gotta Do"
11	March 15, 2019	978-4-06-514445-9	September 10, 2019 (digital); June 27, 2023 (physical)	978-1-64212-996-0 (digital); 978-1-68579-800-0 (physical)
89. "How You Met"; 90. "Christmas Eve"; 91. "Miss You"; 92. "Whip Up Morale"; 93. "Keep One's Vow"; 94. "Scaredy-Cat"; 95. "The Ordeal from God"; 96. "Always Here for You"; 97. "Sibling Rivalry"
12	June 17, 2019	978-4-06-515086-3	October 8, 2019 (digital); June 27, 2023 (physical)	978-1-64659-041-4 (digital); 978-1-68579-800-0 (physical)
98. "Strive Together"; 99. "A Verbal Shot"; 100. "Hundreds of Times"; 101. "Keep Mum"; 102. "Salute Someone"; 103. "Mother Figure"; 104. "Christmas Night"; 105. "No One Can Match"; 106. "Dawning of a New Era"; 107. "Tight-Knit"
13	August 16, 2019	978-4-06-515697-1	November 12, 2019 (digital); September 5, 2023 (physical)	978-1-64659-113-8 (digital); 978-1-68579-801-7 (physical)
108. "The Light of My Life"; 109. "Not Apt to Give any Way"; 110. "Best Wisnes"; 111. "Season Opener"; 112. "You're Fired"; 113. "You Have my Word"; 114. "On my Way Home"; 115. "Turn Over a New Leaf"; 116. "Far from Home"
14	October 17, 2019	978-4-06-517159-2	March 10, 2020 (digital); September 5, 2023 (physical)	978-1-64659-256-2 (digital); 978-1-68579-801-7 (physical)
117. "Last Order"; 118. "Life Comes and Goes"; 119. "Too Late to Be Sorry"; 120. "Can Take it" 121. "Last but not Least"; 122. "Twin to Dragon"; 123. "You're not my Type"; 124. "When it Rains, it Pours"; 125. "Brother in Arms"
15	December 17, 2019	978-4-06-517549-1	May 12, 2020 (digital); November 14, 2023 (physical)	978-1-64659-360-6 (digital); 978-1-68579-802-4 (physical)
126. "Two Peas in a Pod"; 127. "Be Fuzzy"; 128. "Gang of Four"; 129. "The Longest Day"; 130. "Pep Party"; 131. "Rest in Peace"; 132. "The Big Baddy"; 133. "Sell Out"; 134. "Mortal Enemy"
16	March 17, 2020	978-4-06-518167-6	July 14, 2020 (digital); November 14, 2023 (physical)	978-1-64659-594-5 (digital); 978-1-68579-802-4 (physical)
135. "Even I can" 136. "My lot in life" 137. "Run out of patience" 138. "Stick together" 139. "Make an exception" 140. "Back stab" 141. "Lay out a plan" 142. "Family tree" 143. "Come back to life"
17	May 15, 2020	978-4-06-518851-4	September 8, 2020 (digital); January 30, 2024 (physical)	978-1-64659-693-5 (digital); 978-1-68579-958-8 (physical)
144. "Big-hearted"; 145. "Go-to guy" 146. "A bad hunch" 147. "The root of all evil" 148. "Don't freak out" 149. "Arch villain" 150. "Damn it" 151. "Just do it" 152. "Rise against"
18	July 17, 2020	978-4-06-520106-0	November 10, 2020 (digital); January 30, 2024 (physical)	978-1-64659-799-4 (digital); 978-1-68579-958-8 (physical)
153. "NoctoKing"; 154. "Be in the van" 155. "Turn the tide" 156. "A den of iniquity" 157. "Money monger" 158. "Untamed heart" 159. "I know in my head" 160. "Stand no chance" 161. "The baby of the family"
19	September 17, 2020	978-4-06-520598-3	February 9, 2021 (digital); April 2, 2024 (physical)	978-1-64659-952-3 (digital); 979-8-88843-402-4 (physical)
162. "The blue ogre" 163. "Awaken my potential" 164. "Head the list" 165. "Things change, but not all" 166. "Brave heart" 167. "Who wouldn't" 168. "Headliner"; 169. "The home front" 170. "Homecoming"
20	December 17, 2020	978-4-06-521482-4	April 13, 2021 (digital); April 2, 2024 (physical)	978-1-63699-046-0 (digital); 979-8-88843-402-4 (physical)
171. "Showdown at the summit" 172. "Lose your touch" 173. "The one and only" 174. "Nothing is left" 175. "Admonitions are not sweet" 176. "What has been left" 177. "Déracinée"; 178. "Paradise lost" 179. "End the standoff"
21	February 17, 2021	978-4-06-522067-2	July 13, 2021 (digital); June 18, 2024 (physical)	978-1-63699-225-9 (digital); 979-8-88843-651-6 (physical)
180. "Run after" 181. "Take a vow" 182. "Present to the mind" 183. "Lay the plan" 184. "Wind something up" 185. "Meet his fate" 186. "It's been real" 187. "Way to go" 188. "The lion of the day"
22	April 16, 2021	978-4-06-522883-8	September 14, 2021 (digital); June 18, 2024 (physical)	978-1-63699-359-1 (digital); 979-8-88843-651-6 (physical)
189. "Break up" 190. "Until next time" 191. "Be the world to me" 192. "Just be close at hand" 193. "Feel great !"; 194. "The keepsake" 195. "Lingering scent" 196. "Can say that again" 197. "Be left behind the times"
23	July 16, 2021	978-4-06-524028-1	November 9, 2021 (digital); August 27, 2024 (physical)	978-1-63699-460-4 (digital); 979-8-88843-862-6 (physical)
198. "Lose myself in memory" 199. "Sincerely yours" 200. "Crack a smile" 201. "What's up?; 202. "Get away" 203. "Don't give a damn" 204. "Give me a hand" 205. "The picaresque" 206. "Let you down"
24	September 17, 2021	978-4-06-524839-3	February 8, 2022 (digital); August 27, 2024 (physical)	978-1-63699-612-7 (digital); 979-8-88843-862-6 (physical)
207. "The final act" 208. "Turbulent period" 209. "Get a grip" 210. "Face the music" 211. "The law of the jungle" 212. "Battle of the titans" 213. "Living legends" 214. "The engine fired" 215. "After a storm comes calm"
25	December 17, 2021	978-4-06-526284-9	April 12, 2022 (digital); November 5, 2024 (physical)	978-1-68491-125-7 (digital); 979-8-88843-862-6 (physical)
216. "Shows her color" 217. "Have never seen anything like it" 218. "Queen it over" 219. "A sense of foreboding" 220. "Bull's eye" 221. "Ups and downs of his fate" 222. "Give back" 223. "Good old days" 224. "Cutthroat"
26	February 17, 2022	978-4-06-526893-3	June 14, 2022 (digital); November 5, 2024 (physical)	978-1-68491-219-3 (digital); 979-8-88843-862-6 (physical)
225. "Free-for-all"; 226. "Dynamic duo" 227. "Gangster"; 228. "Beat hell out of" 229. "Go easy on" 230. "Get stuck-up" 231. "Blood-chilling"; 232. "It takes two to tango" 233. "Better late than never"
27	April 15, 2022	978-4-06-527526-9	October 11, 2022 (digital); January 7, 2025 (physical)	978-1-68491-483-8 (digital); 979-8-89160-304-2 (physical)
234. "There is no mending" 235. "Just be yourself" 236. "Band of brothers" 237. "Make allies" 238. "Really into it" 239. "Steel the show" 240. "Go into retirement" 241. "A forced smile" 242. "Inherit the crown"
28	June 17, 2022	978-4-06-528178-9	December 13, 2022 (digital); January 7, 2025 (physical)	978-1-68491-591-0 (digital); 979-8-89160-304-2 (physical)
243. "Wide array of" 244. "The showdown battle" 245. "Grow up to" 246. "Giant Killing"; 247. "Hey dude" 248. "Long time no see" 249. "Good chemistry" 250. "Turn the table" 251. "Get out of hand"
29	August 17, 2022	978-4-06-528657-9	February 14, 2023 (digital); March 25, 2025 (physical)	978-1-68491-700-6 (digital); 979-8-89160-485-8 (physical)
252. "Bring back" 253. "The worst is come" 254. "Train wreck" 255. "Holy cow!" 256. "Behind the scenes" 257. "Tipping point" 258. "Strange bedfellows" 259. "Like a something demoniac" 260. "Squaring off against"
30	November 17, 2022	978-4-06-529637-0	April 11, 2023 (digital); March 25, 2025 (physical)	978-1-68491-889-8 (digital); 979-8-89160-485-8 (physical)
261. "Opposite sides of the same coin" 262. "To rout and ravages" 263. "Be strong" 264. "Not only the force but also..." 265. "Stand by me" 266. "Make vision a reality" 267. "To signal a counterattack" 268. "Another such" 269. "All things must pass"
31	January 17, 2023	978-4-06-530344-3	June 13, 2023 (digital); March 25, 2025 (physical)	978-1-68491-968-0 (digital); 979-8-89160-485-8 (physical)
270. "Worth my while" 271. "Empty wish" 272. "Over again" 273. "Carry on" 274. "No holding back" 275. "Cold hearted" 276. "Get over" 277. "At last" 278. "Revengers"

=== Tōdai Revengers ===
No.	Original release date	Original ISBN	English release date	English ISBN
1	February 17, 2022	978-4-06-526902-2	November 26, 2024	979-8-89160-622-7
2	May 17, 2022	978-4-06-527914-4	November 26, 2024	979-8-89160-622-7
3	August 17, 2022	978-4-06-528745-3	March 11, 2025	979-8-89160-900-6
4	November 17, 2022	978-4-06-529632-5	March 11, 2025	979-8-89160-900-6
5	January 17, 2023	978-4-06-530345-0	July 22, 2025	979-8-89373-009-8
6	May 17, 2023	978-4-06-531572-9	July 22, 2025	979-8-89373-009-8

=== Tokyo Revengers: A Letter from Keisuke Baji ===
No.	Original release date	Original ISBN	English release date	English ISBN
1	November 17, 2022	978-4-06-529378-2	August 6, 2024	979-8-89160-305-9
2	January 17, 2023	978-4-06-530349-8	November 5, 2024	979-8-89160-306-6
3	May 17, 2023	978-4-06-531256-8	February 18, 2025	979-8-89160-406-3
4	October 17, 2023	978-4-06-532870-5; 978-4-06-532871-2 (SE)	June 3, 2025	979-8-89160-976-1
5	June 17, 2024	978-4-06-534571-9	October 7, 2025	979-8-89373-790-5
6	May 16, 2025	978-4-06-538413-8	February 3, 2026	979-8-89765-286-0
