= Štěpán Kopřiva =

Czech writer (born 1971)

Štěpán Kopřiva (born 13 March 1971 in Prague) is a Czech comics writer, science fiction writer, and screenwriter. He co-wrote Choking Hazard.
