= Čtyřlístek =

Czech comic book series

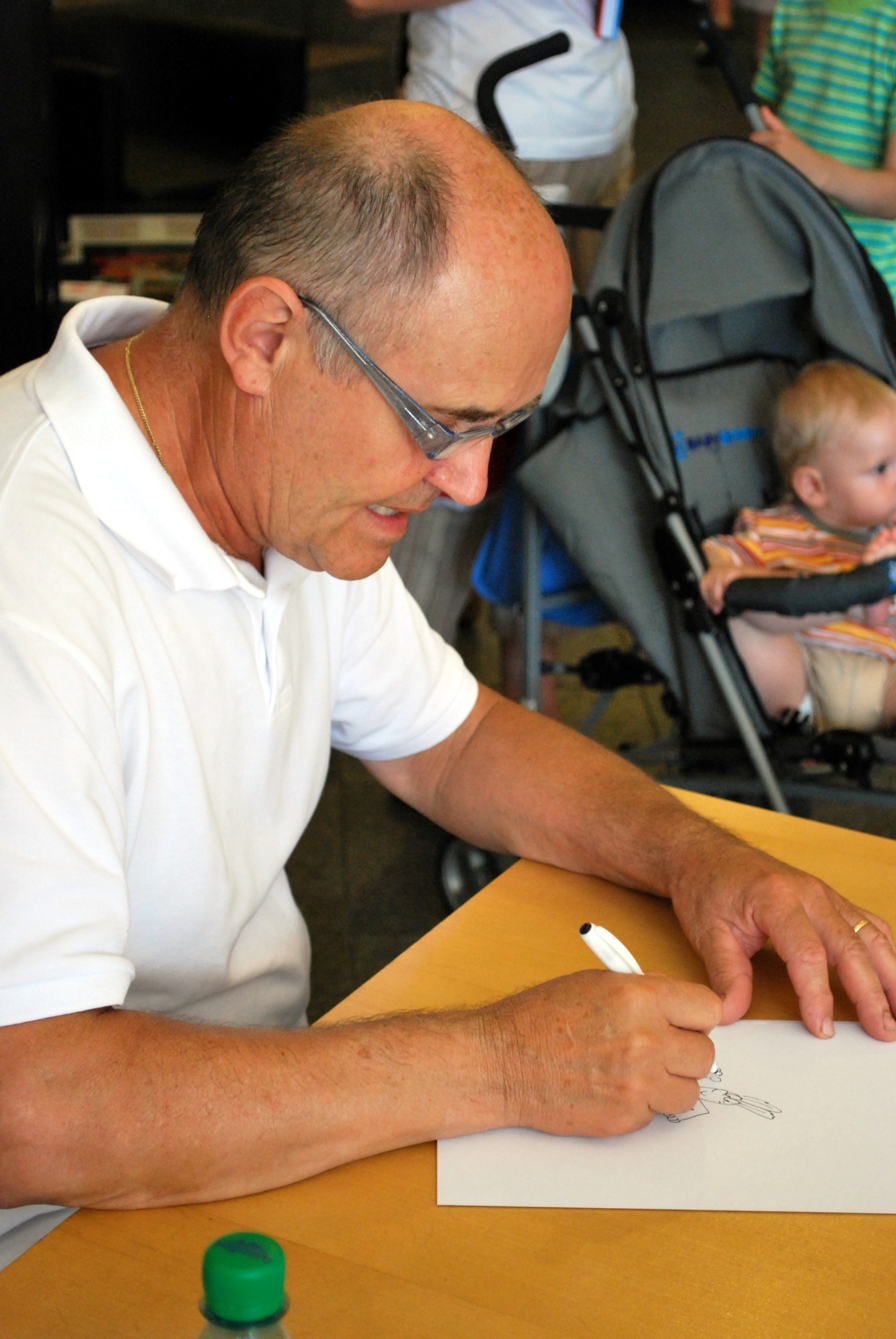
- Author Jaroslav Němeček draws character Pinďa

Publication information
- Format: Children's
- Publication date: 1969 to present
- No. of issues: 600 (as of 1 January 2016)

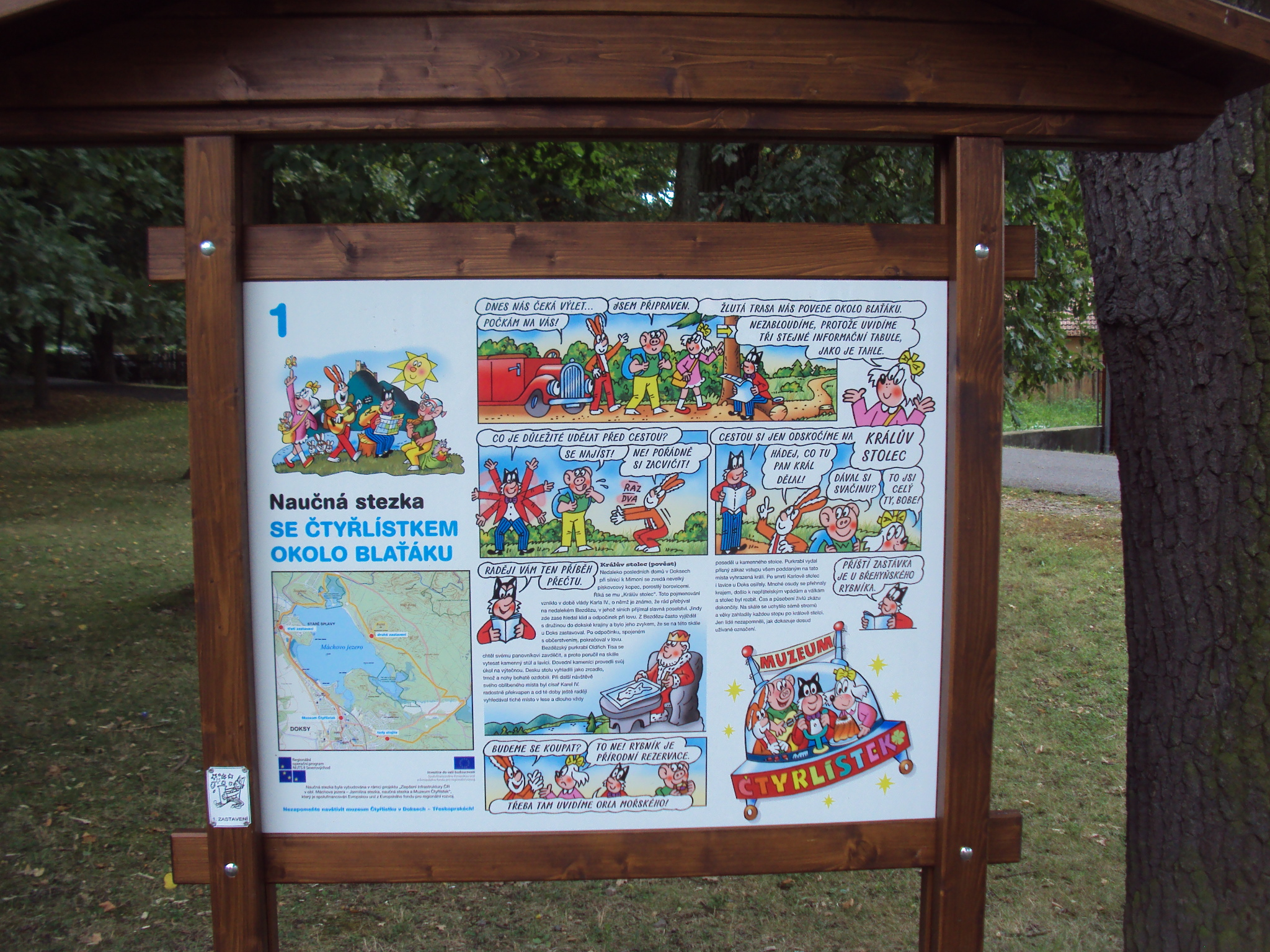
Čtyřlístek on nature trail

Čtyřlístek ("four-leaf clover") is a Czech comic book series continuously published since 15 May 1969 created by Jaroslav Němeček. In the 1980s an average edition contained about 220,000 prints and became one of the most popular comic books for children.

== Author ==
Čtyřlístek was created by Jaroslav Němeček, born in 1944 in Prague. He is an illustrator and he is accountable for multiple Czech comics, including Čaroděj Huriáš (wizard Huriáš) and Rexík. He also worked for a children's magazine called Mateřídouška.

== History ==
In 1969 Jaroslav Němeček and his wife created the comic strip series Čtyřlístek. It was created at their cottage in Doksy. The first comic named Inventions of Professor Myšpulín had 30,000 prints and sold out, motivating them to continue with the comic and create additional episodes. From the seventh episode they started writing also with Ljuba Štíplová. The numbers of prints rapidly increased, going up to 220,000. From 1990 the comic started working with multiple authors. In 2015 the 600th edition was printed, and at the beginning of 2019 the comic celebrated 50 years in print.

== Plot ==
The comic has five main characters - Myšpulín, a geeky cat; Bobík, a tough pig; Fifinka, a pretty dog, Pind'a, a silly rabbit, and Myska, an assistant mouse. They live in the same house in the small fictitious village of Třeskoprsky, somewhere near Podbezdězí, near where the author resided.

== Characters ==
=== Myšpulín ===
Myšpulín, a black and white tomcat who dons a red jacket, blue striped trousers, a purple bow tie, and black and white shoes. He's a genius inventor, creates inventions like time machines, self-driving autonomous vehicles, and robots. He is very clever, calm and innovative. His hobbies include spending time in nature, going on adventures with his friends, and inventing. He enjoys eating food prepared by Fifi.

=== Bobík ===
Bobík the pig typically wears a green shirt and yellow trousers. He is fearless and quick-tempered. He is characterized by his strength and appetite. His hobbies are sports, food and working out. His favorite foods are cake from Fifi, sausages, and anything in plentiful supply. He can also drive a car and sing.

=== Fifinka ===
Fifinka is a white dog that wears a pink-purple dress with lace and red shoes. She is courageous and sacrificing. She is characterized by her caring and friendly personality. She loves cooking. Her hobbies are taking care of the house, gardening and adventurous. Since she was a child she enjoyed bows and boyish mischief.

=== Pind'a ===
Pind'a is a hare. He wears red trousers with just one suspender. He is very friendly and warmhearted. He is characterized by being quiet and shy, he also gets scared very easily. He enjoys all kinds of sports and reading detective books. He likes eating everything that Fifi cooks for them. He is also a winner of multiple athletic races.

=== Myska ===
Myska is a mouse. He is Myspulin's assistant. He rarely joins the group on their adventures, but likes to help Myspulin.

== Franchise ==
A short film series is released in 1990 by Bratri v Triku and Kratky Film Prague directed by Ivan Renc. It was still shown on Déčko. It received a revival by 2024 this time on Alkay Animation Prague and directed by Michal Zabka.

A video game entitled Čtyřlístek a strašidelný hrad was released in 2002.

An animated film, Čtyřlístek ve službách krále, was released in 2013 followed by a sequel in 2019.
