= Czech comics =

- Earliest publications: 1920s
- Publishers: BBart; Netopejr; Crew
- Publications: Mladý Hlasatel; Čtyřlístek; Muriel a andělé
- Creators: Jaroslav Foglar; Kája Saudek; Štěpán Kopřiva; Jaroslav Weigel
- Series: "Rychlé šípy" "Lips Tullian"
- Languages: Czech; Slovak

Related articles

Czech comics are comics written in the Czech or Slovak language or by Czech-speaking creators, for the comic markets in the Czech Republic and Slovakia (the former Czechoslovakia).

== History ==
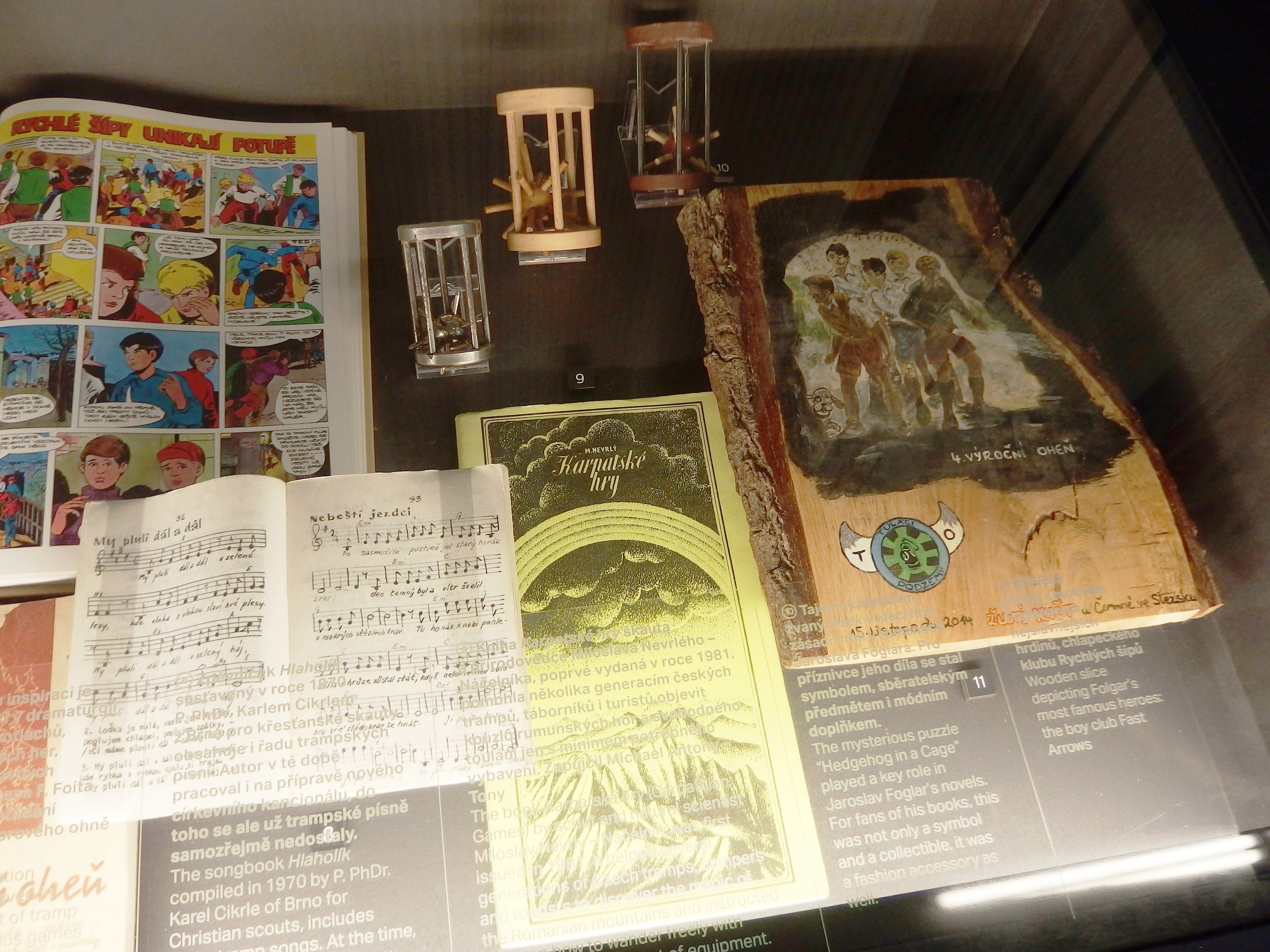
Rychlé šípy comics (top left)

One of the first Czech comic artist was the cartoonist Ladislav Vlodek, for example his comic book series Adolf (where perhaps a Czech speech bubbles were used for the first time) were imprinted in the children's magazine Koule in 1926-1927.

The beginnings of the comics genre in Czechoslovakia are connected with the popular artist Josef Lada, for example in his drawings Šprýmovné komiksy: Obrázkové seriály z let 1922-1946 (Joke Comics: Picture Series from 1922-1946). Ondřej Sekora, the creator of short newspaper strips, has also followed a similar path, whose greatest success was probably Ferda Mravenec from 1933. However, in children's magazines were also published his strips about chicken Napipi, captain Ani Muk and dog Rek.

Magazine Mladý hlasatel (Young Herald) began publishing in 1938 a popular comic series Rychlé šípy, written by Jaroslav Foglar and drawn by Jan Fischer. The publishing of Rychlé šípy continued up to 1989, with interruptions imposed by the Nazis, and later by the Communist regime of Czechoslovakia.

Comics in Czechoslovakia whilst under communist rule were seen rather as bourgeois. As an alleged part of bourgeois propaganda, the genre was displaced from the public sphere. However, the generation of the 1960s managed to acquire a more tolerant attitude from the communists. Following disputes with the critics of the official communist newspaper Rudé právo, some comic artists were allowed to publish during that time.

Čtyřlístek, one of the most popular comic books for children in Czechoslovakia, has been published continuously since 1969. Another important personality in Czech comics, Kája Saudek, began his career in the 1960s. Saudek was the most persecuted comic artist during the Communist era.

In the 1970s, the comics were published in the Czech ABC magazine. There were many interesting authors, such as František Kobík, who specialized in sci-fi comics, which were very popular among young people. Among the most important comics from the ABC magazine are Vzpoura mozků (Revolt of the Brains), Pod paprsky Zářícího (Under the Rays of the Glowing) or Druhá výprava (The Second Expedition).

After Communist rule ended in 1989, numerous publishing houses began to publish comics across the former communist countries of Central and Eastern Europe, including Thorgal and Funky Koval (which had started already in the early 1980s). Many magazines specializing in comics were published, amongst them Bublinky and Jánošík. However, this quantity flooded the market, leading to small sales for individual titles. This saw the bankruptcy of almost all the magazines. Czech comic scene remains practically under control only by Čtyřlístek and Disney journals by Egmont, like Donald Duck and Teenage Mutant Hero Turtles. A new era was launched in 1997 with the release of the first issue of the new Czech magazine Crew. After several years, the magazine renewed interest in comics not only for children. Other publishers were Mot komiks and Aargh!. Magazine KomiksFEST! Revue was published in 2007-2015.

The first Czech self-published superhero comics Dechberující Zázrak (Breathtaking Miracle) came out monthly between 2015 and 2017. Since spring 2018, comics about Pérák have been published in the Czech ABC magazine, its authors are artist Petr Kopl and screenwriter Petr Macek. Their portrayal of Pérák follows the character's appearance in their comics magazine Dechberoucí Zázrak 09. In May 2019, the collected and extended edition of the series, originally published in ABC magazine, was released as a separate book Pérák: Oko budoucnosti (Pérák: Eye of the future).

== Notable comics ==
In 2009, the Czech comics server Komiksarium organized a poll to determine the most significant Czech comics. Sixty members of the board included comic publishers, creators and collectors. They selected what they believed to be the ten most important works in the history of Czech comics:

1. Muriel a andělé (Muriel and Angels) - Miloš Macourek, Kája Saudek (1967–1969)
2. Rychlé šípy - Jaroslav Foglar, Jan Fischer, Marko Čermák (1938–1989)
3. Lips Tullian - Jaroslav Weigel, Kája Saudek (1972–1985)
4. Voleman Jiří Grus (2007)
5. Arnal a dva dračí zuby - Ondřej Neff, Kája Saudek (1988)
6. Velké putování Vlase a Brady - František Skála (1989)
7. Nitro těžkne glycerínem - Štěpán Kopřiva, Jiří Grus (2006)
8. Příhody malého boha - Vlastislav Toman, František Kobík (1973–1974)
9. Vzpoura Mozků - Václav Šorel, František Kobík (1977–1979)
10. Čtyřlístek - Jaroslav Němeček, Ljuba Štíplová (since 1969)

== Literature ==
- Kruml, Milan (2007). Comics: Stručné dějiny (in Czech). Prague: Comics Centrum. ISBN 80-86839-12-5.
