= Leon Clifton =

Fictional character

Leon Clifton (Czech: Léon Clifton) is a fictional detective, a protagonist of numerous Czech language detective stories of early 20th century. He is a brilliant American detective, master of disguise, capable to solve any mystery.

== Publications and authorship ==
The stories, presented as authentic memoirs of an American detective translated from English, were initially published by Rudolf Storch (publisher) in Czechoslovakia during 1906–1911, 275 stories in total. Later publications (by other editors) were mostly either re-editions, or revised editions. These stories represented a phenomenon of Czech literature and were commonly known as cliftonky ("cliftonians", "Clifton tales"; singular: cliftonka). The authorship of the stories is not well attested. The digital archive of Czech Academy of Sciences states that the only confirmed author of cliftonky was Alfons Bohumil Šťastný. The authorship was established only after Šťastný's death when his widow started pursuing the copyrights. Another probable author was Czech actor and comedy and play writer Jaroslav Pulda.

== Influence ==
Other authors were inspired by cliftonky as well. For example, in 1925 Slovak writer Bedřich Beneš Buchlovan published "Nejposlednější dobrodružství Leona Cliftona" [The Last Adventure of Leon Clifton]. Jiří Voskovec and Jan Werich produced a parody play "Gorila ex machina čili Leon Clifton čili Tajemství Cliftonova kladívka", premiered in 1928. During 1991–1994, Jaroslav Velinský, after writing over 30 stories about a (fictional) detective Ota Fink, tried to resurrect Clifton and published 5 cliftonky, with little success.

Some of the best cliftonky were recorded by Czech Radio.

Czech author Jaroslav Foglar in his childhood used to read cliftonky much and even copy them for sale, earning 20 heller per copy. This initially affected his literary style, and some of the first editions of his books were to be corrected later, to get rid of the literary slag.

== Literary criticism ==
Cliftonky were a popular leisure reading of low literary value (paraliterature, pulp fiction).

A notable feature of cliftonky was an accent on the final punishment of "bad guys".

Ivan Adamovič in his Dictionary of Czech Literary Fantasy and Science Fiction brings an attention to fantastic elements in some cliftonky.
