= Choking Hazard =

2004 film

- Directed by: Marek Dobeš
- Written by: Štěpán Kopřiva; Martin Pomothy
- Produced by: Marek Dobeš; Narek Oganesjan; Vlaďka Poláčková
- Cinematography: Martin Preiss; Radovan Subin
- Edited by: Michal Hýka
- Music by: František Fuka; Daniel Krob
- Distributed by: Bontonfilm; Fangoria International
- Release date: April 2, 2004
- Running time: 81 minutes
- Country: Czech Republic
- Language: Czech

Choking Hazard is a 2004 Czech comedy-horror film by Marek Dobeš.

== Production ==
Chocking Hazard was reported to be in production during February 2004.

== Reception ==
Eddie Cockrell of Variety wrote, "Marek Dobes keeps cheeky fun at the fore, with buckets of raspberry-hued gore fleshing out odd rhythms of double-take comedy." Writing in The Zombie Movie Encyclopedia, Volume 2, academic Peter Dendle said, "Many profound thoughts fly around in the light-hearted camp feature ... The script has a good time poking fun at academic philosophy and trendy religions alike".
