= Přístav volá =

1934 book Jaroslav Foglar

Přístav volá (first published as Modrý život Jiřího Dražana) is first book written by Jaroslav Foglar. It was published in 1934 by Melantrich after it won in a competition in young-adult fiction category.

== Plot ==
Jirka Dražan, the main protagonist, is searching for adventure and for somebody to experience the adventure with. All boys in the neighbourhood are too lazy. The only willing boy would be Tonda Pazdera, but Jirka does not like him. One day, Jirka ventures into Harbour District and joins a gang. He experiences many adventures. Eventually he is approached to participate in a burglary and he leaves the gang with distaste. He turns to Láďa Vilemín who has been harassed by the gang. Láďa explains his "Blue Life, a guide for the modern gentleman" to Jirka. Jirka likes the idea and takes it for his own. Some time later, Laďa's family moves to Denmark and he has to say Jirka goodbye. The farewell is painful, but Jirka cherishes his memory and his "Blue Life". He then forms a friendship with Tonda Pazdera.
