= Rychlé šípy =

Fictional club of five boys created by Jaroslav Foglar

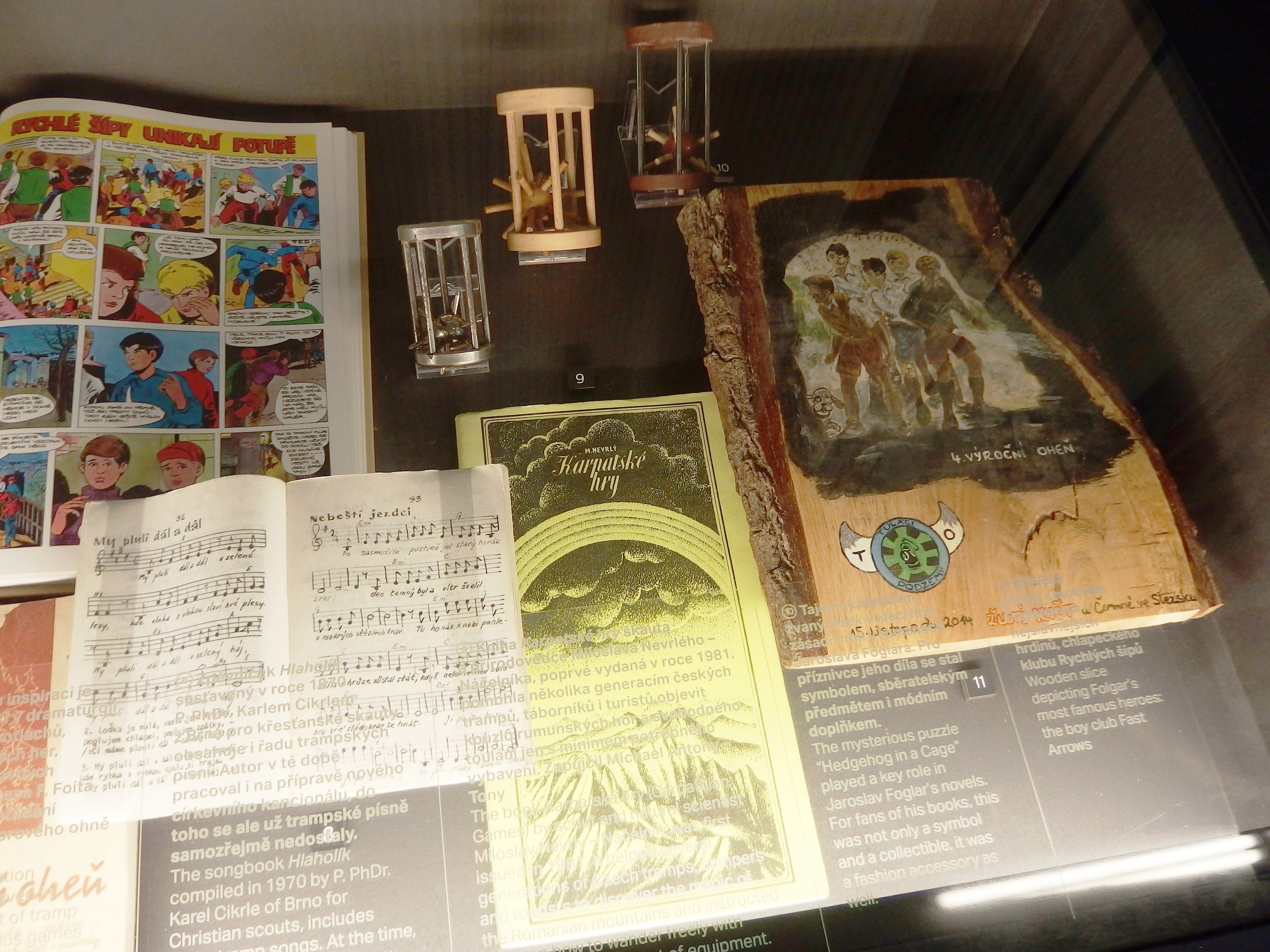
Rychlé šípy comics (top left)

Rychlé šípy ("The Rapid Arrows") is the name of a fictional club of five boys by the Czech writer Jaroslav Foglar. Consisting of Mirek Dušín, Jarka Metelka, Jindra Hojer, Červenáček ("Red Cap"), Rychlonožka ("Speedy") and a dog named Bublina ("Bubble"). Rychlé šípy is a well-known and critically-acclaimed series, though its popularity lies mainly with older generations. The name Mirek Dušín is used by Czechs as a humorous nickname for someone who is notably noble, honest and hard-working. It became the most popular series in the history of Czech comics.

== Literature ==
Rychlé šípy was originally a comic series issued from 1938 to 1989, with stand-stills enforced by the Communist regime of Czechoslovakia. Whilst it was always Jaroslav Foglar who wrote the text, the first series was drawn by Dr. Jan Fischer, the second series (until the end of the 1960s) was drawn by Marko Čermák. The first series was issued in the magazines Mladý Hlasatel ("Young Herald") and Vpřed ("Ahead").

Rychlé šípy are the main characters of the book trilogy called Adventures in the Dark Alleys. The founding of the club is described (with many other stories) in comics, the trilogy describes adventures from later time when the club is already firmly established. Books of the trilogy are Záhada hlavolamu ("Mystery of the Puzzle", 1941), Stínadla se bouří ("Stínadla in Revolt", 1947) and Tajemství Velkého Vonta ("Secret of the High Vont", 1986).

There is a certain time lag between the parts of the trilogy in the story. The period between the stories of the individual books is described through short comic stories, which, however, do not elaborate the plot of the trilogy. They are separate and only loosely connected comic stories, although sometimes they may mention previous book adventures.

The first book was translated into Polish (1959, Tajemniczy cylinder), into Slovak (1970) and into Hungarian (1971, Sündisznó a ketrecben).

== Film ==
Záhada hlavolamu ("Mystery of the Puzzle") was made into black and white TV series in 1969 (directored by Hynek Bočan), which in fact merged stories of first two books into one story. In 1993 the story of the first book was made into a movie (directed by Petr Kotek), but it wasn't followed by rest of the trilogy.

== Locations and props ==
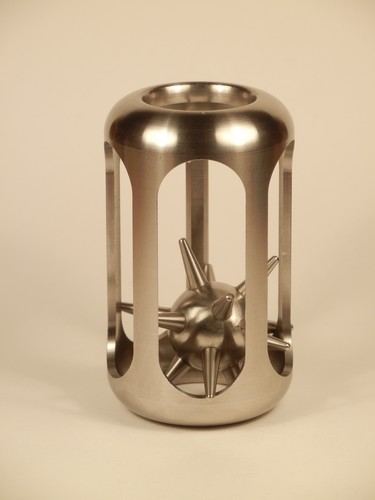
Similar Hedgehog in the Cage as in the movie "Mystery of the Conundrum"

Most of the adventures from trilogy "Adventures in the Dark Alleys" (written by Jaroslav Foglar) happened in an old town quarter, called Stínadla. There lived boys organized in the Vont organization, inimical to boys from other quarters and the whole quarter was introvertive. Well-known props from the movie are the mysterious puzzle Hedgehog in the Cage, Tleskač's flying bike and the dark alleys of Stínadla.

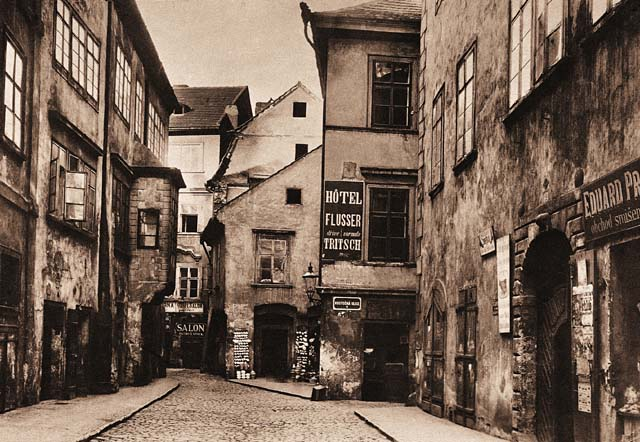
Photo of Josefov before it was demolished in late 1880's, which could be the inspiration for fictional town quarter Stínadla.

The name of the town, where the adventures of Rychlé Šípy happened, is never mentioned (nor in comics nor in books). Names of the known quarters of the town (Dvorce/Yards, Druhá strana/Other Side, Stínadla/Shades and industrial quarter Bekov) does not exist in any Czech town, which means the town itself is fictional. It is widely believed that the town is based on Prague, where Jaroslav Foglar spent most of his life. While quarters Dvorce and Druhá strana seems to be usual town quartes of 1930's, the quarter Stínadla is unique. It is described as very old with narrow and crooked streets with many different nooks and passages. It is said on the pages of the books that some of the narrow streets and passages are not even on the maps of the Stínadla quarter, which makes it difficult for visitors (or intruders) from other parts of the town to find their way around there. Streets there are lit with old style gas lightings, which illuminate only their immediate surroundings, leaving parts of the streets in darkness and shadows. No part of the Prague match this description (nor now nor in 1930's). The quarter seems to be purely fictional, only loosely inspired by eldest parts of Prague, although it could be also inspired by photos of old prague Jewish quarter Josefov, which was demolished in late 1880's (20 years before Jaroslav Foglar was born).

=== Meaning of word Stínadla ===
The word Stínadla, which is translated as "The Shades", is an old Czech word. There is great similarity to the Czech word "stín" (=shadow) but it is only a semblance. The real meaning of word Stínadla is place of execution. This word came from verb "stínat" (=to behead).

As it is described in the trilogy, boys from other parts of town often laughed at boys from Stínadla that they live on a former execution place. That was also the reason for the rise of the Vont organization, which was established by Vojtěch Vont, the first High Vont (the head of the organization). Vonts (and their organization) have their name for his honor. Once organized they were able to arrange "punitive expeditions" to the other quarters to punish the local boys for the mockeries. Thanks to this organization Vonts achieved reputation and respect of youngsters from the other parts of town, who were no more laughing at them, but feared them instead.

The double meaning of the name of the quarter seems as intentional pun for one meaning serves as the reason for the unique community of boys from the quarter (the way they faced the mockeries from other boys) while the other describes the appearance of the quarter. All visits of the quarter by Rychlé Šípy happened at evening, at dusk. The quarter is characterised as a very old one with narrow and crooked alleys, which are lit by old style lamps with dimmer light than lamps of other parts of the town. The quarter was therefore quite dark at that time and full of shadows.

There are several places in the Czech Republic named Stínadla, Na Stínadlech etc.; however, the old town quarter as described in the trilogy is fictional.
