= Crew (comics) =

Czech international comic magazine

Crew, the first regular Czech international comic magazine, started publication in 1997. It was meant to be published every two months, but it started having long breaks after the first year. Officially publication ended in 2003 with Crew 21.

== Name ==
The name of the magazine was a pun on the word blood (Czech: krev) as the magazine wished to portray "bloody" comics alongside others.

== History ==
It ran for quite some time under the team of Štěpan Kopřiva, Jiří Pavlovský and Petr Litoš. But issues 17–21 were done by Vladimír Veverka. After the collapse of the original magazine, Litoš, Kopřiva and Pavlovský began to publish a new magazine — Crew2. Nineteen issues have been published to date (first issue published 2003, latest 2007). The Crew under Veverka was visibly less popular with the long-time fans, although it had its own following.

Crew was the only magazine to officially publish international comics after the 90's comics wave within the Czech republic. It has been criticized for not publishing Czech comics, which was redeemed partly by local magazines, such as Pot.

Explaining the end of the original magazine: Crew 22 was meant to be an issue of the original Crew comics magazine, yet it never was published and Veverka sold the Logo back to the original team. Also, all the comics (except for Understanding Comics's second part) were published in the new magazine.
