= Jaroslav Foglar =

Czech writer (1907–1999)

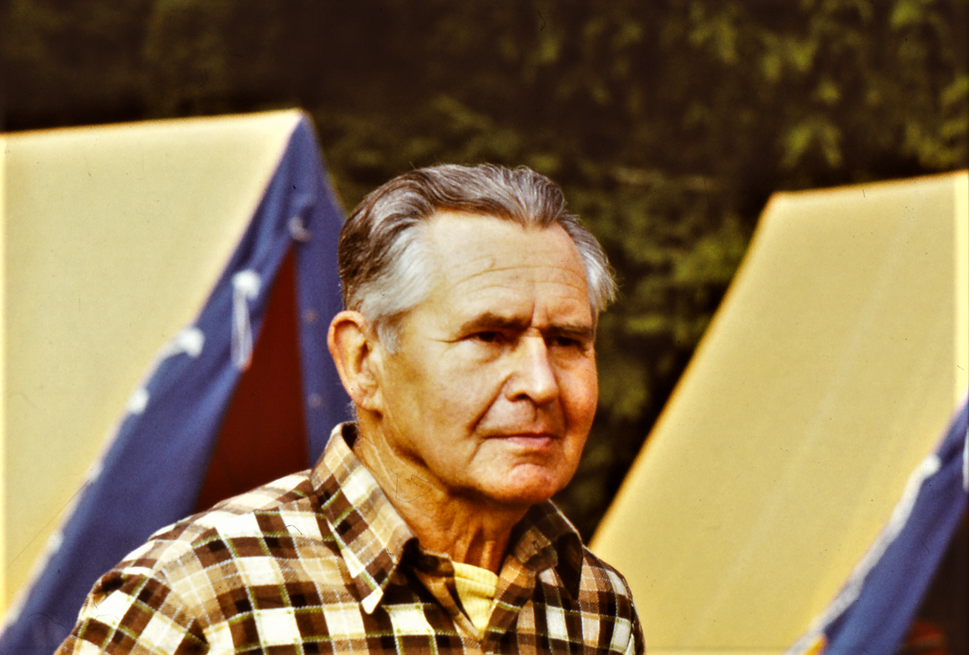
- Jaroslav Foglar in the 1980s
- Born: 6 July 1907; Prague, Bohemia
- Died: 23 January 1999 (aged 91); Prague, Czech Republic
- Occupation: Writer
- Writing career
- Genre: Adventure
- Notable works: Rychlé šípy, Hoši od Bobří řeky, Přístav volá
- Literary movement: Wandervogel, Scouting

Signature
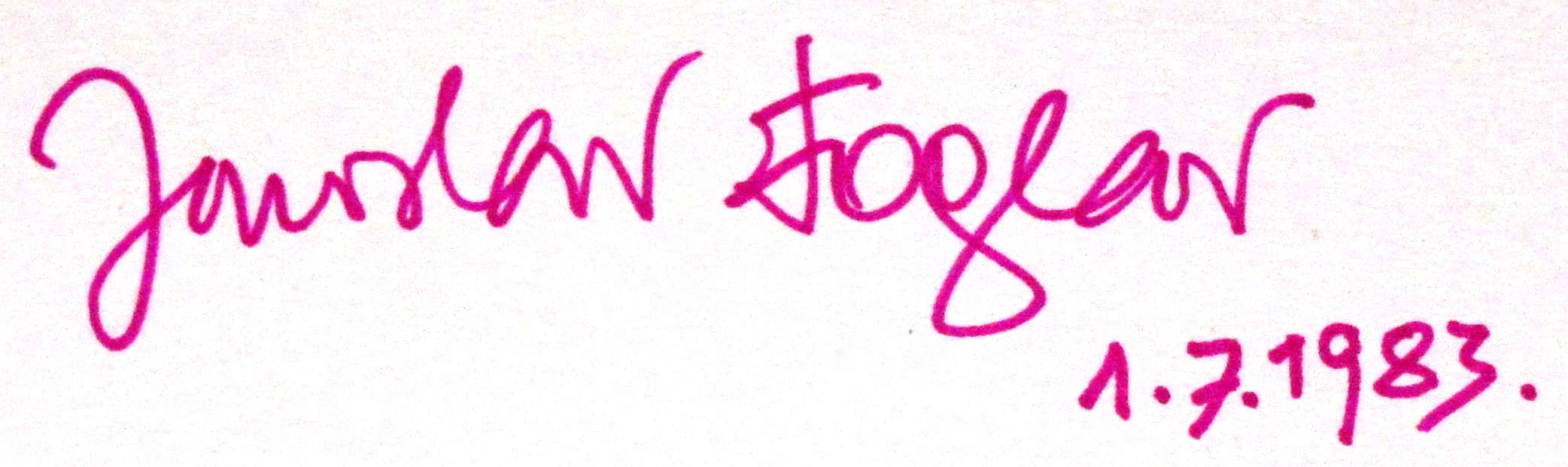

Jaroslav Foglar (6 July 1907 – 23 January 1999) was a Czech writer for children and youth. He wrote many novels about youths (partly also about the Boy Scouts movement) and their adventures in nature and dark city streets. His signature series is Rychlé šípy, which was adapted into comics by Jan Fischer.

== Early life ==
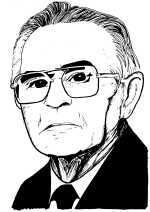
Portrait-drawing of Jaroslav Foglar by Kamil Albrecht

Foglar was born in 1907 and grew up in Prague. Because his father died prematurely, he was brought up in rather poor material conditions by his mother. To earn some extra money, young Foglar used to copy the popular detective stories, cliftonky, earning 20 heller per copy. (This initially affected his literary style, and some of the first editions of his books were corrected later, to get rid of the literary slag.)

He was strongly influenced by the romantic parts of Prague. All of the fictional towns in his novels are more or less derived from it. During the 1920s, Foglar was strongly influenced by the German independent Wandervogel movement as well as the Scout movement led by Antonín Benjamin Svojsík under the Czech name Junák.

== Writer and editor career, prohibited writer and the end of life ==
During the 1930s and 1940s, Foglar worked as a magazine editor in one of the largest Prague publishing houses, Melantrich. He edited several journals for youths:

- Mladý hlasatel ("Young herald"), 1938–1941
- Junák ("Scout"), 1945–1949
- Vpřed ("Ahead"), 1946–1948

and he wrote articles for other journals including the Skaut, Sluníčko, ABC, and the Tramp.

After the Communist coup in 1948 Foglar was kicked out of the publishing house, his magazines were liquidated and his books prohibited, as was the Scout movement and independent youth clubs. For many years he worked as a tutor in boarding schools and youth homes. During the fall of censorship at the end of the 1960s, he published some new books and re-editions of the older ones. After the Soviet occupation of Czechoslovakia his books were once again banned until 1989.

Foglar lived with his mother, caring for her until her death at an old age, and never married.

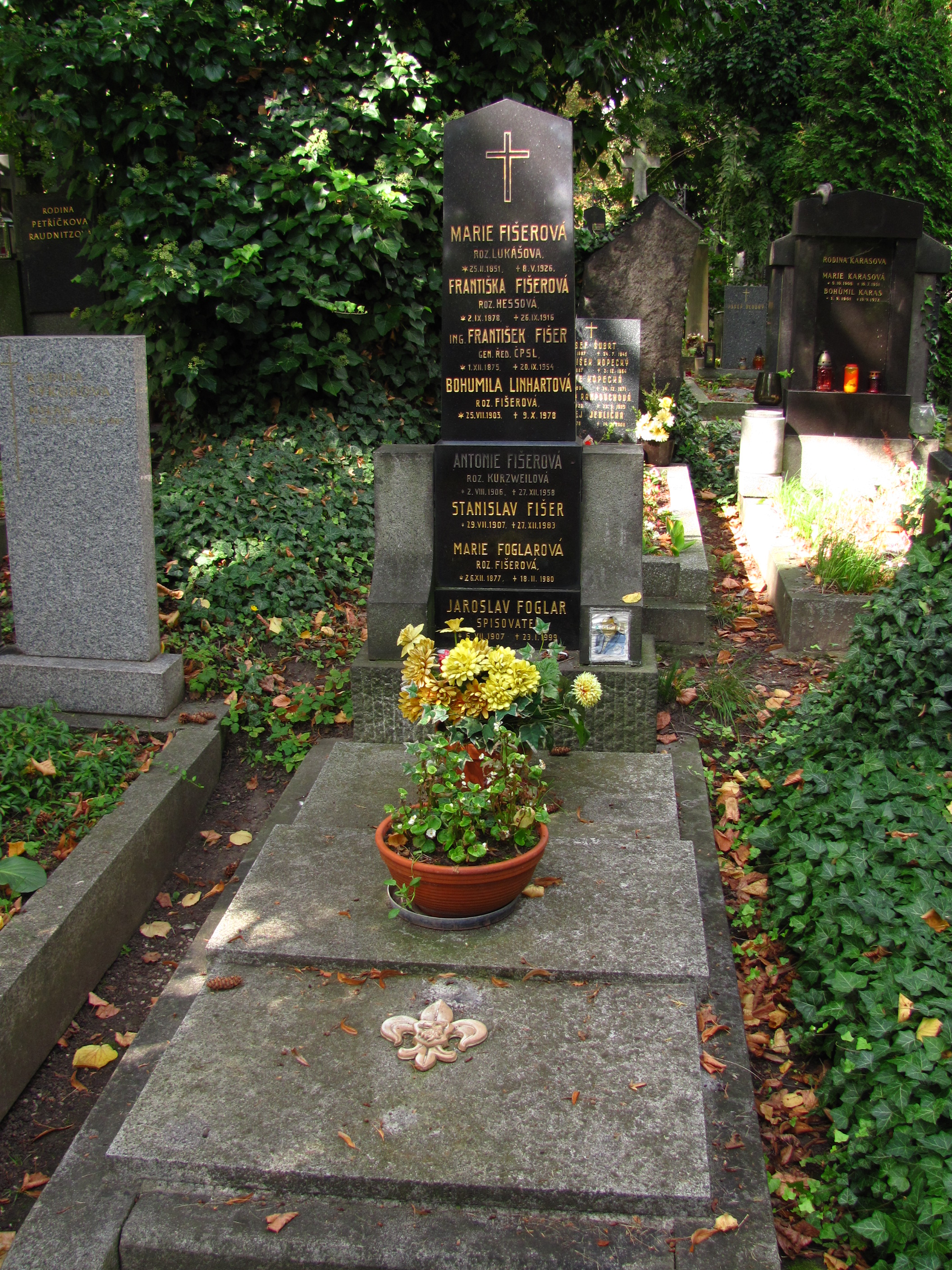
Tomb of Jaroslav Foglar and family at Vinohrady Cemetery in Prague

== Scout versus Youth Club movement ==
Although Foglar worked as a Boy Scout leader, his relation to the Scout movement was not straightforward. He portrayed the Boy Scouts only in a few of his novels (especially Pod junáckou vlajkou and Devadesátka pokračuje), preferring to write mostly about his own invention, the boy clubs.

Foglar's idea of independent boy clubs is basically derived from the German Wandervogel movement. As editor of Mladý Hlasatel, Foglar systematically built clubbist ideology (based on friendship, good deeds, personal sacrifice, love of the nature, etc.) on some and traditions and own terminology. Clubs were small groups between 4 and 8 youths. Some of them were informally led by young men few years older than the other youths, like Rikitan in the novel Hoši od Bobří řeky or by the best of the youths - like the 'exemplary youth' Mirek Dušín of the Rychlé šípy Club.

With Foglar's novels and magazine articles as examples, many Czech youths established such clubs. In the golden age of club movement, there were thousands of such independent clubs, which presented a type of Wandervogel-like alternative to the organized Scout movement. On the other hand, when Scouts were persecuted and forbidden during the German occupation between 1938 and 1945 and during Communism between 1948 and 1989 (with the short exception of renewal of Scout during 1968 and 1969), boy clubs posed an excellent informal alternative of youth life based on ideas similar to those of the Scouts.

== Ideal friendship and Ideal of male education ==
One of the key themes of Foglar's novels is the tension between the loneliness and close friendship between young male heroes. These are especially distinctive in the novels 'Přístav volá', 'Když duben přichází', 'Chata v Jezerní kotlině', 'Modrá rokle' and 'Tajemná Řásnovka'. These novels are also non-scout ones, picturing independent life of youths. On the other hand, in a second large group of his novels, a 'group hero' novels, the plot is based on stories of some organized group of youths, with less individual psychology and more action and adventures. The heroes are boy scouts or independent clubbists.

== Homoerotic elements in his novels ==
Some critics argued that Foglar's novels are crammed with covert homoerotic desire, or that the author himself was gay. Foglar was strongly influenced by German Wandervogel romanticism more than the ideas of British scout movement (which emerged in Czech Lands during World War I). Wandervogel movement itself had some elements of male eroticism. Most of Foglar's novels include close friendships between two youths, with some exceptions in relation to the 'group-hero' novels like 'Rychlé šípy' Club and 'Devadesátka'.

Foglar's novels are set in a prevalently male world, where women are often irrelevant (old grannies or small girls, often without names). This homosociality was very common in literature of the period, regardless of the sexual orientation of the author. Besides, there are also a few strong female characters in his books, and especially in his comic series "Rychlé šípy". Foglar did have a few serious (though eventually unsuccessful) love affairs with women.

== Selected books ==
- Rychlé šípy
- Hoši od Bobří řeky ("Boys from the Beavers' river")
- Přístav volá ("The port is calling")
- Když duben přichází ("When April is coming")
- Pod junáckou vlajkou ("Under the Scouts' flag")
- Devadesátka pokračuje ("The Ninety goes on")
- Záhada hlavolamu ("Mystery of the conundrum"), the mechanical puzzle Hedgehog in the Cage plays a central role in the book
- Stínadla se bouří ("The Shades are revolting")
- Tajemství velkého Vonta ("Secret of the High Vont")
- Strach nad Bobří řekou ("Fear above the Beavers' river")
- Chata v jezerní kotlině ("The log-house in the lake basin")
- Tábor smůly ("The camp of ill luck")
- Tajemná Řásnovka ("Mysterious Řásnovka")
- Boj o první místo ("A fight over the first place")
- Historie svorné sedmy ("History of the harmonious seven")
- Poklad Černého delfína ("Treasure of the Black dolphin")
- Kronika ztracené stopy ("Chronicle of the lost track")
- Náš oddíl ("Our troop")
- Dobrodružství v zemi nikoho ("An adventure in the no-man's land")
- Modrá rokle ("The Blue gorge")
- Jestřábe, vypravuj ("Tell us the story, Goshawk")
- Život v poklusu ("A life in a trot")

Some of his books were published in Slovakia, Hungary, Poland and Germany. Hoši od Bobří řeky was also published in Esperanto.
